= Robert Seyfarth =

American architect

Robert Edward Seyfarth
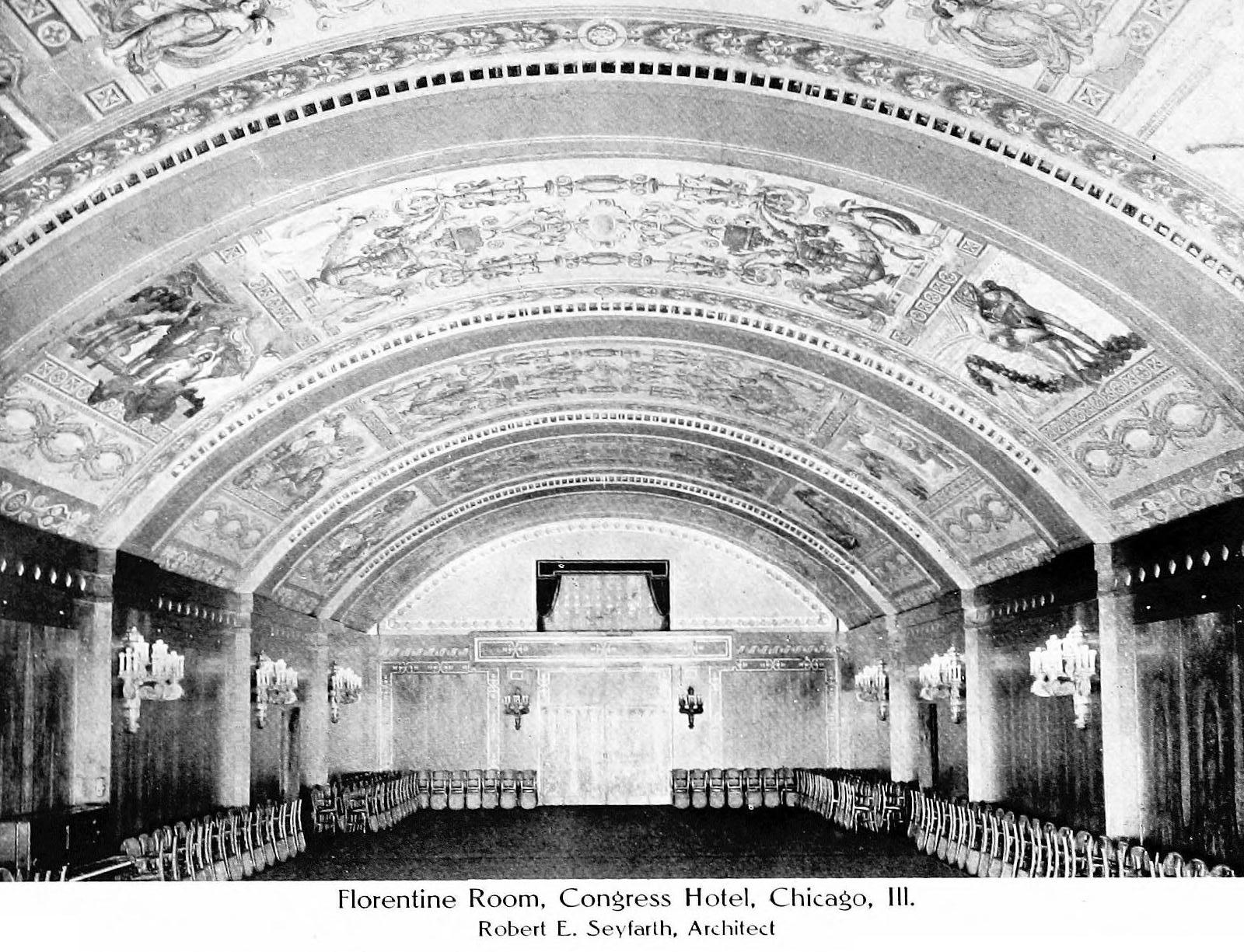
- Born: April 13, 1878; Blue Island, Illinois, U.S.
- Died: March 1, 1950 (aged 71); Highland Park, Illinois, U.S.
- Occupation: Architect
- Buildings: See "Significant works" list below.
- Projects: Plan Portfolio - The Home You Longed For - The Arkansas Soft Pine Bureau, 1918

Robert Seyfarth (/ˈsaɪfərθ/ SY-fərth) was an American architect based in Chicago, Illinois. He spent the formative years of his professional career working for the noted Prairie School architect George Washington Maher. A member of the influential Chicago Architectural Club, Seyfarth was a product of the Chicago School of Architecture.

== Influences of style ==
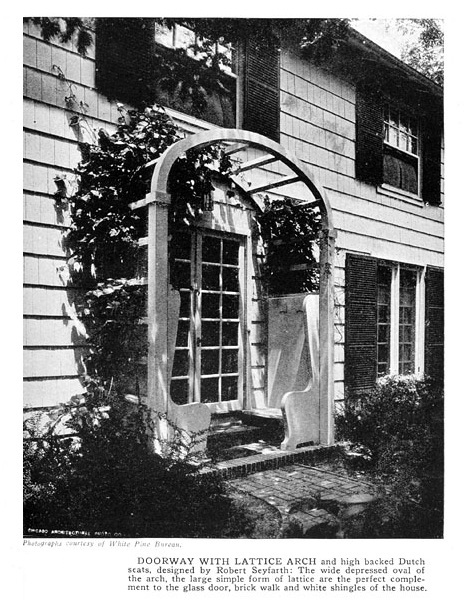
Photograph of a latticework porch by Robert Seyfarth on the front of a house he designed (likely the Bournique house at 421 [later 1509] Oakwood Av., Highland Park, IL [demolished]) which appeared in the June, 1916 edition of The Craftsman magazine. The article that accompanied the image had this to say about the design: The porch "...seems as perfect an architectural use for lattice as could be devised. There is a gracious hospitable informality about it that is most effective ... How delightfully simple are the design and proportion!" This deft handling of proportion and well-considered use of ornamentation is a distinguishing quality of Seyfarth's work and one that was heralded by The Craftsman and others who advanced the cause of modern architecture: "No richness of material or cunning use of handiwork is able to redeem bad proportion; good proportion rises superior to detail and glorifies the humblest material."

Although his early independent projects directly reflected Maher's stylistic influences, as his own style developed Seyfarth's work became distinguished more as a distillation of prevailing revivalist architecture, characterized not by the frequent devotion to detail that typified the movement but by strong geometry, a highly refined sense of proportion, and the selective, discriminating use of historical references. Although any use of these references was condemned by many of the proponents of what was seen as "modern" architecture in the ensuing years, "the neoclassical impulse ... was an effort to purge American architecture of the wilder excesses of historical revivalism [of the nineteenth century] by returning to fundamental architectural principles. The ideals this architecture sought to express were the very ones the most inventive Chicago architects were trying to embody in their own work - order, harmony, and repose ...". As a result, the conception of modern architecture was anything but a static event. "Architects and critics engaged in lively debates concerning the definition of modern architecture and the future direction of building design. This discourse reflected the development of diverse architectural ideologies and forms that ranged from Beaux-Arts classicism to streamlining." Joseph Hudnut, the first dean of Harvard University's School of Design and a noted proponent of modern architecture, recognized the emotional limitations of houses that expressed their design using the typical modern vocabulary of glass, concrete and steel: "They have often interesting aesthetic qualities, they arrest us by their novelty and their drama, but too often they have very little to say to us". The case for the use of historic references in modern architecture was made by no less than William Adams Delano (1874-1960), who was considered to be one among the "new generation of architects [who] shaped and developed American taste, producing a style leavened with erudite abstraction and sparing composition". Delano argued that if a project was "handled with freedom and ... answered the needs of our present day clients, it will be really expressive of our own time". Seyfarth opted to take his career down this divergent path, and in doing so created a legacy of architecture that "speaks of good breeding with an independent spirit."

== Background ==
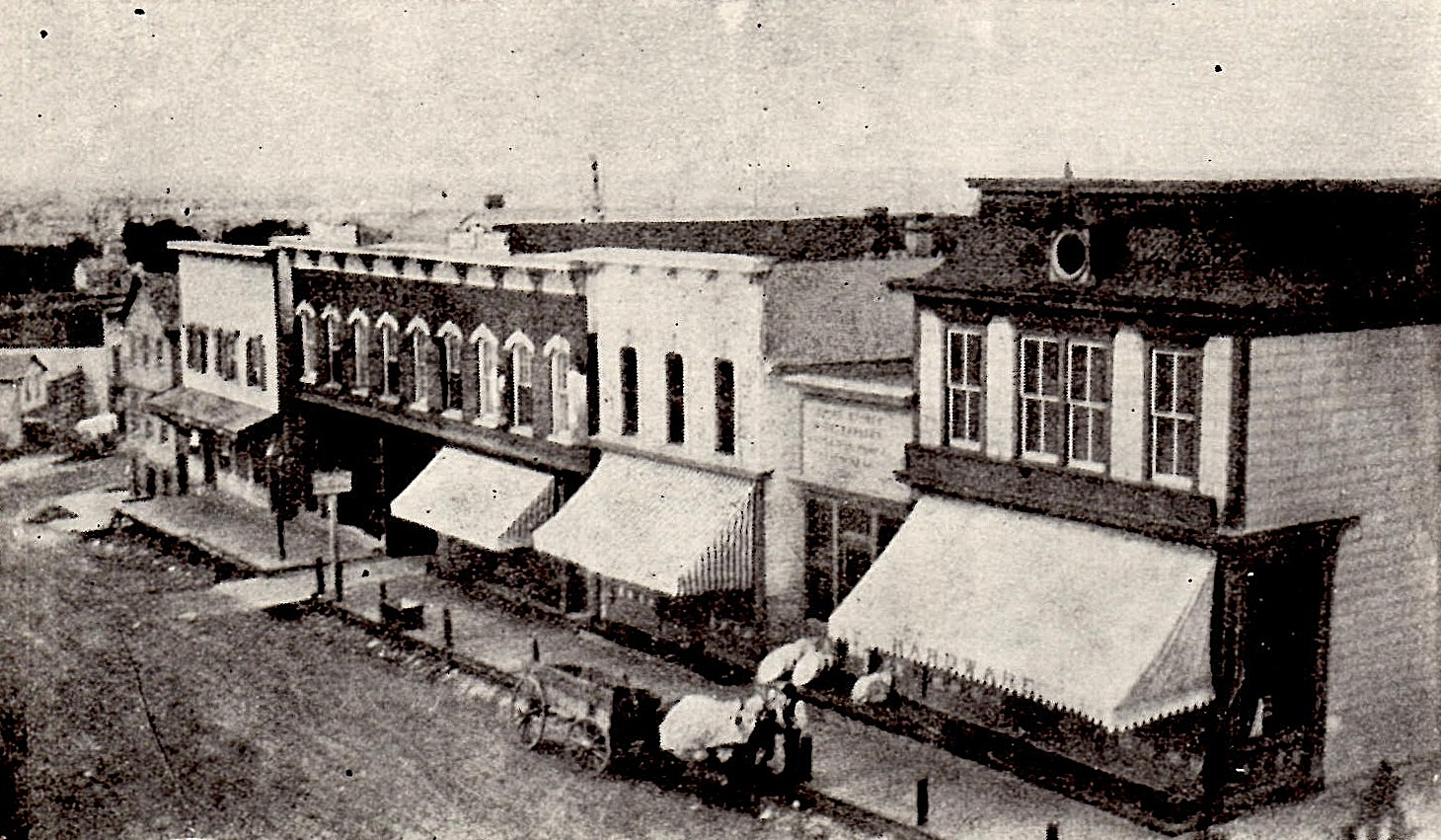
The three buildings on the right were owned by the Seyfarth family and stood on the south-west corner of Grove St. and Western Ave. in Blue Island, Illinois. The white building in the center of the photograph was the tavern that William Seyfarth operated after he came to Blue Island in 1848. It originally stood on the corner, but was remodeled and relocated in 1880 when the building shown here on the corner was erected to house Edward Seyfarth's hardware store. All three buildings were destroyed in the Great Blue Island Fire of 1896, which began in a shed behind the Bairischer Hof, the building to their immediate left. The Bairischer Hof survived the fire.

Robert Seyfarth grew up as a member of a prominent local family. His grandfather William Seyfarth had come to the United States in 1848 from Schloss Tonndorf in what is now the state of Thuringia, Germany, with the intention of opening a tavern (what would now be considered an inn) in Chicago. Advised to locate outside of the city, he settled with his wife Louise in Blue Island, which a couple of years earlier had begun to experience an influx of immigration from what was then known as the German Confederation.

William purchased a building that was standing at the south-west corner of Grove Street and Western Avenue and opened his business. The location was a good one - it was on what was then called the Wabash Road a day's journey from Chicago, which guaranteed the tavern a steady supply of prospective customers for many years. At about the same time he purchased a stone quarry about a mile south-west of the settlement (where Robbins, Illinois now stands) and operated it concurrently with the inn, although apparently without as much success. He was a member of the school board when Blue Island built its first brick schoolhouse in 1856, and served as clerk and later as assessor for the township of Worth from 1854 until he died in 1860. William and Louise had five sons, including Edward, who was the father of the architect.
Edward Seyfarth was active in community affairs on many levels. Not only did he own and operate the local hardware store, but in 1874 he was a charter member of the Blue Island Ancient Free and Accepted Masons and in 1890 was one of the founders of the Calumet State Bank. He served as village treasurer from 1880–1886 and as village trustee from 1886–1889 and again from 1893-1895. Over the years other members of the family were also active in the community - they were involved in banking, the board of education, and the Current Topics Club (later the Blue Island Woman's Club), who was largely responsible for the founding of the Blue Island Public Library. Charles A. Seyfarth was one of the founding members of the Blue Island Elks in 1916. (The architect was himself apparently a person of catholic interests - he was an active member of the Poultry Fancier's Association during the time that Blue Island was the headquarters for the Northeastern Illinois Fancier's Association in the early years of the 20th century).
From the time his grandparents arrived in 1848 to the time Robert Seyfarth left Blue Island in about 1910 for Highland Park, the village had grown from being a pioneering hamlet of about 200 persons to a prosperous industrial suburb with a population of nearly 11,000, which the noted publisher and historian Alfred T. Andreas had called "...a quiet, though one among the prettiest little suburban towns in the West". It was in this atmosphere that Seyfarth grew up, attended primary school, married his first wife Nell Martin (1878–1928), and built their first home.

== Education and career ==
=== Chicago Manual Training School ===
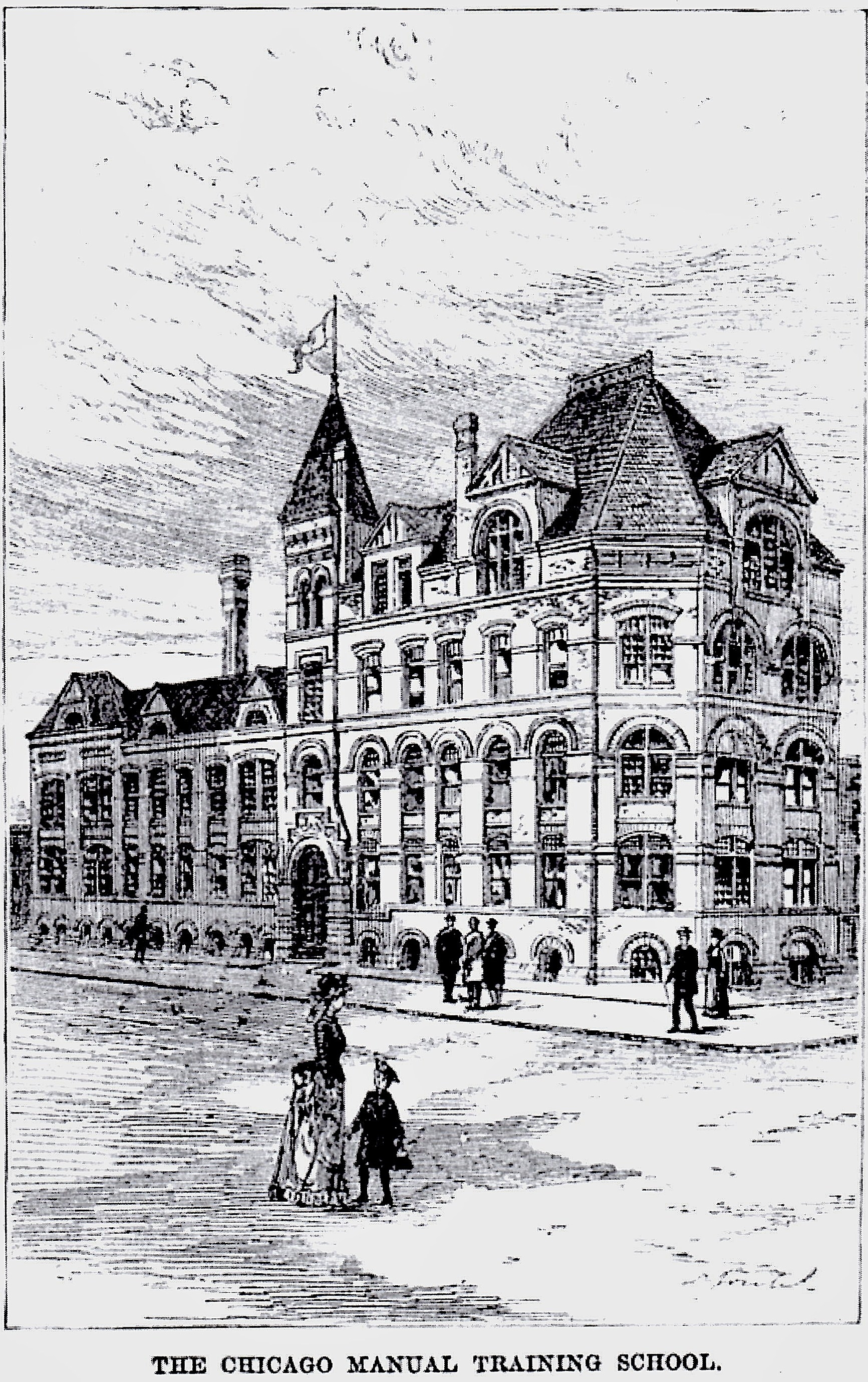
The Chicago Manual Training School building, 349-353 (now 1154) S. Michigan Avenue (Solon Spencer Beman, architect - 1884). After CMTS was acquired by the University of Chicago and moved to its Hyde Park campus in 1903 the building was occupied by Dearborn Medical College and The University of Illinois College of Pharmacy. It is no longer standing.

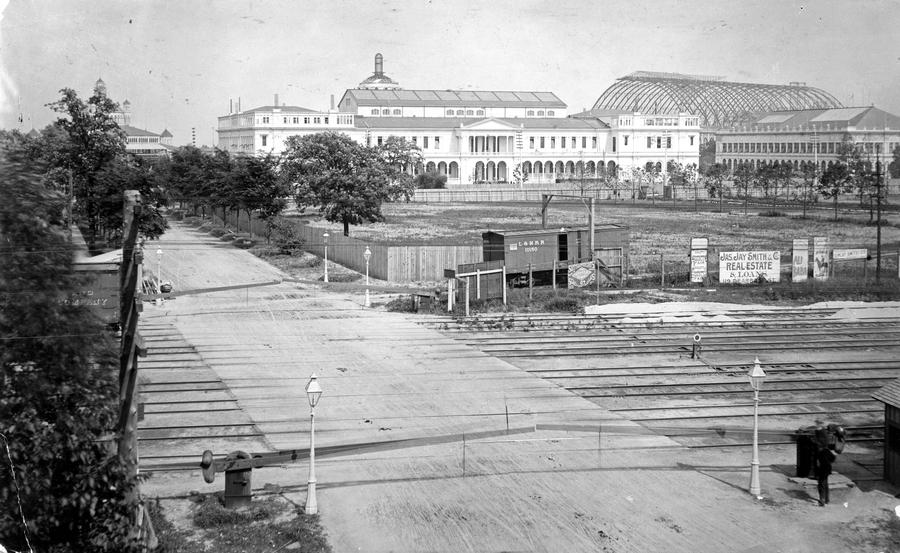
The World's Columbian Exposition under construction as seen looking east from the Illinois Central tracks at 61st St. The tracks would be elevated by the time the Fair opened in 1893.

Seyfarth began his architectural education at the Chicago Manual Training School, which was founded by the Commercial Club (after 1907 The Commercial Club of Chicago) out of a concern for the quality of the education of skilled labor in the Chicago region. The school had opened its doors on January 4, 1884 with four teachers and seventy-four pupils and the support of the sixty members of the club who had "pledged themselves to found a manual training school, and guaranteed for its construction, equipment and support [with] the sum of one hundred thousand dollars". The club, which was founded in 1877, was a group of the city's most influential leaders that included Marshall Field, George Pullman, Edson Keith, Cyrus McCormick and George Armour. The club's successor, The Commercial Club of Chicago would later sponsor Daniel Burnham and Edward H. Bennett's Plan of Chicago (1909), which is widely regarded as one of the most important public planning documents ever created. Chicago Manual Training School was a private secondary school and was designed to graduate its students three years from the time they entered. The student body, which was all male, was required to spend an hour each day in the drafting room and two hours a day in the shop, in addition to the time spent in classrooms studying the conventional high school curriculum. In 1891 the tuition averaged $100.00 per year "to those able to pay it". In 1903 the institution became part of the University of Chicago Laboratory Schools, operating out of CMTS (later Belfield) Hall.
Although it was to take him in a totally different direction, Chicago Manual Training School, with its focus on the industrial arts, was a logical choice for the secondary education of the oldest son of a hardware dealer, especially in an age when primogeniture was considered important. Besides his classes in drawing Seyfarth studied mathematics, English, French, Latin, history, physics, chemistry, foundry and forgework, machine shopwork, woodwork, political economy and civil government. He attended classes and graduated in 1895 with the son of Dankmar Adler, the son and the nephew of Henry Demarest Lloyd and with Henry Horner (1878-1940) who was the governor of Illinois from 1933 until the time of his death.
Despite the fact that it was 17 miles away, Seyfarth enjoyed the advantage of the school's convenient location. The railway depot that marked the beginning of his trip was a two-block walk from his home at Grove Street and Western Avenue, with the end of the ride being at the Illinois Central's Twelfth Street Station, which was located directly across the street from the school. The ride would have taken him directly over the Midway Plaisance of the World's Columbian Exposition, where he would have a clear view to the west of the great Ferris Wheel and to the east of the Beaux Arts majesty of the main body of the Fair. It is difficult to imagine that to a boy from small-town America in the early 1890s this would not have created an impression and provided him with enormous inspiration, as it did the architectural world at large for the next forty years. In her book A Poet's Life - Seventy Years in a Changing World, the writer, founder of the magazine Poetry and social critic Harriet Monroe succinctly noted forty-five years after the closing of the Fair that "... like all great achievements of beauty, it has become an incalculably inspiring force which lasted into the next 'age'."

=== The Chicago Architectural Club ===
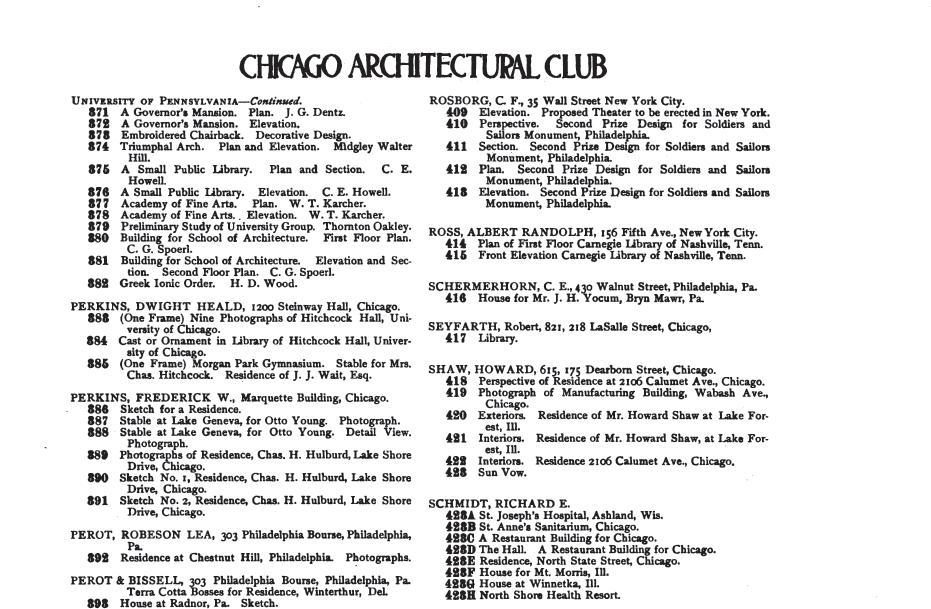
Page 12 from the catalog of the Sixteenth Annual Exhibition of the Chicago Architectural Club (1903), showing Seyfarth's entry for a "Library". Seyfarth would later become a member of The Illinois Society of Architects, who by 1918 and thru 1928 would sponsor the exhibition in conjunction with The Chicago Architectural Club and The Illinois Chapter of the American Institute of Architects, with the cooperation of the Art Institute of Chicago.

The education of an architect in the early years of the 20th century was quite different from what it is today, and the ambitious prospective architect could take many avenues to acquire it. In April 1905, for example, Seyfarth attended his first meeting as a member of the Chicago Architectural Club, which had been founded in 1885 as the Chicago Architectural Sketch Club by James H. Carpenter, a prominent Chicago draftsman, with the support of the magazine Inland Architect, whose first issue had been published in February 1883. The club was formed in Chicago during a period when architecture there was in its ascendancy - after the Great Fire of 1871 a large population of some of the country's best architectural talent had come to rebuild a modern city using the most advanced and progressive techniques of the day. Even so, the community was taxed trying to perform all of the work that was necessary to keep up with the task. Chicago was developing at a rate that astounded anyone who was paying attention to its growth, such that "one unfamiliar with the city would find ... fresh subject for astonishment, daily, in [its] ever-changing and ever-extending boundary lines." As the Chicago architect John Wellborn Root recalled years later:

"The conditions attending the development of architecture in the West have been, in almost every respect, without precedent. At no time in the history of the world has a community covering such vast and yet homogeneous territory developed with such amazing rapidity, and under conditions of civilization so far advanced. Few times in history have ever presented so impressive a sight as this resistless wave of progress, its farthermost verge crushing down primeval obstacles in nature and desperate resistance from the inhabitants; its deeper and calmer waters teeming with life and full of promise more significant than has ever yet been known."

The club was an effort to help develop the talents of the city's many draftsmen so that they could become qualified architects themselves, at a time when a formal education for architects was generally unavailable and not required. (The first architectural school in the United States was founded by architect William Robert Ware at MIT in 1868 with nine students, and even by 1896, the year after Seyfarth's graduation, there were only nine schools in the country with a combined student body of 273.) Seyfarth joined during the time he worked for Maher, who over the years was an active member of the club as a speaker, writer, exhibitor and judge in its annual competitions. Seyfarth is known to have entered his work at two of these exhibitions - the first time in 1903 (before he became a member), when his submission was listed as a "Library", and again in 1905, where the subject of the entry was his own house in Blue Island. The preface to the catalogue of the 1905 exhibition was devoted to what the noted architect Elmer Grey (1872–1963) called "Inventive and Indigeonous Architecture", a phrase which perfectly reflected Seyfarth's design for this particular house and may have been one of the reasons why images of it were included.

Because of his association with the Chicago Architectural Club, Seyfarth would have ample opportunity to become acquainted with the major players of Chicago's progressive architectural community, a large number of whom were active members. These were relationships that Maher would doubtless have encouraged. Notables among the list included Charles B. Atwood, Daniel Burnham, Dankmar Adler, Louis Sullivan, Howard Van Doren Shaw, William Le Baron Jenney and Frank Lloyd Wright.
The club's headquarters for many years was located in the former mansion of the piano manufacturer William W. Kimball at 1801 Prairie Ave. in Chicago. It ceased to operate as an active organization in 1940 and was dissolved in 1967, but exists again today after it was re-formed in 1979.

=== Influences and early career ===
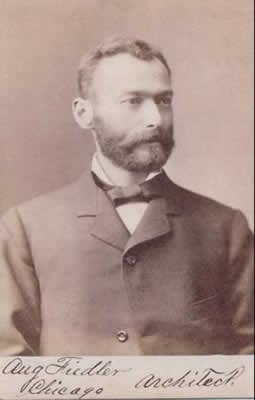
August Fiedler (1843-1903)

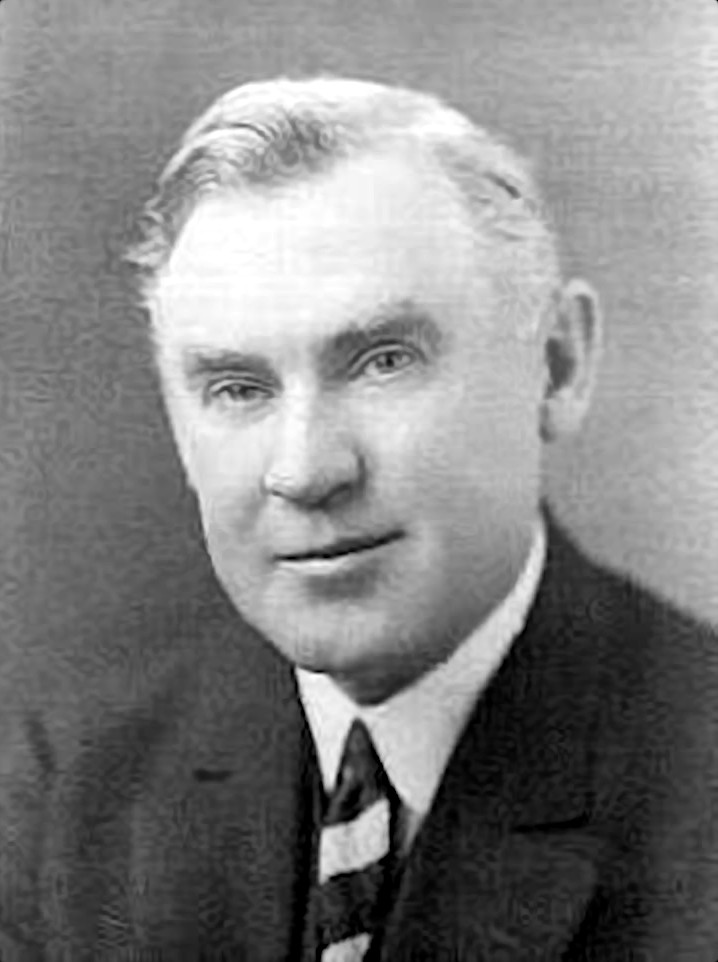
George Washington Maher (1864-1926)

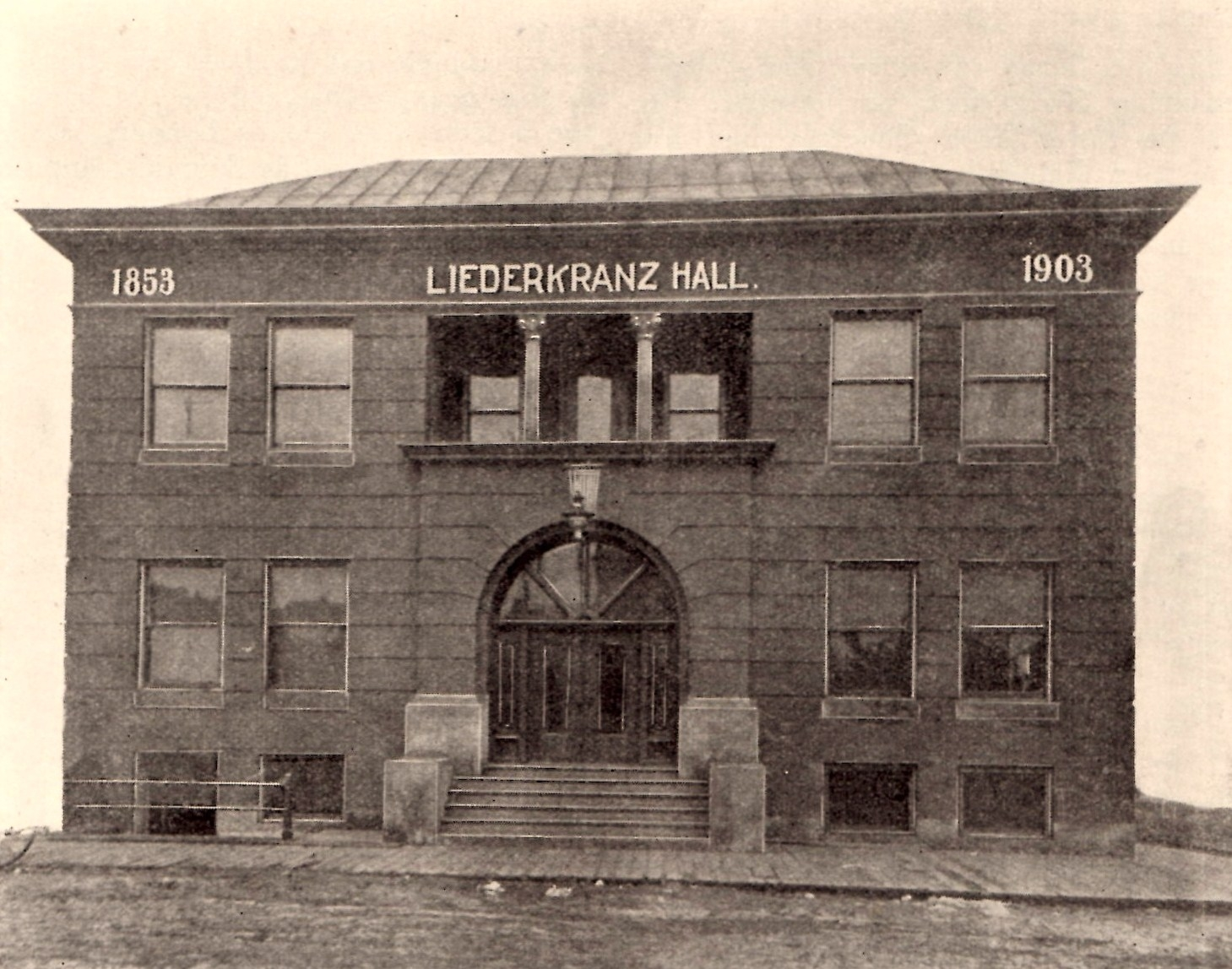
The Liederkranz Hall in Blue Island was designed by George Washington Maher, and erected in 1897 at a cost of $8,500 to replace the club's building that had been destroyed by the Great Blue Island Fire of the previous year. It was dedicated on November 21, 1897 and was itself destroyed by fire on January 9, 1918.

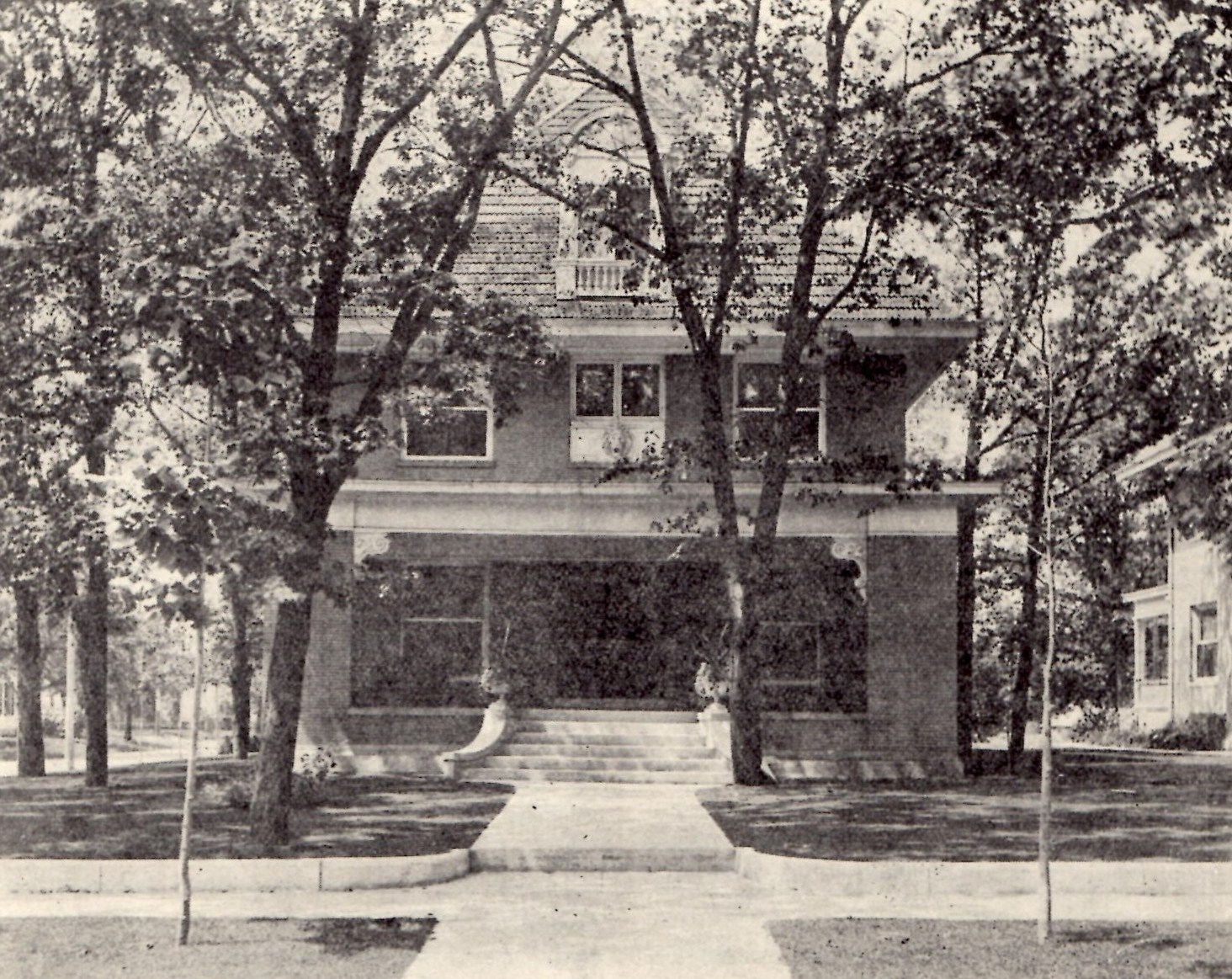
The William Weber house, 12956 Greenwood Avenue, Blue Island, Illinois. George Washington Maher, architect (1898). Weber was president of the First National Bank of Blue Island (later Great Lakes Bank, now merged with First Midwest Bank) and of the local board of education. He also served as a member of the Cook County Board of Assessors from 1898 to 1925, and six times as a delegate to the Republican National Convention. Weber had a connection to Maher's work on several levels - aside from his own home he was a member of the Blue Island Liederkranz, and through his activities with the Republican County Central Committee he had a close working relationship with Edgar J. Magerstadt, who in 1908 would use Maher to design the landmark home he built at 4930 S. Greenwood Ave. in the Kenwood neighborhood of Chicago. Weber was doubtless well-acquainted with the Seyfarth family.

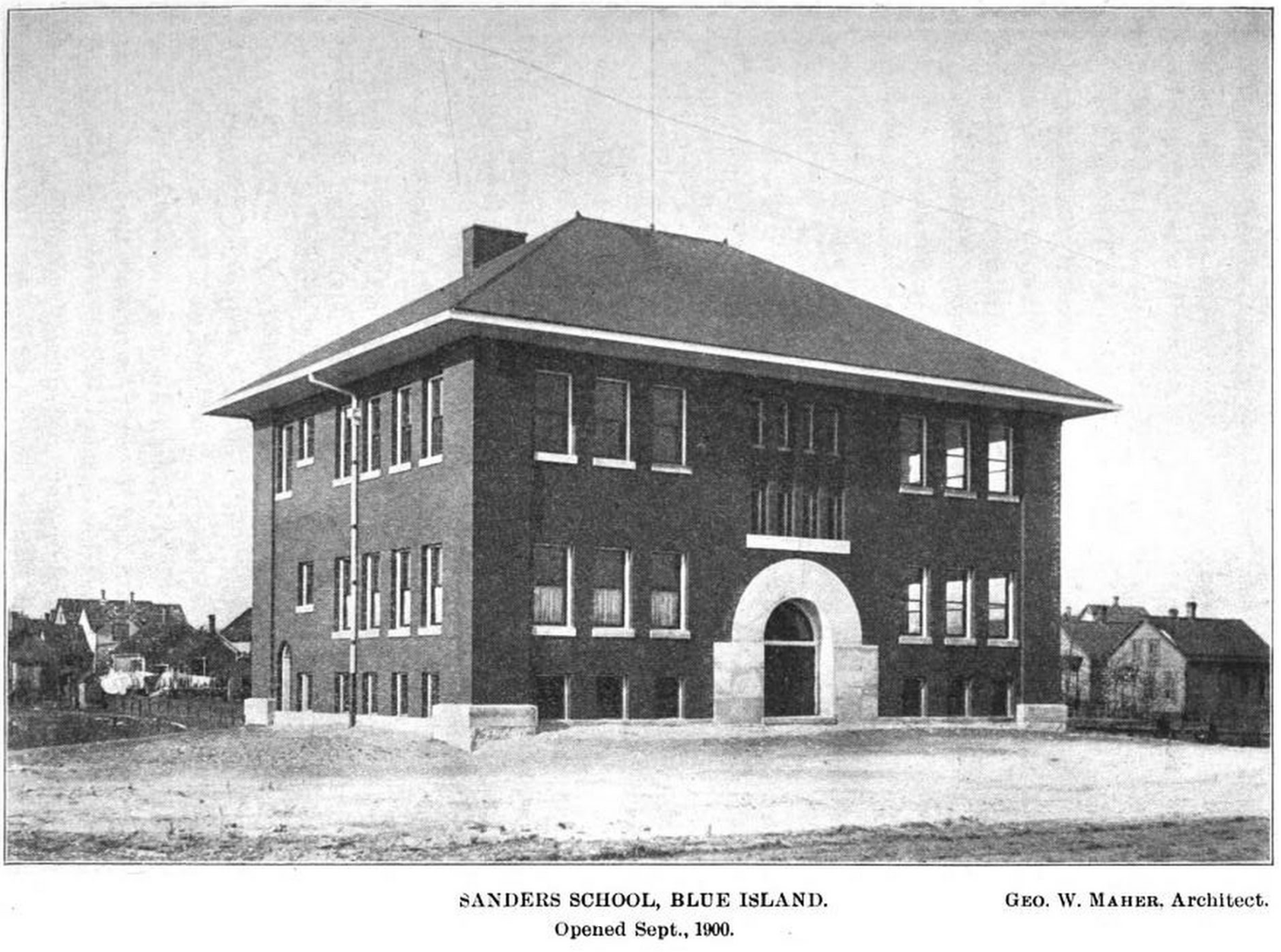
Sanders School, Blue Island, IL. William Weber was president of the School Board when Maher designed this building in 1900 during the time Seyfarth was in Maher's employ.

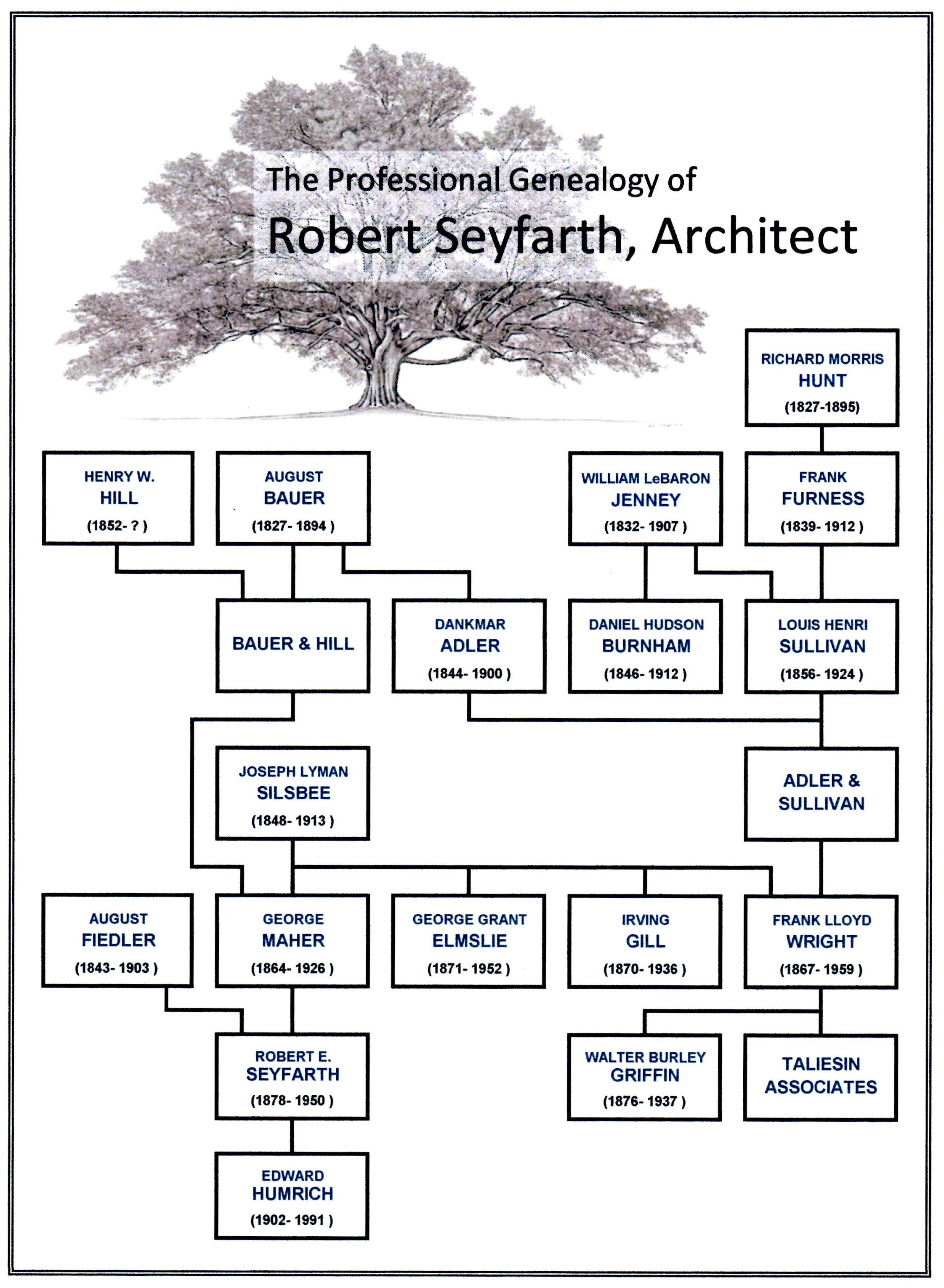
This chart depicts the professional relationships through employment and mentorship over several generations that helped to shape the architectural philosophy of Robert Seyfarth. Anyone with even a passing interest in the architectural history of the United States will immediately recognize many of the individuals whose names are included here - names that constitute a list of many of America's most distinguished architects and innovative thinkers of the 19th and early 20th Centuries.

Robert Seyfarth graduated from the Chicago Manual Training School in 1895, and literature published by the school shows his position upon graduation to be that of a "Draughtsman" for the Chicago architect August Fiedler. Fiedler was born in Germany and came to the United States in 1869, establishing himself first in New York City and then in Chicago as a much sought-after designer of high-end residential interiors, later becoming an architect. He designed some of the woodwork and other decoration for the Samuel Nickerson House (1879–1883) on Erie Street in Chicago (now the Driehaus Museum), and the interiors of the Hegeler Carus Mansion (William W. Boyington,1874–1876) in LaSalle, Illinois. In an 1881 letter to a colleague, one of Fiedler's contemporaries commented on the quality of Fiedler's design work for Nickerson by saying that "...it would be hard to comprehend its beauty without seeing it". From 1893 to 1896 he was the chief architect for the Board of Education for the city of Chicago (being the first to assume the position upon the creation of the building department on January 18, 1893), for whom he designed and/or supervised the construction of fifty-eight school buildings, and he was responsible for the design of thirty-eight buildings (thirty-six in the German Village alone) at the World's Columbian Exposition . Seyfarth began his career as an architect at the age of 17 working for Fiedler during the time the latter was architect to the board of education, and records show his position at the time he was hired to be "messenger" (although, as noted above, his graduation notice suggested something more than that), for which he was compensated with a salary of $6.00 per week (about $219.76 in 2023). Fiedler operated out of offices in Adler and Sullivan's Schiller (later Garrick Theater) Building (1891, demolished 1961), and Seyfarth was almost certainly introduced to him through his uncle Henry Biroth, who was one of the earliest pharmacists in Chicago and served at various times as the secretary and president of the Illinois Pharmaceutical Association, which occupied offices down the hall from Fiedler. The Seyfarth family had been acquainted with Fiedler for several years before Seyfarth began to attend Chicago Manual Training School. Henry Biroth was an active member of Chicago's large ethnic German community, and in 1887, Fiedler (with his partner John Addison) had designed a house for him in Blue Island. How long the young Seyfarth worked for Fiedler and the board of education is not known (Fiedler separated from the board of education late in 1896, and was replaced by Normand Patton), but by 1900 he was working for George Washington Maher on the renovation of the interior of the Nickerson mansion for Lucius Fisher. Here, according to the Historic American Buildings Survey, he designed and carved the woodwork for the rare book room.
Maher was an influential architect associated with the Prairie School movement. According to H. Allen Brooks, professor emeritus of fine arts at the University of Toronto "His influence on the Midwest was profound and prolonged and, in its time, was certainly as great as was [Frank Lloyd] Wright's. Compared with the conventional architecture of the day, his work showed considerable freedom and originality, and his interiors were notable for their open and flowing ... space". Henry M. Hyde, in a 1913 article in the Chicago Tribune, recognized the work of Maher and of the other members of "the new American School of Architecture" by noting "They pay no attention to the conventions and rules of the classic types of architecture. They would express a new and democratic spirit." He went on to say "...there is no doubt that just now the Chicago insurgents and their work is attracting more attention and causing more comment than any other architectural development in America".

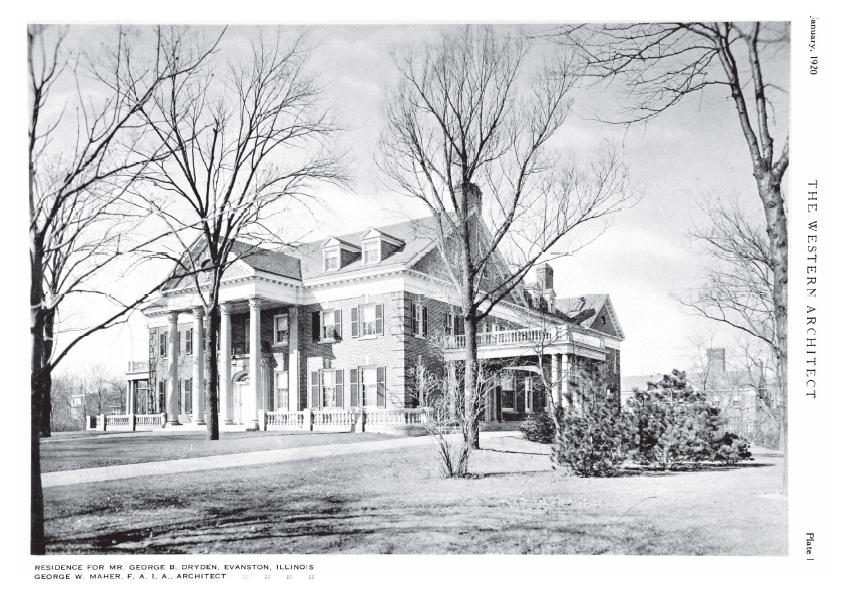
The residence of George B. Dryden (1869-1959), 1314 Ridge Ave, Evanston, Illinois. George Maher, architect (1918). Maher was not above providing a design for a building in a traditional style when the occasion called for it, and this example shows that his office was capable of executing well-designed work. In featuring this house in its January, 1920 issue The Western Architect magazine acknowledged that although the house was stylistically outside the realm of what Maher would normally be expected to provide, it noted that "He certainly maintains his faith in the "progressive" movement and will continue to work along such lines, believing, however, that no architect is capable of doing creative work who is not thoroughly well-grounded in the architecture of the past". This statement, if it accurately portrays Maher's philosophy, must have had a decided effect on Seyfarth's architectural development. The house still stands. Along with its coachhouse, it is divided into six condominium units.

The beginning of Maher's life, however, wasn't quite so auspicious. He was born in Mill Creek, West Virginia, and at about the age of five, due to the adverse economic conditions in Mill Creek at the time, his family moved to New Albany, Indiana. There Maher attended primary school, but by the time he was in his early teens the family was on the move again, this time to Chicago. They went there to take advantage of the prosperity that had come to the city after the Great Fire of 1871, and in 1878 George was sent to apprentice with the Chicago architect Augustus Bauer (after 1881 in partnership with Henry Hill who, with Arthur Woltersdorf would build St. Benedict Church in Blue Island in 1895) by his parents who, as was not unusual at the time, needed to augment the family income with the earnings that this type of employment would provide. As history would show, this turn of events proved to be fortunate for Maher. Bauer was considered to be one among "the city's prominent social and cultural arbiters." He had come to the United States in 1853 having been a part of the wave of German immigration that had brought Robert Seyfarth's grandfather to the United States, and he and his various partners, who were also of German extraction, played an important role in providing architectural services for the large German community in Chicago during the second half of the 19th century. In 1869 Bauer designed the first German school in Chicago at 1352 S. Union Street for Zion Lutheran Church, and in 1872-73 Bauer and Löebnitz designed Concert Hall, Chicago Turngemeinde (demolished) at Clark Street and Chicago Avenue. The output of the Bauer partnerships included many distinguished projects, including Old St. Patrick's Church at 700 W. Adams Street (1856, renovated and restored 1992-1999, which Chicago magazine ranked among the 40 most important buildings in Chicago), the Rosenberg Fountain in Grant Park (dedicated October 16, 1893, restored 2004), and Tree Studios at 601-623 N. State Street (1894–1913, with Parfitt Brothers, renovated 2004). Bauer is credited with the invention of the isolated footing foundation system, which allows for a longer span between vertical supports. This innovation among other things permits the broad expanses of glass that have become a standard feature of modern architecture. Maher was not Bauer's only notable protégé - at the beginning of the Civil War and again at the end of it, Bauer employed Dankmar Adler (1844–1900), who would later work with Louis Sullivan on buildings that would come to be regarded as important contributions to the Chicago School of architecture, notably the Chicago Stock Exchange Building (1893, demolished 1972) and the Auditorium Building (1889) (now the home of Roosevelt University).
How long Maher worked for Bauer and his partners is not known, but by the 1880s he was working in the office of Joseph Lyman Silsbee, who before he became an architect had been professor of architecture at the new College of Fine Arts at Syracuse University. Silsbee was a talented architect who designed in the latest architectural fashion. He was noted for his Shingle style buildings and "... was a master of the Queen Anne style, and in gaining the romantic effect admired by his clients he depended less upon [its inherent] chaos than his contemporaries". He came to Chicago in 1882 to act as an interior architect and as such was responsible for the opulent interiors of Potter and Bertha Palmer's fantastic castle at 1350 N. Lake Shore Drive (built 1881-1885, demolished 1950, Henry Ives Cobb (1859–1931) and Charles Sumner Frost (1856–1931) architects), and stayed to design several important projects for the city, including the Lincoln Park Conservatory (1890–1895) and the West Virginia Building and the Moving Sidewalk for the World's Columbian Exposition (1893). While he worked for Silsbee, Maher worked alongside George Grant Elmslie (1869–1952), Frank Lloyd Wright (1867–1959) and Irving Gill (1870–1936), who would each later become prominent architects, although with decidedly different architectural styles. In 1888 Maher established his own office with Charles Corwin, a relationship that lasted until about 1893. He briefly enjoyed a professional relationship with Northwestern University in Evanstion, Illinois, where in 1909 (during Seyfarth's tenure in his office) he designed Swift Hall and the first Patten Gymnasium (demolished 1940). These buildings were bold expressions of his unique design philosophy and were to have been integral parts of his master plan for the campus, which the board of trustees had commissioned through a competition in 1911 but failed to execute. This prompted one commentator in later years to lament "It's probably the most regrettable loss in Northwestern architectural history: the unique Prairie School campus that never was". Frank Lloyd Wright would have predicted the outcome. What follows is point 13 in his list of advice given "To the young man in architecture": "Enter no Architectural competition under any circumstances except as a novice. No competition ever gave to the world anything worth having in Architecture. The jury itself is a picked average. The first thing done by the jury is to go through all the designs and throw out the best and the worst ones so as an average, it can average upon an average. The net result of any competition is an average by the average of averages.".
Toward the end of his life, when he was chairman of the Municipal Arts and Town Planning Committee of the Illinois Chapter of the American Institute of Architects, Maher became the driving force behind the restoration of the former Palace of Fine Arts, then a crumbling ruin which was by then the only major building that remained from the World's Columbian Exposition. In an article that appeared in The American Architect in 1921, Maher made the following observation, which indicates a predilection for classical architecture despite the conclusion one might otherwise come to upon examining his existing body of work: "For slightly over a million and a half dollars, Chicago could have, in perpetuity, one of the most beautiful specimens of architecture in the world ... It is universally agreed among architects, artists and critics, that the building is unequalled as a pure example of classical architecture. It is the last remaining memorial of one of Chicago's greatest achievements, the Columbian exposition." Maher didn't live to see what he had begun come to fruition, but during the Century of Progress in 1933 the Museum of Science and Industry opened in the newly restored building, a project which was funded largely with a $5 million gift from the philanthropist Julius Rosenwald (1862–1932), who was president of Sears, Roebuck and Company.
It is likely that Robert Seyfarth was introduced to Maher through family connections. Because Edward Seyfarth was an important local businessman, he would almost certainly have been familiar with the established architect's work that was being built in Blue Island.

=== Independent practice ===
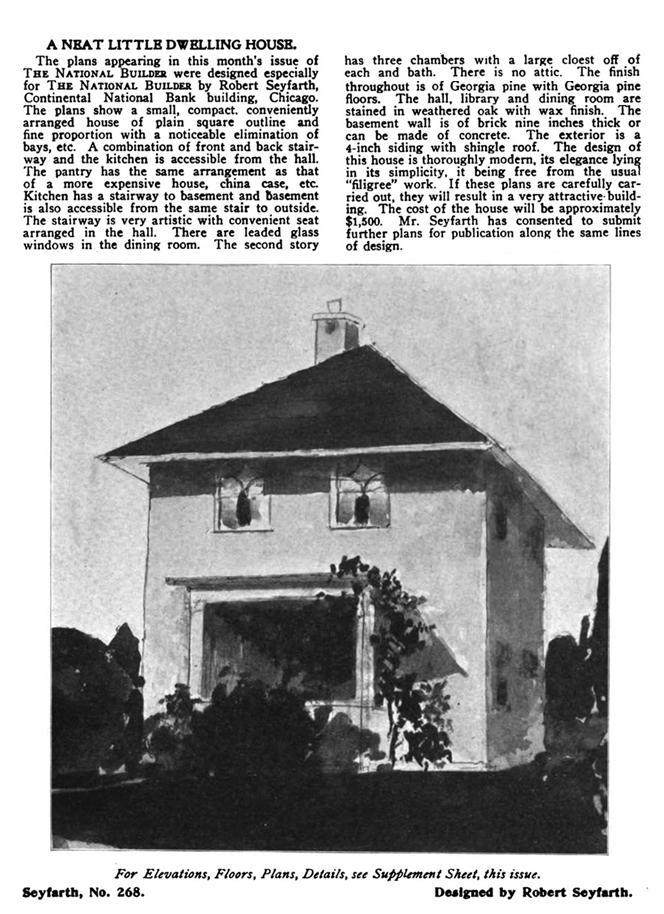
This is the earliest known example of Seyfarth's work to appear under his own name other than his own house in Blue Island. It appeared in the May, 1905 issue of The National Builder magazine.

Robert Seyfarth began to offer his services as an independent architect almost immediately after his graduation from Chicago Manual Training School. A late 19th century directory of Blue Island, published while he was most likely still working for the Chicago school board, contained a listing for "Robert Seyfarth, Architect" that showed the Seyfarth building (demolished 1992) as his address. After he began working in Maher's office his independent work began to show the influences of Maher and other Prairie School architects, and his earliest known independently attributed work comes at this time. In 1905 a "Neat Little Dwelling House" was published with plans, bills of material and estimate of costs in the May edition of The National Builder magazine.

Seyfarth earned his architectural license from the state of Illinois in October 1908 and continued to work for Maher until about 1909, at which time he opened his own practice. In the early years the office was located in the Corn Exchange Bank Building (1908, Shepley, Rutan, and Coolidge, demolished 1985) at 134 S. LaSalle Street, which was a short walk from the Chicago Stock Exchange Building. Seyfarth was likely drawn to establish his office there thru the influence of his Blue Island neighbor Benjamin C. Sammons (1866-1916), who was the president of the Bankers Club of Chicago and a long-time vice-president of the Corn Exchange National Bank. Seyfarth later moved into the newly completed Tribune Tower (1925, John Mead Howells and Raymond Hood), where he had an office on the twenty-first floor until 1934 when the Depression forced the move of his business to his home in the North Shore community of Highland Park. His was a small office - he did the design, drafting and supervision work himself, and for many years was assisted by Miss Eldridge, who typed specifications and generally kept the office running. After the office was moved to his home, he took as his assistant Edward Humrich (1901–1991), who himself became a noted architect after he left Seyfarth's employ shortly before the advent of World War II. Humrich enjoyed a distinguished career designing and building houses in the Usonian style of Frank Lloyd Wright. He earned his architectural license in 1968. In a series of interviews with the Art Institute of Chicago in 1986, he summed up Seyfarth's appeal: "He had an excellent sense of proportion and scale. His houses were all true to the North Shore ..., and they're outstanding. He had a knack, kind of a freshness to it, and it was good."
In 1911 Robert Seyfarth designed and built a gambrel roofed Shingle Style house for his family on Sheridan Road in Highland Park, across the street from Frank Lloyd Wright's Ward Willets house (1901), and it marked a change in the direction of his design work - for the rest of his career his would design in an eclectic style combining Colonial Revival, Tudor and Continental Provincial elements with strong geometric forms. During his career Seyfarth would design 73 houses in Highland Park alone, where his output began before the time of his arrival as a resident and lasted until shortly before his death. Here he elected to ignore the notion that in later years was famously offered to young architects by the Sage of Taliesin "... go as far away as possible from home to build your first buildings. The physician can bury his mistakes—but the Architect can only advise his client to plant vines.". Almost exclusively a residential architect with the majority of his work in the Chicago area, he also designed projects in Michigan, Wisconsin, Ohio, Virginia, Kentucky and Alabama. By the end of his career, he had designed over two hundred houses. One of his more important works is the Samuel Holmes House designed in 1926 and listed on the National Register of Historic Places. A shingle style house overlooking Lake Michigan, its landscaping was designed by Jens Jensen. Robert Seyfarth continued to live and work in Highland Park until his death on March 1, 1950. The Chicago History Museum Research Center has an archive consisting of drawings for 70 of Seyfarth's projects dating after 1932.

=== Client base ===
Seyfarth is sometimes considered to be a "society architect", and an examination of the body of his known work will bear this out, but only to a certain extent. One client of this class, Willoughby G. Walling (1878–1938), of Winnetka, IL, is known to have mingled with European royalty and with at least one President of the United States in his capacity as the acting director general of the Department of Civilian Relief and as Vice-Chairman of the Central Committee of the American Red Cross. His brother William English Walling was recognized by W.E.B. Du Bois as the founder of the NAACP, and Willoughby himself "...became a major spokesman for the Chicago movement". Here he worked alongside the noted social reformer Jane Addams and some of Chicago's wealthiest and most influential citizens, including Mrs. Cyrus McCormick, Mrs. Emmons Blaine [whose father-in-law James G. Blaine was variously a Senator, the Speaker of the House and the Secretary of State for James Garfield and Chester A. Arthur] and Julius Rosenwald.

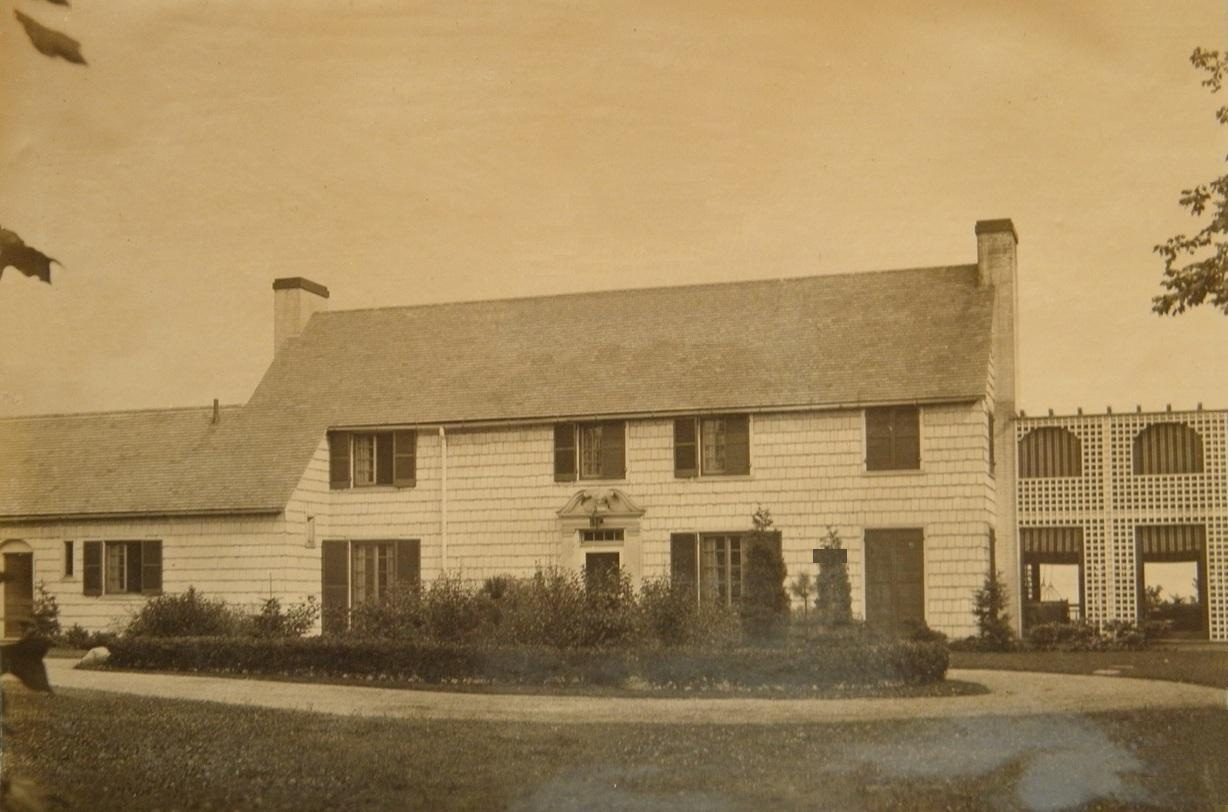
The Jessie Sykes Beardsley house, 1918 (shown here c.1920), Freedom Township, Ohio

Other wealthy clients exported Seyfarth's talents when they built houses outside the Chicago area. Norman W. Harris (of Chicago's Harris Bank), whose intown residence was also in Winnetka, raised Arabian horses at Kemah Farm in Williams Bay, Wisconsin where his family lived in a "white cottage ..., one of the charming, low, rambling houses for which Robert Seyfarth, its architect, is famous.". Another such client was Jessie Sykes Beardsley, who returned to her husband's farm in Freedom Township near Ravenna, Ohio in 1918 the year after his death and built a large house (locally known as the Manor House) which was designed by Seyfarth that she had commissioned, presumably while she was still in Chicago. Here she operated the Beardsley Dairy for a number of years. Her husband Orasmus Drake Beardsley had been the secretary and treasurer of her father's Chicago-based company, The Sykes Steel Roofing Company, which made a variety of products including roofing materials and pool tables. While there, according to the 1908 edition of The Chicago Blue Book of Selected Names, the Beardsleys lived at 4325 Grand Boulevard (now King Drive) on a street that today contains one of the most intact collections of residences built in the late 19th century for Chicago's elite. The same book also shows that Orasmus Beardsley was a member of various prestigious clubs, including The Chicago Athletic Association (where William Wrigley Jr. and L. Frank Baum were members) and the South Shore Country Club (now the South Shore Cultural Center), where he associated with the likes of Clarence Buckingham, John G. Shedd, John J. Glessner, Martin Ryerson, Clarence Darrow, Joy Morton and Willoughby Walling. The Beardsley's Freedom Township house was later owned by Ohio State Senator James P. Jones. Another among Seyfarth's clients of this type was the mail-order innovator Aaron Montgomery Ward (1843–1913), who was briefly a neighbor after Seyfarth moved to Highland Park c. 1910. All of this notwithstanding, however, a careful analysis will show that Seyfarth served a broad-based clientele, and although he has a number of small houses to his credit the largest percentage of his work was done for what would be considered upper middle-class clients.

== Marketing ==
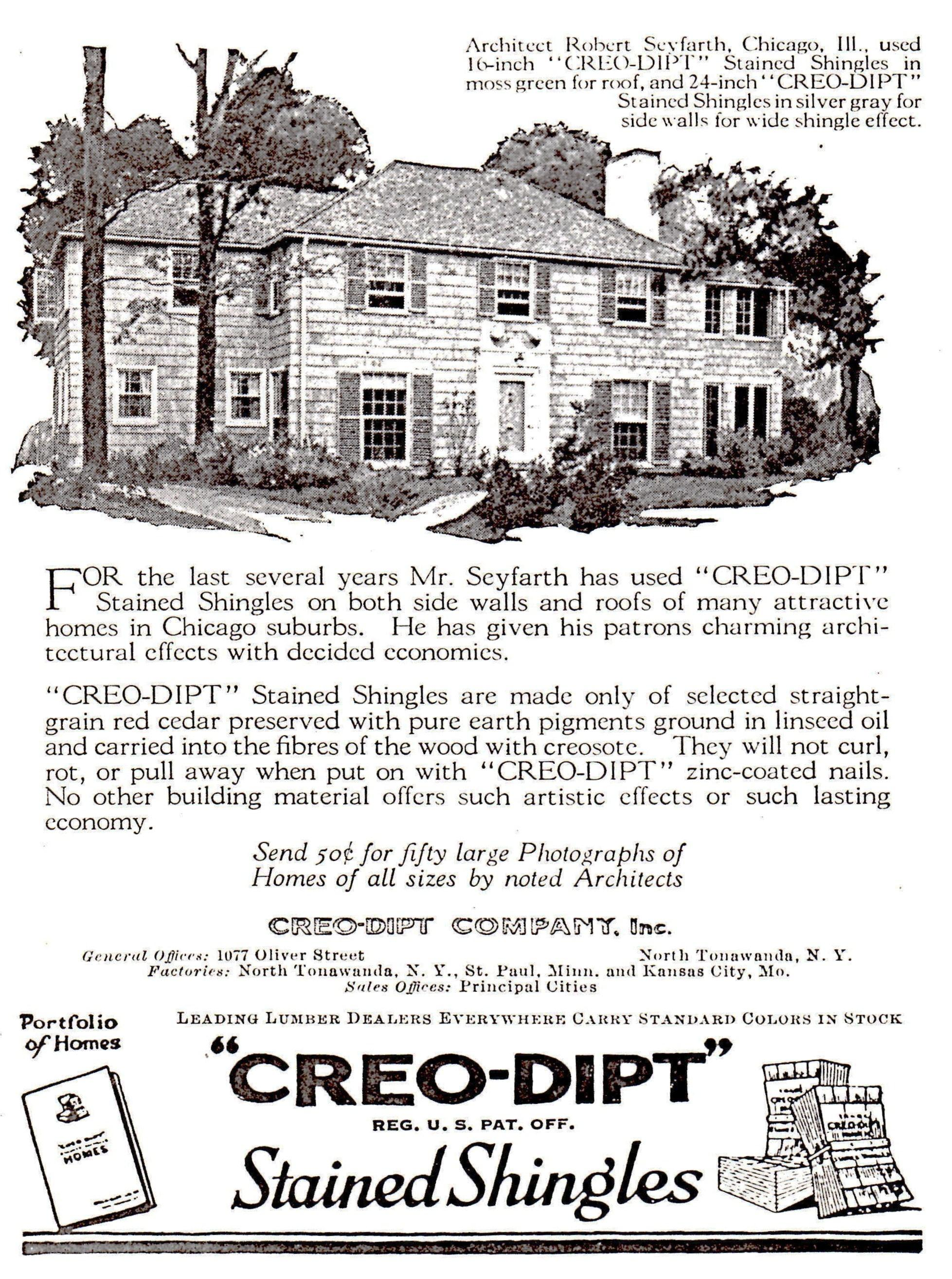
This advertisement features the house at 1236 Asbury Avenue in Winnetka, Illinois, which was designed c. 1920. That Seyfarth was not averse to appropriating the elements of one project to improve the design of another can be illustrated here using the Baroque doorhead and pilasters surrounding the front door of this house. It was used at least one other time - on the house at 2500 Lincoln Street (1925) in Evanston, IL., where the house this time was finished with red brick and Colonial revival in style.

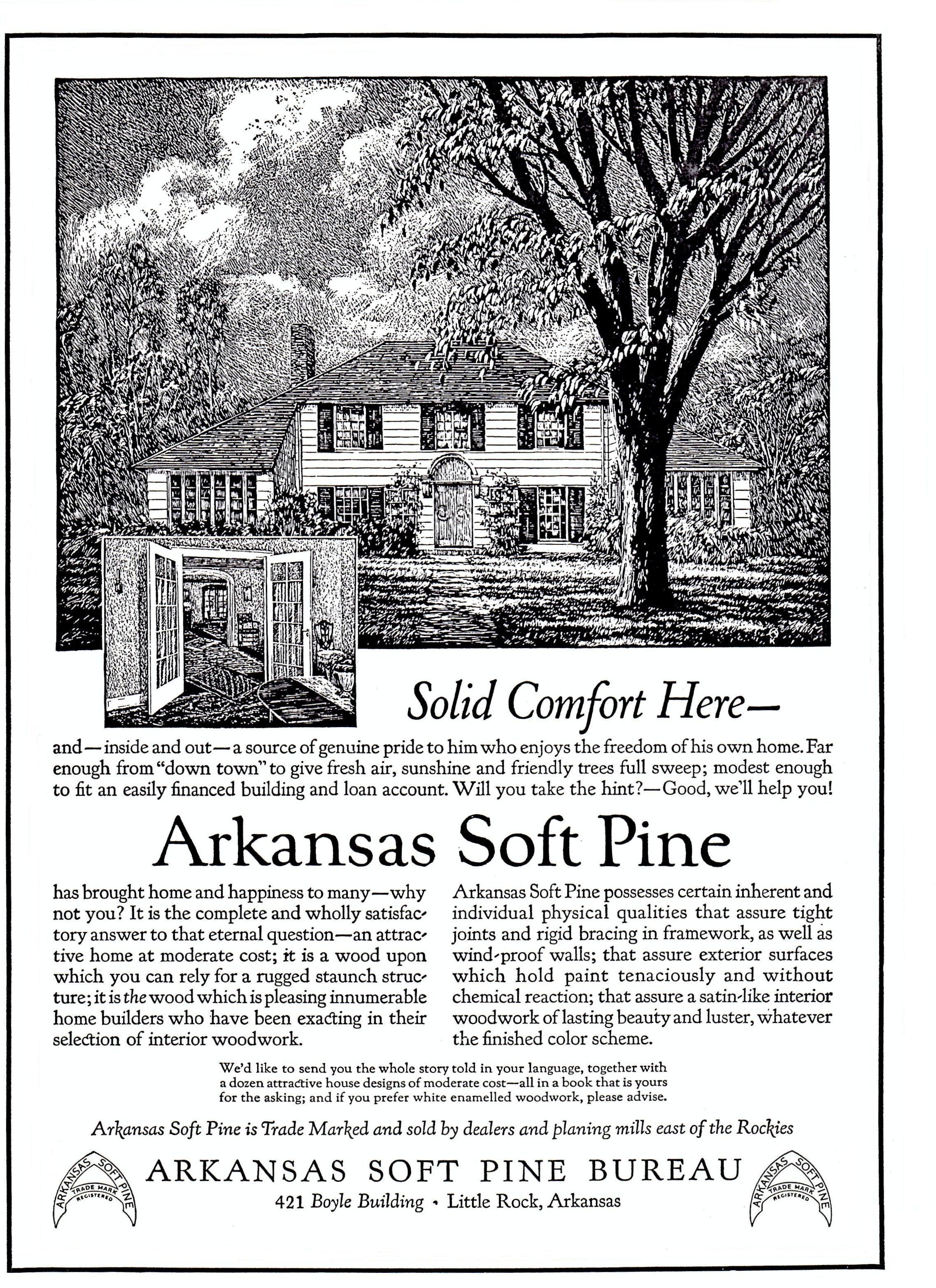
Although un-attributed in this ad for the Arkansas Soft Pine Bureau, this is the Alexander Stewart in Highland Park, IL, which Seyfarth designed in 1913 (see gallery picture 10 below).

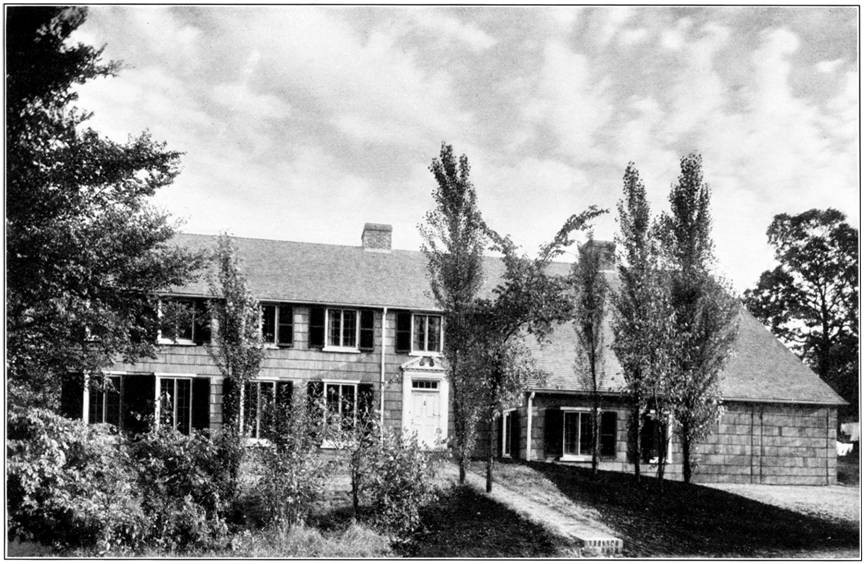
The house of noted author and journalist Bert Leston Taylor in Glencoe, IL. In her memorial to Taylor (B.L.T.), Eleanor Jewett had this to say "...Among his proudest possessions was his home in Glencoe, Ill, a house of comfortable proportions ... this type of house is one of the most attractive that the North Shore boasts. It is, on the surface, a homey home". The photograph above is from her March, 1921 article, and first appeared in The Home You Longed For. It was also used in an ad for the Creo-Dipt Company.

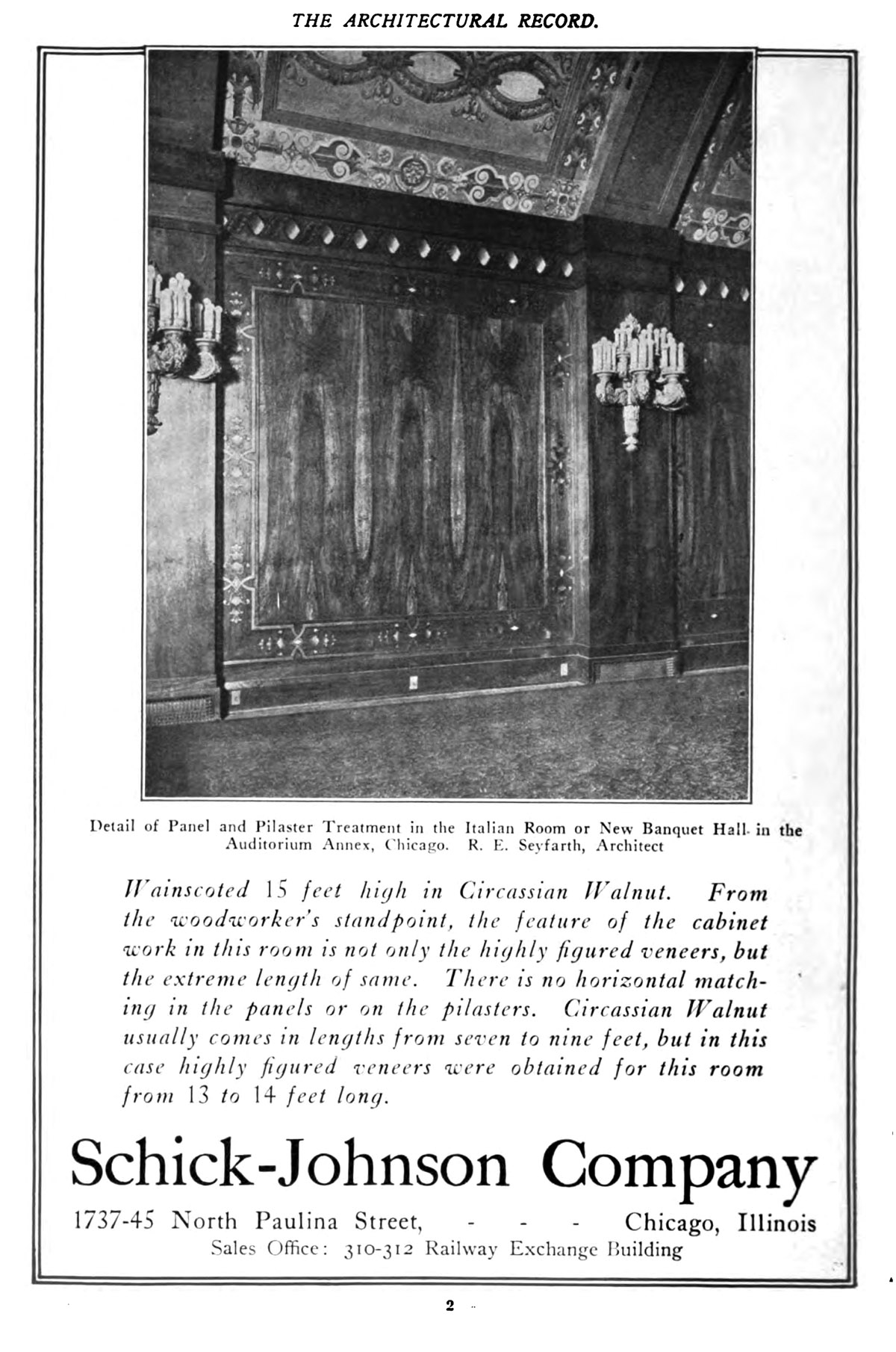
Advertisement for the Schick-Johnson Company that appeared in the December, 1910 edition of Architectural Record magazine. The company created the paneling for the Florentine Room, which Seyfarth designed for the north tower of the Congress Hotel in downtown Chicago. The building was designed by Clinton Warren and opened in 1893 as an annex to Adler and Sullivan's Auditorium Hotel (1889) to accommodate guests from the World's Columbian Exposition. In 1912 the Florentine Room was the site of discussions between Theodore Roosevelt and his opponents that resulted in the creation of Roosevelt's Bull Moose Party.

During his career, Seyfarth's work appeared in magazines and journals and in the advertisements of various architectural supply firms. The extent to which this was done is not entirely known, but articles by Eleanor Jewett (1892–1968), art critic for the Chicago Tribune ("Cape Cod Architecture seen in B.L.T.'s Home" discussing the Taylor house at 92 Dell Place in Glencoe, Illinois) and Herbert Croly of the Architectural Record ("The Local Feeling in Western Country Houses", October, 1914, which discusses the Kozminski and McBride houses in Highland Park at 521 Sheridan Road and 2130 Linden, respectively) survive to give us some idea of how Seyfarth's work was received during the time he was practicing. (Croly would later go on to become the founding editor of The New Republic magazine.) Additionally, photographs of houses he designed appeared in The Western Architect magazine a number of times in the 1920s. Also surviving are copies of advertisements from the Arkansas Soft Pine Bureau (see image, right), the California Redwood Association (again with the McBride House), the Pacific Lumber Company (featuring the Churchill house in Highland Park at 1375 Sheridan Road), The Creo-Dipt Company (see image, left), the White Pine Bureau, the American Face Brick Association and the Stewart Iron Works Company of Cincinnati (with a picture of the H. C. Dickinson house at 7150 S. Yale in Chicago). In 1908, his Prairie-style house for Dickinson was published in House Beautiful magazine. In 1918, the Arkansas Soft Pine Bureau released a 32 page portfolio featuring houses built from Seyfarth's designs. Included were photographs, floor plans, bills of material, an estimate of the costs, and a brief description of important features. Entitled The Home You Longed For, the booklet was announced in Building Age Magazine under the heading "New Catalogs of Interest to the Trade". Although generally unavailable today, it must have enjoyed a wide circulation in its time. It was acquired the following year for the collection of the Carnegie Library of Pittsburgh, and referred to that same year in an illustrated article that appeared in Printers' Ink Monthly entitled "The Loose-Leaf Portfolio - an Aid to Reader Interest", where it was described as "...a very attractive loose-leaf portfolio" and as a successful example of its type of publication.

The last known example of Seyfarth's work to be published during his lifetime appeared in the September, 1948 edition of Good Housekeeping magazine. The "Little Classic" was an expandable ranch that the magazine had commissioned which it noted featured "...a cornice [that] is pure sculpture - no jackscrews of mingled mouldings [to] confuse its clean profile." The illustrated article also pointed out that "...the porch at the head of the garden is reached through paired French doors from both the living and dining rooms." - even in this late example of Seyfarth's work the abstracted design and covered exterior living space continued to be important elements of the composition.

With a long history of having his work published, Seyfarth was following the example of George Washington Maher, who was widely published during his career. Articles by Maher and about him appeared regularly in publications that included Western Architect, Inland Architect, Architectural Record and Arts and Decoration.

== Selected projects ==
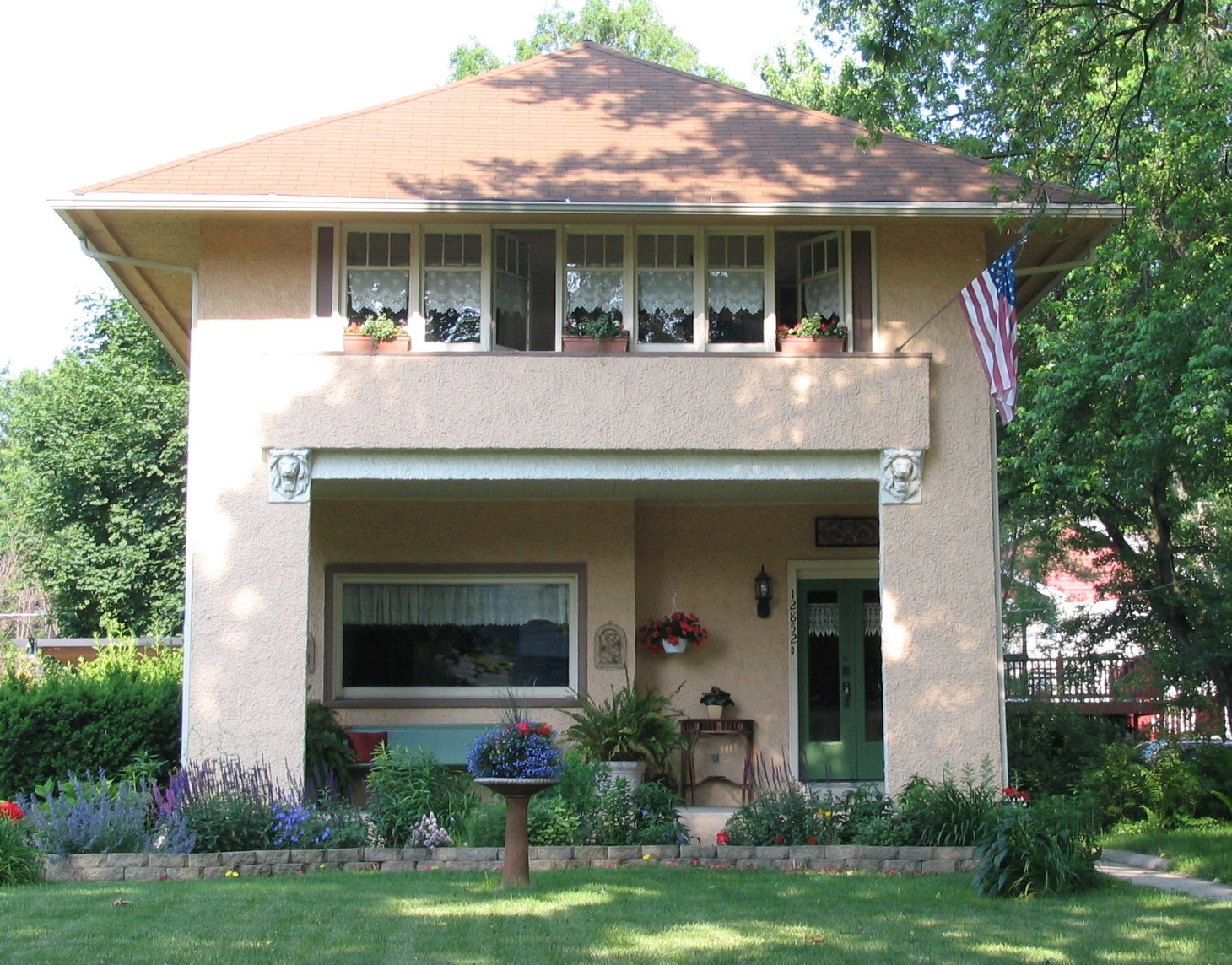
1. The first Robert Seyfarth house - 12852 S. Maple Ave., Blue Island Illinois, 1903.

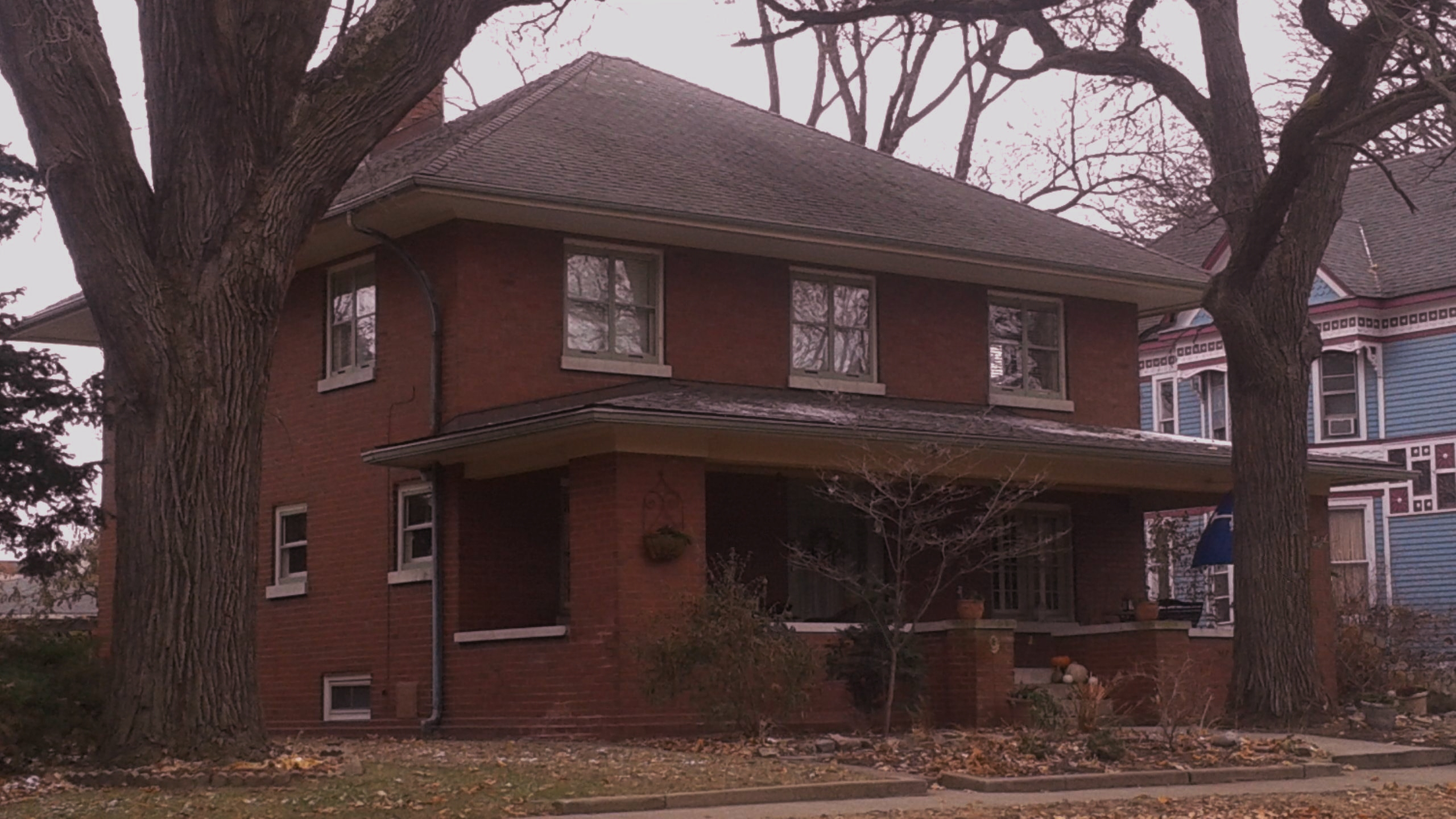
2. Joseph Schroth house - 12911 S. Greenwood Ave., Blue Island, Illinois, c.1906

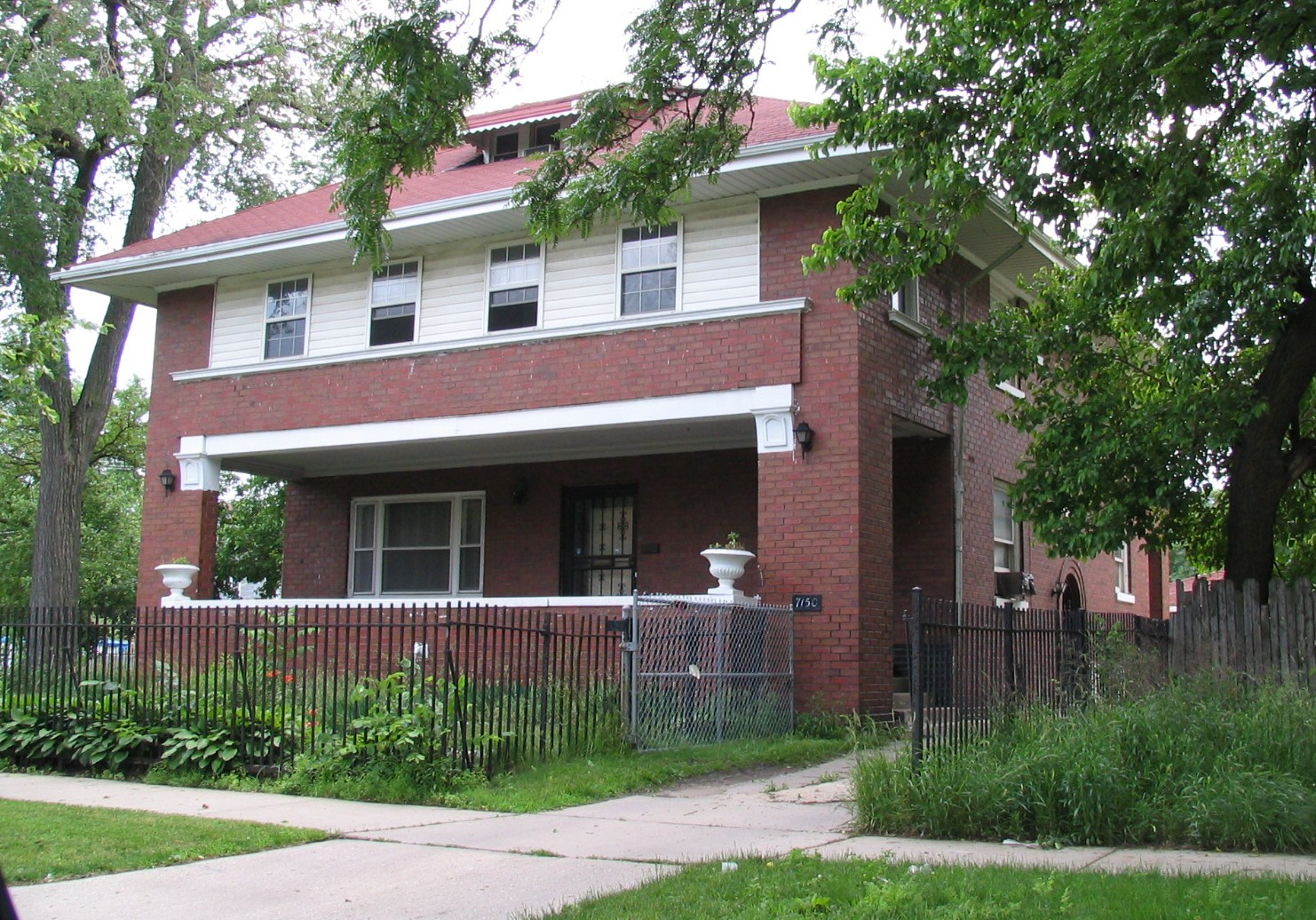
3. H.C. Dickinson house, 7150 S. Yale Ave., Greater Grand Crossing, Chicago, 1908

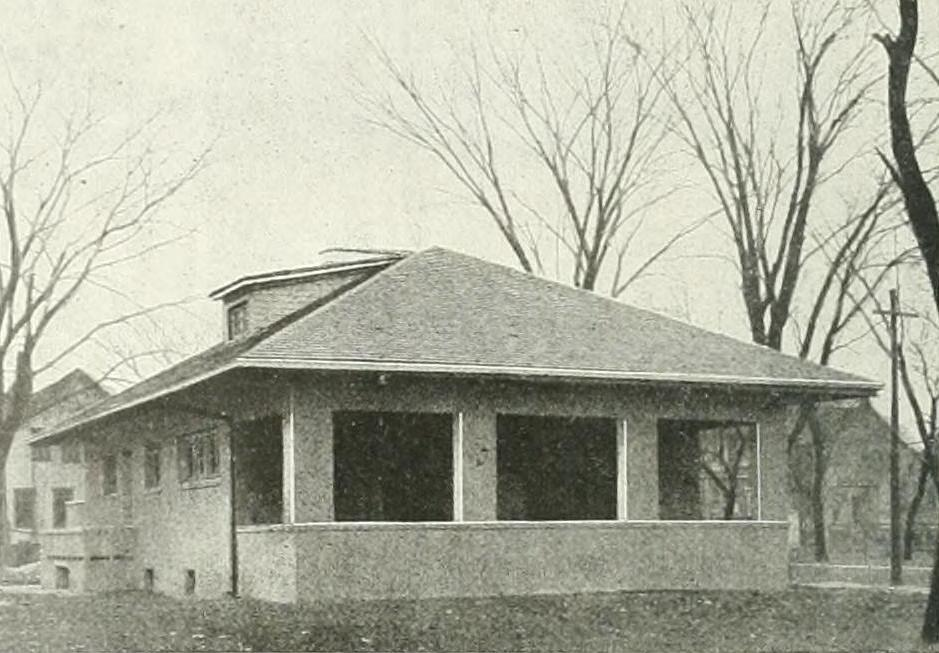
4. Kenneth Bullard House, 218 N. 2nd Ave., Maywood, Illinois, c.1908

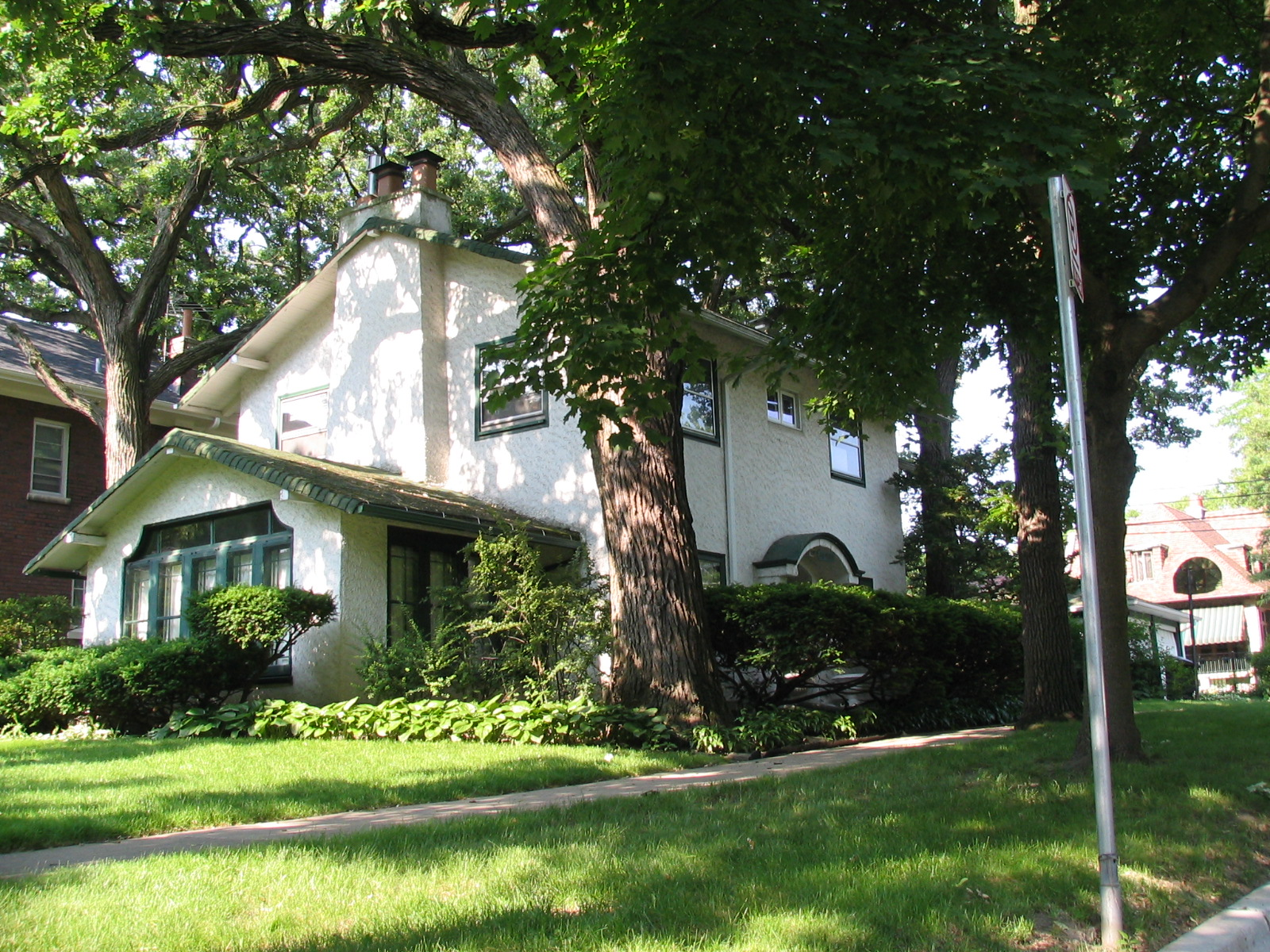
5. H.S. Crane house - 10400 S. Seeley Ave., Beverly Hills, Chicago, 1909

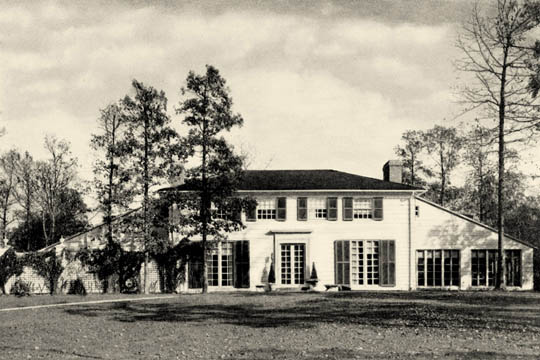
6. Maurice Kozminski house - 521 Sheridan Road, Highland Park, Illinois, c.1909

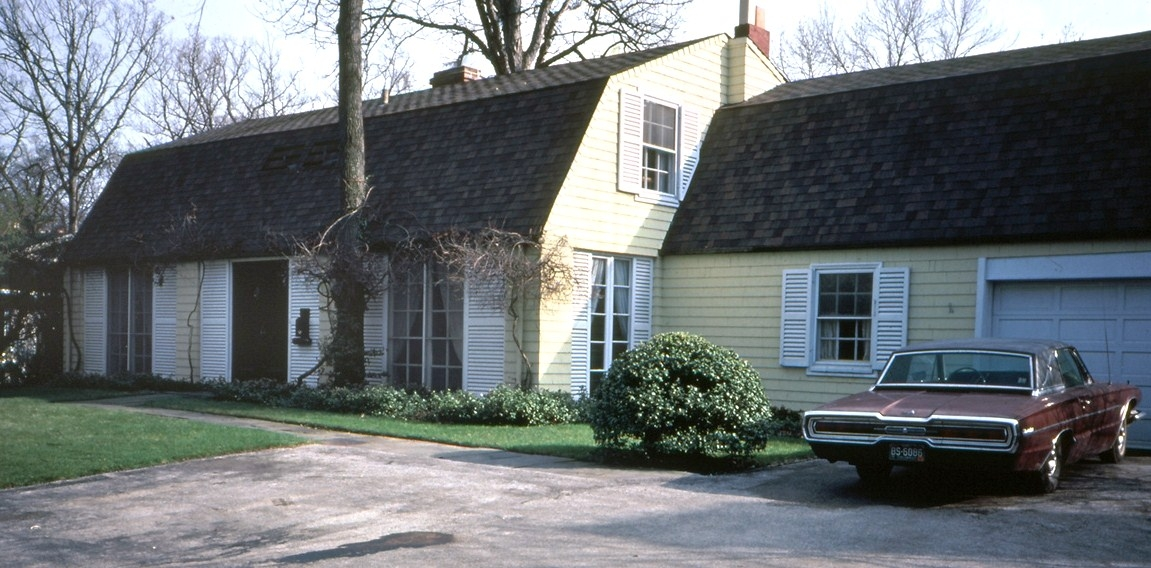
7. The second Robert Seyfarth house - 1498 Sheridan Road, Highland Park, Illinois, c.1910

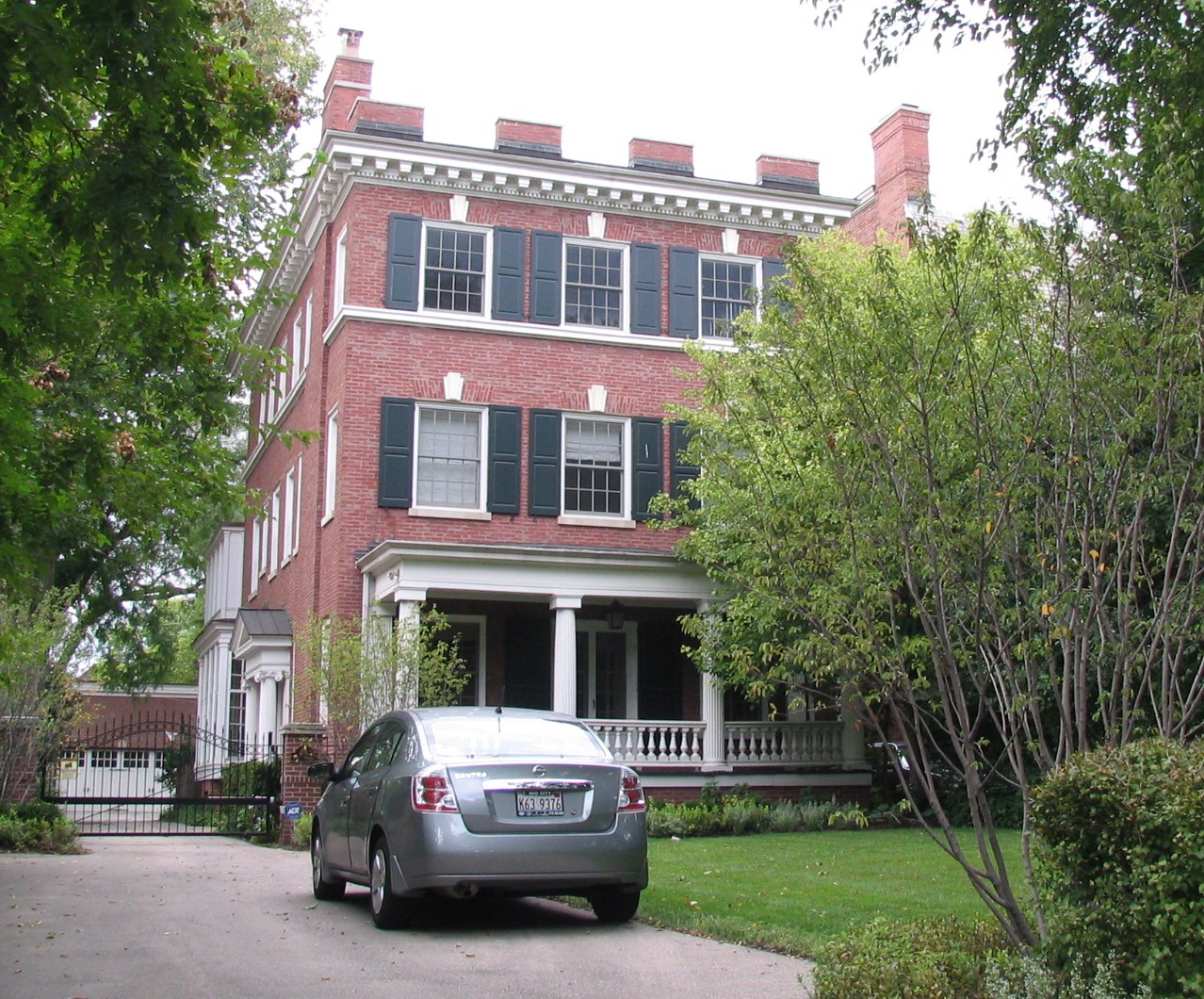
8. Daniel and Maude Eisendrath house - 4840 S. Woodlawn Ave., Kenwood, Chicago, 1910

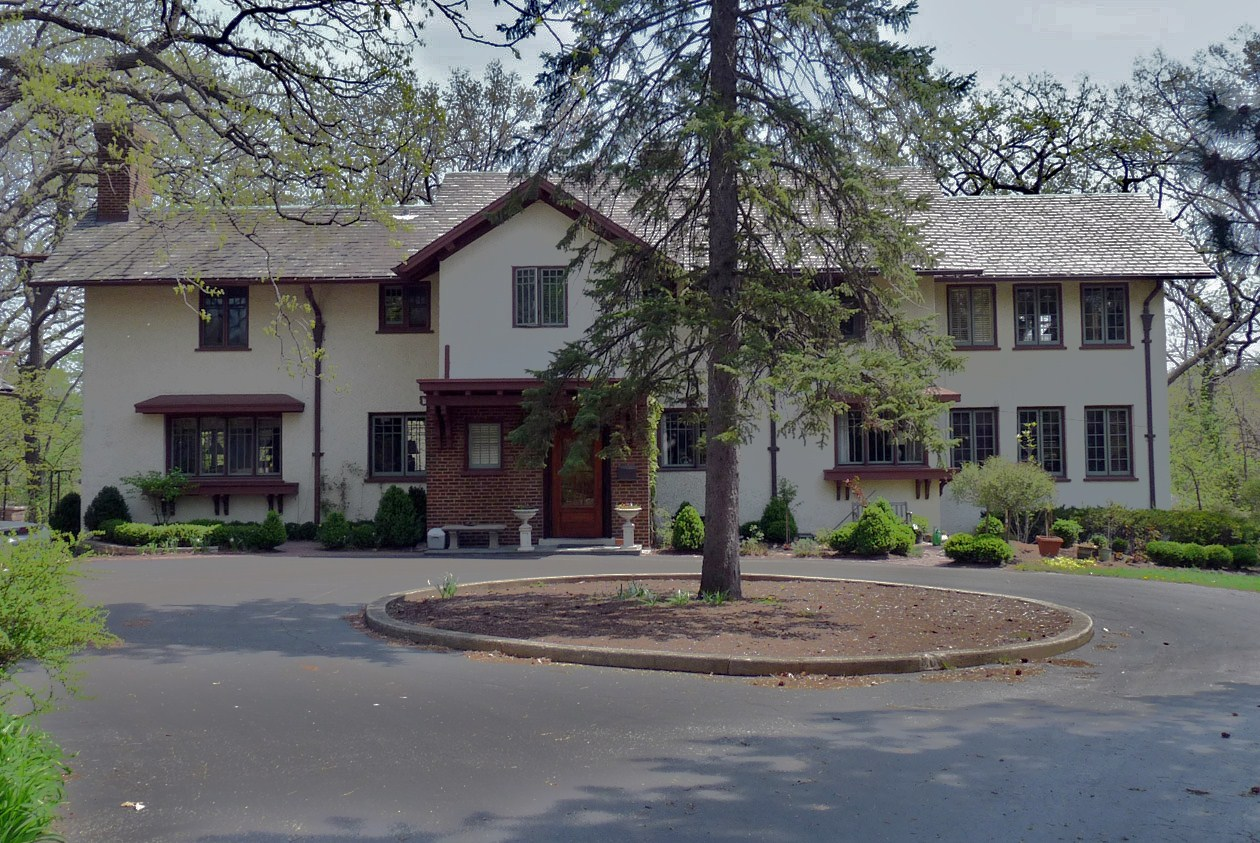
9. Samuel E. Thomason house - 10451 S. Seeley Ave., Beverly Hills, Chicago, 1910

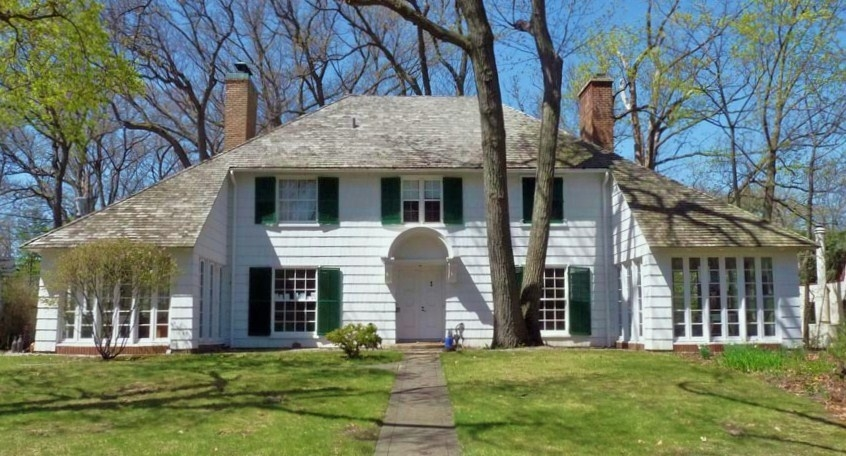
10. Alexander Stewart house - 1442 Forest Ave., Highland Park, Illinois, 1913

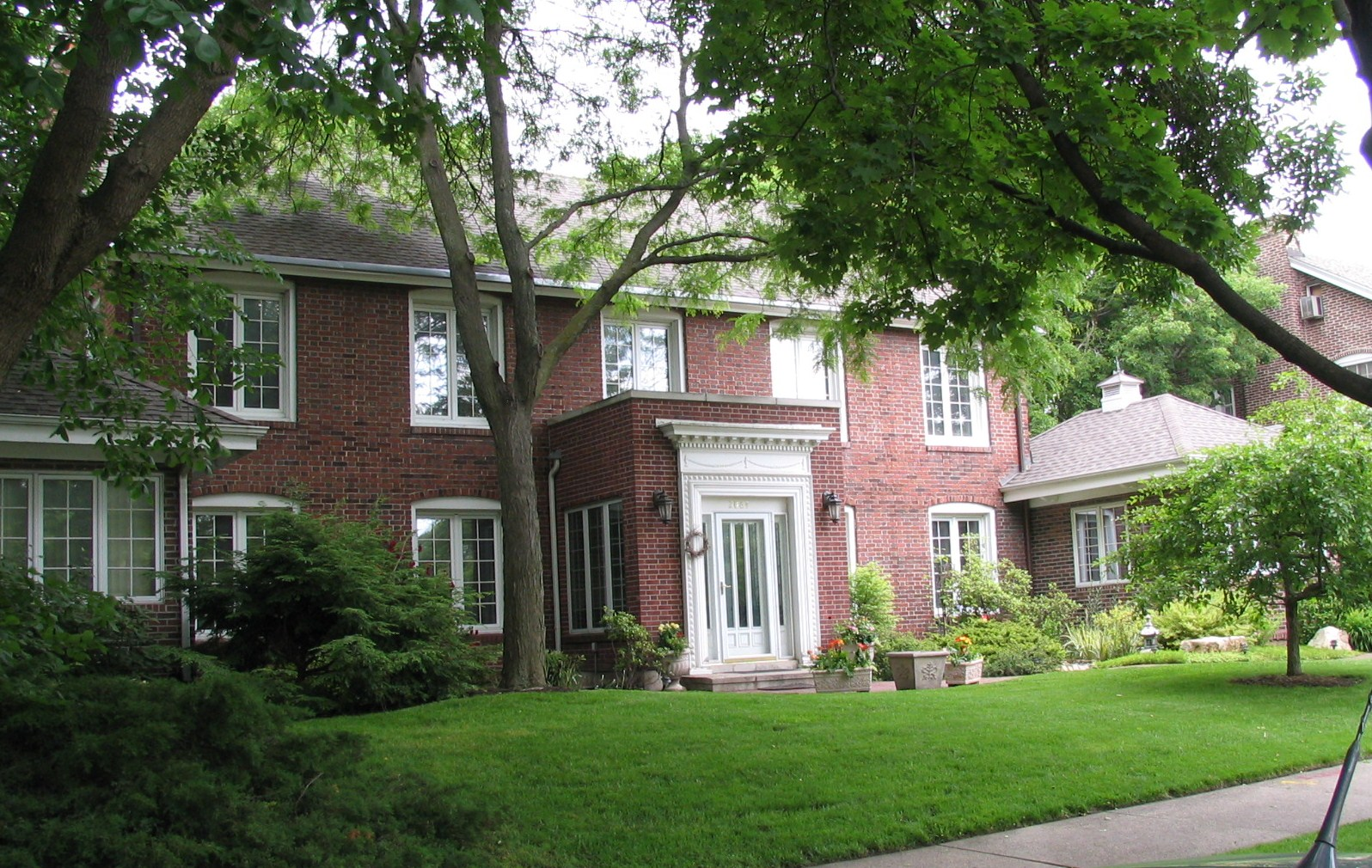
11. William J. McDonald house - 2064 W. Pratt Blvd., West Ridge, Chicago, 1914

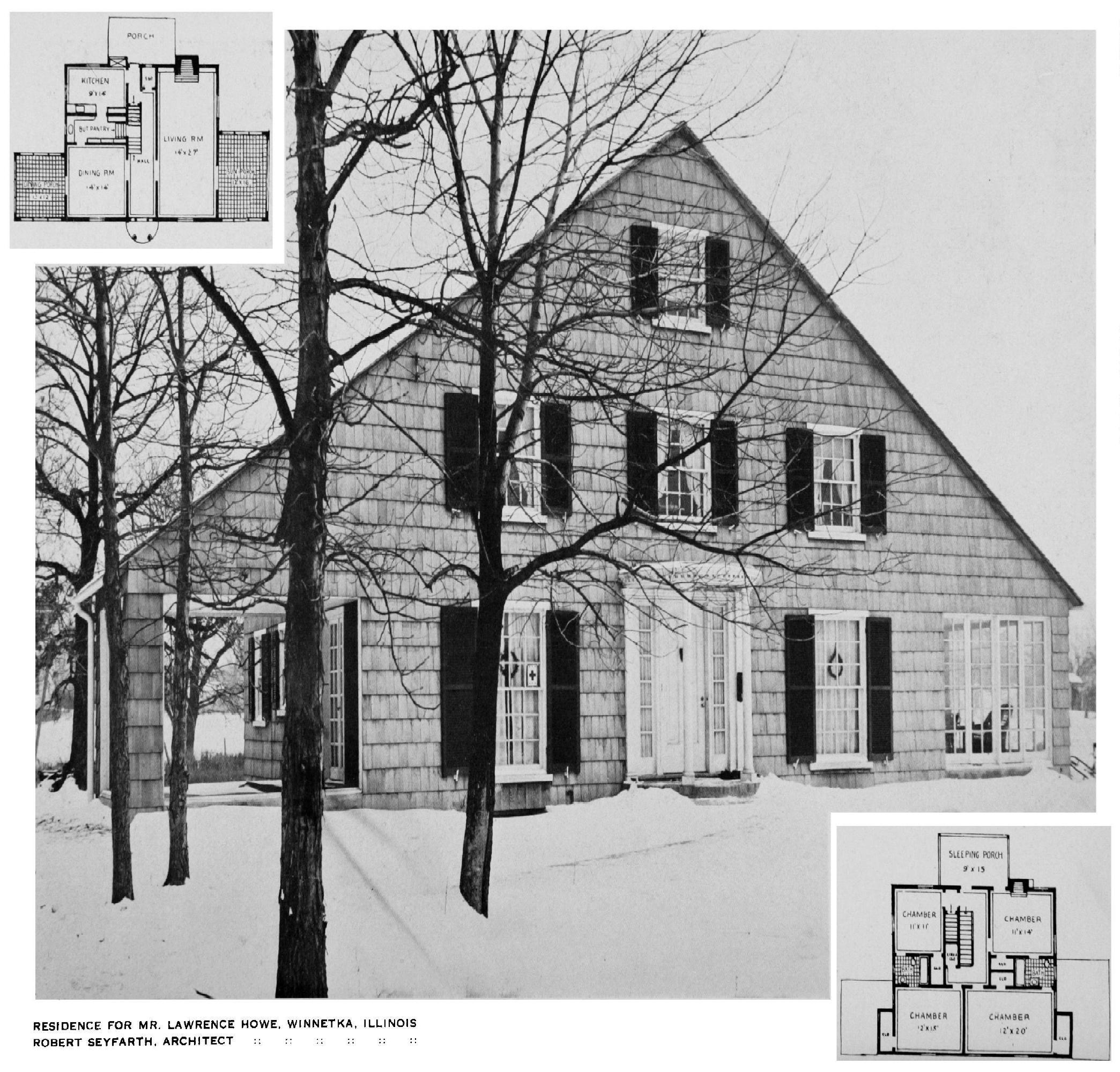
12. Lawrence Howe house - 175 Chestnut St., Winnetka, Illinois c.1916

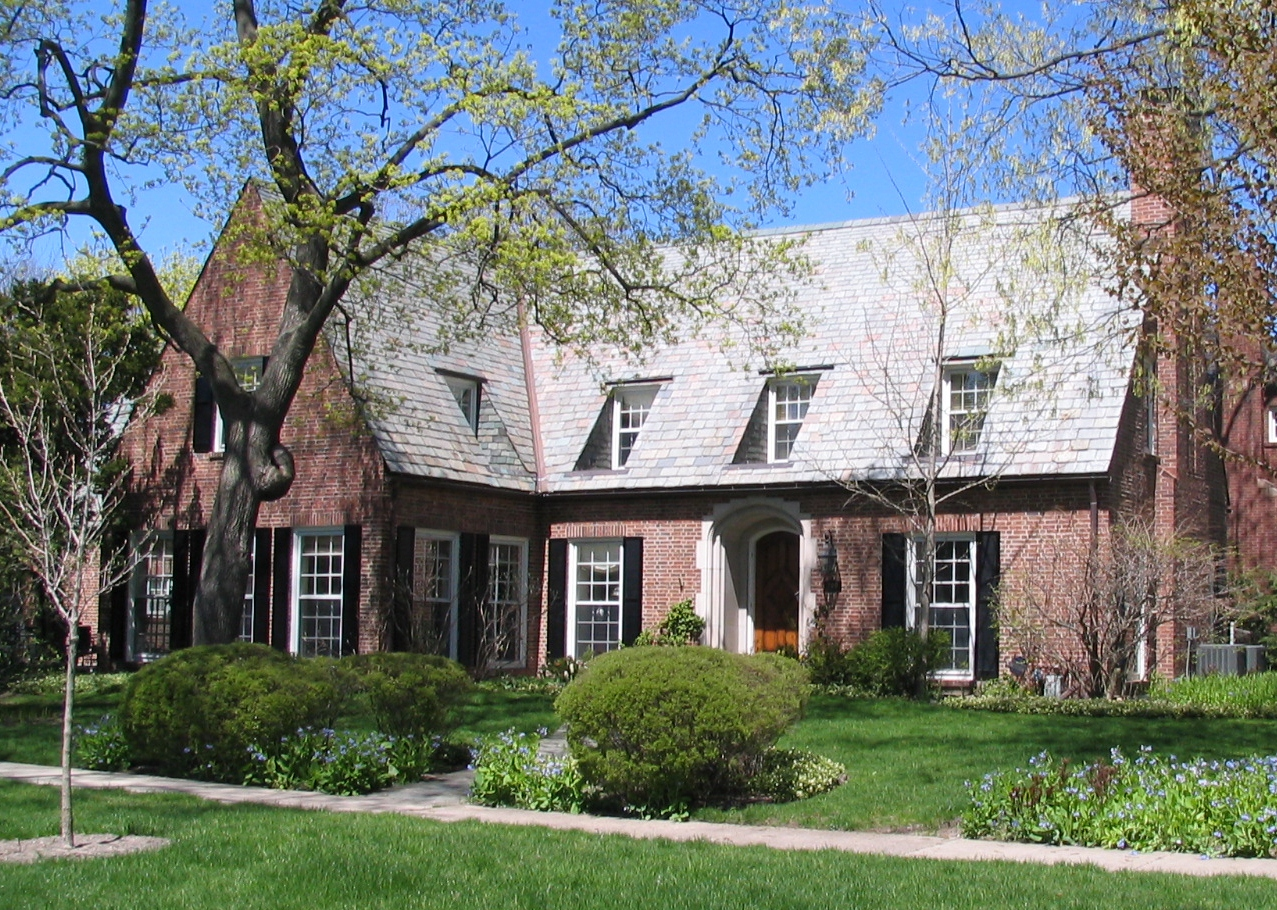
13. 700 Greenwood Ave., Wilmette, Illinois, c. 1926

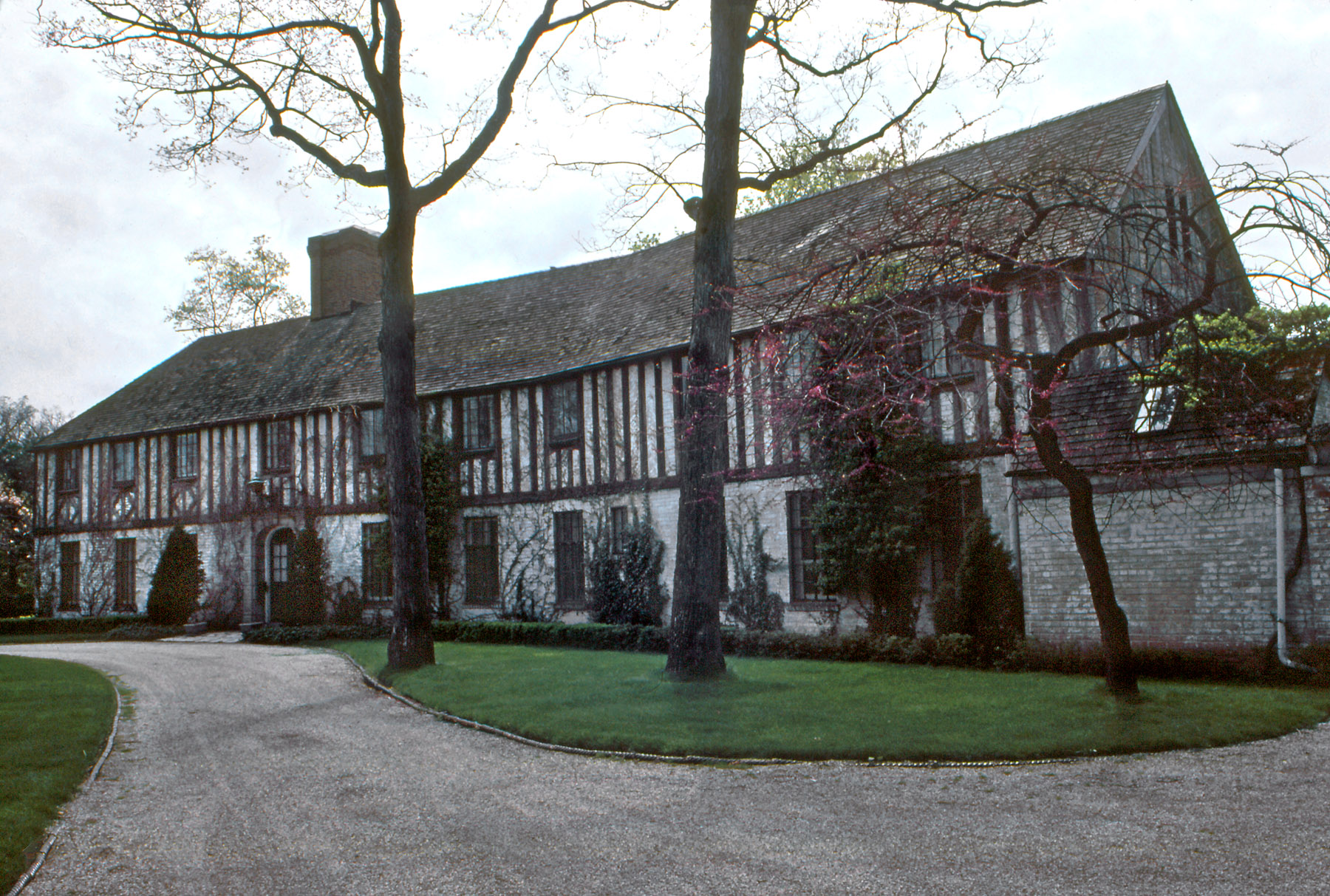
14. Abel Davis house - 600 Sheridan Road, Glencoe, Illinois, c. 1926

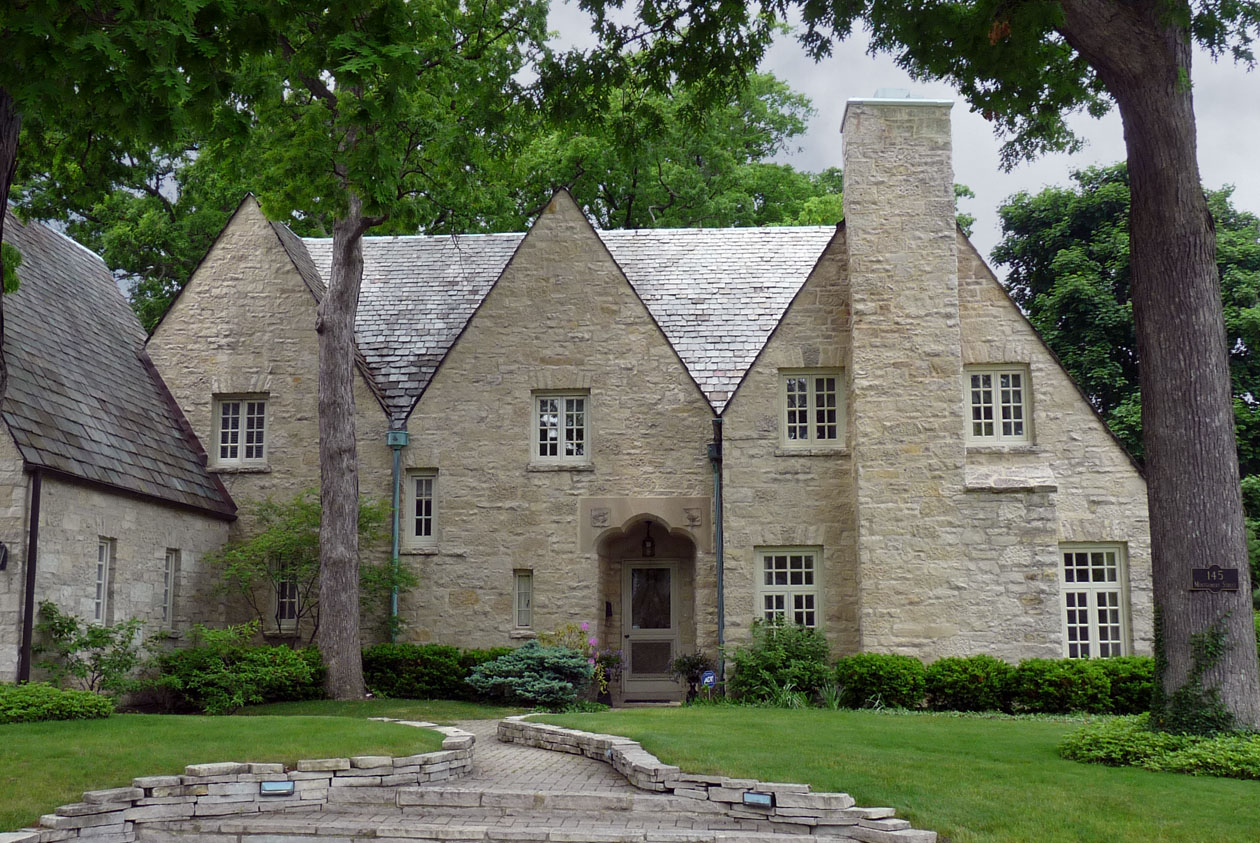
15. Mayfield house - 145 Montgomery St., Glencoe, Illinois, c. 1926

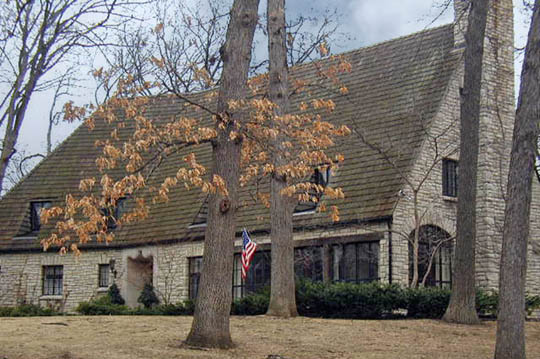
16. E. Gifford Upjohn house - 2230 Glenwood, Kalamazoo, Michigan, 1926

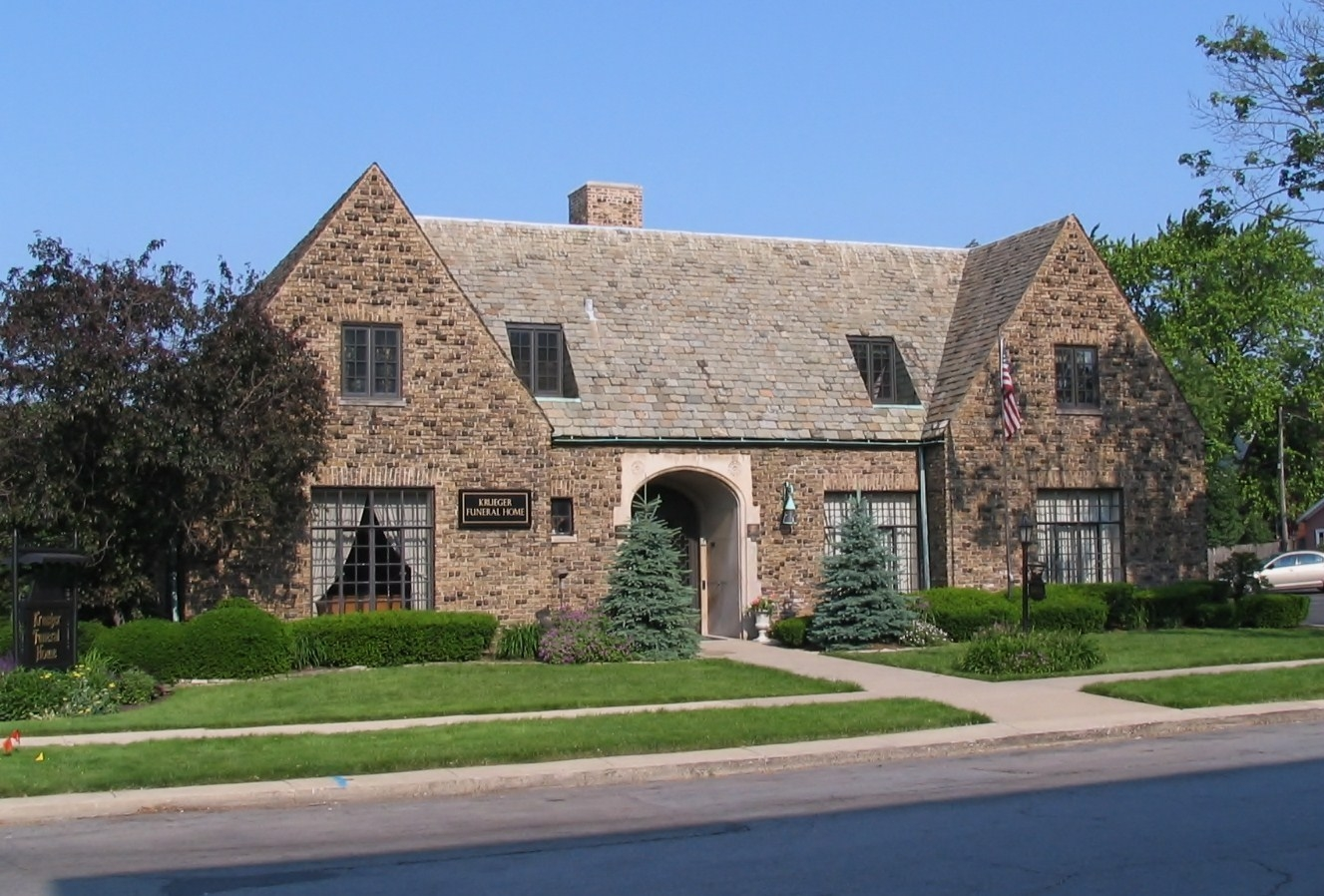
17. The Krueger Funeral Home - 13050 S. Greenwood Ave., Blue Island Illinois, 1927

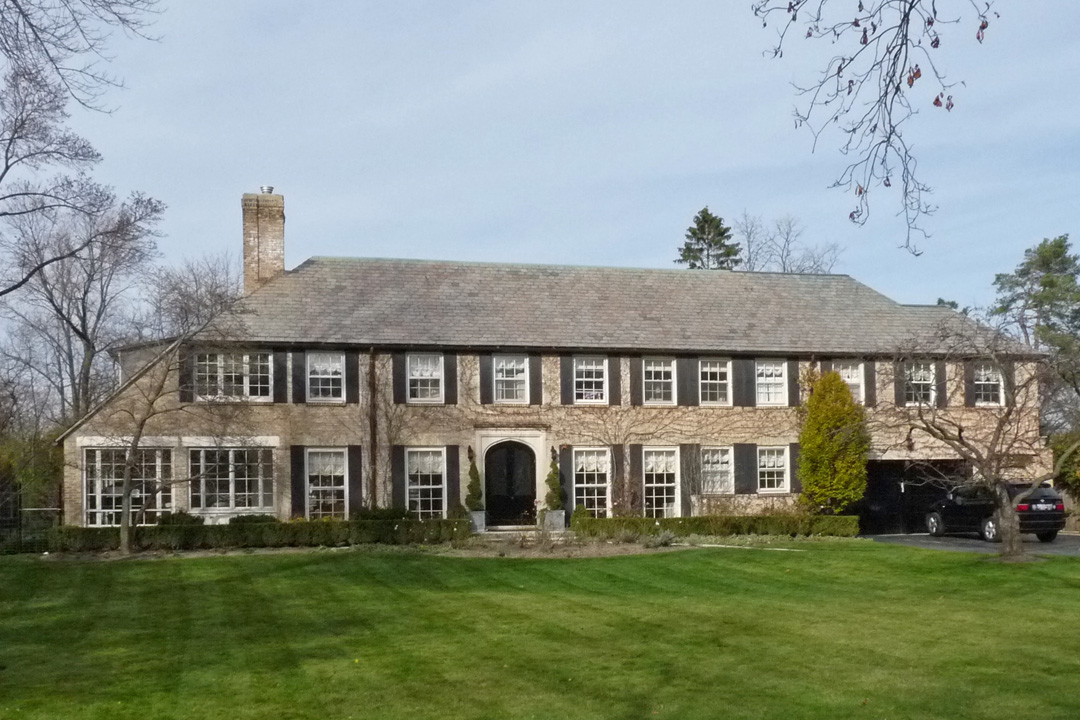
18. Wagstaff house - 181 Hawthorn, Glencoe, Illinois, c. 1927

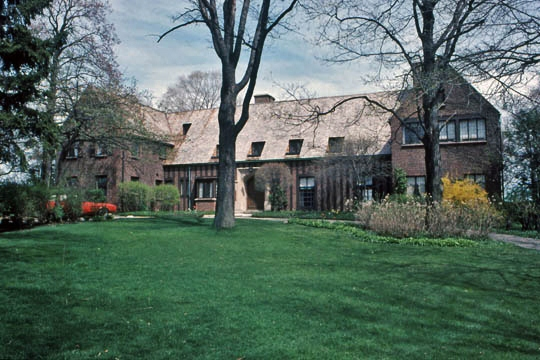
19. Harry Adamson house - 2219 Egandale Road, Highland Park, Illinois, c.1927

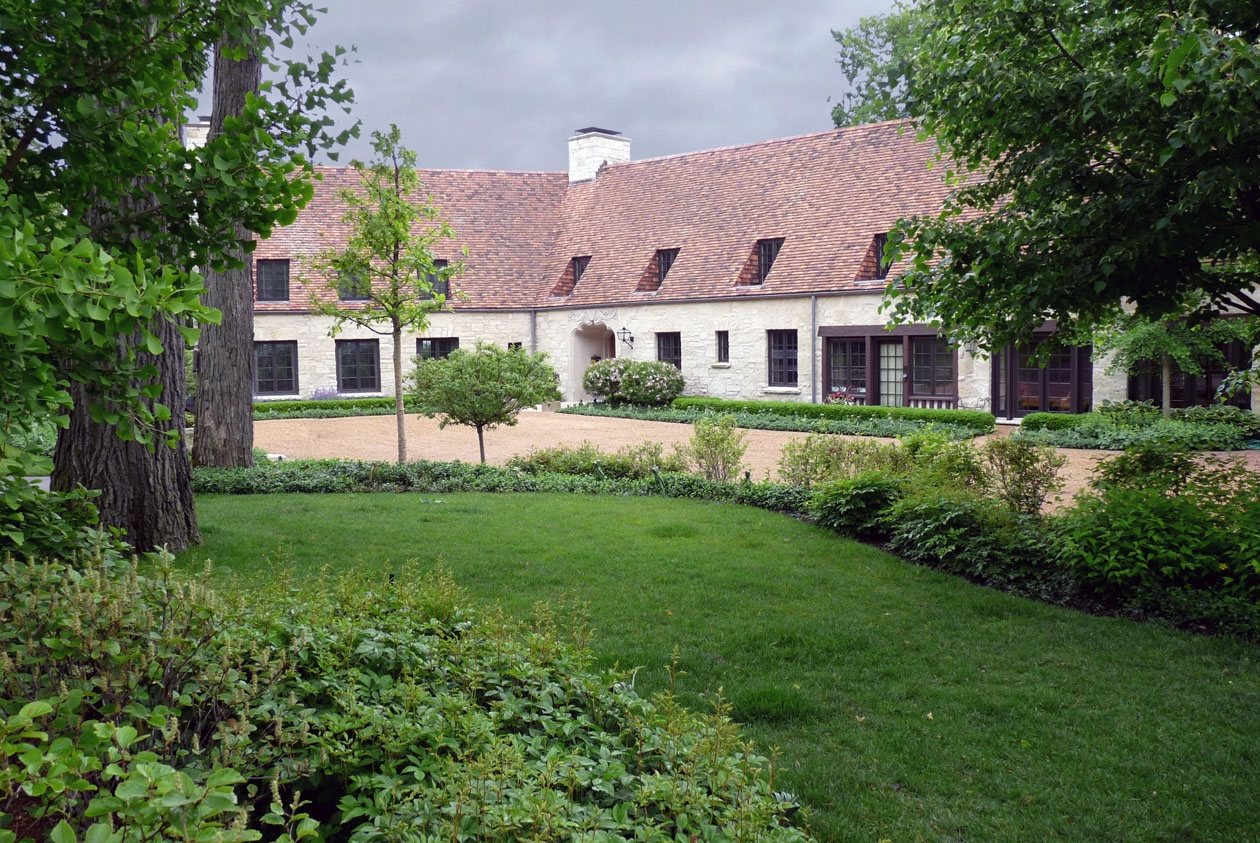
20. J.C. Aspley house - 20 Maple Hill Road, Glencoe, Illinois, 1928-1929

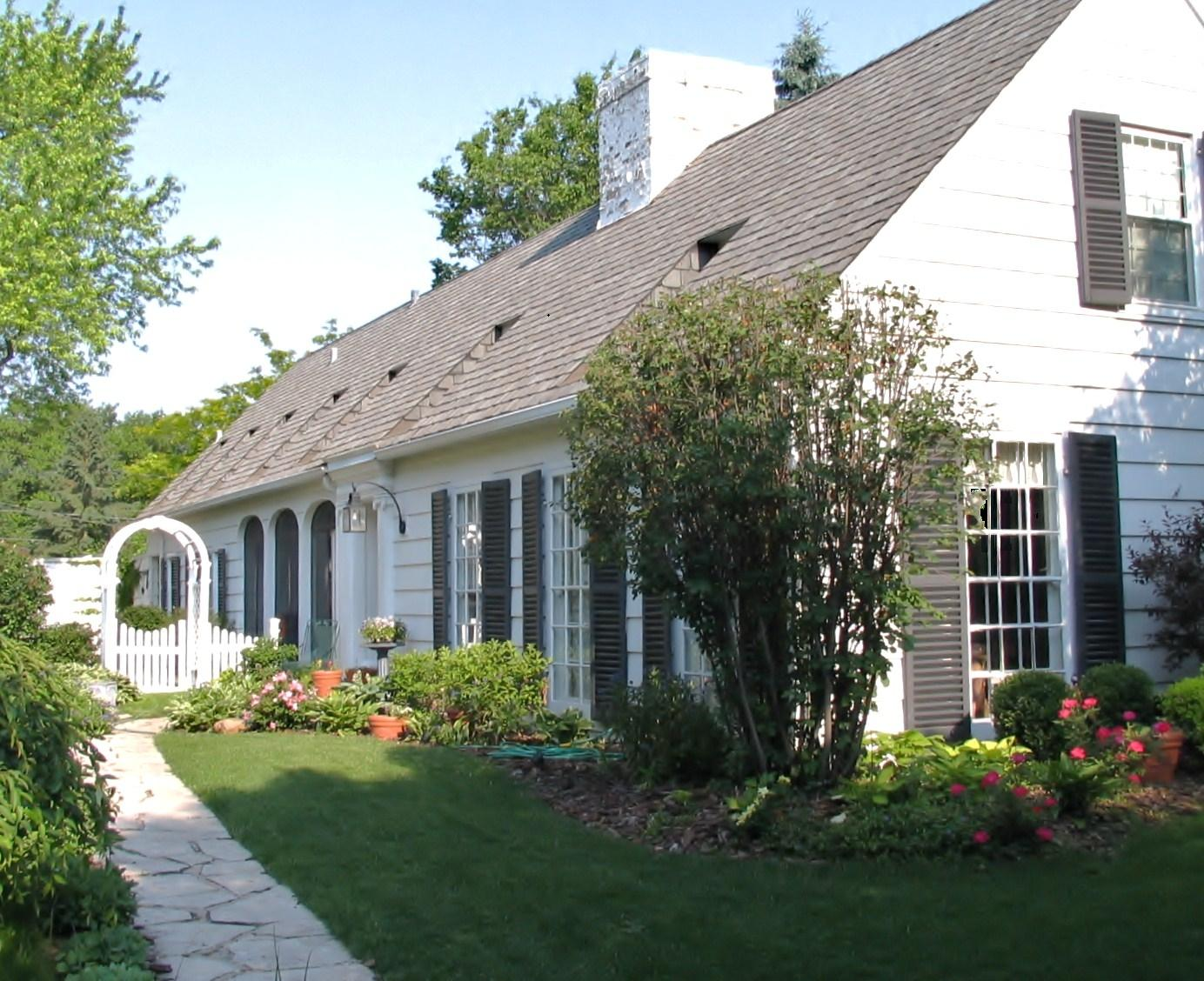
'21. Arthur Seyfarth house - 12844 S. Greenwood Ave., Blue Island Illinois, 1929

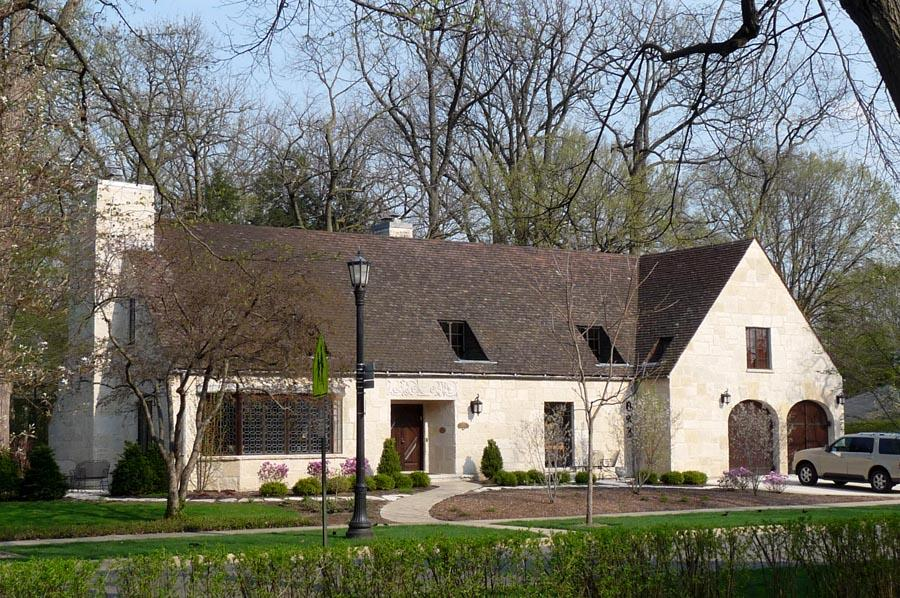
22. Roscoe Page house - 2424 Lincoln St., Evanston, Illinois, c.1934

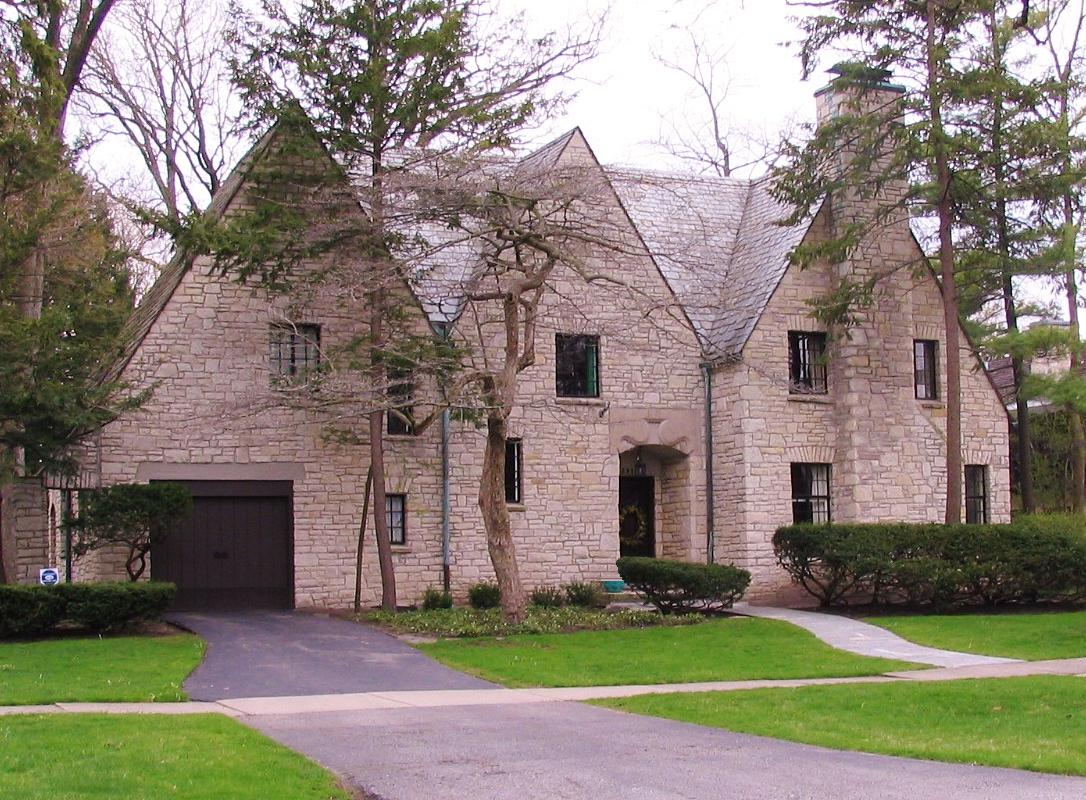
23. Freeman house - 2418 Lincoln St., Evanston, Illinois, 1935

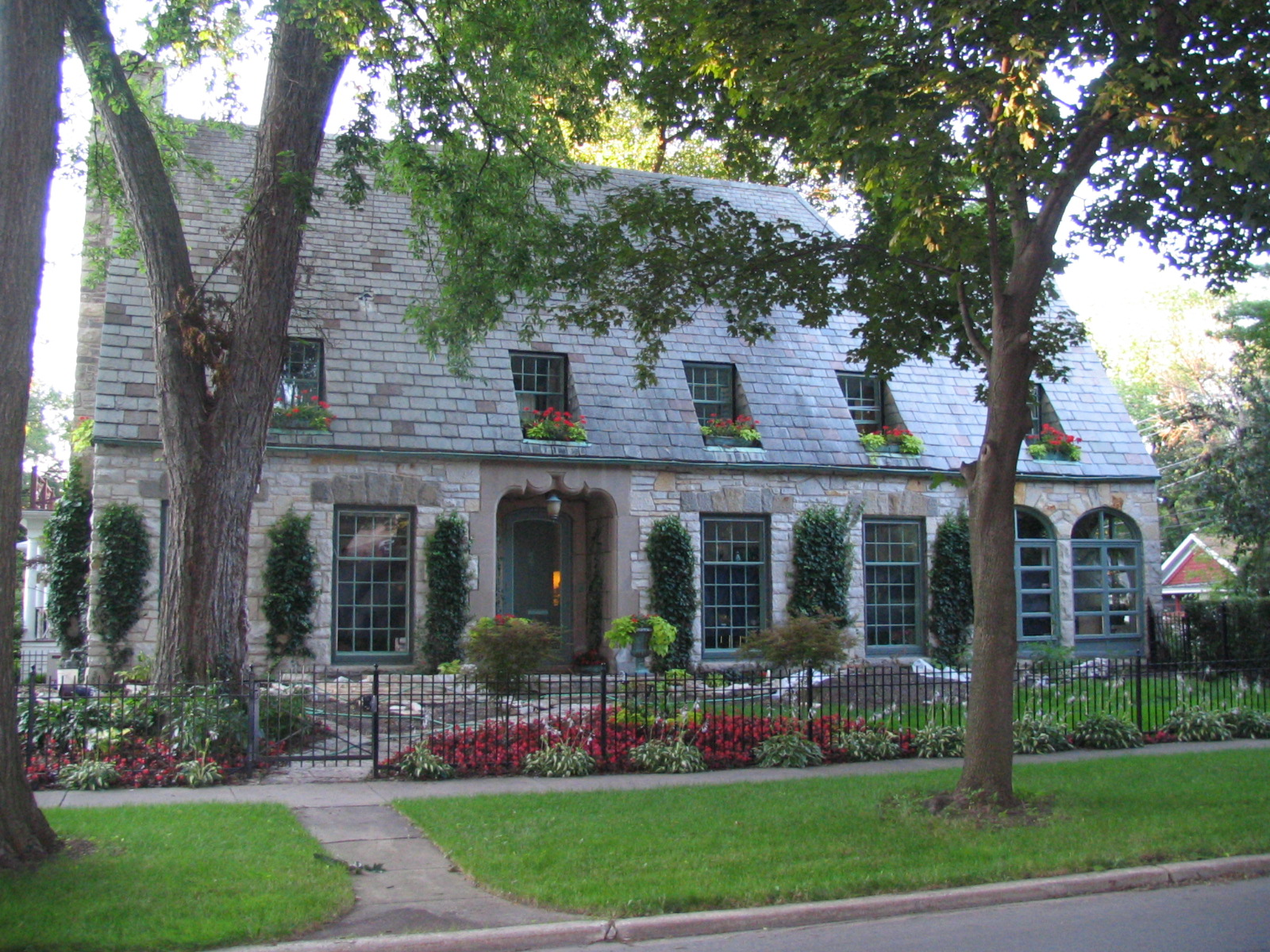
24. Ashley Smith house - 700 Fair Oaks Ave., Oak Park, Illinois, c.1938.

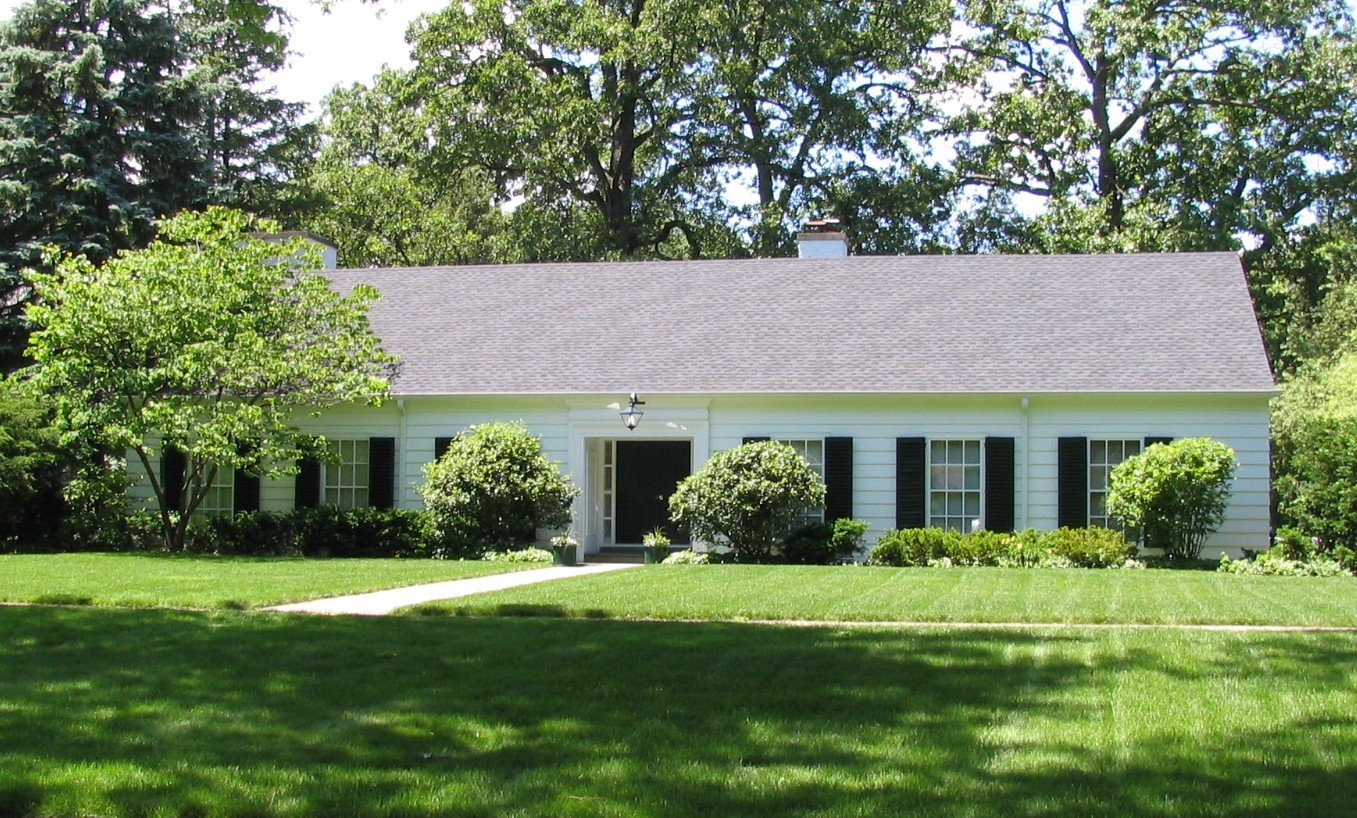
25. Russell E. Q. Johnson house - 2730 Broadway Ave., Evanston, Illinois c. 1949, built 1956

=== Notes on the pictures ===
- 1.) The first Robert Seyfarth house. This simple Prairie School house was built while Seyfarth was still working for George Washington Maher. The older architect's influence is clearly evident here, down to the use of a Maher hallmark, the lion's head, which appear here as brackets to "support" the second floor sleeping porch balcony. Seyfarth had used this feature shortly before in his design for the cabinetry and fireplace for the Samuel Nickerson house (now The Richard H. Driehaus Museum) at 25 East Erie Street in Chicago, which Maher renovated for Lucius Fisher in 1900-1901. A 1904 photograph in the collection of the library at Lake Forest College shows this house with the apertures of the sleeping porch only screened in the manner of the front porch of his second house in Highland Park, suggesting that Seyfarth also intended this building's now-enclosed counterpart on the Ellis house in Beverly to be open to the weather, as was the sleeping porch on the Dickenson house in the Chicago neighborhood of Greater Grand Crossing (see item #2 below). The photo also shows Seyfarth's use of a striated pattern in the shingles on the roof that Maher would use in 1907 on the Henry Schultz house in Winnetka, Illinois and the Kenilworth Club (in Kenilworth, Illinois), and on occasional other projects over the years.

The house could be a study for the Ernest J. Magerstadt house which Maher built at 4930 S. Greenwood Avenue in the Kenwood neighborhood of Chicago in c.1908. It appeared in the background of establishing shots in the 2011 New Line Cinema film The Rite, which starred Anthony Hopkins and Colin O'Donoghue.

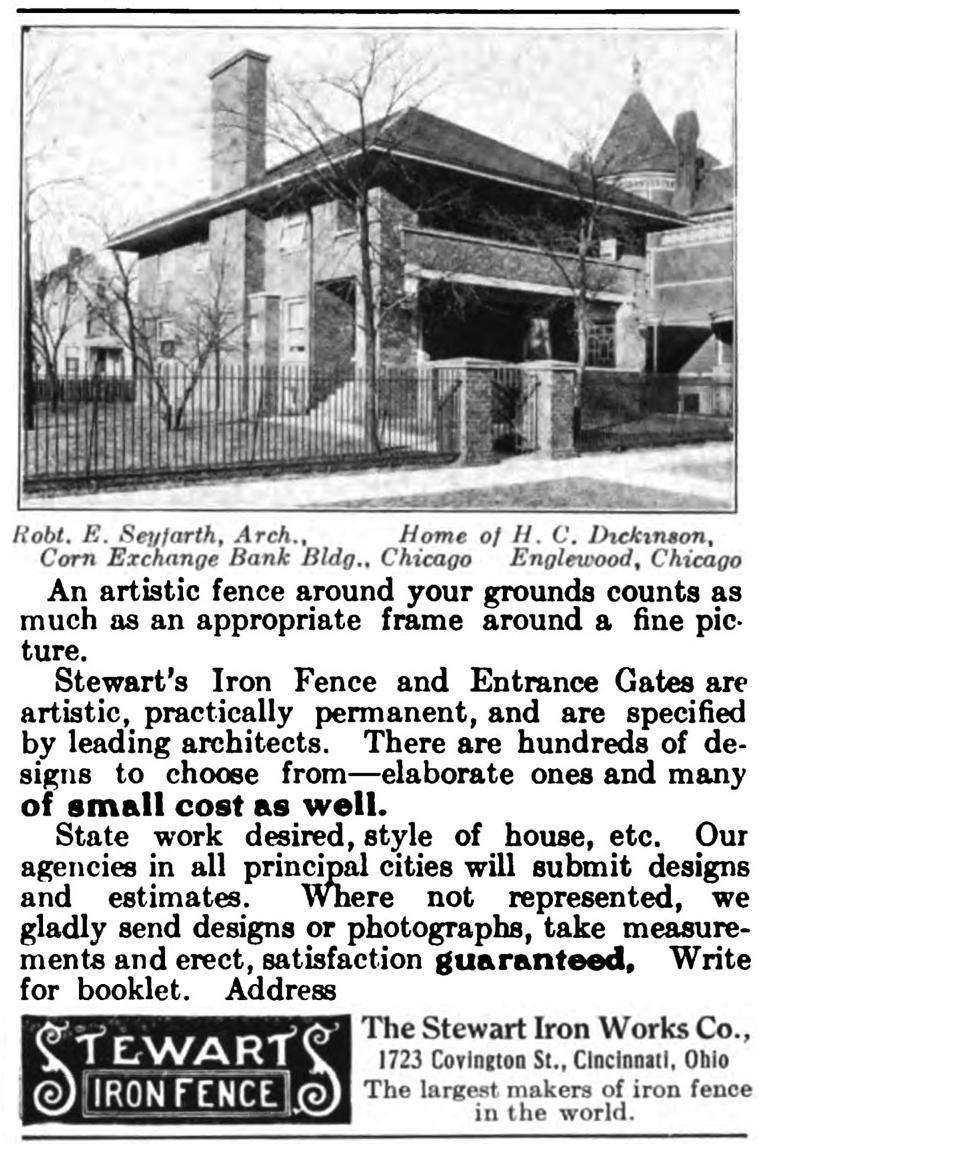
The Dickinson house as it appeared in an advertisement for the Stewart Iron Works Co. in the February 1909 edition of House and Garden.

- 3.) H.C. Dickinson house. This is the first Robert Seyfarth house, writ large, in brick and stone. Although the sleeping porch on the second floor has been enclosed in a manner not in keeping with the style of the house, this house is otherwise also very similar in composition to the John Ellis house in Beverly Hills, Chicago (1908), which shows that Seyfarth, like many of his profession, felt free to copy himself to develop, refine or expand upon an idea further for another client when necessary. Note that the house retains the wrought iron fence that appeared with it in the 1909 ad for the Stewart Iron Works Co. (see left).
- 4.) Kenneth Bullard house. The house is shown here as it appeared in the November 1912 edition of The Canadian Builder and Carpenter magazine. The picture and accompanying text were included under the heading "Two Prize Concrete Block Buildings – Editorial Correspondence" as a result of the house's having won a competition sponsored by the Ideal Concrete Block Machinery Company of London, Ontario and South Bend, Indiana. The house was described as "An Artistic Bungalow constructed of stucco and concrete block", and a brief description was given that included its dimensions, number of rooms and structural details. It was noted that the house was completed for $6,500. Today it is remodeled beyond recognition.
- 5.) H.S. Crane house. Maher's influence is clearly still evident in the design of this early house.
- 6.) Maurice Kozminski house. Legion of Honour winner Maurice W. Kozminski was a mortgage banker with the Chicago firm Kozminski and Yondorf, and was the General Western Agent for the Compagnie Générale Transatlantique from the age of 23 until 1916 when he was called to New York to assume the position of Director General of Passenger Traffic for the line.

Pictures of the house appeared in Architecture magazine in 1917 and in The Architectural Record in October 1914. Here it was described as follows:

"...These [Midwest country] houses almost uniformly give the impression of being built for people of refinement who take a keen interest in making their homes attractive, and who have to that end sought the advice of competent architects. One of the most attractive of these houses is that of Mr. W. [sic] Kozminski, at Highland Park, Ill. Its architect, Mr. Robert Seyfarth, has charmingly adapted the proportions and lines of an Italian villa to a contemporary American suburban residence; a formal treatment model has been converted into a comparatively informal modern residence, with a large enclosed porch and with none of the landscape gardening which is ordinarily needed to bind the house to the site.".

The image above shows the house as it appeared in the article for The Architectural Record. It has subsequently been demolished.

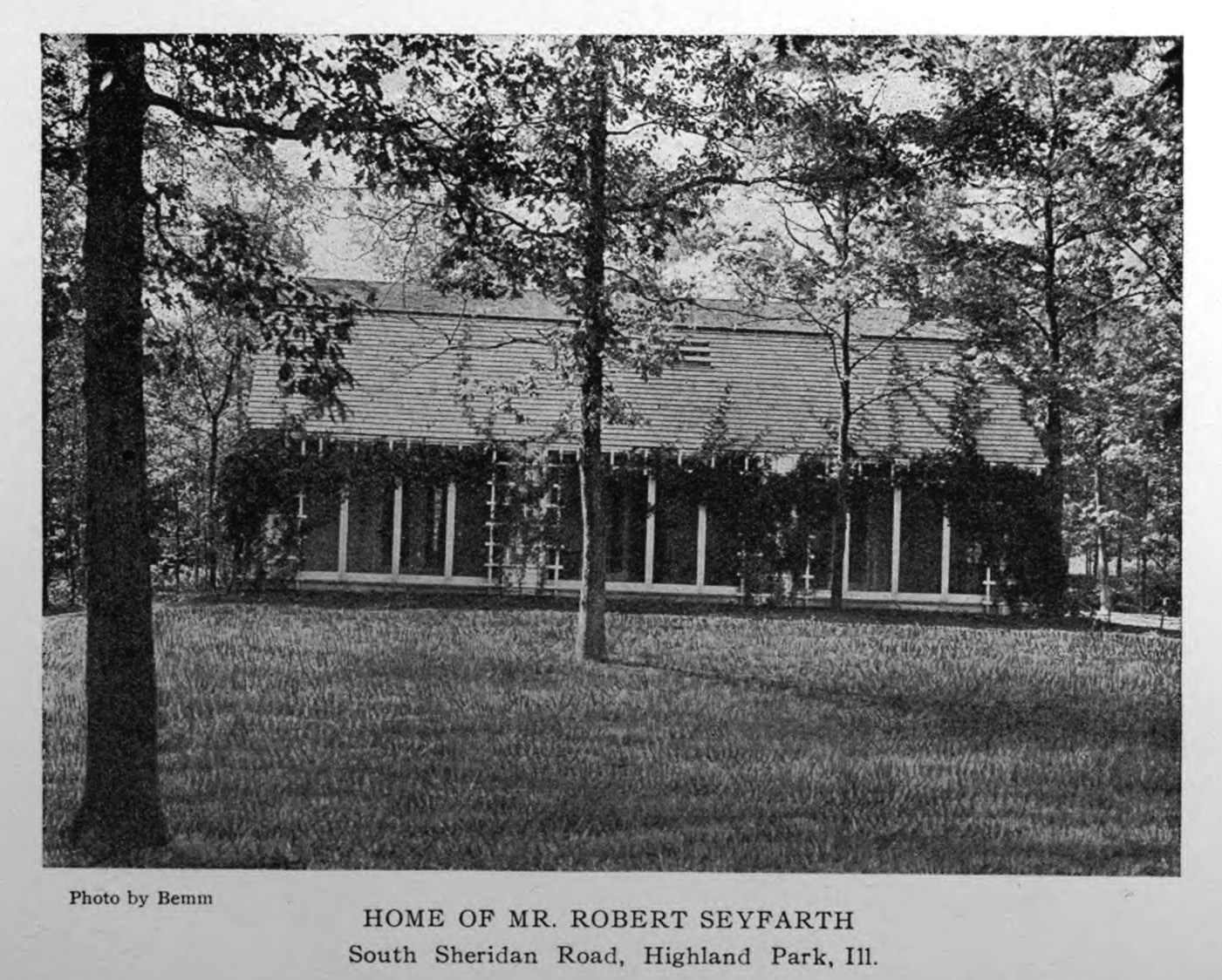
The second Robert Seyfarth house, 542 (now 1498) Sheridan Road, Highland Park, Illinois. 1911

- 7.) The second Robert Seyfarth house. The picture to the left shows the house as it appeared in 1911, before any additions were made to it by Seyfarth or subsequent owners. The picture above shows the house as it appeared in 1981 with changes made by Seyfarth - in 1920 he added the garage and the hyphen in between, and in about 1922 he enclosed the front porch, which runs across the front of the house and is screened in the 1911 photo. With the gambrel roof, wood shingle siding and other elements of traditional design, the house makes a distinct break with the stylistic influence of Maher. Today it has later additions that have been sympathetically designed to respect Seyfarth's original intention.
- 8.) Daniel and Maude Eisendrath house. Daniel Eisendrath was a prominent Chicago surgeon and a professor of surgery at the University of Illinois. He was also a noted writer and the author of two textbooks on clinical anatomy and surgical diagnosis. The house was built in 1904 according to plans created by the architect Henry Leopold Ottenheimer (1868–1919), who early in his career had worked at the office of the celebrated Chicago architectural firm of Adler and Sullivan along with Frank LLoyd Wright. (Ottenheimer's time there may best be remembered by some as having been the person who stabbed Wright in the back with a drafting knife during a scuffle.). After time spent furthering his studies in Paris, Ottenheimer returned to Chicago and established his own practice, which operated under the name of Ottenheimer, Stern & Reichert. It was during that time that he persuaded the young Rudolph Schindler to come from Vienna to work in his office. Seyfarth was called upon by the Eisendraths to submit drawings to renovate the house in 1910, and the building permit for the work was taken out on April 30 of that year.
- 9.) Samuel E. Thomason house. The composition and the stucco finish, casement windows, and tile roof shows that Seyfarth owes a debt of inspiration to Howard Van Doren Shaw for this Arts and Crafts design.
- 10.) Alexander Stewart house. This house is seen by some as being among the architect's finest. With the imaginative use of traditional materials and non-traditional geometry, Seyfarth made the Colonial Revival his own. The house features a modern convenience that was a common feature in Seyfarth's frame houses in this style - the wooden shutters are functional and operate with a crank from the inside of the house.
- 11.) 2064 W. Pratt Blvd. Note the symmetrical pavilions attached to the east and west ends of the house, a device used by Seyfarth a year earlier at the Alexander Stewart house in Highland Park (see gallery picture 10).
- 12.) Lawrence Howe house. Here Seyfarth gives a nod to the New York architectural firm of McKim, Mead & White, and particularly to their forward-thinking early work, namely the Preston Hall Butler house in St. James, New York (by Stanford White, 1878, enlarged c. 1881) and the William Low house in Bristol, Rhode Island (1887, demolished 1962). McKim, Mead & White would soon "abandon simplicity and its hidden potential", but Seyfarth would pay homage to it here and for the rest of his career. The house is shown here as it appeared in February, 1920 issue of The Western Architect magazine.
- 13.) 700 Greenwood Ave. Although not particularly large, this house presents an impressive façade to the street by virtue of its correct proportion, commanding front entrance, slate roof and lack of clutter brought on by extraneous detail that would tend to make the house seem smaller by breaking up its clean geometry. With the use of inverted dormers, Seyfarth is free to locate windows on the second floor without having to give consideration to the protuberances that would result with conventional dormers.
- 17.) The Krueger Funeral Home. In 1913 Seyfarth had designed a house two blocks farther north on Greenwood Avenue for Robert Krueger, whose family had founded the funeral home in 1858. The funeral home was designed to look like a house to blend in with the residential architecture that surrounded it in Blue Island's "silk stocking" district. The Krueger and Seyfarth families were related by marriage. (The building was used inside and out in the 2006 Paramount Pictures film Flags of Our Fathers.)
- 18.) Wagstaff house. In this house Seyfarth shows his affinity for the work of his near-contemporary Howard van Doren Shaw (1869–1926). In its geometry and with Seyfarth's usual simplification of exterior decoration, the house shares a similarity to the Hugh J. McBirney house (1908, 81 W. Laurel, Lake Forest, IL), which "...has more in common with the forms of the hipped roof houses of Wright and the Prairie School". The Wagstaff house also shares the enclosed porches that are an important feature of the McBirney house, and like it "...the house is almost devoid of specific stylistic elements".

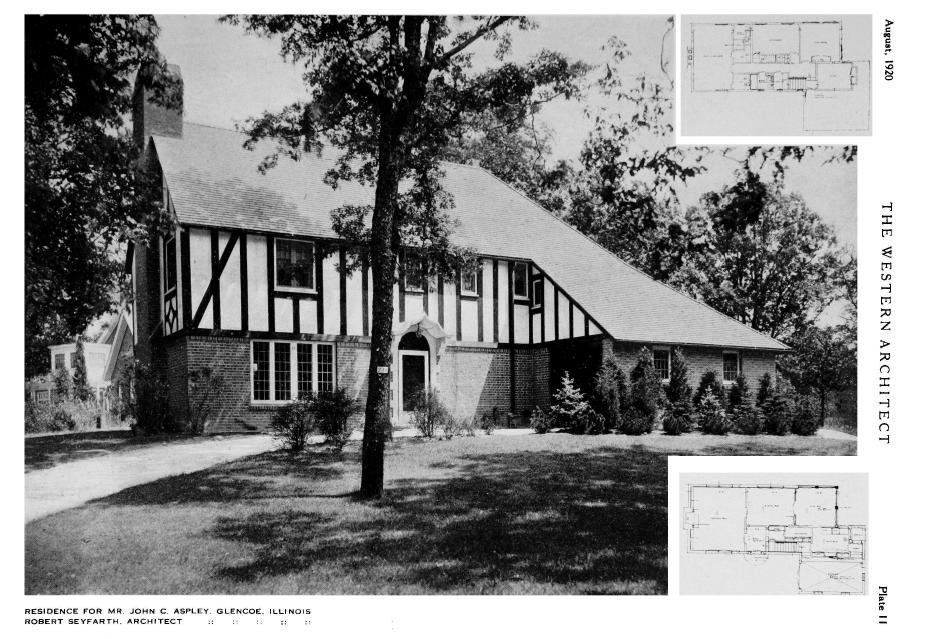
The first John C. Aspley house, 230 Fairview, Glencoe, IL. 1919. Demolished

- 20.) John Cameron Aspley house. Aspley (1888–1969) was the editor of Sales Management Magazine and founder and president of its parent company, Dartnell Corporation of Chicago. In that capacity he was the author of a dozen books on the subject (some of which are still in print). The J.C. Aspley Award and Scholarship, for achievement and excellence in marketing, is named in his honor. He was also active in causes that promoted the public good - for example he served on the Advisory Committee for the College of Commerce and Business Administration at the University of Illinois, and was the chairman of the Wilson Avenue YMCA in Chicago.

Aspley must have been a satisfied client. Seyfarth had designed a house for him at 230 Fairview Road in Glencoe in 1919 that appeared in The Western Architect the following year (see image, left), and an addition to the Dartnell Corporation building at R
avenswood and Leland Avenues in Chicago in 1932.
This house is one of Seyfarth's largest, and sits on a bluff overlooking Lake Michigan. The layout is such that most of the rooms face the lake. The house features the inverted dormer windows that are a hallmark of Seyfarth's work, and lannon-stone walls that are likely the work of Caesar Fiocchi, who was one of a small group of craftsmen that Seyfarth relied upon to interpret his work as he intended. Fiocchi would also have been responsible for the carving over the front door.

- 21.) Arthur Seyfarth house. This house is another one that features operable exterior shutters. Note the original storm windows, which reproduce the pattern of the muntins on the movable double-hung sash. Note, too, how the inverted dormers here help to maintain the simple geometry of the building. To improve the proportions of this house's large living room, Seyfarth raised its ceiling higher than those of any of the other rooms on the first floor. He inserted built-in drawers into the exterior walls of the second-floor bedrooms beneath the roof to utilize what would otherwise be wasted space and so that the need of case pieces for the storage of clothing was virtually eliminated. This convenience was one that had been promoted by Frank Lloyd Wright in an article in The Architectural Record magazine in 1908 "...The most truly satisfactory apartments are those in which most or all of the furniture is built in as part of the original scheme ...".
- 22.) Roscoe Page house. Read Robert Seyfarth by David van Zanten, which originally appeared in the Chicago Architectural Club Journal in 1985, at RobertSeyfarthArchitect.com
- 25.) Russell E. Q. Johnson house Here Seyfarth embraced the ranch style floor plan with his own twist. The house is one of a number of the type that he designed beginning in 1936 (for Dougall Kittermaster at 1415 Waverly Road, Highland Park, demolished), the year before Frank Lloyd Wright drew up the plans for his first Usonian house for Herbert and Katherine Jacobs, which is credited with inspiring the craze for single-level living that lasted for nearly fifty years.

== Demolition and controversy ==
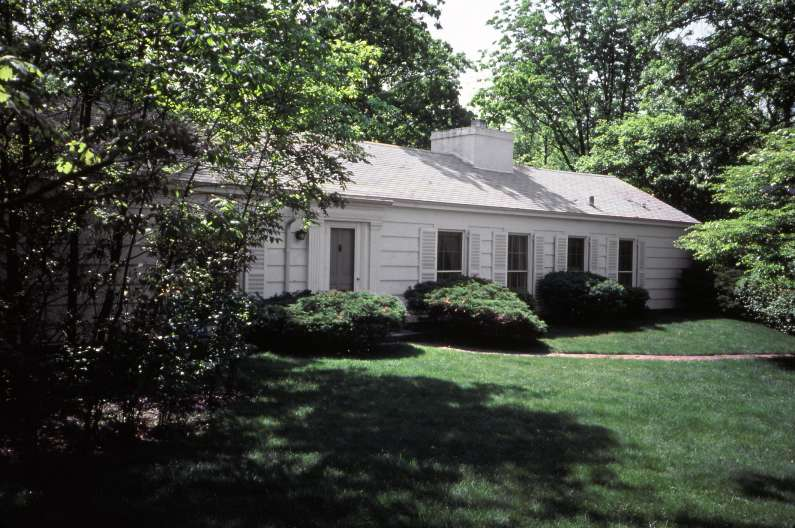
The George Mahler house, Highland Park, Illinois. c. 1942 (demolished)

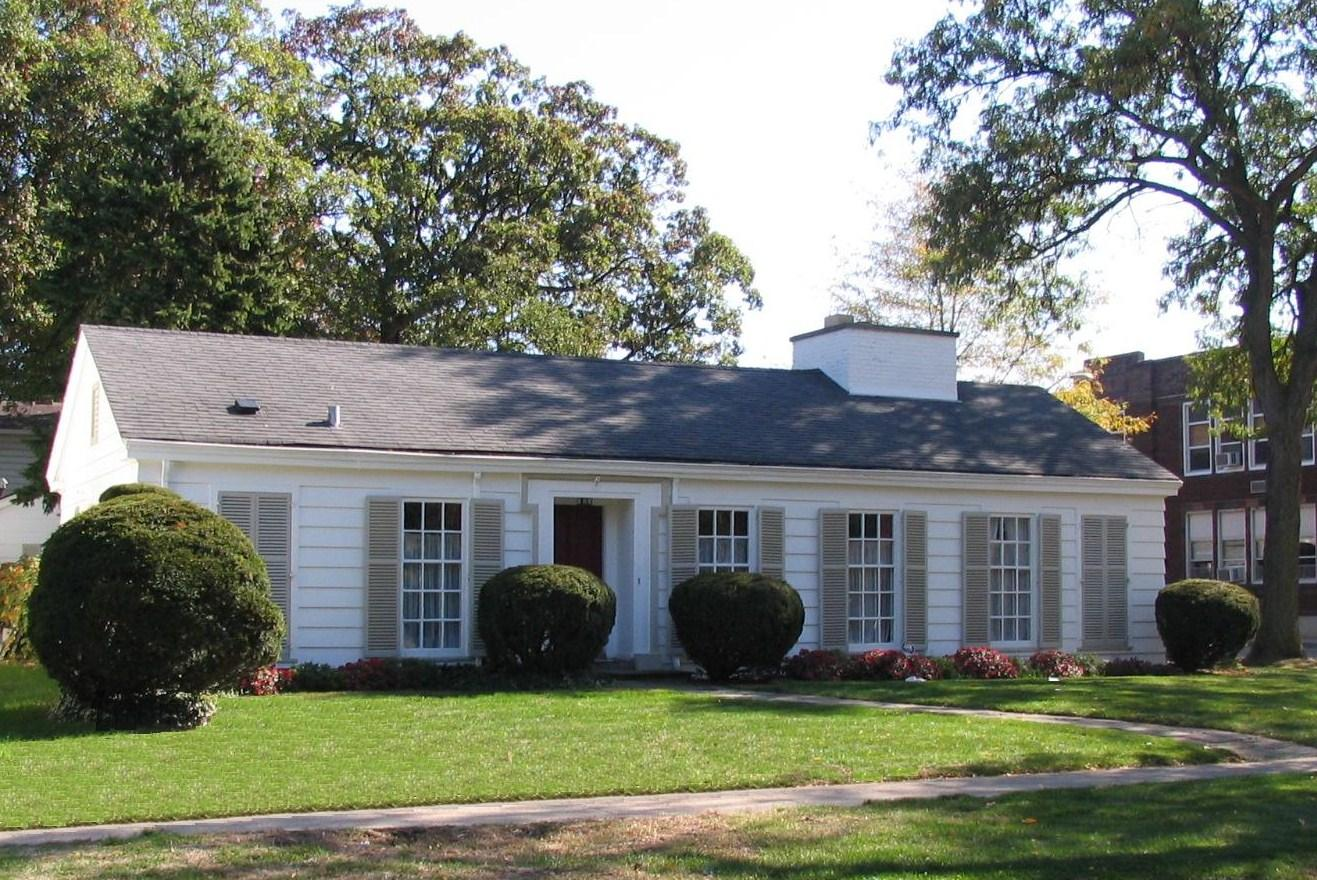
The William Schreiber house, Blue Island, IL. 1950

Not all of Seyfarth's buildings have survived. One house at 67th and Yale was demolished in the late 1960s to make way for the construction of Kennedy–King College. The parking lot for the 6th District (Gresham) police station, built in 1997, occupies the spot where Dr. F.S. Tufts had built a store and offices (at 7754 S. Halsted St.) in 1909. At least one demolished house continues to live on, in a manner of speaking. Although it was a designated local landmark, the George Mahler house at 90 Ridge Road in Highland Park (1942) was demolished and replaced with a larger home, but its virtual twin still stands at 12857 S. Maple Avenue in Blue Island, having been built for William Schrieber in 1950, the year of Robert Seyfarth's passing. Ada Louise Huxtable, the Pulitzer Prize-winning architectural critic for The New York Times, made this classic observation about the phenomenon in a 1968 article she wrote about the demolition of Frank Lloyd Wright's Imperial Hotel (1923–1968) in Tokyo: "There is no art as impermanent as architecture. All that solid brick and stone mean nothing. Concrete is as evanescent as air. The monuments of our civilization stand, usually, on negotiable real estate; their value goes down as land value goes up. ... The logic and mathematics are immutable." Most demolitions of Seyfarth's buildings fall into this category - they're torn down with little fanfare to be replaced by larger homes and buildings.

There is one notable exception. The Hubbard/Brach house, which stood at 595 Sheridan Road in Winnetka, IL, was demolished in 2001 by a developer over the strong objections of local historians and the Landmarks Preservation Council of Illinois. The property had a hat trick in the arsenal for its defense that should have prevented it from being razed, but Winnetka had a weak landmark ordinance that required the owner's consent before a proposed landmark could be designated.
The house sat on a three acre lot overlooking Lake Michigan. It was built c.1854, and in 1871 had become the home of Gilbert Hubbard, a founding father of the town and the developer of a large section of it that today is called Hubbard Woods. The house was sold in 1924 to Edwin Brach (an heir to the Brach's candy fortune), who with his family owned the house until 1999, when it was sold to George Garrick, who had become wealthy as an internet venture capitalist. At the time the Brach family bought it, the house underwent a significant renovation that was designed by Seyfarth, at which time it was extensively remodeled and increased in size to 11 rooms. All of this notwithstanding, Garrick felt the house had no architectural or historic value and his only apparent interest in the property was in the land on which it was located. Shortly after coming into possession of it he requested a demolition permit for the house so that the property could be sub-divided for two new houses. Without a strong preservation ordinance, the village was powerless to stop the demolition, and after fruitless attempts were made to come to some other accommodation the permit was granted and the house was demolished. In the end, Garrick never developed the parcel. The basement of the old house was filled in and the lot was allowed to return to its natural state. He later sold the property for a $500,000 loss and returned to California.

== Salient features ==
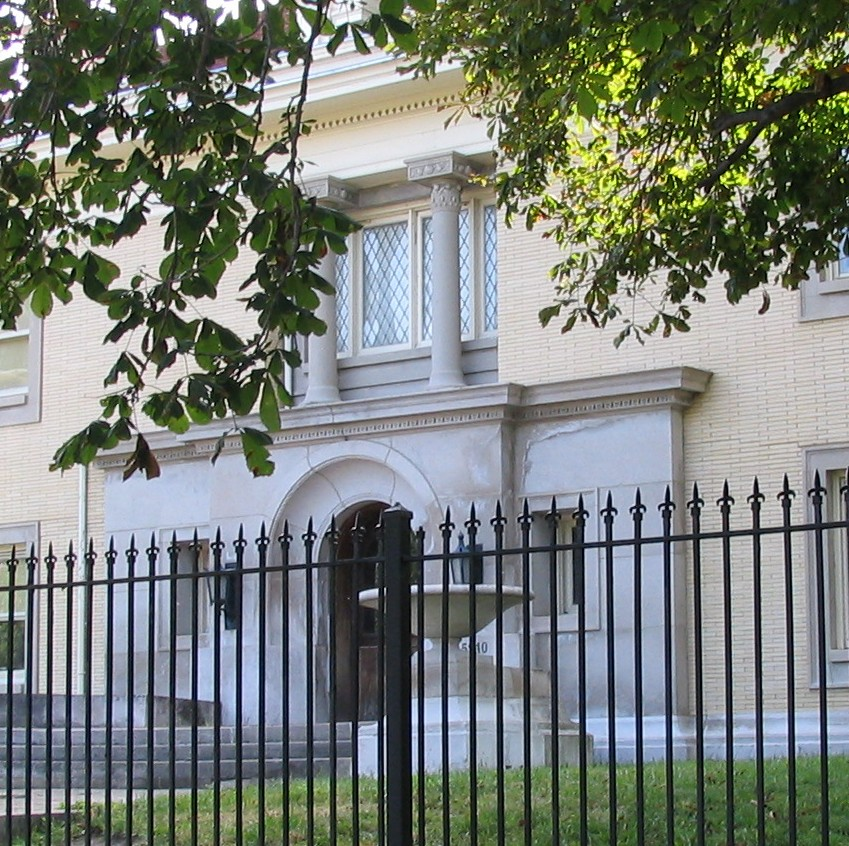
Detail, front doorway of the Alexander and Sarah Colvin House, 5940 N. Sheridan Road, Edgewater, Chicago, IL. George Washington Maher, architect. 1909

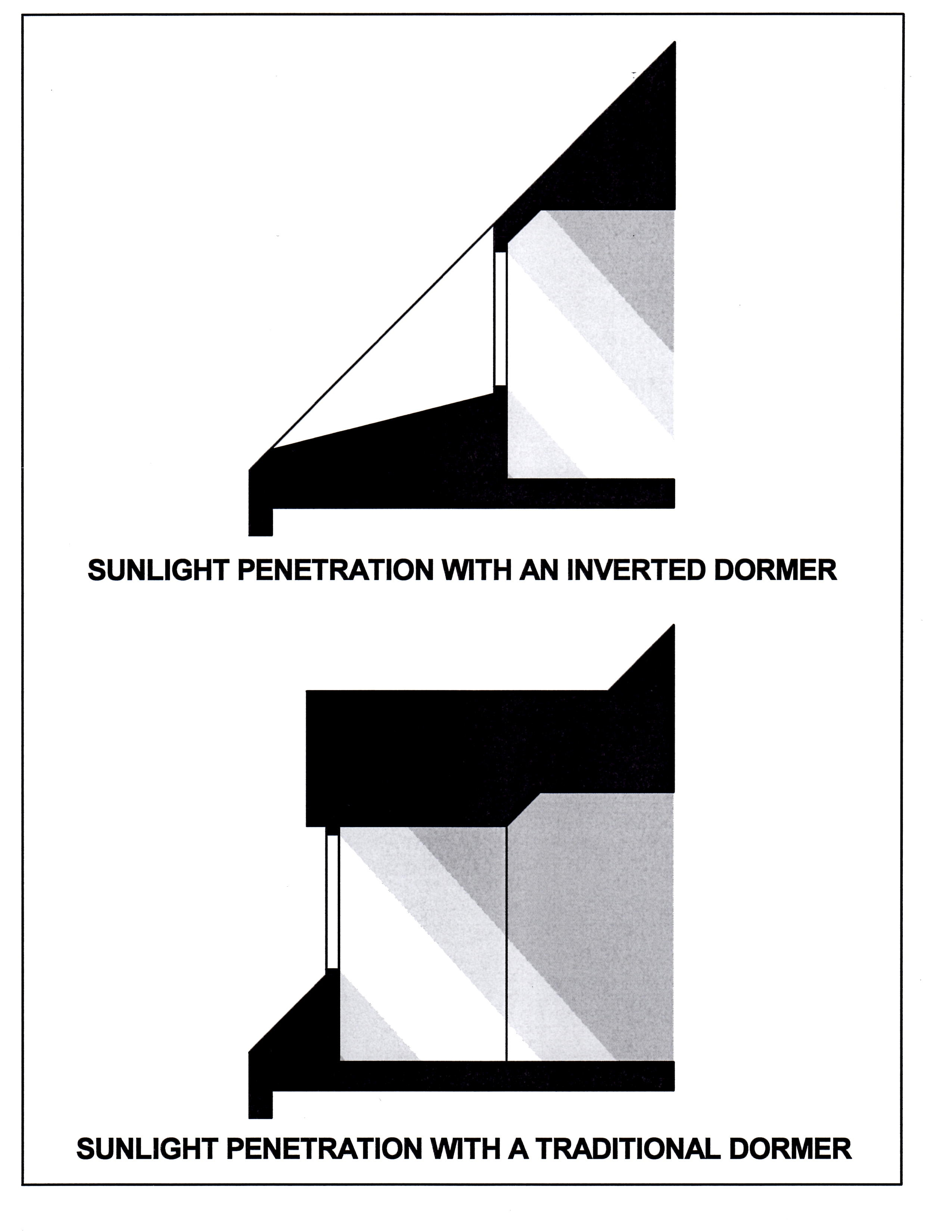
The diagram above illustrates the difference between the amount of sunlight that penetrates into an interior space when an inverted dormer (top) is used compared to the use of a traditional dormer.

Although considered a revivalist architect, Seyfarth's designs were not pedantic copies of existing work or even typical examples of the revival architecture that was popular at the time. Despite the fact that his design aesthetic was more traditional than that of his previous employer, Seyfarth had absorbed many of Maher's (and the Prairie School's) ideas and incorporated them into his own architectural philosophy. His buildings provided their owners with architecture that offered the most up-to-date conveniences and floorplans that were considered modern - but that was carefully imbued with the warmth and character of earlier times. From his introduction to The Home You Longed For -

"These few old world standards, rightly employed, have become completely molded to fit our present conditions so that ... our modern examples are not imitations, but rather developments of early principals ... With such a rich inheritance handed down to us, why should not all our homes be of this sort, examples of these splendid former types which were fashioned on sound principles beyond reason for change of design and possessing an artistic grace from which future generations may gather lasting inspiration - made to live in and adorned to please - such should be the enduring qualities of the typical American home of today."

Here he reiterated the thoughts that the architect and writer John Wellborn Root had expressed in a paper he read to an audience at the Chicago Architectural Sketch Club in 1887 that later appeared in The Inland Architect (February, 1888, pp. 3–5):

"Now, in America, we are free of artistic traditions ... A new spirit of beauty is being developed and perfected, and even now its first achievements are beginning to delight us. This is not the old thing made over; it is new. It springs out of the past, but it is not tied to it; it studies the traditions, but it is not enslaved by them. It is doing original work, and it will do more."

Seyfarth's adaptation of "old world standards" to suit modern taste was done in several ways. First of all, Seyfarth flooded his interiors with natural light. What made this possible in the principal rooms of the first floor were the floor-length windows, which here and elsewhere were frequently wider than what might be acceptable to Palladio, but that were always in proportion to the building of which they were an element. On the upper floors where inverted dormers were used, sunlight is allowed to come directly into the room since the tunnel to the outdoors that is created by the ceiling of a convention dormer and half the area of the cheek walls is virtually eliminated (see image above - the angle of the sunlight as shown here is represented as it would be at the vernal and autumnal equinoxes in Chicago). Elsewhere, bays and banks of windows were frequently included to offer the same benefit.

Another device that was sometimes used quite dramatically by Maher (see image, upper left) that is a signature feature of Seyfarth's work is the embellishment of the front door as the main decorative feature of the house, usually to the exclusion of everything else on the building. This allowed for the buildings' geometry and finish materials to speak for its architectural style, and act as a counterpoint to what was seen, especially then, as the fussiness of the architecture of the previous three quarters of a century. Here he was practicing what Root and Louis Sullivan had preached:

"The value of plain surfaces in every building is not to be overestimated. Strive for them, and when the fates

place at your disposal a good, generous sweep of masonry, accept it frankly and thank God."

– From a paper read by Root before the Chicago Architectural Sketch Club, January 3, 1887 and later published in Inland Architect.

and

"...I take it as self-evident that a building, quite devoid of ornament, may convey a noble and dignified sentiment by virtue of mass and proportion. It is not evident to me that ornament can intrinsically heighten these elemental qualities. Why, then, should we use ornament? Is not a noble and simple dignity sufficient? ... I should say that it would be greatly for our esthetic good if we should refrain entirely from the use of ornament for a period of years, in order that our thought might concentrate acutely upon the production of buildings well-formed and comely in the nude ... This step taken, we might safely inquire to what extent a decorative application of ornament would enhance the beauty of structures - what new charm it would give them ... We shall have learned, ... that ornament is mentally a luxury, not a necessary, for we shall have discerned the limitations as well as the great value of unadorned masses."
– From an article by Sullivan entitled "Ornament in Architecture" published in Engineering Magazine in 1892.

Having worked in the frequently austere style of Maher for a "period of years", Seyfarth was ready to work with traditionally inspired ornament, judiciously applied.

And as stylistically different as Seyfarth's work is from the work of Frank Lloyd Wright, Seyfarth embraced Wright's feeling that

"...We no longer have an outside and an inside as two separate things. Now the outside may come inside and the inside may and does go outside. They are of each other."

Seyfarth frequently designed outdoor living space that was under the protective roof of the house but exposed its occupants to the benefits of fresh air and sunlight (see gallery images 1, 2, 3, 4, 5, 6, 7, 9, 10, 11, 12, 14, 16, 18, 19, 20, 21 and 24, although some have been subsequently enclosed.) And the centrally located fireplaces that Wright espoused, along with their prominent chimneys, were to become a major feature of Seyfarth's work.

One feature of the current age, the ubiquitous attached garage (the successful inclusion of which apparently continues to confound architects today), was frequently incorporated into the design of the main house with such skill one observer noted that "...Norman peasants must have been driving automobiles since the Conquest."

== Significant works ==
- Design for built-in cabinets and fireplace for the gallery of the Samuel Nickerson house, Chicago (Burling & Whitehouse, 1883), for Lucius Fisher,1900-1901 - (extant).
- The original Patten Gymnasium, Northwestern University, 1909 - demolished 1940, Evanston, Illinois

(The first two as an assistant to George Maher).

- The Florentine Room at the Congress Plaza Hotel, 1909, Chicago (see image above) - (extant).
- Recital Hall and showrooms for the Baldwin Piano Co., 264 (later 323 S.) Wabash Ave., 1910, Chicago - demolished.
- State Bank of West Pullman, 1910, 622 W. 120th St., West Pullman, Chicago - (extant).
- Enquirer Building for C.W. Post, 1915, 7 N. McCamly St., Grand Rapids, MI - demolished c.1930
- Renovation of the residence of Henry Biroth for Harry and Stella Biroth Massey, 1912, 130 (now 2601) Vermont St., Blue Island, IL. After 1924 Hallinan Funeral Home (extant, with later additions).
- First Methodist Church, 1918, Geneseo, Illinois - (extant).
- Clubhouse, South Side Country Club (now South Bluff Country Club), 1919, Peru, Illinois - (extant).
- West Ridge School addition, 1926, Highland Park, Illinois - (extant)
- Samuel Holmes House, 1926, Highland Park, IL, with Jens Jensen, landscape architect. - (extant).
- Krueger Funeral Home, 1927, Blue Island, Illinois - (extant).
