= Capon (disambiguation) =

A capon is a cockerel whose reproductive organs were removed at an early age.

Capon may also refer to:

- Capon (surname)
- Capon Chapel, a landmark in West Virginia

== See also ==
- Capon Bridge
- Capon Lake, West Virginia
- Capon Springs, West Virginia
- Capon Springs Run
- Capon Oak Tree
- Kapon
