= Capon Springs Station, West Virginia =

Unincorporated community in West Virginia, United States

Capon Springs Station
- Unincorporated community
- Location within the state of West Virginia Capon Springs Station (West Virginia) Capon Springs Station (the United States)
- Coordinates: 39°9′4″N 78°31′9″W
- Country: United States
- State: West Virginia
- County: Hampshire
- Time zone: UTC-5 (Eastern (EST))
  - Summer (DST): UTC-4 (EDT)
- GNIS feature ID: 1556748

Capon Springs Station was an unincorporated community hamlet in Hampshire County in the U.S. state of West Virginia centered on a station on the Winchester and Western Railroad. Located along Capon Springs Road (West Virginia Secondary Route 16) where Dry Run meets Capon Springs Run on the western end of Middle Ridge, Capon Springs Station served as a stop for guests at the Capon Springs Resort in Capon Springs and people picnicking at Capon Lake on the Cacapon River.
