= Capon Lake Whipple Truss Bridge =

Bridge in West Virginia

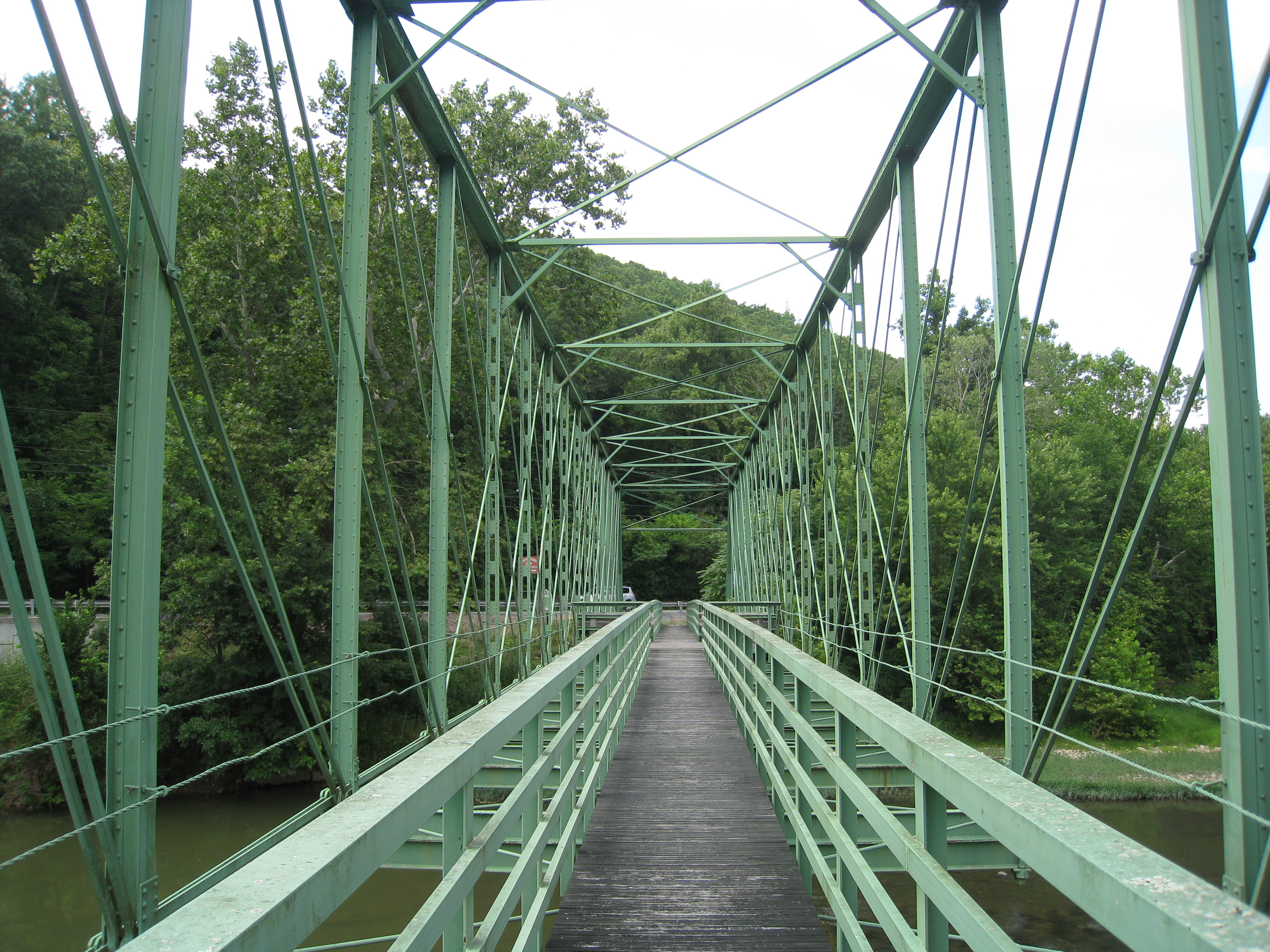
- Capon Lake Whipple Truss Bridge, looking northwest from its southeast end, in 2009
- Coordinates: 39°09′30″N 78°32′7″W
- Carries: US 50 (1874–1937); CR 16 (1938–1991)
- Crosses: South Branch; Potomac River (1874–1937); Cacapon River (1938–present)
- Locale: Hampshire, West Virginia, United States
- Official name: Capon Lake Whipple Truss Bridge
- Other name(s): South Branch Bridge, Romney Bridge
- Named for: Capon Lake
- Maintained by: West Virginia Division of Highways, District 5
- NRHP #: 11000929

Characteristics
- Design: National Register of Historic Places
- Total length: 176 ft (54 m)
- Width: 20 ft (6.1 m)
- Height: 23 ft (7.0 m)

History
- Constructed by: T. B. White and Sons
- Built: 1874
- Rebuilt: 1938
- Capon Lake Whipple Truss Bridge
- U.S. National Register of Historic Places
- NRHP reference No.: 11000929
- Added to NRHP: December 15, 2011

Location
- Interactive map of Capon Lake Whipple Truss Bridge

The Capon Lake Whipple Truss Bridge (locally /ˈkeɪpən/), formerly known as South Branch Bridge or Romney Bridge, is a historic Whipple truss bridge in Capon Lake, West Virginia, United States. It is located off Carpers Pike (West Virginia Route 259) and crosses the Cacapon River. The bridge formerly carried Capon Springs Road (County Route 16) over the river, connecting Capon Springs and Capon Lake.

The bridge's Whipple truss technology was developed by civil engineer Squire Whipple in 1847. J. W. Murphy further modified Whipple's truss design in 1859 by designing the first truss bridge with pinned eyebar connections. The design of the Capon Lake Whipple Truss Bridge incorporates Murphy's later modifications with double-intersections and horizontal chords, and is therefore considered a Whipple–Murphy truss bridge. The Capon Lake Whipple Truss Bridge is West Virginia's oldest remaining example of a Whipple truss bridge and its oldest extant metal truss bridge.

The Capon Lake Whipple Truss Bridge was originally constructed in 1874 as part of the South Branch Bridge (or alternatively, the Romney Bridge), a larger two-span Whipple truss bridge conveying the Northwestern Turnpike (U.S. Route 50) across the South Branch Potomac River near Romney. The larger Whipple truss bridge replaced an 1838 wooden covered bridge that was destroyed during the American Civil War. In 1874, T. B. White and Sons were charged with the construction of a Whipple truss bridge over the South Branch; that bridge served travelers along the Northwestern Turnpike for 63 years until a new bridge was constructed in 1937.

Dismantled in 1937, the bridge was relocated to Capon Lake in southeastern Hampshire County to carry Capon Springs Road (County Route 16) between West Virginia Route 259 and Capon Springs. The bridge was dedicated on August 20, 1938. In 1991, a new bridge was completed to the south, and the Capon Lake Whipple Truss Bridge was preserved in place by the West Virginia Division of Highways, due to its rarity, age, and engineering significance. The Capon Lake Whipple Truss Bridge was listed on the National Register of Historic Places on December 15, 2011.

== Geography and setting ==
The Capon Lake Whipple Truss Bridge is located in a predominantly rural agricultural and forested area of southeastern Hampshire County within the Cacapon River valley. Baker Mountain, a forested narrow anticlinal mountain ridge, rises to the immediate west, and the western rolling foothills of the anticlinal Great North Mountain rise to the bridge's east. The confluence of Capon Springs Run with the Cacapon River lies just north (downstream) of the bridge. George Washington National Forest is located to the bridge's southeast, covering the forested area south of Capon Springs Road.

The bridge is located along Carpers Pike (West Virginia Route 259) in the unincorporated community of Capon Lake, 2.05 miles (3.30 km) southwest of Yellow Spring and 6.77 miles (10.90 km) northeast of the town of Wardensville. The historic Capon Springs Resort and the unincorporated community of Capon Springs are located 3.5 miles (5.6 km) east of Capon Lake on Capon Springs Road (West Virginia Secondary Route 16). The bridge is located immediately north (downstream) of the intersection of Carpers Pike with Capon Springs Road, which is carried across the Cacapon River via the current Capon Lake Bridge, a Girder bridge built in 1991 to replace the Whipple truss bridge for conveying vehicle traffic. The property containing the Capon Lake Whipple Truss Bridge is less than 1 acre (0.40 ha) in size.

== Architecture ==
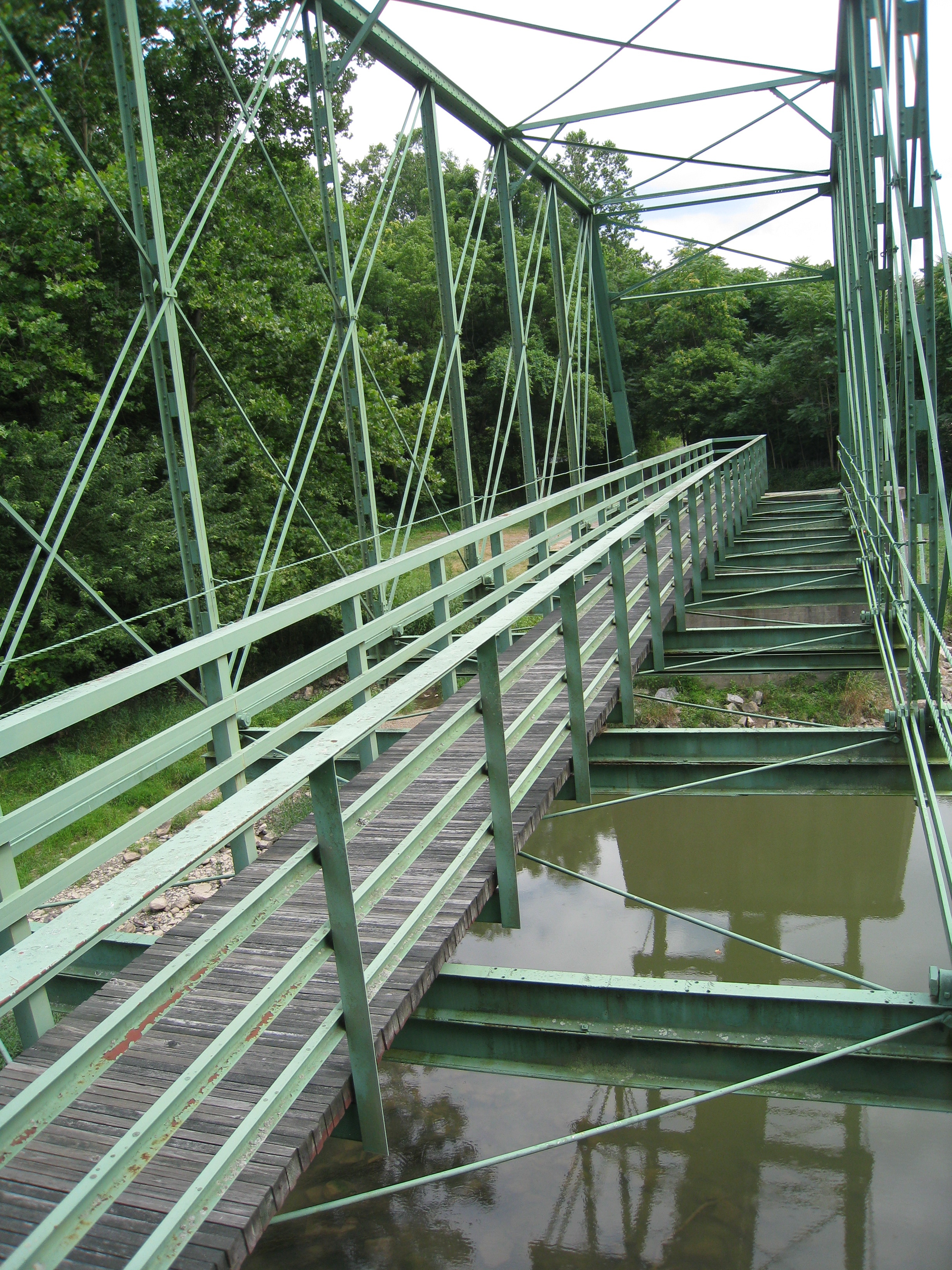
Wooden pedestrian walkway added to the bridge in 1991

The Capon Lake Whipple Truss Bridge is an early example of the use of metal truss bridge load-bearing superstructure technology, which defined highway bridge design well into the 20th century. Because of "its uncommon innovative design and age", the bridge is one of West Virginia's most historically significant bridges. It is the oldest remaining example of a Whipple truss bridge in West Virginia, and the oldest extant metal truss bridge in the state. The metal truss technology of the bridge displays distinctive innovations developed by the prominent civil engineers and bridge designers Squire Whipple and J. W. Murphy; the innovations are evident in the bridge's double-intersection diagonals and counter-diagonals with pin connections.

Approximately 20 feet (6.1 m) in width and 176 feet (54 m) in length, the bridge is built atop a reinforced concrete abutment and pier. Its truss structure exhibits a double-intersection configuration, constructed of 14 bays, each measuring approximately 11 feet (3.4 m) wide and 23 feet (7.0 m) in height, with the diagonals extending across two bays each. The bridge is fabricated of wrought iron bracketed with pins. Spanning the full length of the bridge is a wooden pedestrian walkway that consists of an observation deck and wooden seating near the bridge's midspan.

== History ==
=== Whipple truss development ===
The bridge's Whipple truss technology was developed in 1847 by civil engineer Squire Whipple, who received a patent from the U.S. Patent Office the same year. Whipple was one of the first structural engineers to use scientific and mathematical methods analyzing the forces and stresses in framed structures to design the bridge, and his groundbreaking 1847 book, A Work on Bridge Building, had a significant influence on bridge engineering. Whipple's truss bridge design incorporated double-intersection diagonals into the standard Pratt truss, thus allowing the diagonals to extend across two truss bays. Engineer J. W. Murphy further modified Whipple's truss design in 1859 when he designed the first truss bridge with pinned eyebar connections, which utilized pins instead of trunnions. Murphy's design removed the need for riveted connections and allowed for easier and more widespread construction of truss bridges. In 1863, Murphy designed the first pin-connected truss bridge with both wrought iron tension and compression components and cast iron joint blocks and pedestals. Murphy's truss design consisted of double-intersection counter-diagonals, and along with the eyebar and pin connections, permitted longer iron bridge spans.

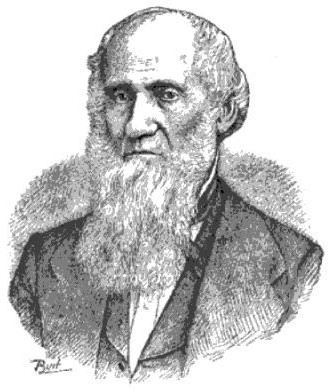
Squire Whipple

The technological design advances made by Whipple and Murphy, in addition to further advances in steel and iron fabrication, made wrought iron truss bridges a major industry in the United States. The Capon Lake bridge was a Whipple–Murphy truss bridge, since it incorporated Murphy's later modifications with double-intersections and horizontal chords. At the time of the bridge's original fabrication in 1874, metal truss bridges were ordered from catalogs by county courts and other entities responsible for transportation construction and maintenance. These entities provided the desired width, length, and other specifications, and the truss materials were shipped to the construction site and assembled by local construction teams. Metal truss bridges were more economically feasible, could span longer distances, and were simpler to construct than stone bridges, and they were more durable than wooden bridges. They were also marketed as detachable and transportable structures that could be dismantled and reassembled. The technology used in the Capon Lake Whipple Truss Bridge revolutionized transport throughout West Virginia. While the Whipple truss bridge had waned in popularity by the 1890s, the bridges were commonly disassembled and re-erected for use on secondary roads, as was the case with the Capon Lake Whipple Truss Bridge in 1938.

=== T. B. White and Sons ===
The construction company that built the Capon Lake Whipple Truss Bridge, T. B. White and Sons, was established in 1868. Its founder Timothy B. White had been a carpenter and contractor in New Brighton, Pennsylvania since the 1840s. White also operated factories for iron cars and woolen mill machinery until 1859, when he began to concentrate solely on bridge construction. White's bridge company operated from a factory on the Beaver River in New Brighton until the factory was destroyed by fire in 1878. After the fire, the company relocated across the river to Beaver Falls and restructured as the Penn Bridge and Machine Works. In addition to iron truss bridges, the company produced a range of structural and architectural components and continued to expand; it employed over 500 workers by 1908. Penn Bridge and Machine Works fended off purchase by the American Bridge Company and continued to operate independently, unlike similar small bridge companies founded in the 19th century. The most prolific of its kind in the Pittsburgh region, the company was responsible for the construction of bridges throughout the United States.

=== South Branch Bridge ===
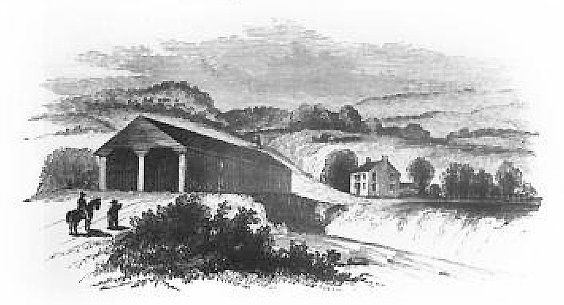
The 1838 covered bridge over the South Branch Potomac River destroyed during the American Civil War, looking east toward Sycamore Dale

The Capon Lake Whipple Truss Bridge was originally constructed in 1874 as part of the South Branch Bridge (or the Romney Bridge), a larger two-span Whipple truss bridge conveying the Northwestern Turnpike (U.S. Route 50) across the South Branch Potomac River 0.57 miles (0.92 km) west of Romney. The 1874 Whipple truss bridge across the South Branch replaced an 1838 wooden covered bridge that had been chartered by the Virginia General Assembly during the construction of the Northwestern Turnpike. Before the construction of the covered bridge in 1838, a public ferry conveyed traffic across the river. Isaac Parsons (1752–1796) operated a ferry there following its establishment by an act of the Virginia General Assembly in October 1786. The 1838 covered bridge remained in use until it was destroyed by retreating Confederate forces during the American Civil War. Throughout the course of the war, Romney reportedly changed hands 56 times between Confederate and Union forces, and the crossing of the South Branch Potomac River served as a strategic point due to its position along the Northwestern Turnpike, an important east–west route.

Following the conclusion of the war, nearly all bridges along the Northwestern Turnpike had been destroyed, including the South Branch Bridge. In order to restore local businesses and industry, Hampshire County citizens called a meeting and steps were taken at the local level to proceed with the construction of new bridges. Local citizens and the South Branch Intelligencer newspaper of Romney campaigned for the immediate replacement of the bridge because of "continual risk, danger and inconveniences arising from want of the South Branch Bridge at Col. Gibson's (destroyed during the war)...". Hampshire County began issuing bonds for the construction of a new bridge over the South Branch in 1868, and by 1874, construction of the Whipple truss bridge had commenced. T. B. White and Sons were charged with the bridge's construction.

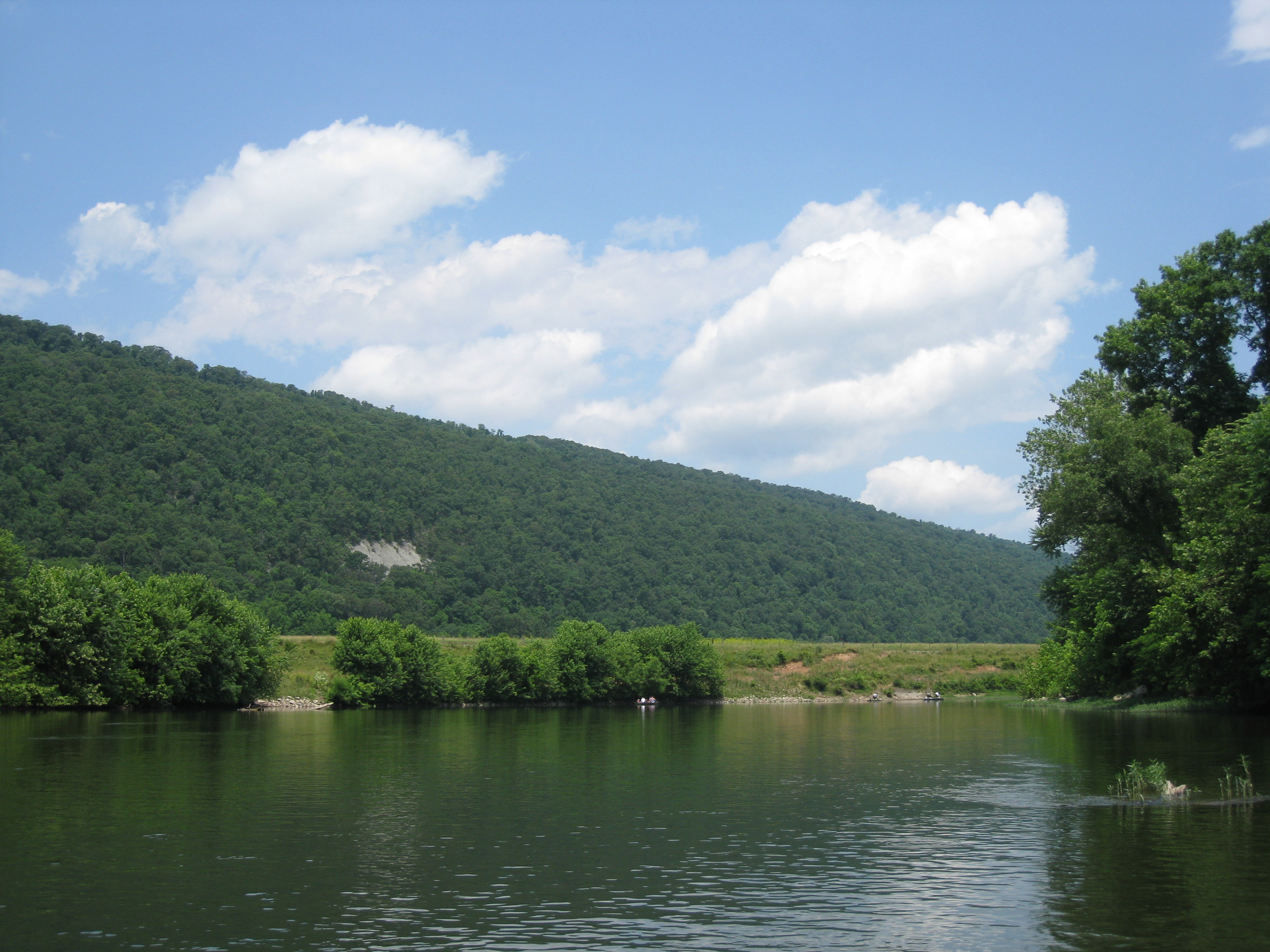
The South Branch Potomac River looking north in 2008, downstream from the present-day South Branch Bridge

The South Branch Intelligencer published periodic updates on the progress of the South Branch Bridge's construction. According to the newspaper, the bridge was scheduled to be completed by July 1875. During the course of construction, John Ridenour lost a finger while working on the bridge. The new South Branch Bridge was completed well ahead of schedule in October 1874. The October 12, 1874, edition of the South Branch Intelligencer characterized the new bridge as a "complete, handsome and durable structure", and further recounted that "the contractors, Messrs. White & Sons, New Brighton, Pennsylvania 'Penn Bridge & Machine Works,' have given us, in general opinion, a first rate, durable work, and deserve our best commendations.... We are confident that ours will realize a very handsome income and fully vindicate the wisdom of the County Court in voting its construction."

Following its construction in 1874, the Whipple truss bridge over the South Branch Potomac River served Romney and travelers along the Northwestern Turnpike for 63 years. In 1935, the West Virginia State Road Commission began organizing a project to replace the Whipple truss bridge, and construction of the new bridge had begun by 1936. In November of that year, a car collided with the south side of the eastern Whipple truss span, which knocked the span completely off its eastern abutment. The car plunged into the South Branch Potomac River, followed by the compromised truss span, which collapsed on top of the car. Unaware of the span's collapse, a car traveling from the west drove off the end of the west span at the bridge's center pier, and fell onto the collapsed span. According to the Hampshire Review, the only serious injury sustained was a broken wooden leg. Following the collapse of the eastern Whipple truss span, a temporary wooden span was hastily constructed between the western truss span and the eastern abutment, so that traffic was uninterrupted until the new bridge was completed and opened on June 21, 1937. The 1937 bridge was used until 2010 when it was replaced by the current South Branch Bridge.

=== Capon Lake Bridge ===
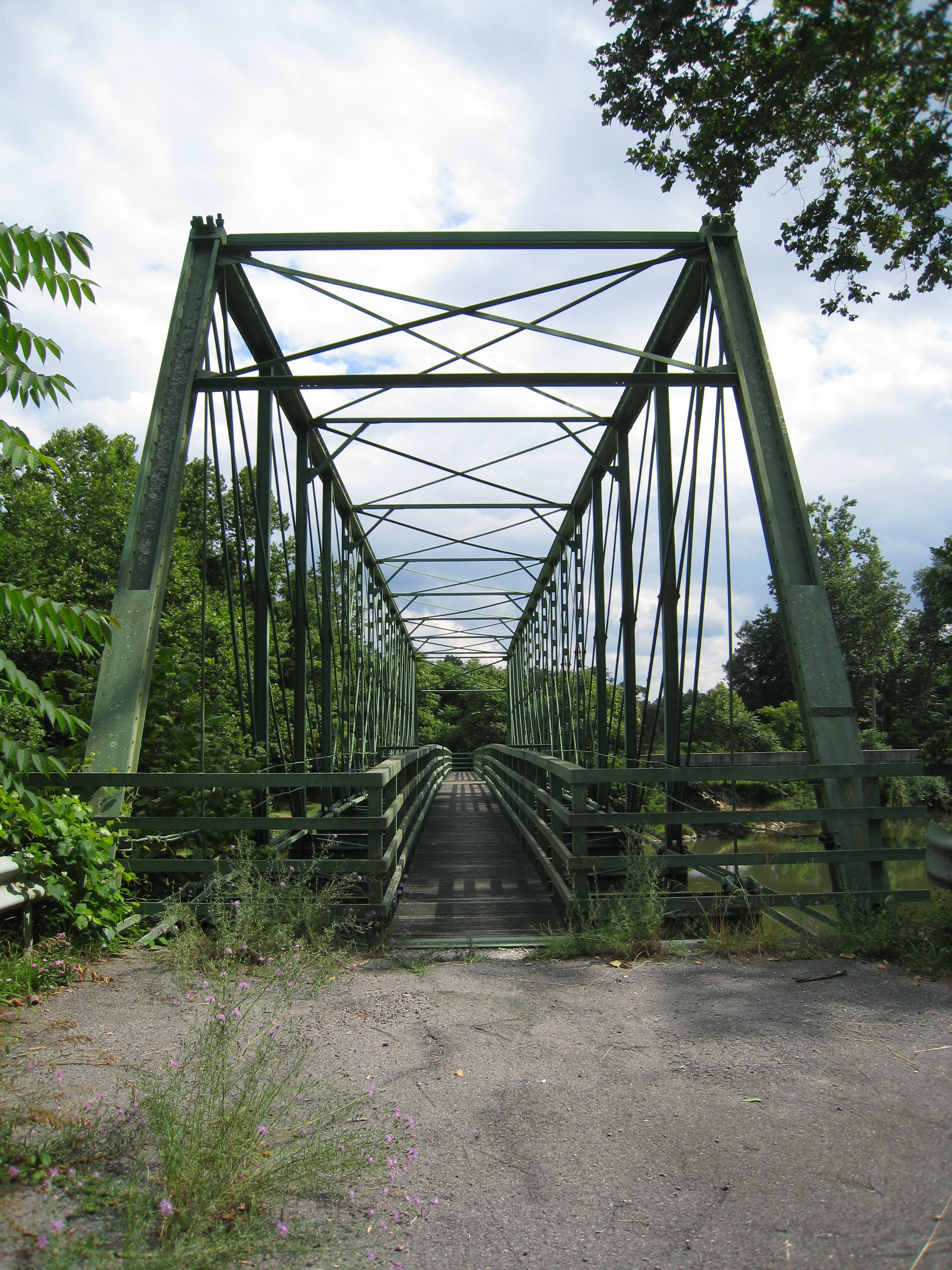
The bridge in 2009, looking southeast from Carpers Pike (West Virginia Route 259)

Because Whipple truss bridges were easily disassembled and re-erected, the remaining western span of the Whipple truss over the South Branch was dismantled in 1937 and relocated to Capon Lake in southeastern Hampshire County to convey Capon Springs Road (West Virginia Secondary Route 16) between West Virginia Route 259 and Capon Springs. According to Branson Himelwright, a Capon Springs resident who had been a construction worker involved in the re-erection of the Whipple truss span at Capon Lake, the only two ways to cross the Cacapon River to reach Capon Springs were to cross a swinging footbridge or ford the river. During the bridge's construction, a new pier and abutments were constructed to carry the Whipple truss span and a connected Pratt truss that had been salvaged from an unknown bridge. Himelwright and Jacob "Moss" Rudolph, who had also participated in the bridge's construction, stated in interviews that both the site excavation and concrete work for the pier and abutments were completed by hand.

The newly erected Capon Lake Bridge was dedicated on August 20, 1938, with a ceremony including musical performances by the Romney High School and Capon Springs Resort bands. Former West Virginia Governor and Capon Springs native Herman G. Kump, West Virginia State Road Commission Secretary Cy Hammill, and numerous other state officials were in attendance at the dedication.

In 1991, the new steel stringer Capon Lake Bridge was constructed 187 feet (57 m) to the southwest of the Capon Lake Whipple Truss Bridge, after which the Whipple truss bridge was closed to vehicle traffic. Due to its rarity, age, and engineering significance, West Virginia Division of Highways District 5 decided to preserve the Whipple truss bridge. During the bridge's restoration, the Pratt truss span was removed due to significant deterioration, and the roadway deck was also removed. A wooden pedestrian walkway and observation deck were constructed across the full span of the remaining truss bridge.

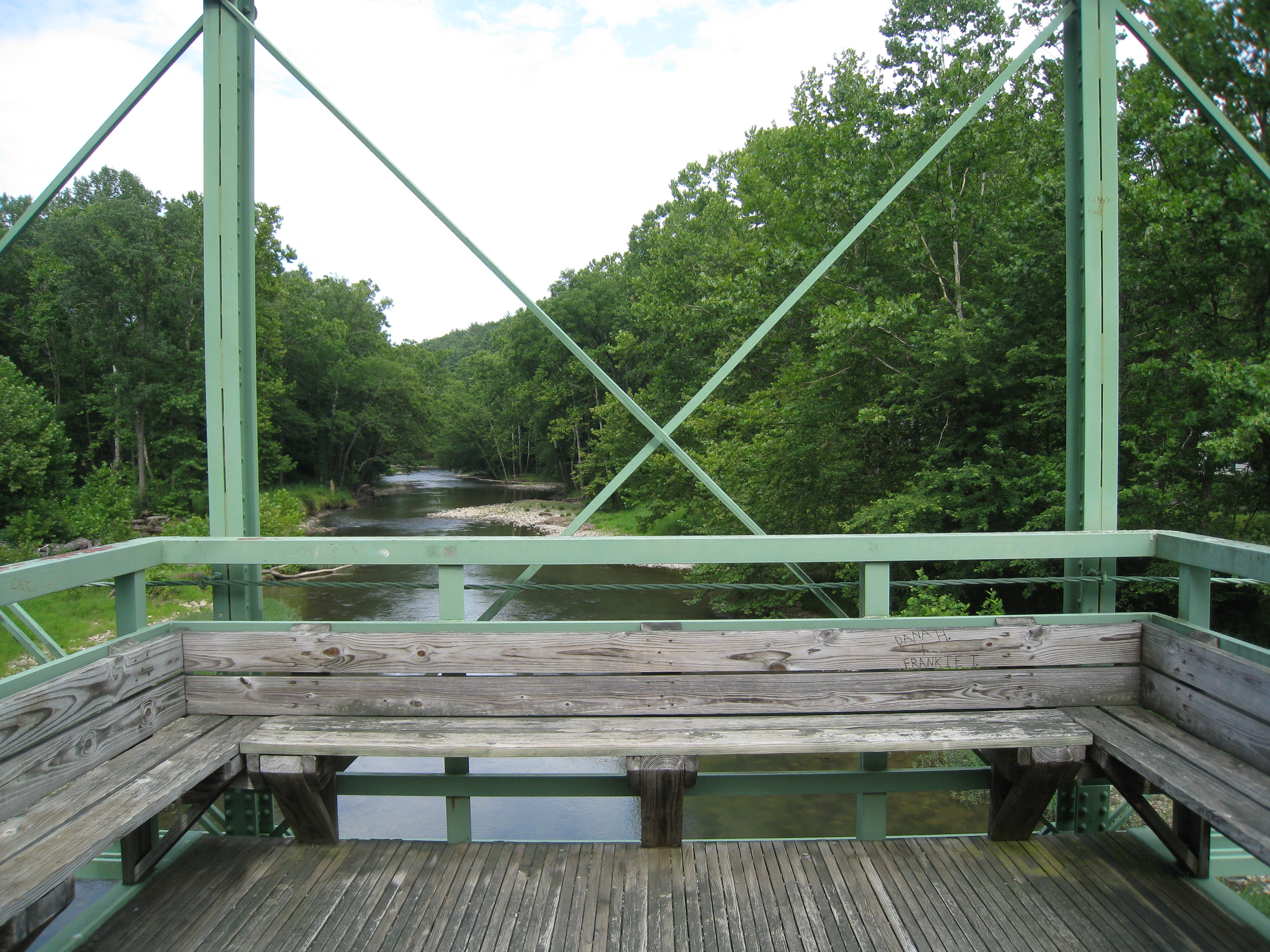
Wooden observation deck looking downstream (north) on the Cacapon River, 2009

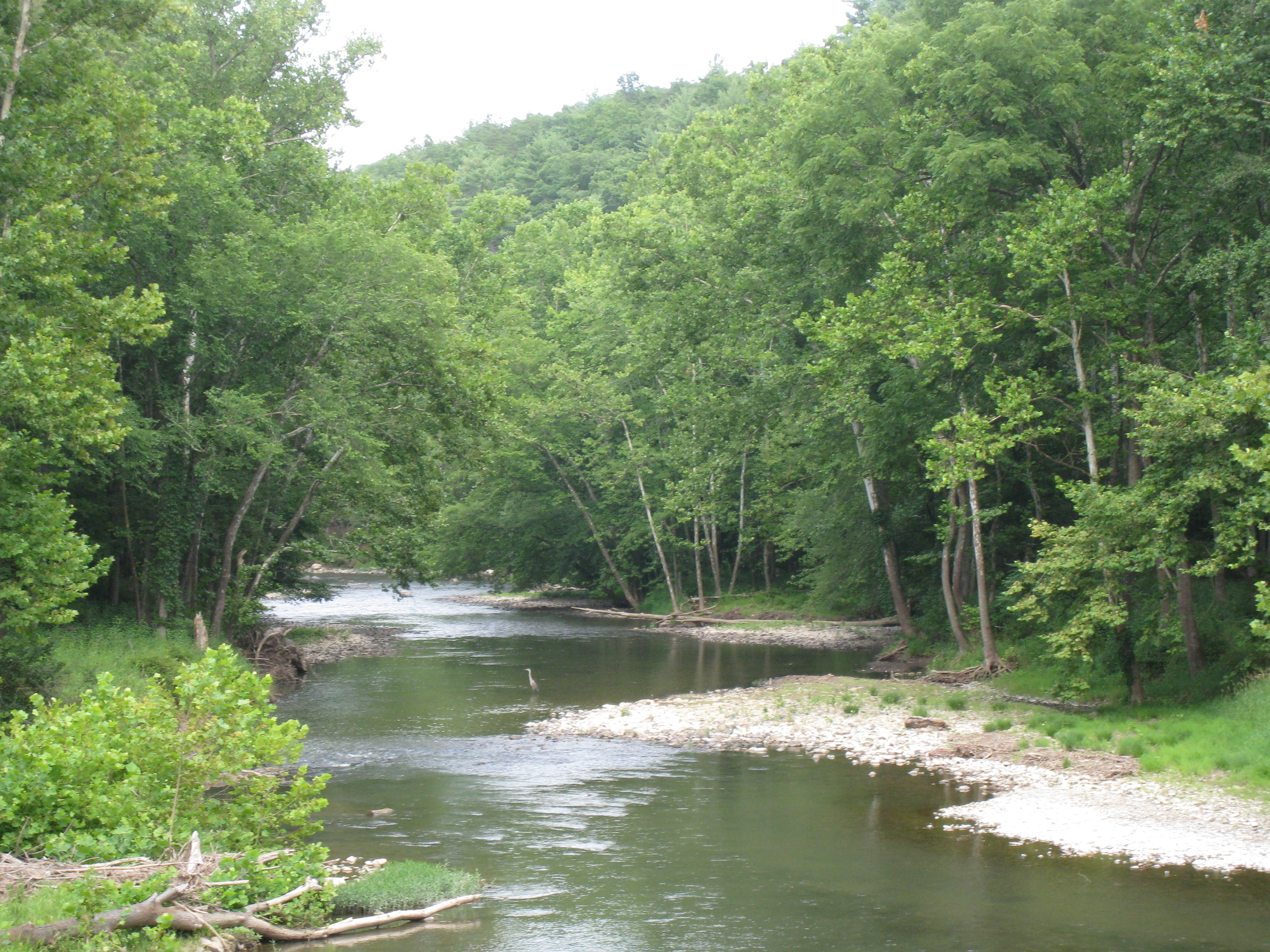
Cacapon River, looking downstream from the bridge in 2009

The Capon Lake Whipple Truss Bridge was listed on the National Register of Historic Places on December 15, 2011, for its "engineering significance as an excellent example of a Whipple/Murphy Truss bridge." Since its listing, the bridge has been maintained as a historic site for pedestrians by the West Virginia Division of Highways District 5. In 2012, the West Virginia Division of Highways, in association with the West Virginia Archives and the history department of the West Virginia Division of Culture and History, installed a historical marker at the northwestern entry to the bridge as part of the West Virginia Highway Historical Marker Program. The marker reads:

First erected in 1874 as a two span bridge on US 50 near Romney, one span was moved here in 1938 and re-erected on a new foundation. The 17' wide by 176' long bridge is a Whipple–Murphy Truss. The state's oldest extant metal truss, the bridge is one of a few of its type in WV. Listed in the National Register of Historic Places in 2011.

== See also ==
- List of historic sites in Hampshire County, West Virginia
- National Register of Historic Places listings in Hampshire County, West Virginia
- Hayden Bridge (Springfield, Oregon) – another example of a notable Whipple-Murphy truss bridge

== Bibliography ==
- Federal Writers' Project (1937). Historic Romney 1762–1937. Romney, West Virginia: Federal Writers' Project, The Town Council of Romney, West Virginia. OCLC 2006735.
- Fint, Courtney (August 3, 2011). National Register of Historic Places Registration Form: South Branch Bridge (PDF). United States Department of the Interior, National Park Service. Archived from the original (PDF) on February 1, 2014.
- Fischetti, David C. (2009). Structural Investigation of Historic Buildings: A Case Study Guide to Preservation Technology for Buildings, Bridges, Towers and Mills. Hoboken, New Jersey: John Wiley & Sons. ISBN 978-0-470-18967-2. OCLC 233544924. Archived from the original on April 6, 2016 – via Google Books.
- Hening, William Waller (1823). The Statutes at Large: Being a Collection of All the Laws of Virginia, from the First Session of the Legislature in the Year 1619: Published Pursuant to an Act of the General Assembly of Virginia, Passed on the Fifth Day of February One Thousand Eight Hundred and Eight, Volume 12. New York City: R. & W. & G. Bartow. OCLC 16810101. Archived from the original on June 24, 2016 – via Google Books.
- Johnson, John Butler; Bryan, Charles Walter; Turneaure, Frederick Eugene; Kinne, William Spaulding (1910). The Theory and Practice of Modern Framed Structures: Designed for the Use of Schools and for Engineers in Professional Practice. New York City: John Wiley & Sons. OCLC 2454572. Archived from the original on April 16, 2016 – via Google Books.
- Jordan, John Woolf, ed. (1914). Genealogical and Personal History of Beaver County, Pennsylvania, Volume 1. New York City: Lewis Historical Publishing Company. OCLC 6427397. Archived from the original on April 13, 2016 – via Google Books.
- Knoblock, Glenn A. (2012). Historic Iron and Steel Bridges in Maine, New Hampshire and Vermont. Jefferson, North Carolina: McFarland & Company, Inc. ISBN 978-0-7864-8699-1. OCLC 775680863. Archived from the original on April 1, 2016 – via Google Books.
- Maxwell, Hu; Swisher, Howard Llewellyn (1897). History of Hampshire County, West Virginia from its Earliest Settlement to the Present. Morgantown, West Virginia: A. Brown Boughner, Printer. OCLC 680931891. OL 23304577M.
- McKeown, Bonnie (1991). Capon Lake Bridge Interview with Branson Himelwright. Burlington, West Virginia: West Virginia Division of Highways District 5.
- Tyrrell, Henry Grattan (1911). History of Bridge Engineering. Chicago: Henry Grattan Tyrrell. OCLC 2898376. Archived from the original on April 11, 2016 – via Google Books.
- Virginia House of Delegates; Virginia General Assembly (1828). Journal of the House of Delegates of the Commonwealth of Virginia; Begun and Holden in the City of Richmond, In the County of Henrico. Richmond, Virginia: Thomas W. White. Archived from the original on January 11, 2014 – via Google Books.
- West Virginia Division of Highways District 5 (1991). Capon Lake Bridge Interview with Jacob "Moss" Rudolph. Burlington, West Virginia: West Virginia Division of Highways District 5.
- West Virginia State Road Commission (1936). Annual Report of the State Road Commission of West Virginia, 1935–36. Charleston, West Virginia: West Virginia State Road Commission. OCLC 16834834.
- West Virginia State Road Commission (1938). Annual Report of the State Road Commission of West Virginia, 1937–38. Charleston, West Virginia: West Virginia State Road Commission. OCLC 16834834.
