= Capon Springs Run =

River in West Virginia, United States

Coordinates: 39.158438°N 78.534455°W

Capon Springs Run is a 4.8-mile-long (7.7 km) tributary stream of the Cacapon River in Hampshire County of West Virginia's Eastern Panhandle. Capon Springs Run is a shallow, stony, non-navigable stream fed by the famous "Capon Springs" at its source on the flanks of Great North Mountain east of the hamlet of Capon Springs. The stream flows west through Capon Springs Resort, parallel to Capon Springs Road (West Virginia Secondary Route 16) along Middle Ridge and meets with Himmelwright Run. To the south, Capon Springs Run is bound by the George Washington National Forest. At its confluence with Dry Run at Capon Springs Station, the stream is met by the old Winchester and Western Railroad grade where a trestle and passenger station once existed. Capon Springs Run enters the Cacapon at the old Capon Lake Whipple Truss Bridge in Capon Lake.

Capon Springs Run primarily serves agriculture purposes with segments used for livestock watering and all of its segments and wetlands used by wildlife.

== See also ==
- List of rivers of West Virginia
