= Winchester and Western Railroad =

Railroad in the eastern United States

Overview
- Parent company: OmniTRAX
- Headquarters: Winchester, Virginia; Bridgeton, New Jersey, U.S
- Reporting mark: WW
- Locale: Virginia, West Virginia, Maryland, New Jersey
- Dates of operation: 1921–present

Technical
- Track gauge: 4 ft 8 1/2 in (1,435 mm) standard gauge

Other
- Website: WW New Jersey WW West Virginia if

The Winchester and Western Railroad (reporting mark WW) is a shortline railroad operating from Gore, Virginia to Hagerstown, Maryland. It also operates several lines in southern New Jersey, connecting to Conrail Shared Assets Operations at Millville and Vineland.

== Growth ==
The company's original line opened in 1917, extending west from Winchester to Wardensville WV, and while the 'Winchester and Western Railroad' operating company went through several reorganizations, it remained independent of larger carriers.

In 1986, it grew considerably by adding newly acquired trackage when Conrail sold off parts of the former Pennsylvania Railroad. The W&W acquired the line from Winchester to Hagerstown, as well as the greater part of its New Jersey trackage — formerly parts of the Pennsylvania-Reading Seashore Lines and Central Railroad of New Jersey (CNJ).

A short ex-CNJ branch from Bridgeton to Seabrook was acquired later from the Jersey Southern Railway in 1987.

The W&W is exclusively a freight line with the majority of its traffic supplied by the quarry of its parent company, Unimin, in Gore. In New Jersey, the W&W also serves Unimin sand interests and some grain traffic.

== History ==
=== Formation (1916-1921) ===
The Winchester & Western was initially incorporated on August 16, 1916, for the purpose of tapping the forests of southeastern Hampshire County, West Virginia, and southwestern Frederick County, Virginia, to supply railroad ties and timber to the Baltimore and Ohio Railroad. The idea of building such a conduit to tap these resources had been conceived during World War I when the traffic on the railways of the United States had been greatly increased. More ties were needed to maintain the lines already in use as well as to construct new railways. A way to transport the hardwood timbers to the tie mills in Winchester was needed, and so the Winchester and Western was conceived.

The Baltimore and Ohio factored greatly in the W&W's construction. Its local subsidiary, Winchester Lumber Company, owned various tracts of mountainous woodlands in Hardy, Hampshire, and Frederick counties. It sought to build a 40-mile narrow gauge line from Winchester to Wardensville, which would bisect the rich timber lands in the possession of the Winchester Lumber Company.

The Winchester Lumber Company sought the services of the Intermountain Construction Company to construct the line. It was decided to make it standard-gauge. Intermountain started the grading of the railroad line from east and west of Chambersville, located west of Winchester in Frederick County. Because of the numerous supply and machinery shortages caused by World War I, Intermountain constructed the grade of the railroad using mule-powered scoops, sledgehammers, and hand-held drills. By August 1917, Intermountain had cleared a flat right-of-way to Gainesboro and began laying the rails and ties. On January 14, 1918, the first income-producing train carried 16,000 rail ties to Winchester.

From Gore, the W&W turned southward through Back Creek valley toward Rock Enon Springs and ultimately to Wardensville. On June 14, 1919, a "golden spike" ceremony was planned on the West Virginia/Virginia line near Capon Springs with only fifteen miles until completion. After politicians from both Hampshire and Frederick Counties delivered speeches, Hugh B. Cline, chairman of the Frederick County Board of Supervisors, and Judge F.B. Allen of the Hampshire County Court each hammered a spike. The "golden spike" celebration was then topped off with lunch at the Mountain House at Capon Springs Resort in Capon Springs.

On May 25, 1921, the Winchester and Western was finally completed to Wardensville. A celebration was held to honor the W&W's completion; former West Virginia Governor John J. Cornwell delivered a speech predicting the positive effect that the railroad would have on the future growth of the region's economy. Cornwell's brother William B. Cornwell of Romney was the president of the Winchester and Western Railroad at the time; he previously had been president of the Hampshire Southern Railroad in the South Branch Potomac River valley in the 1910s.

=== Early Days & Decline (1921-1944) ===
Throughout the 1920s, beginning in May 1921, the Winchester and Western was primarily a bustling freight line with limited passenger service. The W&W's first passenger vehicle, a railbus, was literally an automobile bus placed on rails. The railbus made two round-trips daily between Winchester and Wardensville with 17 intermediate stops along the way. The most popular of these was Capon Springs Station, where passengers would arrive to dine or vacation at the Capon Springs Resort. Three automobile "railbuses" later made the two round-trips between Winchester and Wardensville. Major passenger and freight stations also were constructed at Gainesboro and Gore. The W&W's own terminal was located at the Baltimore and Ohio Station at Kent and Piccadilly Streets in Winchester.

While freight traffic was the main business of the W&W, the residents of the Winchester area frequently chartered trains for pleasure trips to not only Capon Springs, but for scenic excursions and picnics at Capon Lake on the Cacapon River.

In the 1920s, the line was constructed further past Wardensville on three narrow-gauge spurs known as the Lost River Railroad. The use of these spurs and the mainline itself dwindled by the early 1930s as the Great Depression took its toll on the region's economy. Freight traffic to and from Wardensville declined and the line was trimmed back to Capon Springs Station in 1934 due to the exhaustion of the region's timber reserves. That same year, passenger service to Capon Springs ended, and the track was cut at Rock Enon Springs. The W&W further trimmed back its line during World War II in 1944 when it was cut at Gore.

The railroad would slowly die out and remain inactive until 1972.

=== Revitalization (1972-2019) ===
In 1972, Unimin purchased the sand mine at Gore from Virginia Glass Sand. They restarted the Winchester and Western railroad, and began operations, shipping sand from Gore to Unimin customers. In 1986, it purchased the Conrail (formerly Pennsylvania RR/Penn Central) "Winchester Secondary" line from Winchester to Williamsport, Maryland, and in 1987, it purchased three shortlines in southern New Jersey. The company now has two divisions; the "Virginia Division," and the "New Jersey Division." Both serve Unimin interests, as well as other freight. Both have connections with the two eastern mainline railroads, CSX Transportation and the Norfolk Southern Railway.

The period between the 1970s and early 2000s was considered a "golden era" in the railroad's history, where ALCO locomotives pulling bright, Chessie System hoppers would regularly be seen running between Gore and Hagerstown. This train would be nicknamed "The Sandman". Back up in New Jersey, the railroad was also seeing success. In the 1980s, the railroad acquired EMD GP-9, and GP-10 locomotives from Conrail. The railroad also needed a new paint scheme, and they decided to look towards the past at their EMD's original owner, the Nickel Plate Road. The new paint scheme was based on NKPs design and is still in use today.

In the early 2000s, the company began modernizing. The aging ALCO's were either sold or scrapped, and replaced with newer EMD GP38 locomotives. Then, the engine shop in Gore was rebuilt. Luckily, the railroad retained its older EMDs and they can still be seen in service today.

=== OmniTRAX Ownership (2019-present) ===
In 2018, Unimin merged with Santrol to form Covia, and subsequently sold the railroad to OmniTRAX. In 2024, The Covia sand mine in Gore idled, and the railroad ceased its operations there; Though, the railroad continues to operate its engine shop in Gore. Despite the closure of the line's only customer, the W&W maintains the line from Gore to Winchester. Currently, the W&W uses the Carmeuse mine in Clearbrook, VA as their main supplier and runs a train known as the "West Virginian Sandman". The railroad started delivering limestone to a factory making kitty litter in Martinsburg, West Virginia.

== Course ==
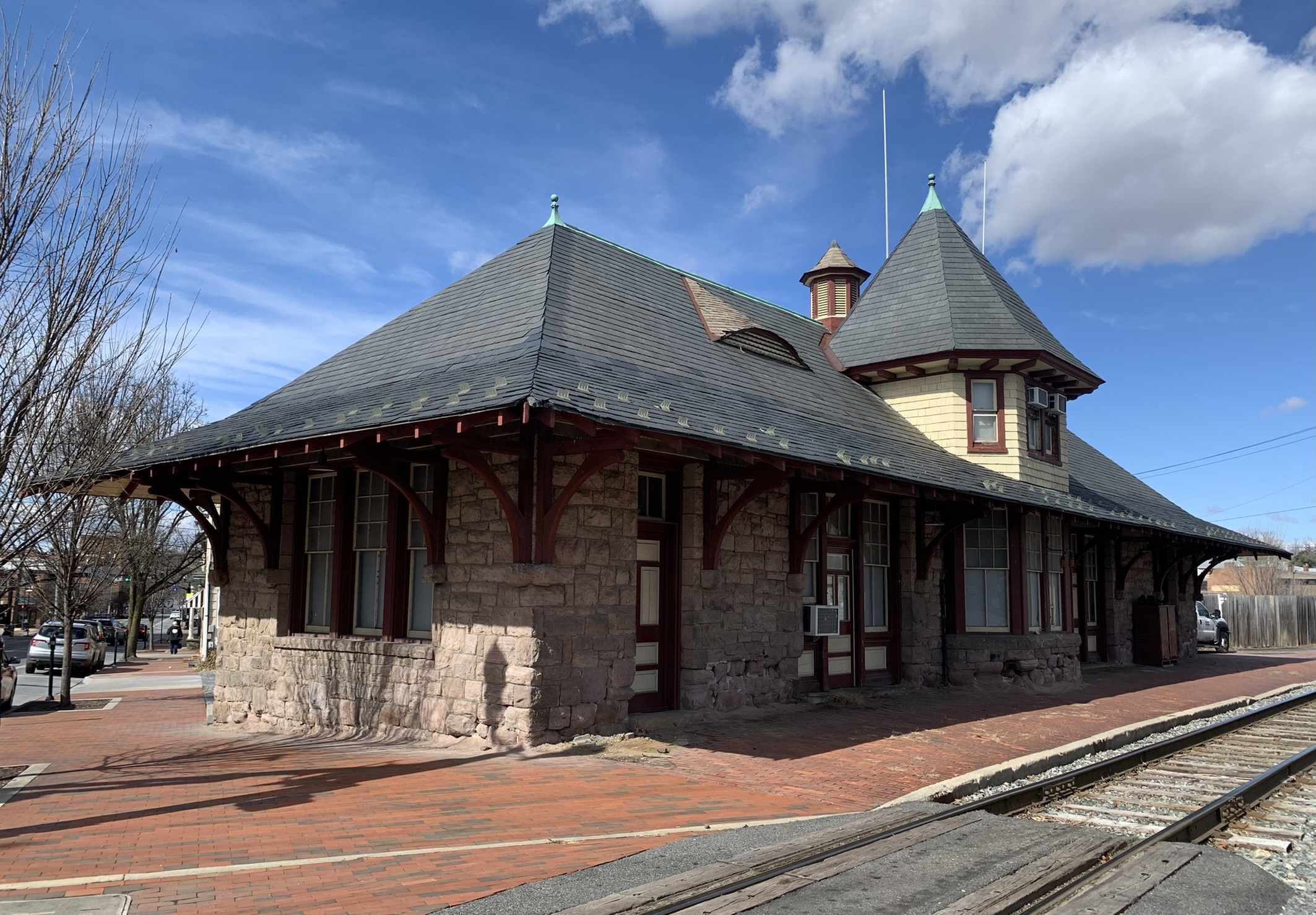
Winchester and Western Railroad station in downtown Winchester, Virginia

From the B&O's old central station in downtown Winchester, the Winchester and Western Railroad ventures south and then follows Abram's Creek west out of the city. From there, the W&W travels northwest, eventually parallelling the Northwestern Turnpike (U.S. Route 50) where it goes through Hoop Petticoat Gap along Gap Run at Chambersville, today known as Round Hill. Still heading in a northwest direction with the Northwestern Turnpike, the W&W departs from the turnpike and follows Hogue Creek north, southeast of Hayfield. The W&W continues north until it intersects with the North Frederick Pike (U.S. Route 522) and enters the community of Gainesboro. The line then curves southwest into the Back Creek valley. At the southern edge of Bowling Green Ridge, the W&W crosses the Northwestern Turnpike one last time and follows Back Creek south to Gore. From Gore, the line heads south along Mine Spring Run where it currently ends at the sand mine.

This list includes all of the communities and stations that have been served at one time by the original Winchester and Western Railroad. The towns are listed from Winchester to Wardensville:

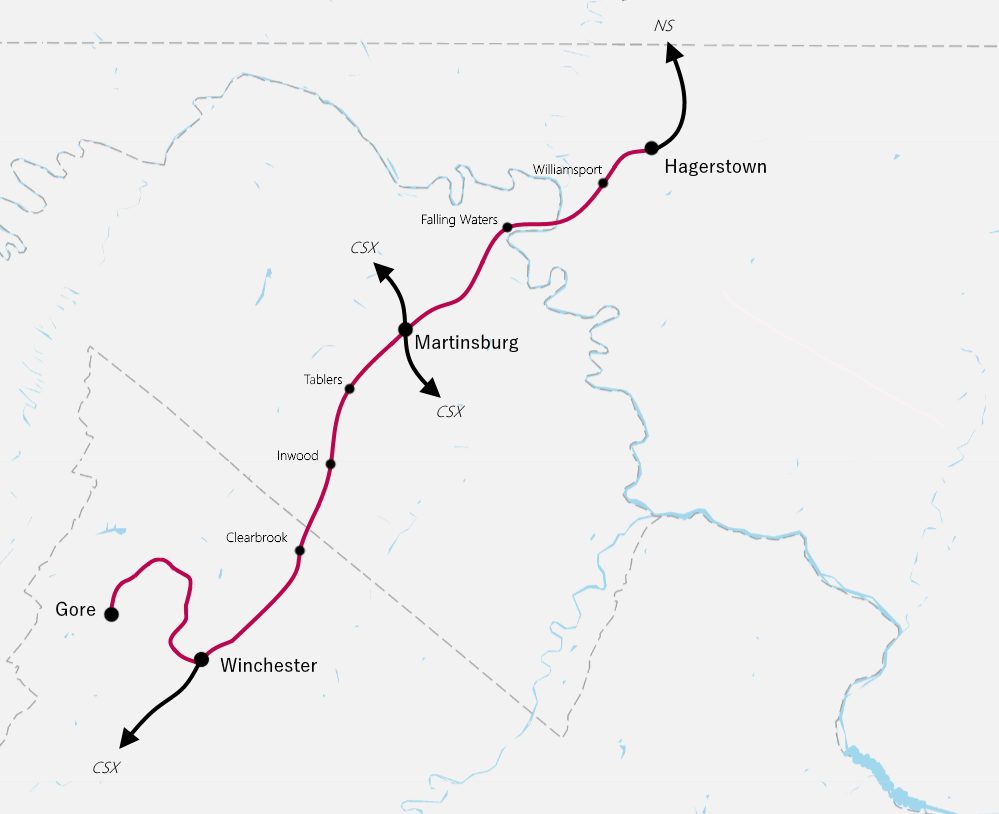
Map of WW's Virginia Division

Frederick County, Virginia

- Winchester
- Chambersville
- Hayfield
- Indian Hollow
- Gainesboro
- Gore
- Rock Enon Springs

Hampshire County, West Virginia

- Shiloh
- Capon Springs Station
- Capon Lake
- Intermont

Hardy County, West Virginia

- Wardensville

== Locomotive Fleet ==
The Winchester & Western operates a diverse fleet of locomotives. Before the onset of diesel power, the WW owned multiple steam locomotives, though not much is known about them. All locomotives currently belonging to the railroad are diesel-electric powered, with most being built by EMD. The railroad's fleet consists of hand-me-downs from other railroads. Almost all older, non-EMD locomotives were scrapped due to aging and standardization. Most GP9 locomotives were sold to OMLX after it acquired the railroad in 2019. Today, the railroad maintains its fleet of EMD locomotives and puts them to work on its various trains.

Known Locomotives
Builder	Model	Road Numbers	Build Date	Origin	Status	Notes
EMD	GP9	403	June, 1954	Ex-Tidewater Grain 3403. Built as TNO 403.	Active	Renumbered to 9006 in 2022. Active in New Jersey
EMD	GP9	445	January, 1955	Ex-SP 5608	Active	to OMLX as 9007 in 2021. Active in Washington, Georgia as of December 2025.
EMD	GP9	459	July, 1955	Ex-N&W 2459. Built as NKP 459.	Unknown	Last seen in Virginia around 2017. Most likely sold to OMLX.
EMD	GP9	475	July, 1955	Ex-N&W 2475. Built as NKP 475.	Unknown	Last seen in New Jersey in 2019. Sold to OMLX.
EMD	GP9	498	August, 1956	Ex-N&W 2498. Built as NKP 498.	Unknown	Last seen around 2021. Sold to OMLX.
EMD	GP9	517	March, 1958	Ex-N&W 2517. Built as NKP 517.	Unknown	Last seen in 2020 wearing the OMLX badge.
EMD	GP9	520	March, 1958	Ex-N&W 2520. Built as NKP 520.	Active	Active in New Jersey.
EMD	GP9	709	November, 1956	Ex-Conrail 7090. Built as PRR 7090.	Unknown	To OMLX in 2021. Last seen at Gore in December, 2022.
EMD	GP9	732	November, 1955	Ex-Conrail 7323. Built as NYC 5923	Active	Active up until 2018, when it was sold to the DRRV. Then it was rebuilt into a GP-10 and renumbered to 1823. On long-term lease to the MDDE/DCR, wearing a ceremonial "New Jersey Veterans" paint scheme.
EMD	GP9	811	February, 1959	Ex-N&W 2811. Built as NKP 811.	Active	Active until 2018, when it was sold to BDRV. Later, it was sold to the BRW where it remains to this day.
EMD	GP10	1006 (formerly 572)	October, 1959	Ex-Conrail 7572	Active	Active in Virginia.
EMD	GP10	1002 (formerly 575)	November, 1959	Ex-Conrail 7575	Active	Active in Virginia.
EMD	GP10	576	June, 1954	Ex-BDRV 1848	Active	Active in New Jersey as of 2025.
EMD	GP10	752	February, 1956	Ex-Conrail 7527. Build as NYC 5972.	Inactive	Stored out of service in New Jersey.
EMD	GP10	8066	December, 1954	Ex-Eastern Shore 8066. Built as IC 9066	Scrapped	Used for parts at Gore.
EMD	GP38-2	3815 (formerly 2182)	February, 1966	Ex-ICG 3104	Inactive	Currently being repaired at the WW locomotive shops, located in Gore, VA.
EMD	GP38-2	2689	April, 1971	(GMTX Lease Unit) Ex-Conrail 7907. Built as PC 7907.	Active	Active in Virginia.
EMD	GP38-2	3816 (formerly 2196)	Unknown	Unknown	Active	Active in Virginia.
EMD	GP38-2	3817 (formerly 2197	May, 1969	Ex-GMO 705	Active	Active in Virginia.
EMD	NW2	149	June, 1947	Ex-UCMX 1042. Built as Southern 2258.	Unknown	Served various industrial companies before being sold to the W&W's parent company, Unimin. It served Unimin in Georgia before being transferred to their mine in Gore; Thus, making it a part of the W&W fleet. Last seen around 2010.
EMD	SD9M	954	April, 1957	Ex-NS 54. Built as NKP 352 (SD9).	Active	Active in New Jersey as of 2025.
EMD	SW1	8411	September, 1940.	Ex-B&O 211, later renumbered to 8411.	Active	Served in Virginia during the 1970s. Active as a in-house switcher to Chambersburg Cold Storage in Chambersburg, PA.
EMD	SW7	1200	May, 1950	Ex-Conrail 9071. Build as PRR 9391	Active	On long-term lease to Gerdau Recycling in Norfolk, VA.
EMD	FP7A	97C	January, 1951	Ex-Milwaukee Road 97C	Inactive	Sold to MMID. It eventually ended up with VILX, and was renumbered to 637. Still around but inactive, and in bad shape.
ALCO	MT-4 (former RS-11)	10 (formerly 1007)	December, 1957	Ex-Conrail 1007. Built as PRR 8654	Inactive	Sat on blocks outside the engine shop and used for parts, before presumably being scrapped around the late 2000s.
ALCO	MT-4 (former RS-11)	120	December, 1957	Ex-Conrail 1020. Built as PRR 8647	Inactive	Stored out of service in New Jersey. Equipped with a cab.
ALCO	MT-4 (former RS-11)	210	Unknown	Unknown. Most likely ex-Conrail	Scrapped	Scrapped 2019.
ALCO	RS-11	351	November, 1957	Ex-Norfolk & Western 351	Inactive	Sold to DL. Survives as a parts source unit.
ALCO	RS-11	353	December, 1957	Ex-Norfolk & Western 353	Scrapped	Scrapped sometime in the 1990s.
ALCO	RS-11	863	February, 1959	Ex-Norfolk & Western 2863	Active	Sold to FRR: Renumbered 1802. Active for FRR.
ALCO	RS-11	3609	September, 1956	Ex-Central Vermont 3609. Built as Norfolk & Western 367.	Active	Sold to MCRR in the early 1990s and Renumbered to 367. Eventually ended up with SVRR and continues to actively serve them.
ALCO	RS-11	605 (formerly 3605)	September, 1956	Ex-Quaboag Transfer 3605	Scrapped	Scrapped before 2000.
ALCO	RS-11	3611	September, 1956	Ex-Quaboag Transfer 3611	Inactive	Sold to MMCX, Later sold to DL: Renumbered 1805 around 2007. Survives as a parts source unit.
ALCO	RS-3	527	August, 1950	Ex-Amtrak 123. Built as New Haven 0527.	Scrapped	Scrapped after a broken Crankshaft.
ALCO	MRS-1	2098	April, 1953	Ex-USAX 2098	Unknown	Purchased and lettered for the W&W in 1979, but was never used and returned to the owner, Eveready Machinery Co.
ALCO	MRS-1	2112	April, 1953	Ex-USAX 2112	Active	Sold to the KRM. Later sold to MSDR and continues to serve.
ALCO	S-2	16	November, 1948	Ex-WYT 106. Built as BO 522	Unknown	Served in New Jersey in the 1980s. Later sold to OMID and renumbered 106.
ALCO	S-6	78	December, 1955	Ex-SP 1278	Scrapped	Very Active on the Sandman around 1985–1990. Scrapped around 2014.
ALCO	S-6	80	December, 1955	Ex-SP 1280	Scrapped	Active before being scrapped around 2014.
GE	70-Ton	1952	October, 1951	Original Owner	Unknown	Purchased by the W&W in 1951. Disposition unknown, presumed scrapped.

Preceded by South Buffalo Railway	Short Line Railroad of the Year; 2002	Succeeded by San Joaquin Valley Railroad
