= Capon (surname) =

Capon is a Norman French surname, from the Old French Chapon or Chapelain meaning a 'chantry priest'. The name ultimately derives from the Latin Capellanus. Notable people with the surname include:

- Brecht Capon (born 1988), Belgian football player
- Edmund Capon (1940–2019), British-Australian art scholar
- John Capon (died 1557), Benedictine monk
- Laura Capon Fermi (1907–1977), Italian and American writer and political activist
- Paul Capon (1912–1969), British writer
- Robert Farrar Capon (1925–2013), American Episcopal priest and author
- Stephen Capon (1927–2017), English cricketer
- William Capon (1480–1550), Fellow of Jesus College
- William Capon (artist) (1757–1827), painter and scene designer
