= Shiloh, Hampshire County, West Virginia =

- Unincorporated community
- Location within West Virginia Location within the United States
- Coordinates: 39°10′57″N 78°25′54″W
- Country: United States
- State: West Virginia
- County: Hampshire
- Time zone: UTC-5 (Eastern (EST))
  - Summer (DST): UTC-4 (EDT)
- GNIS feature ID: 1718715

Shiloh is an unincorporated community in Hampshire County in the U.S. state of West Virginia. Shiloh is located on Gore Road (West Virginia Secondary Route 23/11) near the Virginia line. Shiloh was once a stop on the old Winchester and Western Railroad. The community was named for Shiloh, a site mentioned in the Hebrew Bible that contained the Ark of the Covenant.
