= Stephen Capon =

English cricketer

Personal information
- Born: 25 April 1927; Snodland, Kent
- Died: 3 March 2017 (aged 89); Bristol
- Batting: Right-handed
- Bowling: Right-arm fast-medium

Domestic team information
- Years: Team
- 1950: Kent

Career statistics
Competition	First-class
Matches	1
Runs scored	4
Batting average	4.00
100s/50s	0/0
Top score	4
Balls bowled	156
Wickets	0
Bowling average	–
5 wickets in innings	–
10 wickets in match	–
Best bowling	–
Catches/stumpings	0/–
- Source: CricInfo, 5 February 2012

Stephen Capon (25 April 1927 – 3 March 2017) was an English cricketer who made one first-class cricket appearance for Kent County Cricket Club in 1950. Capon batted right-handed and bowled right-arm fast-medium pace. He was born at Snodland in Kent.

Capon made his only appearance for the Kent First XI in the 1950 County Championship against Nottinghamshire at Trent Bridge. He played seven times for Kent's Second XI in the Minor Counties Championship between 1950 and 1955.

He died at Bristol in March 2017 aged 89.
