= Sycamore Dale =

Historic house in West Virginia, United States

- U.S. National Register of Historic Places
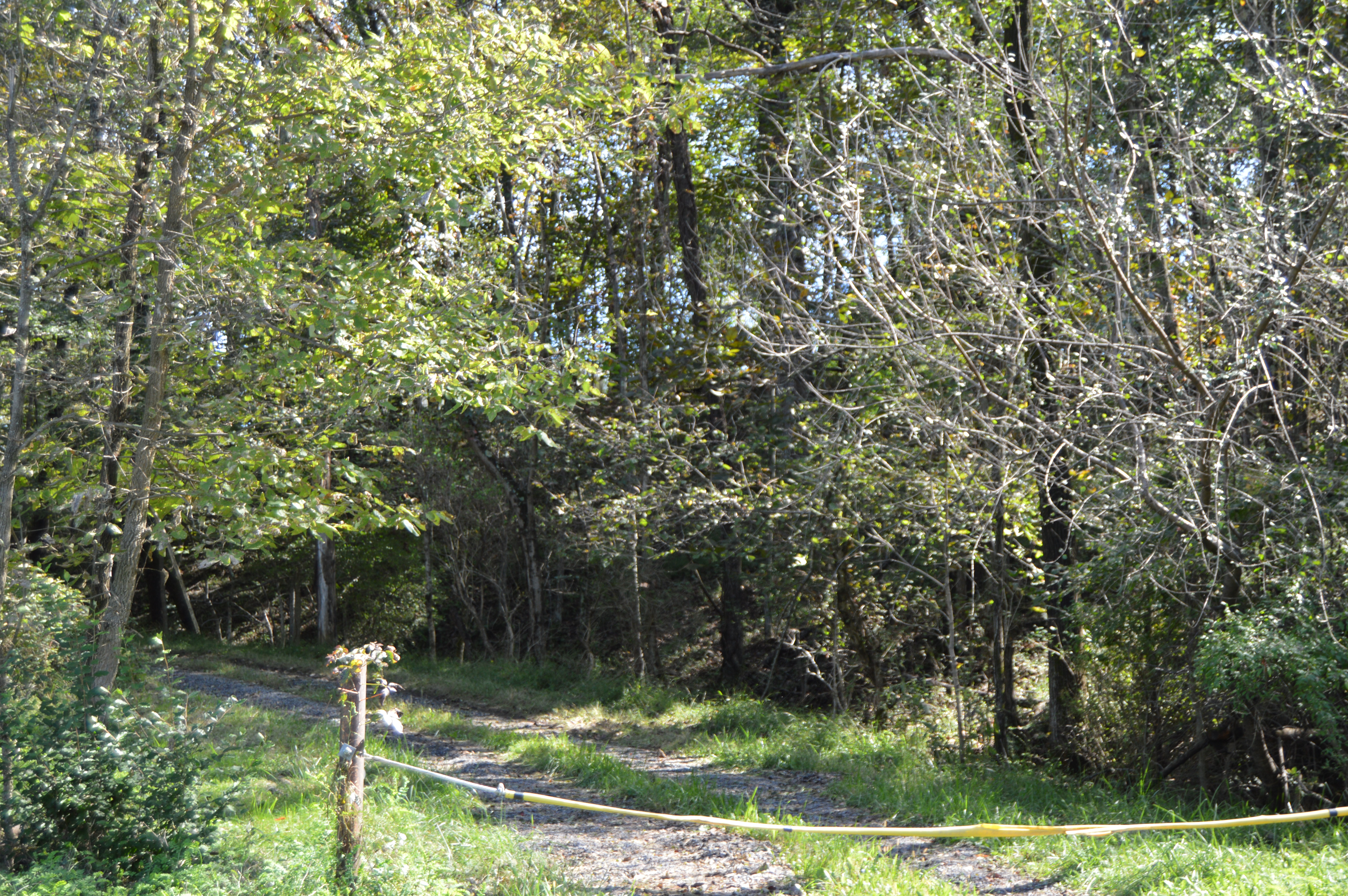
- Property entrance

- Location within Eastern Panhandle of West Virginia Location within West Virginia Location within the United States
- Location: South Branch River Road (County Route 8), Romney, West Virginia
- Coordinates: 39°20′15″N 78°46′24″W
- Area: 3 acres (1.2 ha)
- Built: 1836–1839
- Architectural style: Greek Revival
- NRHP reference No.: 80004021
- Added to NRHP: December 2, 1980

Sycamore Dale (also known as the Gibson-Wirgman-Williams House) is a 19th-century Greek Revival plantation house overlooking the South Branch Potomac River southwest of Romney, West Virginia. Sycamore Dale is one of several historic estates along South Branch River Road (County Route 8). It was listed on the National Register of Historic Places on December 2, 1980.

== History ==
=== Construction ===
Sycamore Dale was constructed for David Gibson between 1836 and 1839 with the use of slave labor. The slaves involved with Sycamore Dale's construction numbered over 100.

=== American Civil War ===
==== General Lew Wallace ====
Due to its location adjacent to the Romney Covered Bridge which carried the Northwestern Turnpike across the South Branch Potomac River, Sycamore Dale's vicinity was a strategic location for forces attempting to take Romney during the American Civil War. When Union Army forces first moved on Romney on June 11, 1861, there was resistance by Confederate States Army forces to their crossing of the covered bridge. The resistance consisted of Confederate sharpshooters who had commandeered Sycamore Dale and were using it as a "sharpshooter's nest." The Union forces, commanded by General Lew Wallace (later Governor of New Mexico Territory, United States Ambassador to the Ottoman Empire, and author of best-seller historical fiction novels such as Ben-Hur: A Tale of the Christ), advanced across the bridge and succeeded in dislodging the Confederates. Following the skirmish, General Wallace gave orders for Sycamore Dale to be burnt before proceeding up Town Hill into Romney. Upon his return later in the day, General Wallace found the house unscathed and, after heated inquiry, found that his captain had been dissuaded from the act of arson by the owner, David Gibson. After listening to Gibson's plea himself, General Wallace relented and, it is said, briefly used the house as his headquarters. General Wallace wrote part of Ben-Hur: A Tale of the Christ during his stay at Sycamore Dale.

==== McNeill's Rangers surrender ====
Another significant event of the American Civil War to occur at Sycamore Dale was the surrender of the McNeill's Rangers. McNeill's Rangers was an independent irregular Confederate military company commissioned under the Partisan Ranger Act by the Congress of the Confederate States on April 12, 1862. After the Act's repeal on February 17, 1864, McNeill's Rangers was one of two partisan companies allowed to continue operation, the other being Mosby's Raiders. The Rangers numbered no more than 60 to 70. Captain McNeill and his Rangers surrendered to Union Army forces on April 12, 1865, on Sycamore Dale's front lawn. Other sources cite that while Romney was last held by Confederate Army forces on April 15, local tradition states that McNeill's Rangers surrendered at Sycamore Dale on May 8. Led by Jesse McNeill, the 36 Rangers threw their weapons into a pile on Sycamore Dale's lawn and then the Union officers reluctantly agreed to release the Rangers. This surrender was one of the final actions of the American Civil War in West Virginia.

== Architecture ==
=== Exterior ===
Sycamore Dale's brickwork is laid in a Flemish bond arrangement. The bricks used in its construction were fired in the home's vicinity. Its lumber was also milled nearby. Sycamore Dale is graced with two end chimneys and a medium gable roof of tin. The front of the house is symmetrically divided into five bays centered on a large two-story, one bay wide portico. This two-story portico is supported by eight Tuscan columns and is surmounted on the second level with a Greek Revival style pediment with plain entablature. Both the first and second levels of its portico have Greek Revival entrance doors, both of which are flanked by triple-paned sidelights and surmounted by multi-paned transoms. There is a wrought iron balustrade on both levels of the portico, and stone steps leading to the first level of the portico. The five bay front elevation, which is 52 feet in width, has six over six sash windows, one on each level of each bay, surmounted by paneled wood lintels and flanked by white wooden shutters. The length of the home's ell is 87 feet. A one-story porch measuring 65 feet runs along the outer ell. A two-story, enclosed porch at the home's rear was an early 20th-century addition and has been removed by the present owners. There were once extensive slave quarters on the grounds of Sycamore Dale's estate which are no longer extant.

=== Interior ===
Sycamore Dale's original hand-carved interior woodwork has been preserved. Many of the home's doors are also hand-carved. As a testament to Sycamore Dale's role in the American Civil War, several bullet holes remain in the home's woodwork. The two end chimneys service Sycamore Dale's four large fireplaces. The home is also filled with period furnishings, most of which are Antebellum or Victorian in origin.

== See also ==
- List of historic sites in Hampshire County, West Virginia
- National Register of Historic Places listings in Hampshire County, West Virginia
