= Covia =

Mining company based in New Canaan, Connecticut, USA

Unimin Corporation
- Company type: Private
- Industry: Industrial Minerals & Mining
- Founded: New Canaan, Connecticut
- Defunct: 2018 (merged with Santrol; now Covia)
- Headquarters: New Canaan, Connecticut, USA
- Key people: Bruno Biasiotta, President and CEO
- Website: https://www.coviacorp.com/

Unimin (known as Covia since 2018) Corporation is a wholly owned subsidiary of global industrial minerals company SCR-Sibelco of Belgium. Unimin operates 44 mining and mineral processing facilities in the United States, Mexico and Canada. In Mexico, the company operates as Grupo Materias Primas de México and in Canada as Unimin Canada Ltd/Ltee. Executive offices are located in New Canaan, Connecticut with technology, analytical and sales service centers situated throughout North America. Covia has over 2,400 employees located in 19 states in the U.S., Canada and Mexico.

In 2018, Unimin merged with Santrol to become Covia.

== History ==
Founded in 1970, Unimin is one of North America's largest producers of non-metallic industrial minerals. Unimin is the world's leading producer of quartz proppants (frac sand) and a major producer of resin coated sand proppants for oil and natural gas stimulation and recovery, and the largest producer of low-iron nepheline syenite for glass, ceramic, paint and plastic applications. The company is also the world's leading producer of high purity quartz, a highly specialized product used in the fabrication of integrated circuits, solar photovoltaic cells and high intensity lighting.

Unimin's product portfolio includes industrial sand, high purity quartz, feldspar, nepheline syenite, microcrystalline silica, ball clay, kaolin, calcium carbonate and calcium quicklime and hydrate. Quicklime and hydrated lime products are produced and sold by their Southern Lime subsidiary. Unimin serves a diversified customer base with technical requirements that range from high temperature foundry and metallurgical applications, functional performance in paint, plastics and rubber manufacture, chemical reactivity in water filtration and environmental engineering, and high purity in consumer products and food processing.

Unimin has been recognized for its safety and health record with the Sentinels of Safety award by the U.S. Mine Safety and Health Administration (MSHA) and the National Mining Association (NMA). The company is also recognized by the Wildlife Habitat Council for outstanding environmental stewardship and employee volunteerism with the Corporate Habitat of the Year award, and Community Partner of the Year and Signatures of Sustainability awards.

Unimin Corporation is certified as a sustainable company by the Global Reporting Initiative (GRI).

In 2018, Unimin merged with Santrol to become Covia. The company had 2633 employees in 2020, but was forced into chapter 11 bankruptcy during the COVID-19 pandemic. It emerged from bankruptcy at the end of 2020.
