= Intermont, West Virginia =

- Unincorporated community
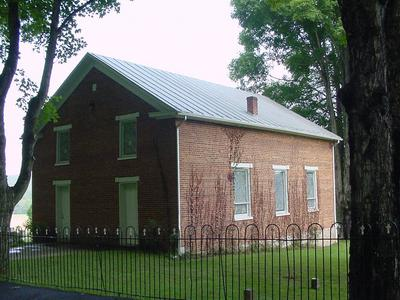
- Hebron Church

- Location within West Virginia Location within the United States
- Coordinates: 39°8′46″N 78°32′49″W
- Country: United States
- State: West Virginia
- County: Hampshire
- Time zone: UTC-5 (Eastern (EST))
  - Summer (DST): UTC-4 (EDT)
- GNIS feature ID: 1554775

Intermont is an unincorporated community in Hampshire County, West Virginia, United States, located along West Virginia Route 259 on the Cacapon River. It was originally known as Mutton Run until 1920, when its name was changed to Intermont. Because of Mutton Run's location on the Winchester and Western Railroad, it may have been renamed after the Intermountain Construction Company that completed the railroad from Winchester to Wardensville. Their post office is closed.

== Historic site ==
- Hebron Church (1849), WV Route 259
