= Capon Lake, West Virginia =

Unincorporated community in West Virginia, United States

- Unincorporated community
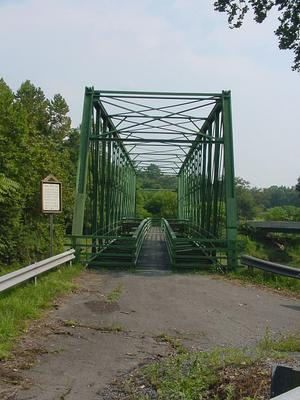
- Capon Lake's Historic Whipple Truss

- Location within Eastern Panhandle of West Virginia Location within West Virginia Location within the United States
- Coordinates: 39°9′21″N 78°32′16″W
- Country: United States
- State: West Virginia
- County: Hampshire
- Time zone: UTC-5 (Eastern (EST))
  - Summer (DST): UTC-4 (EDT)
- GNIS feature ID: 1554067

Capon Lake is an unincorporated community in Hampshire County of West Virginia's Eastern Panhandle region. Capon Lake is situated between Yellow Spring and Intermont at the junction of West Virginia Route 259 and Capon Springs Road (West Virginia Secondary Route 16) along the Cacapon River. Capon Springs Run empties into the Cacapon here across from the old Capon Lake Whipple Truss Bridge. Capon Lake takes its name from the Cacapon River's lake-like characteristics there. It was a popular picnic spot for tourists and travelers on the Winchester and Western Railroad.

== Historic site ==
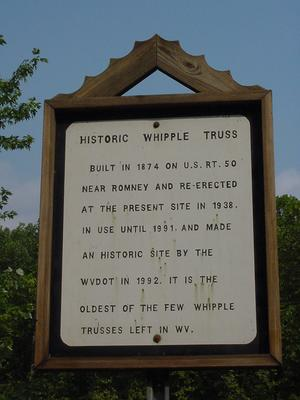
Whipple Truss placard outlining its past.

- Capon Lake Whipple Truss Bridge (1874), along WV Route 259, Listed on the National Register of Historic Places in 2011.
