= Capon Springs, West Virginia =

Unincorporated community in West Virginia, United States

- Unincorporated community
- Location within Eastern Panhandle of West Virginia Location within West Virginia Location within the United States
- Coordinates: 39°8′10″N 78°29′4″W
- Country: United States
- State: West Virginia
- County: Hampshire
- Chartered: October 1787
- Chartered: December 27, 1800
- Post office established: June 18, 1841

Population (2000)
  - Total: 95
- Time zone: UTC-5 (Eastern (EST))
  - Summer (DST): UTC-4 (EDT)
- ZIP codes: 26823
- Area code: 304
- GNIS feature ID: 1560645

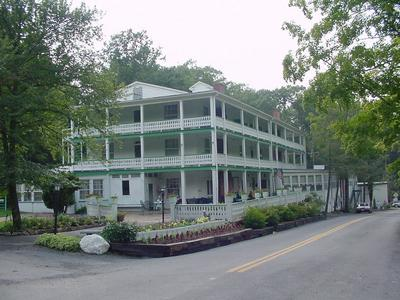
Main House at Capon Springs Resort.

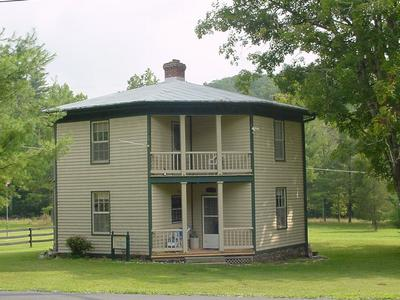
The Octagon House from Capon Springs Road.

Capon Springs is an unincorporated community in southeastern Hampshire County, West Virginia, United States. According to the 2000 census, the Capon Springs community has a population of 95. It is located on Capon Springs Road (West Virginia Secondary Route 16) along Capon Springs Run.

== History ==
The community and springs were originally known as Frye's Springs after the springs' discoverer Henry Frye. In October 1787, the Virginia General Assembly established the town of Watson at the site of the springs. It was believed that the springs possessed such healing powers that half an acre sold for $900 in gold in the late 18th century. The Virginia General Assembly chartered the town of Watson again on December 27, 1800. On June 18, 1841, a post office was established under the name Capon Springs; however, maps of Hampshire County dated 1863 and 1865 continued to show the community's name as Watson. After West Virginia seceded from Virginia in 1863, it needed to compensate Virginia for losing the springs during the Reconstruction. The Capon Springs & Farms resort is situated in the community of Capon Springs. It is registered on the National Register of Historic Places.

== Notable people ==
Herman Guy Kump (1877–1962), 19th Governor of West Virginia, and American educator Arthur R. M. Spaid (1866–1936) were born in Capon Springs.

== Variant and historical names ==
Capon Springs and its post office have been known by several varying names throughout its history, which include:

- Cacapehon Spring
- Cacapon Springs
- Frye's Springs
- Fryes Spring
- Fryes Springs
- Watson
- Watson Town
- Watsontown
- Watsonville

== Historic sites ==
- Brill Octagon House, Capon Springs Road (CR 16)
- Capon Springs Resort, Capon Springs Road (CR 16)
- Old Red Store, Capon Springs Road (CR 16) & McIlwee Road (CR 16/1)

== Bibliography ==
- Kenny, Hamill (1945). West Virginia Place Names: Their Origin and Meaning, Including the Nomenclature of the Streams and Mountains. Piedmont, West Virginia: The Place Name Press.
- Lewis, Virgil Anson (1889). History of West Virginia: In Two Parts. Philadelphia: Hubbard Brothers. OCLC 4270768.
- Maxwell, Hu & Swisher, Howard Llewellyn (1897). History of Hampshire County, West Virginia From Its Earliest Settlement to the Present. Morgantown, West Virginia: A. Brown Boughner, Printer. OCLC 680931891 – via Internet Archive.
- McMaster, Len (January 2010). "Hampshire County West Virginia Post Offices, Part 1" (PDF). La Posta: The Journal of American Postal History. Vol. 40, no. 1. La Posta Publications. pp. 37–46. Archived from the original (PDF) on February 23, 2019.
- Secrest, Abraham Thompson, ed. (1922). Spaid Genealogy from the First of the Name in This Country to the Present Time with A Number of Allied Families and Many Historical Facts. Columbus, Ohio: Nitschke Brothers. OCLC 285160392 – via Internet Archive.
