= Capon Springs Resort =

- Capon Springs
- U.S. National Register of Historic Places
- U.S. Historic district
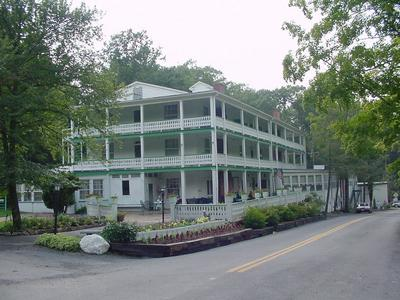

- Location within Eastern Panhandle of West Virginia Location within West Virginia Location within the United States
- Location: Capon Springs Road (CR 16); Capon Springs, West Virginia
- Coordinates: 39°7′59″N 78°28′45″W
- Architectural style: Late Victorian, Greek Revival
- NRHP reference No.: 93001228
- Added to NRHP: November 12, 1993

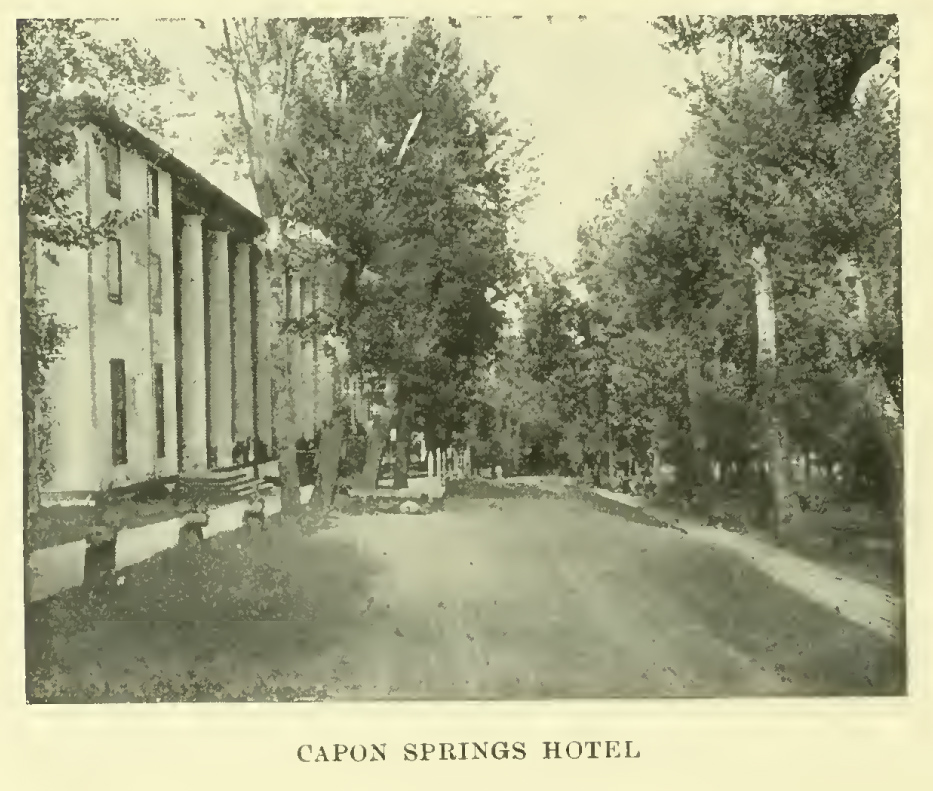
Capon Springs Hotel, circa 1909

Capon Springs, also known as Frye's Springs and Watson Town, is a national historic district in Capon Springs, West Virginia that includes a number of resort buildings ranging in age from the mid-nineteenth century to the early 20th century. The area grew around a mineral spring discovered by Henry Frye in the 1760s, so that by 1787 the town of Watson had been established. By 1850, the 168-room Mountain House Hotel had been built, enduring until it burned in 1911. Also in 1850, the state of Virginia built Greek Revival bath pavilions and the President's House. A period of decline followed the Mountain House fire, but rebuilding began in the 1930s under the ownership of Louis Austin. The resort is still in Austin family ownership.

The resort was placed on the National Register of Historic Places in 1994.

In 2013, the resort was named West Virginia's Family-Owned Business of the Year.

== See also ==
- List of historic sites in Hampshire County, West Virginia
