= Capon Chapel =

Historic church in West Virginia, U.S.

- U.S. National Register of Historic Places
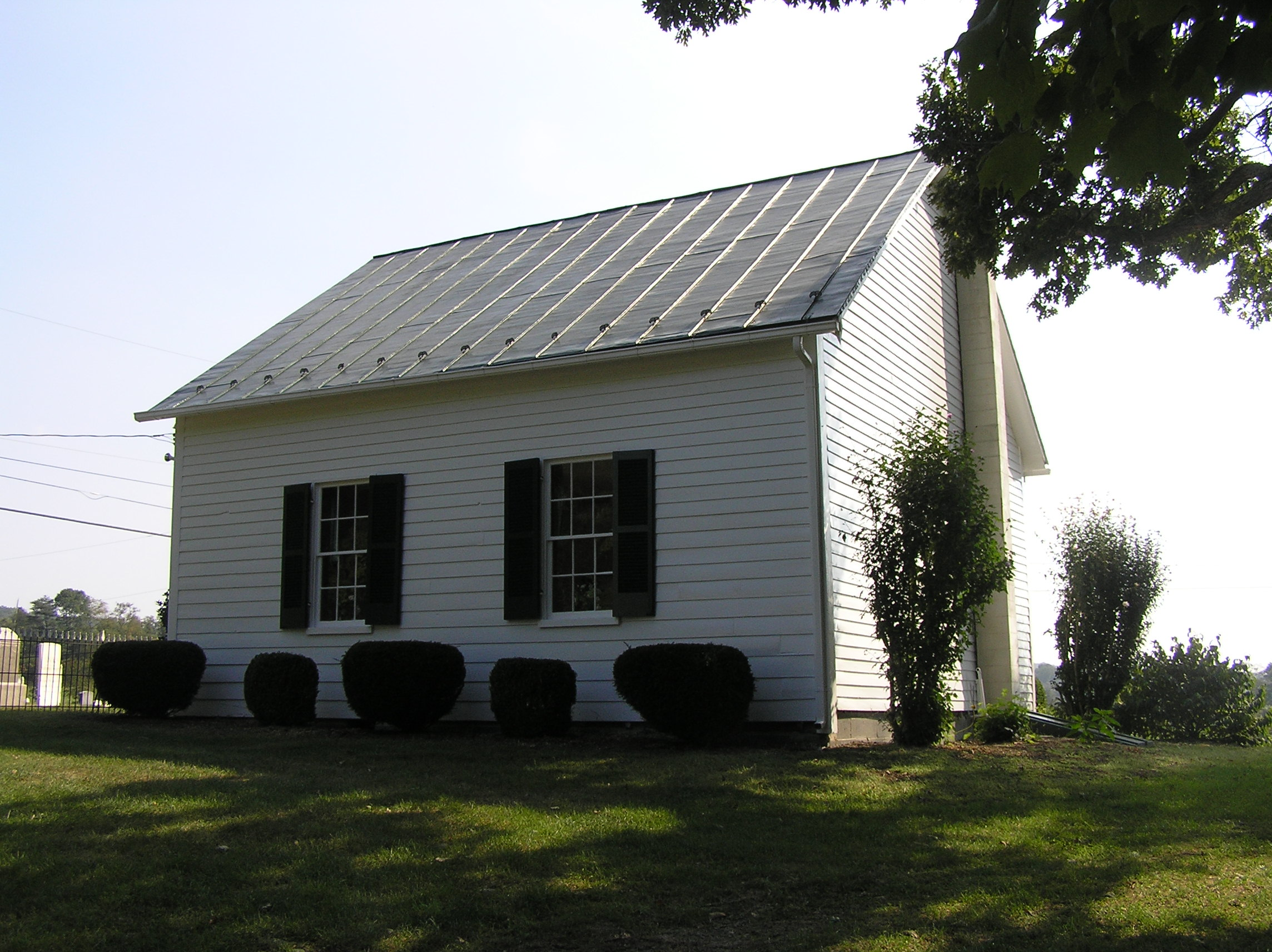
- North and west sides of Capon Chapel viewed from the northwest lawn

- Location within Eastern Panhandle of West Virginia Location within West Virginia Location within the United States
- Location: Christian Church Road (West Virginia Secondary Route 13); Capon Bridge, West Virginia, United States
- Coordinates: 39°16′12″N 78°26′39″W
- Area: 0.96 acres (0.39 ha)
- Built: c. 1852
- Architectural style: Front gable
- NRHP reference No.: 12001048
- Designated: December 12, 2012

Capon Chapel ( /ˈkeɪpən/ KAY-pən), also historically known as Capon Baptist Chapel and Capon Chapel Church, is a mid-19th century United Methodist church located near to the town of Capon Bridge, West Virginia, in the United States. Capon Chapel is one of the oldest existing log churches in Hampshire County, along with Mount Bethel Church and Old Pine Church.

A Baptist congregation was gathering at the site of the present-day church by at least 1756. Primitive Baptist minister John Monroe (1750–1824) is credited for establishing a place of worship at this site; he is interred in the church's cemetery. The land on which Capon Chapel was built originally belonged to William C. Nixon (1789–1869), a member of the Virginia House of Delegates; later, it was transferred to the Pugh family. The first documented mention of a church at the Capon Chapel site was in March 1852, when Joseph Pugh allocated the land to three trustees for the construction of a church and cemetery.

During the early years of Capon Chapel, no Protestant denomination was the exclusive owner or occupant, and the church was probably utilized as a "union church" for worship by any Christian denomination. Capon Chapel was used as a place of worship by Baptists until the late 19th or early 20th century. In the 1890s, Capon Chapel was added as a place of worship on the Capon Bridge Methodist circuit of the Southern Methodist Episcopal Church. As of 2017, Capon Chapel remains a Methodist church, now a part of the United Methodist Church, holding Methodist services four Sundays per month at 1pm. Open table communion is held on the first Sunday of each month. Capon Chapel also maintains a daily devotion hotline.

Capon Chapel's cemetery is surrounded by a wrought iron fence made by Stewart Iron Works, and contains the remains of John Monroe, William C. Nixon, West Virginia House of Delegates member Captain David Pugh (1806–1899), American Civil War veterans from the Union and the Confederacy, and free and enslaved African Americans. Capon Chapel, along with its cemetery, was added to the National Register of Historic Places on December 12, 2012, in recognition of its representation of the rural religious architecture of the Potomac Highlands region, and for its service as an important rural church in Hampshire County.

== Geography and setting ==
Capon Chapel and its associated cemetery are located to the east Christian Church Road (West Virginia Secondary Route 13), approximately 2.01 miles (3.23 km) south of Capon Bridge and 1.14 miles (1.83 km) northeast of the unincorporated community of Bubbling Spring in southeastern Hampshire County. Capon Chapel is 894 feet (272 m) east of the Cacapon River, from which the church derives its name. The church and cemetery are situated atop a grassy hill on a 0.96 acres (0.39 ha) plot of land, at an elevation of 869 feet (265 m), in a rural agricultural area within the Cacapon River Valley. Dillons Mountain, a forested and narrow anticlinal mountain ridge, rises to the west of the Cacapon River Valley, while the forested, rolling foothills of the anticlinal Timber Ridge rise to the valley's east.

The church and cemetery are accessible through a gravel driveway to the north; to the west, a cluster of tall oak trees blocks access to the road. Capon Chapel is landscaped with boxwoods on its north and south sides, a single holly on its east side, and forsythias along its west side. The Capon Chapel property consists of the church structure (c. 1852), and its associated cemetery, which is enclosed partly by the historic wrought iron fence and partly by a chain link fence. A flagpole stands at the center of the cemetery's eastern perimeter.

== History ==
=== Background ===
The land upon which Capon Chapel is located was originally part of the Northern Neck Proprietary, a land grant that the exiled Charles II awarded to seven of his supporters in 1649 during the English Interregnum. Following the Restoration in 1660, Charles II finally ascended to the English throne. Charles II renewed the Northern Neck Proprietary grant in 1662, revised it in 1669, and again renewed the original grant favoring original grantee Thomas Colepeper, 2nd Baron Colepeper and Henry Bennet, 1st Earl of Arlington in 1672. In 1681, Bennet sold his share to Lord Colepeper, and Lord Colepeper received a new charter for the entire land grant from James II in 1688. Following the deaths of Lord Colepeper, his wife Margaret, and his daughter Katherine, the Northern Neck Proprietary passed to Katherine's son Thomas Fairfax, 6th Lord Fairfax of Cameron in 1719.

Under Lord Fairfax's ownership, the Cacapon River Valley was predominantly inhabited by English-speaking settlers as early as the late 1730s. The majority of these settlers had come from Pennsylvania and New Jersey, many of whom were either Quakers or former Quakers who were attracted to the Baptist and Methodist denominations.

=== Baptist affiliation ===
The Baptists established the oldest extant churches in Hampshire County. After the end of the American Revolutionary War, Baptist preachers continued their attempt to gain a foothold in what is now the Eastern Panhandle region. During the Baptists' early growth in Hampshire County, the best known Baptist ministers were John Monroe (1750–1824) and Benjamin Stone (1743–1842). Monroe preached at the North River, Crooked Run, and Patterson's Creek churches during the early 19th century. According to historians Hu Maxwell and Howard Llewellyn Swisher in History of Hampshire County, West Virginia (1897), Monroe was a minister for Primitive Baptists, who were adherent to a strict interpretation of the Calvinist theology of the Ketocton Association. Monroe probably established a Baptist church on the site of the present-day Capon Chapel, where he is buried in the church's cemetery. However, other sources claim that a Baptist congregation began gathering at the Capon Chapel site as early as 1756.

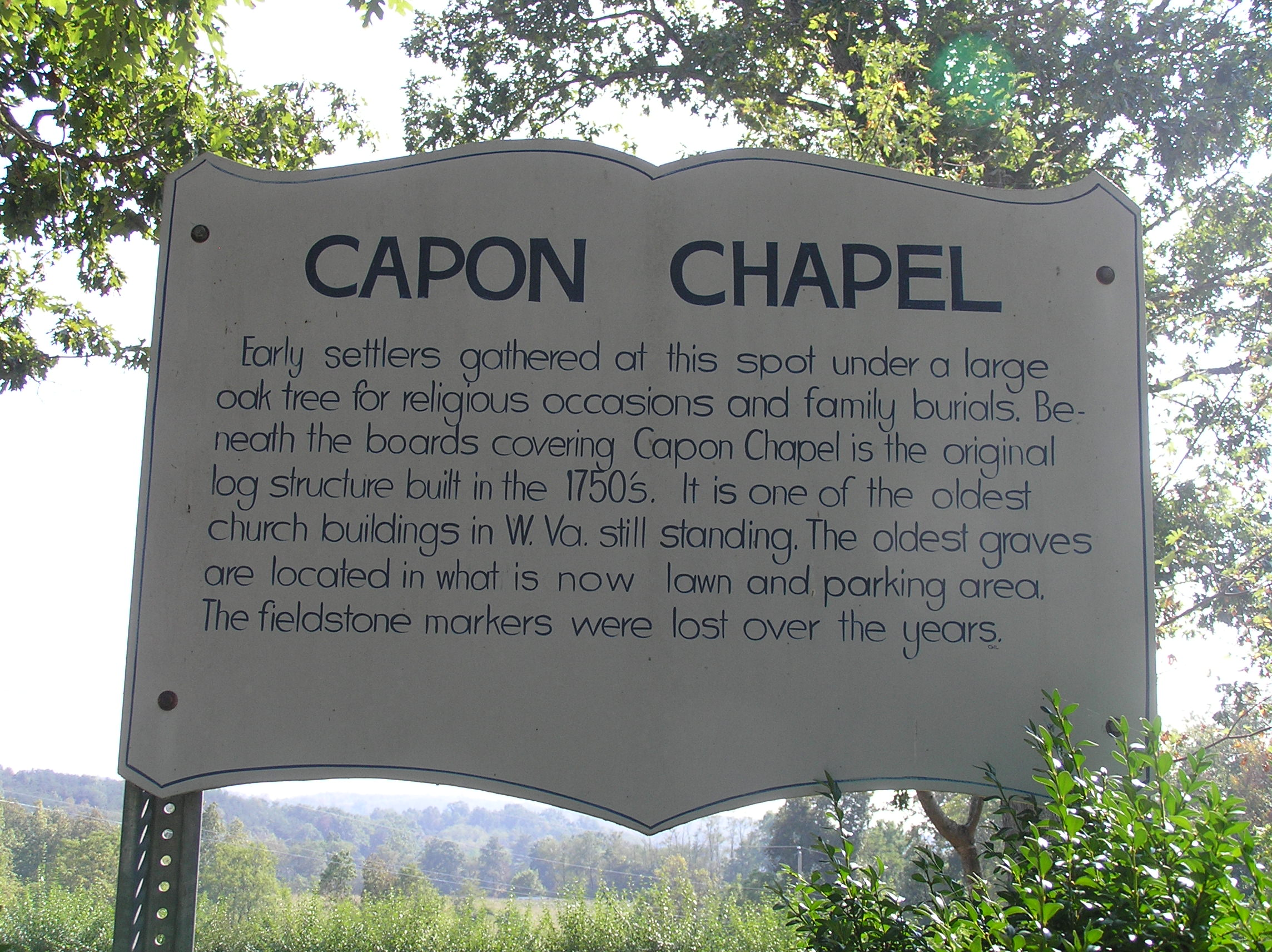
The wooden historical marker located near the west side. While it claims that construction occurred in the 1750s, existing documentation supports a construction date of around 1852.

Increased settlement and the arrival of other religious denominations in the Cacapon River Valley were further facilitated following the completion of the Northwestern Turnpike in the 1830s, which connected Parkersburg with Winchester. A small community began to develop near the turnpike's Cacapon River crossing, 2.01 miles (3.23 km) north of Capon Chapel's present-day location. The community later became the town of Capon Bridge.

The land on which Capon Chapel was built belonged to William C. Nixon (1789–1869), a member of the Virginia House of Delegates. Nixon's mother-in-law, Elizabeth Caudy (1773–1816), was the first person to be buried in the church's cemetery. While various sources estimate that Capon Chapel was built around the 1750s, there is no physical or documentary evidence to support this claim. The first documented mention of a church at the Capon Chapel site was in March 1852, when Joseph Pugh allocated 88 and one-half poles, or approximately 0.55 acres (2,200 m^{2}), to three trustees: David Pugh, another David Pugh, and Robert Pugh. The Pugh family, which was of Welsh descent, were early settlers in the Cacapon River Valley, and were one of the families that came from Wales through Pennsylvania in the late 17th century. The grant's deed told the trustees to conceive "a Graveyard and for a house for the Public Worship of Almighty God for the use of all orthodox Christians", and specified that the land was only to be used for religious worship and "for no other purpose". The deed further stipulated that inheritors of the land had to be Pugh's descendants.

During the church's early years, no Protestant denomination was the exclusive owner or occupant of Capon Chapel, which indicates that the church was probably utilized as a "union church" for worship by any Christian denomination. Since no single denomination oversaw the church during this early period, few records of its early activities and construction exist. Later records suggest that Capon Chapel was used as a place of worship by Baptists until the late 19th or early 20th century. While it remains unclear why or how the church became associated with the Baptists, its use by the denomination is possibly associated with the Second Great Awakening, a Protestant revival movement during the early-to-mid 19th century that gained momentum throughout the United States. According to the December 1904 issue of The Baptist Home Mission Monthly, the Baptist Little Cacapon Church contributed one dollar to the general fund of Capon Chapel, demonstrating that the Baptist community still continued to operate from or associate with the church in 1904.

=== Methodist affiliation ===
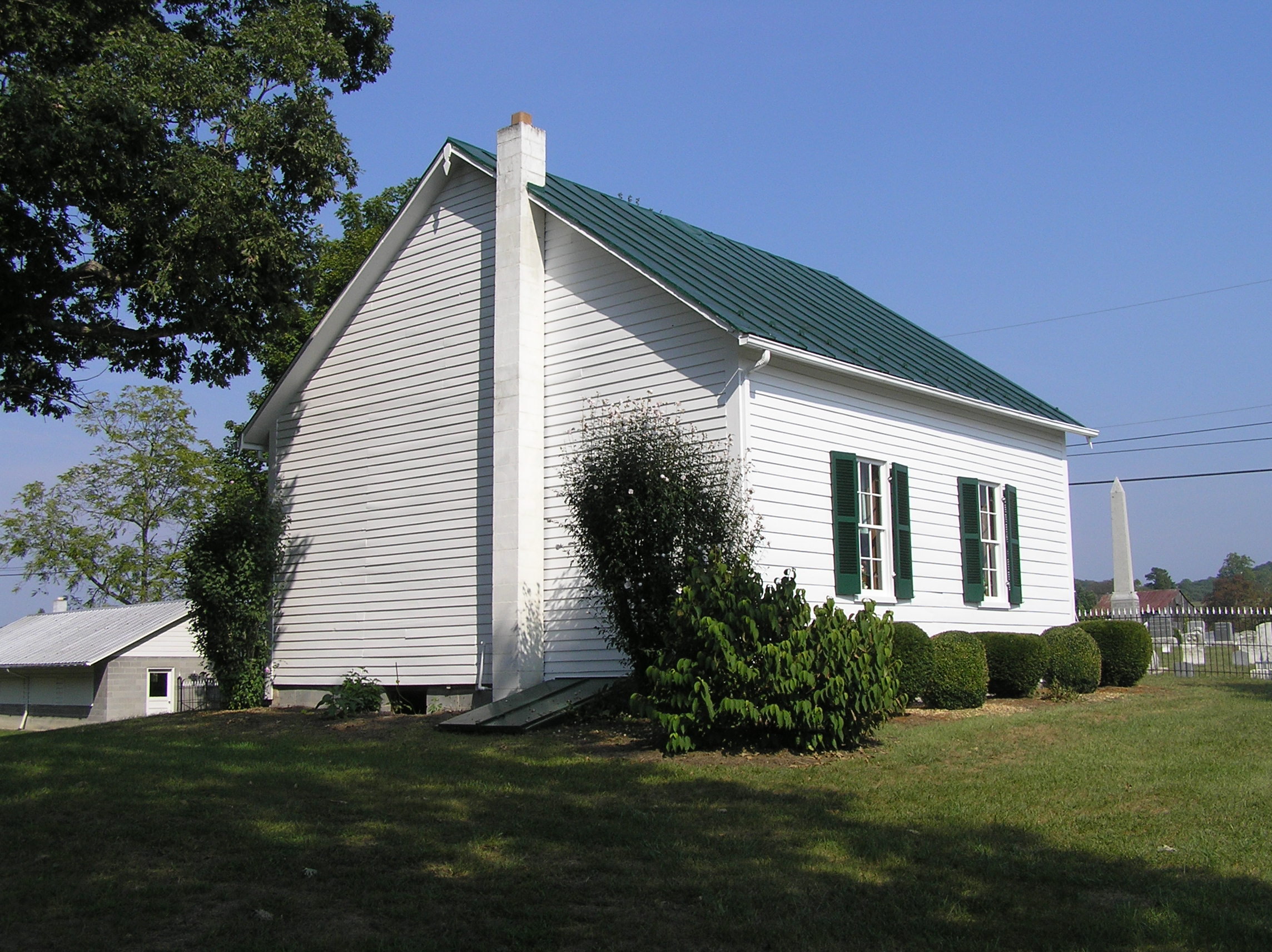
South and east sides viewed from the southwest lawn

In addition to the Baptist faith, Methodists started coming to the Cacapon River Valley during the latter half of the 18th century. Methodist Episcopal Church circuit rider Francis Asbury traveled through the Capon Bridge area in 1781. In 1890, the Southern Methodist Episcopal Church established its presence in the Capon Bridge area under the leadership of G. O. Homan. According to Maxwell and Swisher, the Capon Bridge Methodist circuit consisted of the following places in 1897: Capon Bridge, North River Mills, Green Mound, Augusta, Sedan, Park's Hollow, Sandy Ridge, and Capon Chapel. Capon Chapel was not commonly used as a Baptist place of worship by the early 20th century, and developed into a permanent stop along the Capon Bridge Methodist circuit, which later grew to include Central Church at Loom and Bethel Church at Neals Run. In 1976, the circuit's pastor was Thomas Malcolm.

Capon Chapel remains a Methodist church, now a part of the United Methodist Church. As of 2015, Capon Chapel's congregation numbers five. The church's Methodist circuit pastor is M. Christopher Duckworth; and it offers services four Sundays a month. A small group of committed congregants maintain the historic church and cemetery grounds. Brenda Hiett is the church's caretaker, as of 2015. Throughout its existence, Capon Chapel has been known by various names, including "Capon Baptist Chapel" and "Capon Chapel Church".

=== Preservation ===
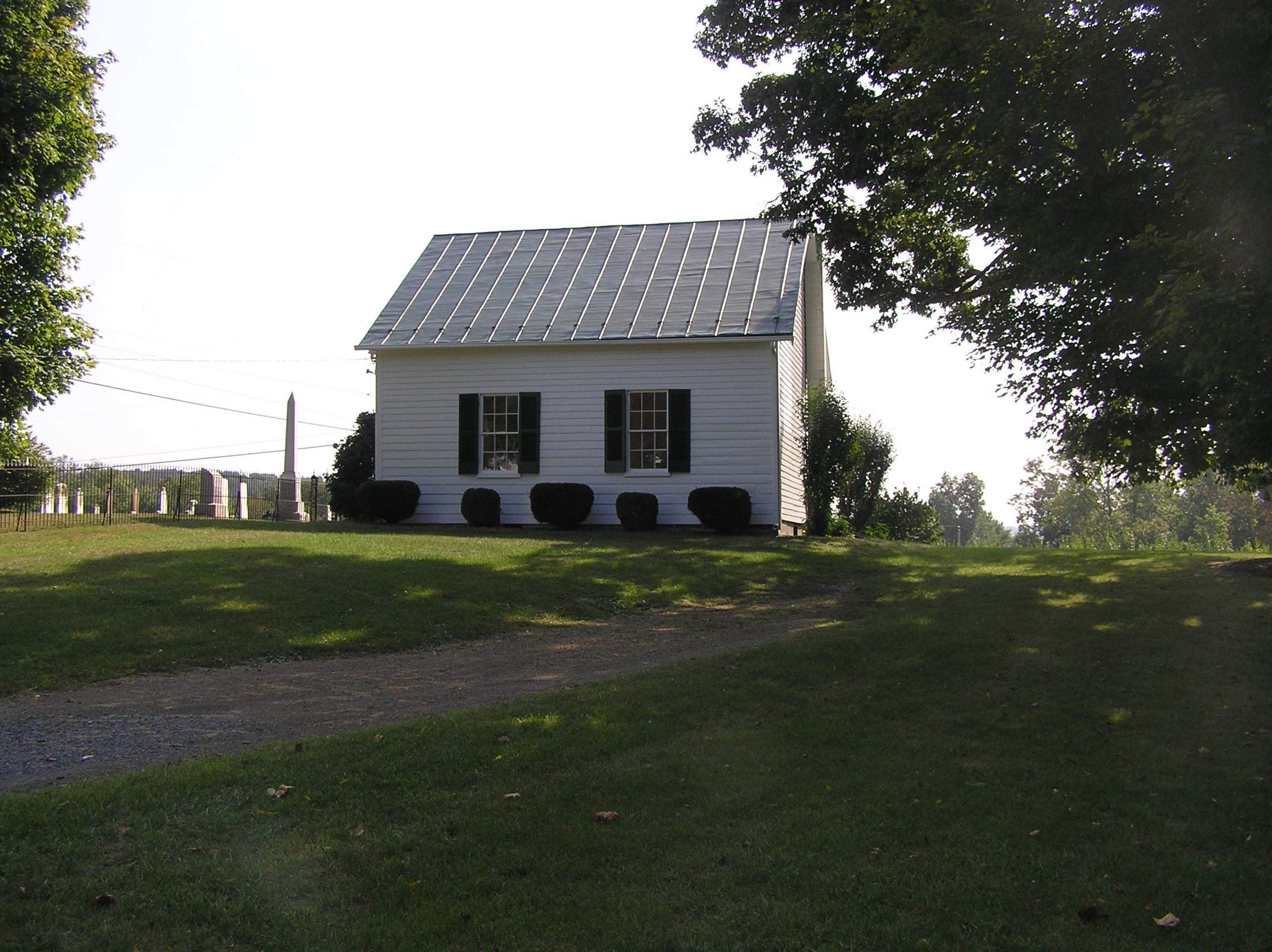
North and east sides viewed from the gravel driveway to the northwest

According to the church's caretaker, Brenda Hiett, the church's roof and siding were installed around 1900. A wrought iron fence, made by Stewart Iron Works in Cincinnati, Ohio, was installed around the church's cemetery. Electrical conduits were added to the interior of the church when it was electrified around 1930, and further electrical updates were made in 2011. The church's perimeter foundation of concrete blocks replaced the original stone piers in the early 1970s, and its wide, heart pine plank floors were sanded and re-lacquered. Around 1990, the Stewart Iron Works fence and gate were restored by White's Ornamental Ironworks.

In 2008, following surveys of historic properties throughout the county, the Hampshire County Historic Landmarks Commission and the Hampshire County Commission embarked upon an initiative to place structures and districts on the National Register of Historic Places. The county received funding for the surveys from the State Historic Preservation Office of the West Virginia Division of Culture and History. Capon Chapel was one of the first of eight historic properties to be considered for placement on the register. The other seven properties were Fort Kuykendall, Hickory Grove, Hook Tavern, North River Mills Historic District, Old Pine Church, Springfield Brick House, and Valley View. According to the Hampshire County Commission's compliance officer, Charles Baker, places of worship were not typically selected for inclusion in the register; however, Capon Chapel and Old Pine Church were exceptions, because both "started out as meeting houses". Capon Chapel is among the earliest existing log churches in Hampshire County, along with Mount Bethel Church and Old Pine Church. Capon Chapel was added to the National Register of Historic Places on December 12, 2012, in recognition of its representation of the rural religious architecture of the Potomac Highlands region, and for its service as an important rural church in Hampshire County.

== Architecture ==
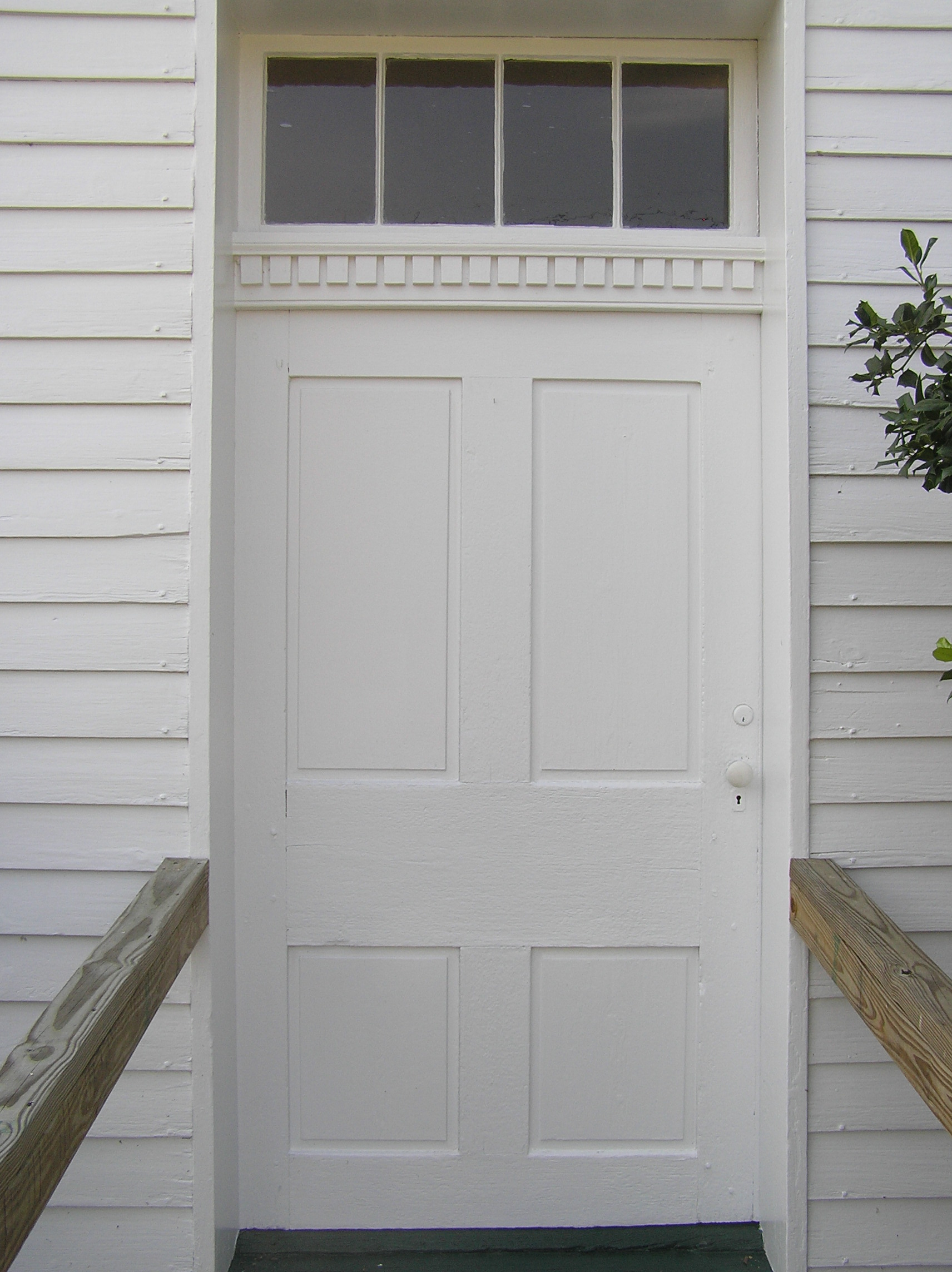
The only entryway consists of a four-paneled wooden door, capped with a four-light transom window and a dentil ornamental molding.

Capon Chapel is a single-story, rectangular, front gable log building, covered with white-painted wooden clapboard siding, and topped with a green standing seam metal roof, along with metal snow guards.

=== Exterior ===
The church's main façade is located on its east side, facing toward Timber Ridge, and away from the Cacapon River and Christian Church Road. The east side consists of a front gable façade of white-painted clapboard siding. The church has one entryway, which is a centrally located, four-paneled wooden door, topped by wooden dentil molding and a rectangular, four-light transom window. The transom is the only window on the church's east side. Unpainted wooden railings are on each side of the entryway. The clapboard siding on the church's east side is horizontal, and varies between 5 and 7 inches (13 and 18 cm) in width. The overhanging eave of the church's roof is accentuated by a single wooden drop pendant at the top of the gable. The modern electricity meter is located to the right of the main entrance. The non-loadbearing concrete block perimeter wall on this side is concealed by a stone veneer.

The west elevation is covered with white-painted clapboarding and is undecorated, with the exception of an off-center concrete block chimney and a single drop pendant similar to the one located at the top of the gable. The concrete block perimeter foundation is visible on the south side of the church, as is the metal embankment doors that allow access to the church's basement.

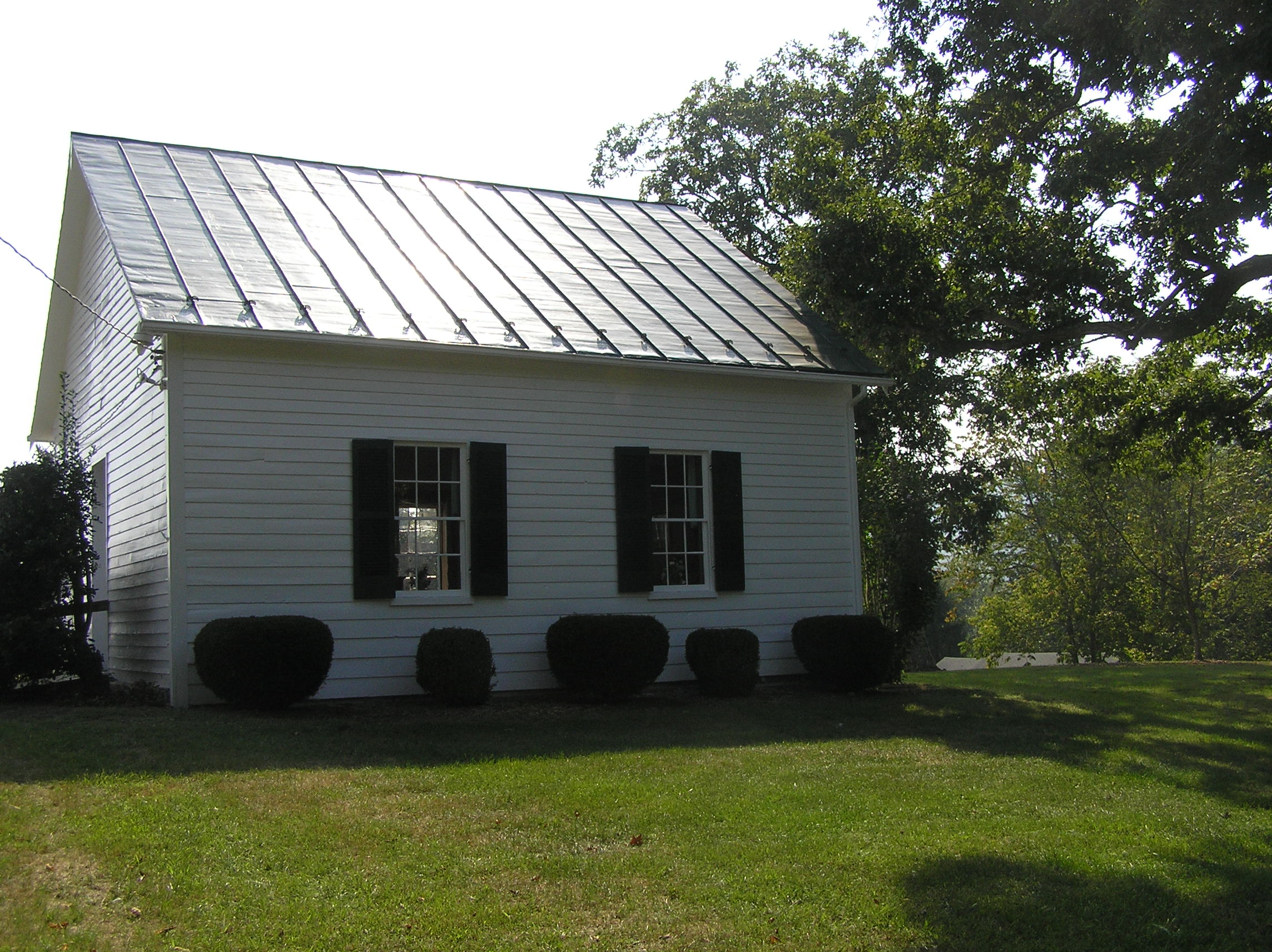
North side viewed from the north lawn

The church's north and south sides consist of two symmetrically placed six-over-six double-hung sash wooden windows, along with operable green-painted louvered wooden window shutters. The clapboard sidings vary between 3 and 6 inches (7.6 and 15.2 cm) in width. At the base of the church's north side, concrete blocks are visible under the foundation. On the church's south side, a small strip of the roof's eave confirms the original location of the chimney.

=== Interior ===
The interior of the church consists of a large, open floor plan, with wooden pews lined perpendicular to the north and south sides, thus creating a central aisle. The altar is a small wooden pulpit, which serves as a lectern that is accessible by a small wooden step; the altar is accented by a large wooden backdrop of casing with dentil molding. Each of the church's interior walls is covered with pine wainscot panelling and wallpaper, and topped with wooden crown molding. Wooden swag moldings accentuate the four symmetrically placed six-over-six double-hung sash wooden windows, the doorway's wooden casing, and the transom window. The wooden pews are simple, with cushions added for comfortable seating. The original ceiling is obscured by a dropped ceiling, which also conceals the electrical conduits for the church's brass chandeliers. Prior to the church's electrification, kerosene lanterns were used for light, and the lanterns remain in the church for decorative purposes. The church's floor consists of the original heart pine planks. Concrete blocks and cut stone border the building's perimeter to prevent animals from entering the church's crawl space. Within the crawl space, log carrier beams support the building, on which the bark remains extant.

== Cemetery ==
The cemetery is less than an acre in size and is located to the immediate east of the church, surrounded by a wrought iron fence manufactured by Stewart Iron Works. As of 2012, the cemetery contains approximately 270 interments, including John Monroe (1750–1824), Virginia House of Delegates member William C. Nixon (1789–1869), West Virginia House of Delegates member Captain David Pugh (1806–1899), American Civil War veterans from the Union and the Confederacy, and free and enslaved African Americans. Gertrude Ward (1896–1988), a local historian and orchardist, is also interred in the cemetery. Captain David Pugh was an elected representative Hampshire County, who voted to secede from the Union in 1861.

Older gravestones in the cemetery are generally cut from limestone, and the gravestones placed after 1900 are predominantly made of polished granite. Most of the gravestones have weathered significantly. The gravestones are generally rounded or rectangular in shape, and are placed on small stone foundations. The gravestones of prominent local leaders are more ornate in character, including that of Captain David Pugh and his family, who are buried under a large obelisk that lists the names of his three wives and their respective children. Nixon's gravestone is deteriorating due to advanced weathering; it is made of limestone and contains a carving of an open book. Following the purchase of a rectangular land tract around 1990, the cemetery was expanded on the east side. This section of the cemetery is excluded from the church's historically recognized boundaries, as it was not associated with the church during the period of its greatest significance.

The cemetery perimeter is lined on three sides by a cast wrought iron fence, accessible by a gate 3 feet (0.91 m) in width at its western entryway. The wrought iron fence is 4 feet (1.2 m) in height, and has approximately 1-inch (2.5 cm) diameter tubular fence posts, which are supported by three horizontal metal rails. The fence posts are capped with white-painted stylized arrows, with a ball at the tip. A shield with the emblem reading, "The Stewart Iron Works, Cincinnati, Ohio", is emblazoned on the fence's gate. The cemetery's eastern extension is surrounded by chain-link fencing.

== See also ==
- List of historic sites in Hampshire County, West Virginia
- National Register of Historic Places listings in Hampshire County, West Virginia

== Bibliography ==
- Brannon, Selden W., ed. (1976). Historic Hampshire: A Symposium of Hampshire County and Its People, Past and Present. Parsons, West Virginia: McClain Printing Company. ISBN 978-0-87012-236-1. OCLC 3121468.
- Coleman, Roy V. (1951). Liberty and Property. New York City: Scribner. OCLC 1020487 – via Internet Archive.
- Grose, Howard, ed. (December 1904). The Baptist Home Mission Monthly. New York City: American Baptist Home Mission Society. OCLC 1776385.
- Maxwell, Hu; Swisher, Howard Llewellyn (1897). History of Hampshire County, West Virginia From Its Earliest Settlement to the Present. Morgantown, West Virginia: A. Brown Boughner, Printer. OCLC 680931891. OL 23304577M.
- Munske, Roberta R.; Kerns, Wilmer L., eds. (2004). Hampshire County, West Virginia, 1754–2004. Romney, West Virginia: The Hampshire County 250th Anniversary Committee. ISBN 978-0-9715738-2-6. OCLC 55983178.
- Rice, Otis K. (2015). The Allegheny Frontier: West Virginia Beginnings, 1730-1830. Lexington, Kentucky: University Press of Kentucky. ISBN 978-0-8131-6438-0. OCLC 900345296. Archived from the original on May 27, 2016 – via Google Books.
- Rose, Cornelia Bruère (1976). Arlington County, Virginia: A History. Arlington County, Virginia: Arlington Historical Society. OCLC 2401541. Archived from the original on April 2, 2016 – via Google Books.
- Scaffidi, Sandra (May 18, 2012). National Register of Historic Places Registration Form: Capon Chapel (PDF). United States Department of the Interior, National Park Service. Archived from the original (PDF) on October 5, 2015.
- William and Mary Quarterly (April 1898). "The Northern Neck of Virginia". William and Mary Quarterly. 6 (4): 222–226. doi:10.2307/1915885. ISSN 0043-5597. JSTOR 1915885. OCLC 1607858.
- Wirtz, W. Willard (1990). Capon Valley Sampler: Sketches of Appalachia from George Washington to Caudy Davis. Silver Spring, Maryland: Bartleby Press. ISBN 978-0-910155-14-4. OCLC 20634834.
