= Old Pine Church =

1838 church near Purgitsville, West Virginia, United States

- U.S. National Register of Historic Places
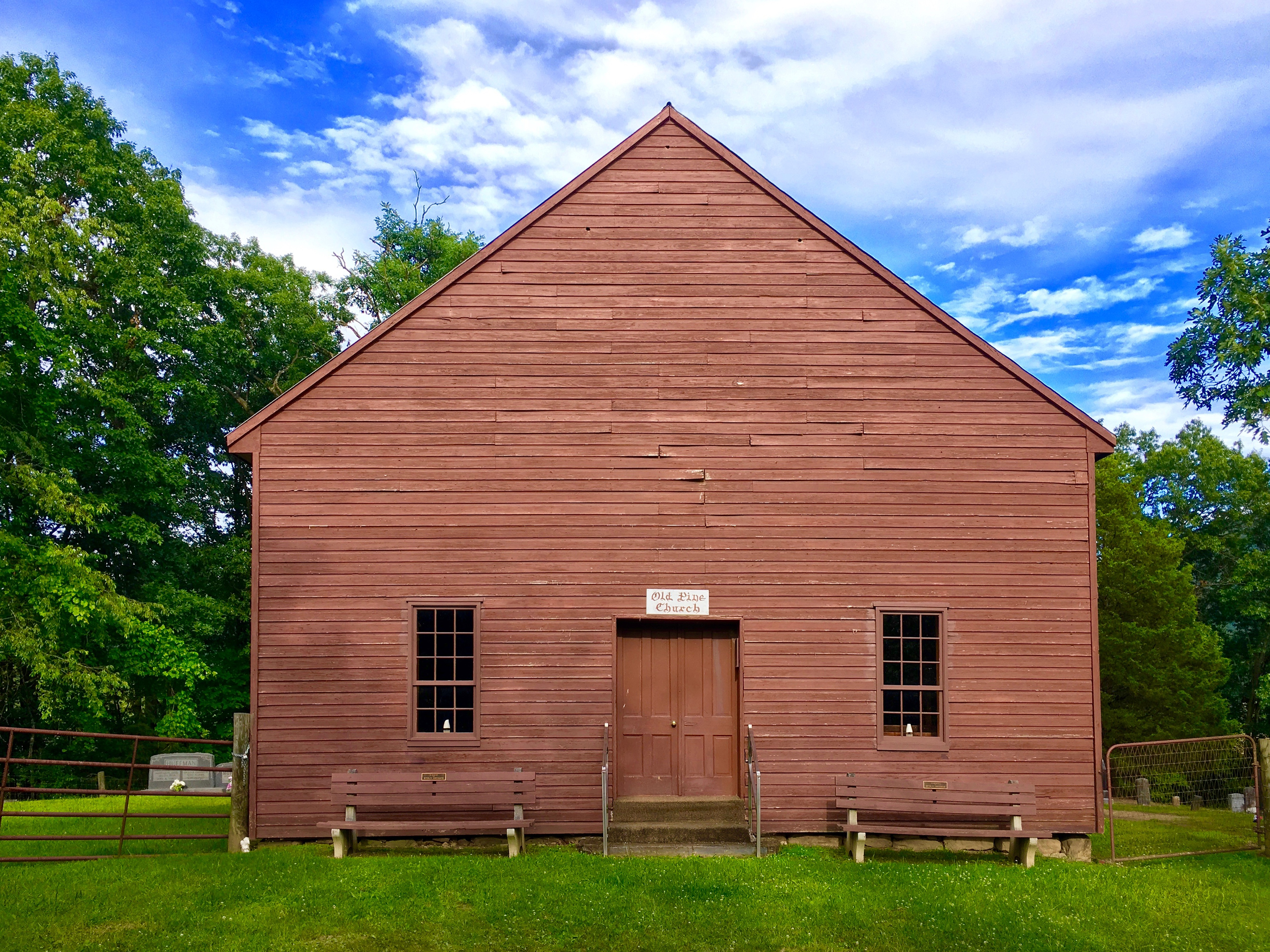
- Front of the church

- Location within Eastern Panhandle of West Virginia Location within West Virginia Location within the United States
- Location: Old Pine Church Road (West Virginia Secondary Route 220/15); Purgitsville, West Virginia, United States
- Coordinates: 39°12′55″N 78°55′33″W
- Area: 2.3 acres (0.93 hectares)
- Built: 1838
- Architectural style: Front gable
- NRHP reference No.: 12001049
- Designated: December 12, 2012

Old Pine Church, also historically known as Mill Church, Nicholas Church, and Pine Church, is a mid-19th century church located near to Purgitsville, West Virginia, United States. It is among the earliest extant log churches in Hampshire County, along with Capon Chapel and Mount Bethel Church.

The church was constructed in 1838 to serve as a nondenominational "union church". As many of the Mill Creek valley's earliest settlers were of German descent, Old Pine Church may also have been built as a meeting place for Schwarzenau Brethren adherents, known as "Dunkers" or "Dunkards". The church is believed to have also been a meeting place for German Methodist settlers. By 1870, the church was primarily used by the Brethren denomination, and in 1878, the church's congregation split into White Pine Church of the Brethren and Old Pine Church congregations. Both congregations continued to use the church until 1907.

Old Pine Church reportedly housed a school in the early 20th century while still serving as a center for worship. In 1968, residents of the Purgitsville community raised the necessary funds to perform a restoration of the church. It was added to the National Register of Historic Places on December 12, 2012, due to its "significant settlement-era rural religious architecture in the Potomac Highlands."

The church is a large, one-story, gablefront log building sheathed in brown-painted wooden German siding. The original hewn log beams are visible beneath the church, with some bark remaining on the logs. The church's interior ceiling measures approximately 15 feet (4.6 metres) in height and is clad in pressed metal panels. Several of its pews date from 1857. In the church's adjoining cemetery, the earliest extant gravestone dates from 1834, and several unmarked interment sites may exist from as early as 1759. According to architectural historian Sandra Scaffidi, "Old Pine Church and cemetery is an excellent example of one of the area's early rural church complexes."

== Geography and setting ==
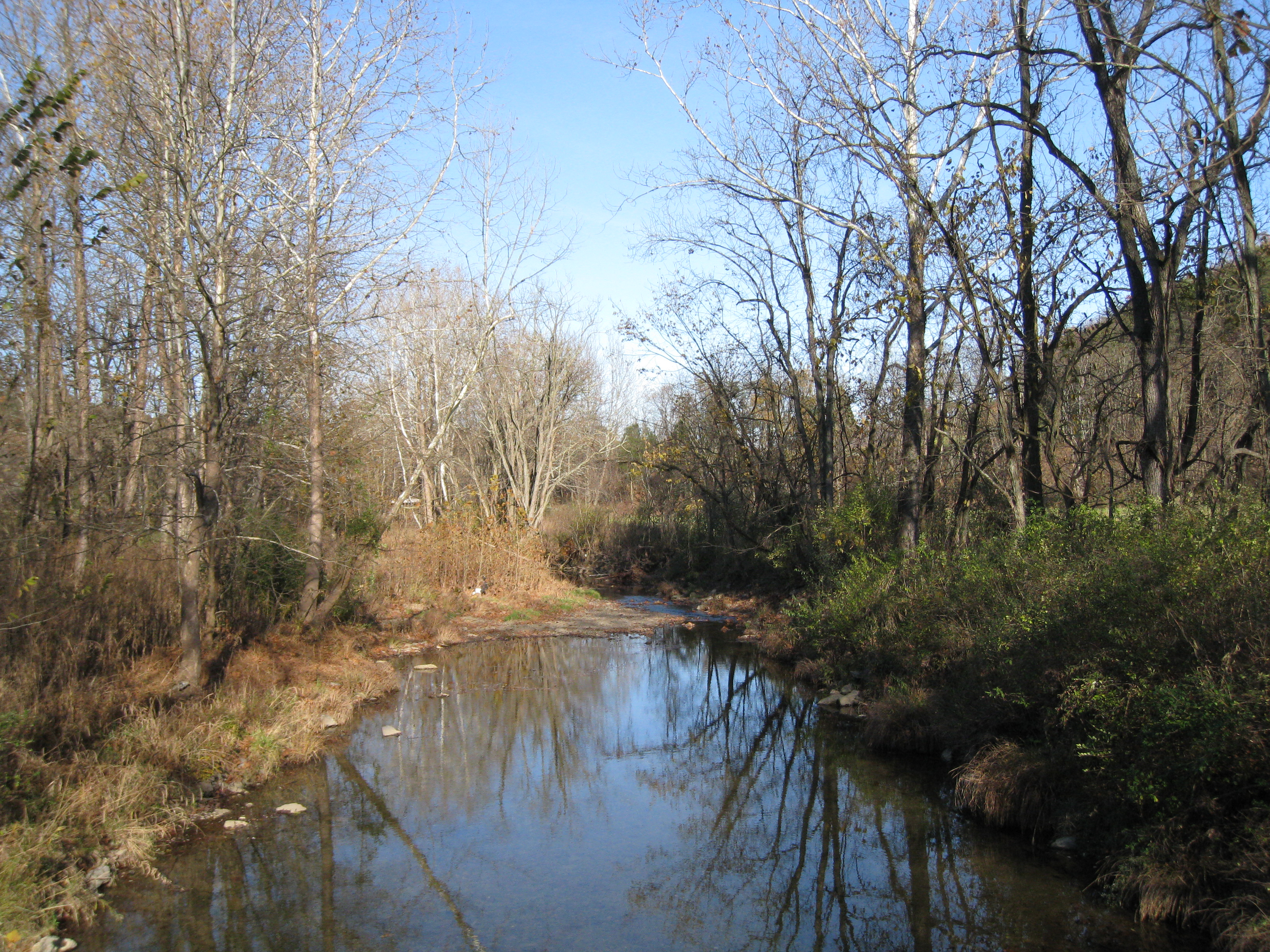
Mill Creek during the fall

Old Pine Church and its cemetery are located along the steeply sloped Old Pine Church Road (West Virginia Secondary Route 220/15), approximately 1.66 miles (2.67 kilometres) south of the unincorporated community of Purgitsville. The church and cemetery are situated on 2.3 acres (0.93 hectares) atop a bluff to the west of United States Route 220, at an elevation of 1,129 feet (344 metres). The property is surrounded by old-growth forests.

The church is in a rural area of southwestern Hampshire County within the Mill Creek valley. Patterson Creek Mountain, a forested narrow anticlinal mountain ridge, rises to the west of Mill Creek valley, and the forested western rolling foothills of the anticlinal Mill Creek Mountain rise to the valley's east. The Trough on the South Branch Potomac River is located across Mill Creek Mountain, approximately 3 miles (4.8 km) to the east of the church.

== History ==
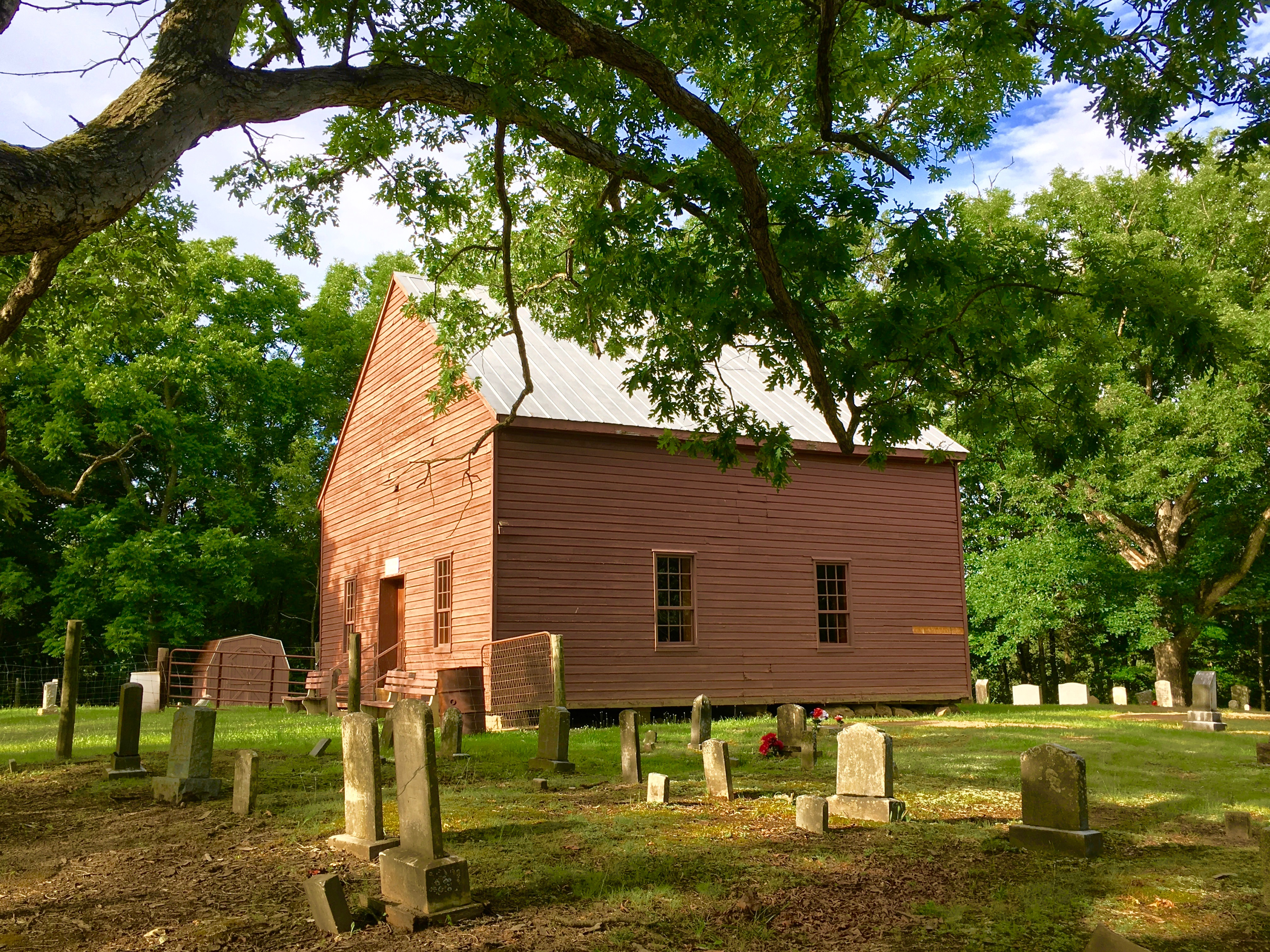
Old Pine Church seen from the cemetery garden

=== Background ===
Old Pine Church's land tract was originally part of the Northern Neck Proprietary, a land grant that the exiled Charles II awarded to seven of his supporters in 1649 during the English Interregnum. Following the Restoration in 1660, Charles II finally ascended to the English throne. Charles II renewed the Northern Neck Proprietary grant in 1662, revised it in 1669, and again renewed the original grant favoring original grantee Thomas Colepeper, 2nd Baron Colepeper and Henry Bennet, 1st Earl of Arlington in 1672. In 1681, Bennet sold his share to Lord Colepeper, and Lord Colepeper received a new charter for the entire land grant from James II in 1688. Following the deaths of Lord Colepeper, his wife Margaret, and his daughter Katherine, the Northern Neck Proprietary passed to Katherine's son Thomas Fairfax, 6th Lord Fairfax of Cameron in 1719.

The church is in the Mill Creek valley. As tensions with Native Americans were beginning to ease, Lord Fairfax sought to entice white settlers to the sparsely settled lands of his Northern Neck Proprietary. The valley was one of the first parts of present-day Hampshire County to be settled by whites, beginning in the mid-18th century. Settlers were drawn by the valley's fertility. As the valley's population grew, the unincorporated community of Purgitsville developed along Mill Creek as a trading post village; it was named for Henry Purgitt (or Purgate), who acquired 400 acres (160 ha) in the Mill Creek valley on January 7, 1785, and received a further land transfer of 137 acres (55 ha) in 1794. Purgitsville continued to develop throughout the course of the 19th century, during which time it grew to include a small store, a post office, and a blacksmith shop.

=== Establishment ===
The dates of the earliest church cannot be verified, but a church building may have been constructed at the site of Old Pine Church as early as around 1814, and possibly as early as 1792.

On September 24, 1838, William Pomkrotz and his wife, Milly, deeded a tract of land to a group of trustees, charged with constructing "a church or house for public worship for the use and convenience of Ministers and others of the Christians [sic] Denominations Whatsoever". While the deed mentioned an existing meeting house on the site, there is no extant evidence of a prior structure. According to architectural historian Sandra Scaffidi, no particular Christian denomination received sole ownership of the edifice, which suggests that the church was intended to serve as a nondenominational "union church". The church's earliest resident minister was reportedly Nicholas Leatherman, whose wife, Elizabeth High, was the daughter of George High, one of the church's original trustees.

=== Brethren affiliation ===
Few records of the church's history exist, possibly because no single denomination or organization took ownership. Several Christian denominations held meetings at Old Pine Church, including the Schwarzenau Brethren (or German Baptist Brethren), which began holding services at the church in the late 19th century. As many of the Mill Creek valley's settlers were of German descent, the Old Pine Church structure may also have been built as a meeting place for Brethren adherents, known as "Dunkers" or "Dunkards". It is believed that Old Pine Church was also used by German Methodists. The Brethren are a Christian denomination of Anabaptist origin that practiced baptism by triune immersion and exercised nonresistance. Triune immersion consists of dipping a new believer into water three times, once for each of the entities of the Holy Trinity. Brethren adherents believed only in the New Testament, and professed no other creeds. The interior of Old Pine Church, which consists of a single common space for all worshippers, also illustrates the building's connection with the Brethren and the denomination's beliefs regarding slavery. According to the minutes from the 1782 meeting of the Brethren in Franklin County, Virginia, "It has been unanimously considered that it cannot be permitted in any way by the church that a member should purchase Negroes or keep them as Slaves." While many residents in Hampshire County prior to the American Civil War were slaveholders, it is thought that Brethren adherents in the county did not own slaves or depend upon slave labor.

The Brethren denomination had been present in the South Branch Potomac River valley from as early as the 1750s although records of early Brethren congregations are not extant, possibly because they were served by itinerant ministers. As early as 1785, two brothers with the surname of Powers led a Brethren congregation in the area. In Dr. Emmert F. Bittinger's historical research on the Brethren Church in Hampshire County in his Allegheny Passage (1990), it is noted that the Church of the Brethren denomination recognized Old Pine Church as belonging to the larger Beaver Run congregation, which was centered approximately 10 miles (16 km) south of Old Pine Church. The Beaver Run congregation was the first organization of the Brethren in Hampshire County. Old Pine Church and its predecessor structures were probably utilized by members of the Beaver Run congregation because the distance between the northern region of the valley and the church on Beaver Run was too great to traverse easily. Thus, Old Pine Church began as a mission of the Beaver Run congregation. Because of its location in the vicinity of the Hardy County boundary line, the district served by the church spanned both counties.

By 1870, Old Pine Church was primarily used by the Brethren denomination. Around 1870, the Nicholas congregation of Brethren was worshiping at the church and was led by Dr. Leatherman. According to the Beaver Run Church Book, membership at Old Pine Church was 78 in 1879 and numbered 100 in 1881. The Beaver Run congregation modified its district's boundaries in 1879, which may have resulted in a division of the congregation at Old Pine Church into two factions: White Pine Church of the Brethren and Old Pine Church. Both churches continued to worship at Old Pine Church at different times. White Pine Church of the Brethren worshiped at the church from the 1870s until the construction of their own church building in 1907. By 1897, Old Pine Church remained under collective ownership by several Christian denominations although the Brethren were the church's largest shareholders. White Pine Church of the Brethren remained listed in the Brethren Conference Minutes as "Pine Church" until 1912, when members of the church petitioned the Brethren Conference to change their name from "Pine" to "White Pine".

Old Pine Church reportedly housed a school in the early 20th century while still serving as a center for worship. A small one-room addition to the church was constructed to the north façade of the building, which served as the boarding room for the school's teacher. The Old Pine Church also continued to be used for funeral services and reunions.

=== Restoration ===
In 1968, residents of the Purgitsville community raised the necessary funds to restore Old Pine Church: the church's original windows were repaired and the unpainted weatherboards painted; a new roof was installed and the original wood floor replaced. The boarding room addition was probably removed (nothing of it now remains) and the pressed metal ceiling may have been added.

=== Current use ===
As of 2012, Old Pine Church is still used for community gatherings, funeral services, revival meetings, and an annual church service. Regular church services have not taken place in the church since the middle of the 20th century. The church's adjacent cemetery also continues to be used for burials. Throughout its existence, Old Pine Church has been known by various names, including "Mill Church", "Nicholas Church", and simply "Pine Church".

In 2008, the Hampshire County Historic Landmarks Commission and the Hampshire County Commission embarked upon an initiative to place structures and districts on the National Register of Historic Places following a series of surveys of historic properties throughout the county. The county received funding for the surveying and documentation of Hampshire County architecture and history from the State Historic Preservation Office of the West Virginia Division of Culture and History. Old Pine Church was one of the first eight historic properties to be considered for placement on the register as a result of the county's initiative. The other seven properties were: Capon Chapel, Fort Kuykendall, Hickory Grove, Hook Tavern, North River Mills Historic District, Springfield Brick House, and Valley View. According to Hampshire County Commission's compliance officer, Charles Baker, places of worship were not typically selected for inclusion in the register; Old Pine Church and Capon Chapel were exceptions because both "started out as meeting houses". Old Pine Church was listed on the National Register of Historic Places on December 12, 2012, because of its "significant settlement-era rural religious architecture in the Potomac Highlands".

== Architecture ==
=== Church exterior ===
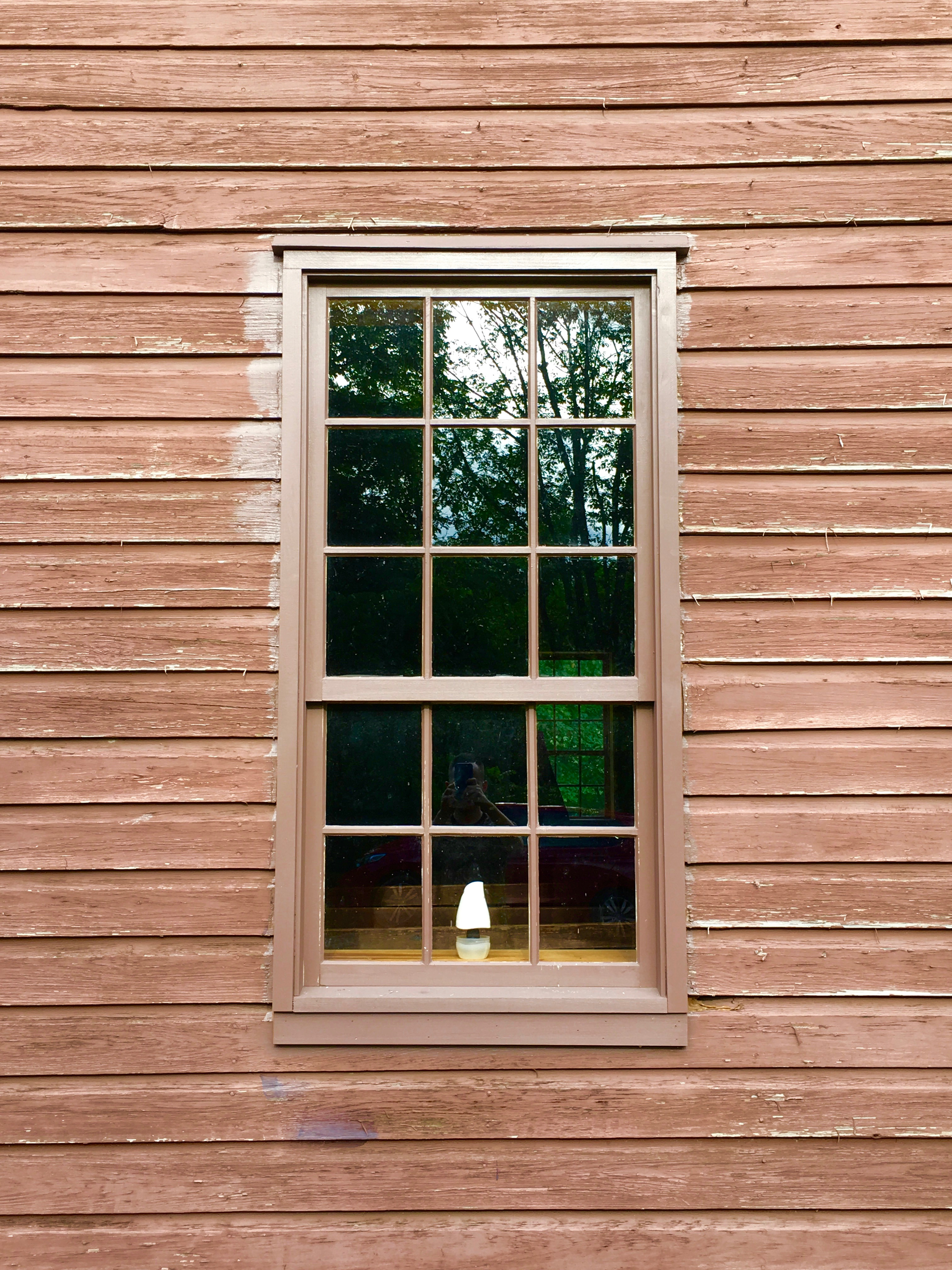
Nine-over-six double-hung sash wooden window

Old Pine Church is a large, one-story, gablefront log building. Its symmetrical front façade faces west and encompasses a main entrance consisting of a double set of four-paneled doors. The main entrance is reached by two concrete steps, on either side of which is a modern metal handrail. Above the entrance is a small wooden sign painted white reading "Old Pine Church" in black lettering. On either side of the doors are two nine-over-six double-hung sash wooden windows.

Placed symmetrically in the north and south sides of the church are two nine-over-six double-hung sash wooden windows. Between the two windows on the church's north elevation is an exterior concrete block chimney. The layout of the east-facing rear elevation of the church is also symmetrical, and features three nine-over-six double-hung sash wooden windows, with the center window placed above and between the other two windows. The church's windows have been repaired using materials consistent with original construction.

At the base of each of the church's four corners is a large uncut stone pier. Fieldstones span the church's perimeter foundations, which were added at a later date to discourage intrusion by animals. The original hewn log beams, still retaining bark, can be seen under the church. The church is covered with brown-painted wooden German siding and is crowned by a modern standing-seam metal roof.

Architectural historian Sandra Scaffidi states that the simple form and construction of Old Pine Church are indicative of the early settlers' access to materials and are an example of the log construction techniques used in the religious architecture of Hampshire County's earliest settlers. She adds that Old Pine Church is representative of a "simple design and form common to the early ecclesiastical buildings" and an "excellent example of one of the area's early rural church complexes".

=== Church interior ===
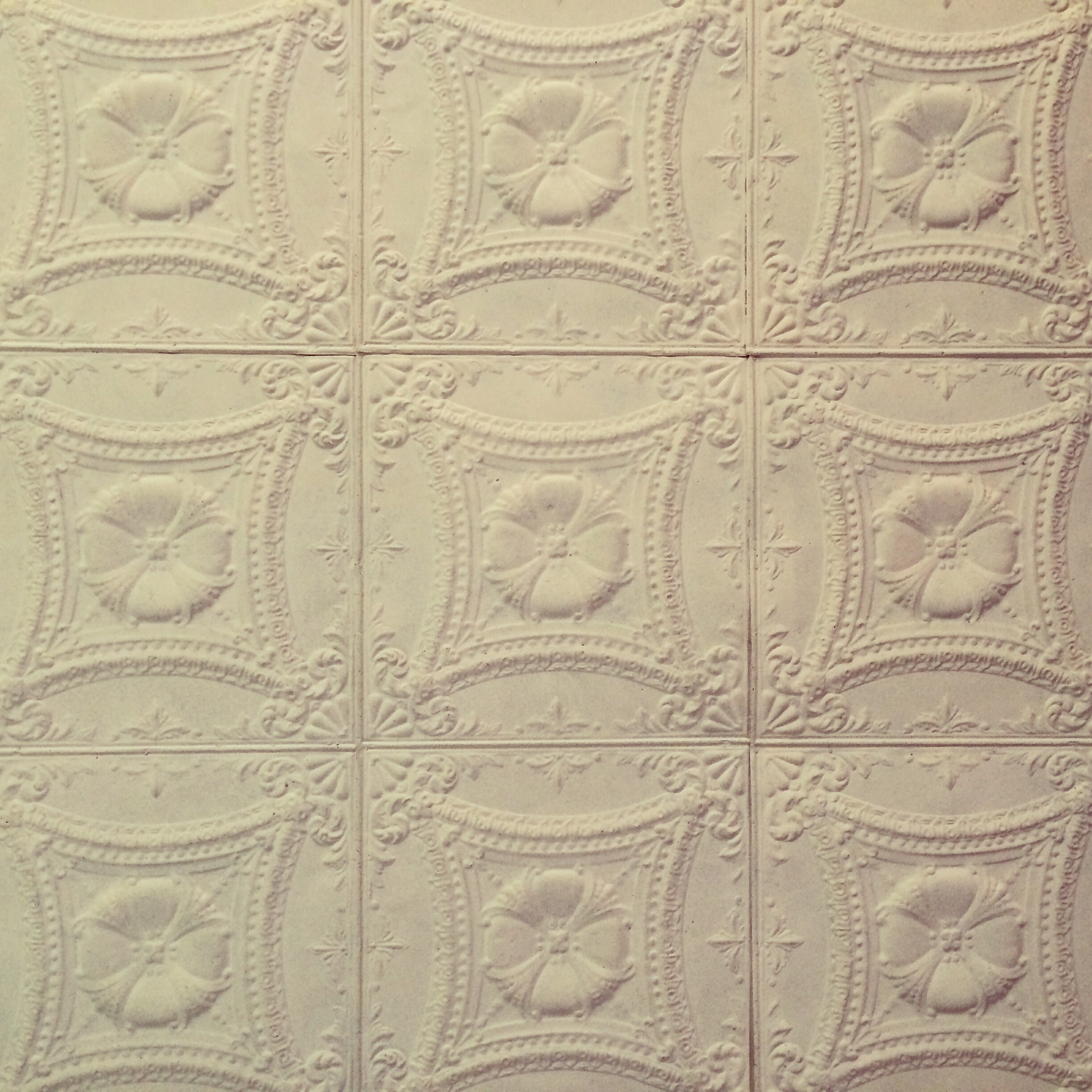
Detail of the pressed metal panels of the church's tin ceiling

The church's interior exhibits an open architectural plan. A plain wooden frame pulpit stands against the rear wall, underneath the middle window. The church's floor consists of pine boards installed during the church's 1968 restoration.

The church's ceiling, measuring approximately 15 feet (4.6 m) in height, is clad in pressed metal panels. A small opening allows for access to the church's attic. The unadorned window wells measure approximately 1 foot (0.30 m). The interior walls are covered in plasterboard, which remains unfinished.

The church's small wood-burning stove originally occupied the center of the sanctuary but was moved to the church's north wall in later years. It continues to serve as the church's sole source of heat.

Several of the church's pews date from 1857 and remain in use. The pews, quite simple in form, have a "minimalist appearance". Each pew consists of a long wooden plank that serves as the seat, with a thin rail supported by three spindles as the backrest. The pews are supported by three arched supports joined to the seat by a mortise and tenon joint and reinforced with nails. The newer pews exhibit identical design elements but are constructed with modern nails and timber. Though most of the pews are arranged against the church's west elevation with a center aisle, two are along the north elevation and four are along the south elevation. The pulpit is situated at the east elevation. There is an upright piano in the northeastern corner of the church.

== Cemetery ==
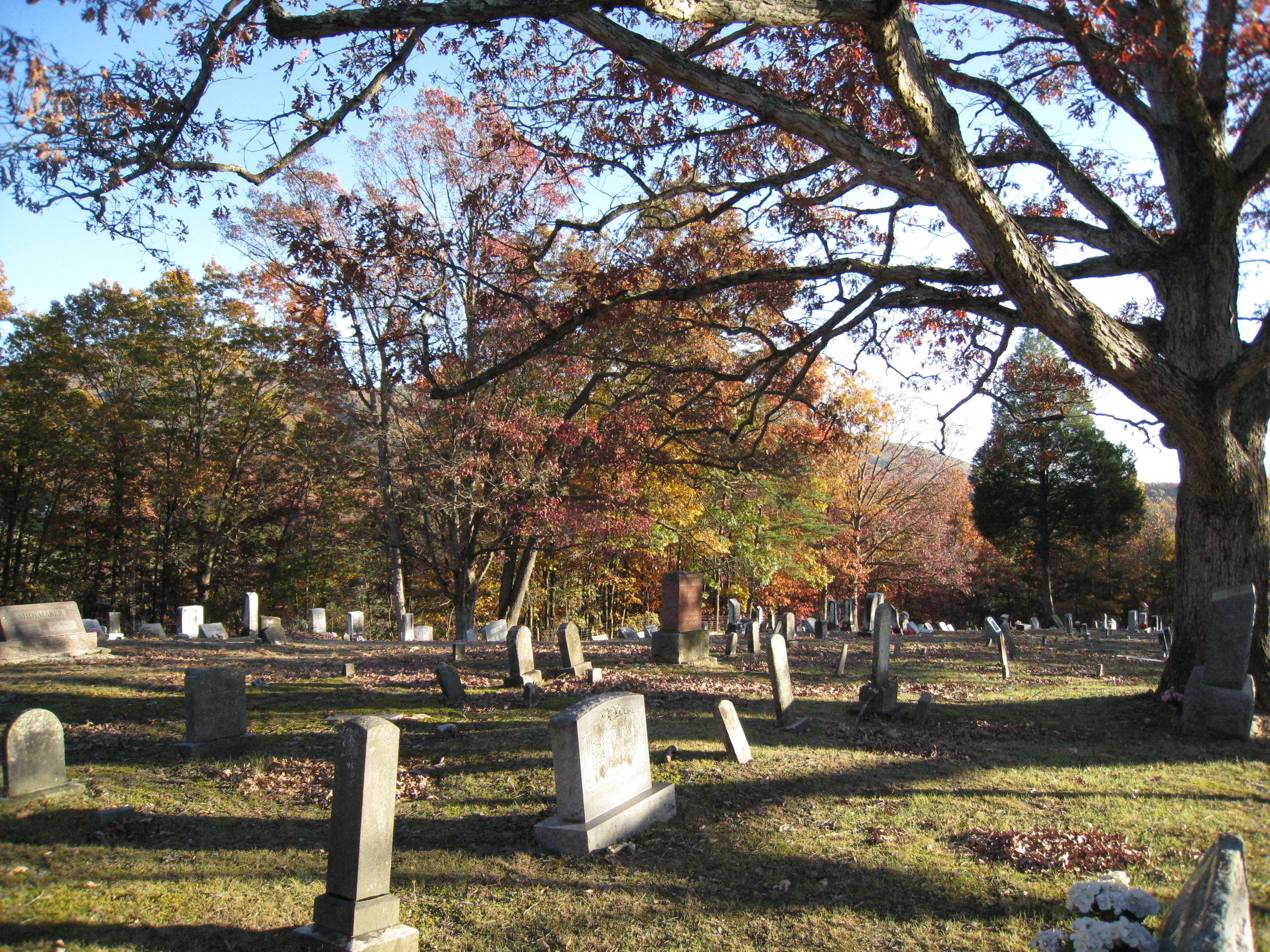
The southwestern area of the cemetery adjoining Old Pine Church. The large oak tree overhanging the cemetery is located to the right.

Old Pine Church is surrounded on three sides by a cemetery containing approximately 200 interments, the oldest section of which is located to the immediate east and south of the church building. The earliest remaining gravestone dates from 1834, but several unmarked interment sites in the surrounding cemetery may date from as early as 1759. The church's sign along U.S. Route 220 erroneously lists the date of the cemetery's oldest interment sites as 1792.

The cemetery's headstones are oriented both to the east and to the west. The majority are simple in design, inscribed with birth and death dates, and consist of a combination of rounded, arched stones, rectangular stones, and pyramidal-shaped obelisks that appear to be cut from limestone. In the cemetery's southern section are several small rectangular stones that probably serve as footstones. Beginning around 1950, the gravestones erected in the cemetery became more intricate with polished granite surfaces lying atop rough-cut stone foundations.

Old Pine Church's cemetery is surrounded by several mature trees, with a large oak tree overhanging the southwestern area of the cemetery. Outside of the National Register of Historic Places boundary to the northwest of Old Pine Church lies a second parcel of land acquired around 1950 for additional burials. The cemetery is enclosed by a chicken wire fence supported by wooden posts, with a large gate to the north of the church which allows machinery access into the cemetery.

== See also ==
- List of historic sites in Hampshire County, West Virginia
- National Register of Historic Places listings in Hampshire County, West Virginia

== Bibliography ==
- Bittinger, Emmert F. (1990). Allegheny Passage: Churches and Families, West Marva District, Church of the Brethren, 1752–1990. Camden, Maine: Penobscot Press. ISBN 978-0-929539-66-9. OCLC 21495617. Archived from the original on July 2, 2014 – via Google Books.
- Brannon, Selden W., ed. (1976). Historic Hampshire: A Symposium of Hampshire County and Its People, Past and Present. Parsons, West Virginia: McClain Printing Company. ISBN 978-0-87012-236-1. OCLC 3121468.
- Brethren Encyclopedia, Inc. (1983). The Brethren Encyclopedia, Volume 2. Philadelphia: Brethren Encyclopedia, Inc. ISBN 9780936693040. OCLC 598050261. Archived from the original on July 2, 2014 – via Google Books.
- Coleman, Roy V. (1951). Liberty and Property. New York City: Scribner. OCLC 1020487 – via Internet Archive.
- Maxwell, Hu; Swisher, Howard Llewellyn (1897). History of Hampshire County, West Virginia From Its Earliest Settlement to the Present. Morgantown, West Virginia: A. Brown Boughner, Printer. OCLC 680931891. OL 23304577M.
- Melton, J. Gordon (2005). Encyclopedia of Protestantism. New York City: Infobase Publishing. ISBN 978-0-8160-6983-5. OCLC 69873856. Archived from the original on June 10, 2016 – via Google Books.
- Munske, Roberta R.; Kerns, Wilmer L., eds. (2004). Hampshire County, West Virginia, 1754–2004. Romney, West Virginia: The Hampshire County 250th Anniversary Committee. ISBN 978-0-9715738-2-6. OCLC 55983178.
- Pitts, Phillip R.; Harding, James E. (October 27, 1976). National Register of Historic Places Registration Form: Wilson-Wodrow-Mytinger House (PDF). United States Department of the Interior, National Park Service. Archived from the original (PDF) on October 16, 2015.
- Rice, Otis K. (2015). The Allegheny Frontier: West Virginia Beginnings, 1730–1830. Lexington, Kentucky: University Press of Kentucky. ISBN 978-0-8131-6438-0. OCLC 900345296. Archived from the original on May 27, 2016 – via Google Books.
- Rose, Cornelia Bruère (1976). Arlington County, Virginia: A History. Arlington County, Virginia: Arlington Historical Society. OCLC 2401541. Archived from the original on April 2, 2016 – via Google Books.
- Scaffidi, Sandra (May 15, 2012). National Register of Historic Places Registration Form: Old Pine Church (PDF). United States Department of the Interior, National Park Service. Archived from the original (PDF) on October 16, 2015.
- William and Mary Quarterly (April 1898). "The Northern Neck of Virginia". William and Mary Quarterly. 6 (4): 222–226. doi:10.2307/1915885. ISSN 0043-5597. JSTOR 1915885. OCLC 1607858.
