= Valley View Island =

Location in the US

- Location within Romney, West Virginia Location within Eastern Panhandle of West Virginia Location within West Virginia Location within the United States

Geography
- Location: South Branch Potomac River, West Virginia
- Coordinates: 39.348742°N 78.765260°W

Administration
- United States

Valley View Island is an island bar on the South Branch Potomac River near Romney in the U.S. state of West Virginia. The island is formed at the confluence of the South Branch Potomac River with Sulphur Spring Run at the foot of Romney's Yellow Banks and takes its name from nearby Valley View Farm, an 1855 Antebellum plantation house. Valley View Island is currently private property.

== See also ==
- List of islands of West Virginia
