= Stewart Iron Works =

Coordinates: 39.0244°N 84.5899°W

- Type: Corporation
- Industry: Ironworks
- Founded: 1862
- Headquarters: Erlanger, Kentucky, United States
- Key people: Richard C. Stewart, Sr. (founder); Richard C. Stewart, Jr.; Wallace A. Stewart; John Hunnicutt; Joseph Milburn; Mike Huseman
- Products: Fencing, Railing, Gates
- Number of employees: 42 (2019)
- Parent: Huseman Group
- Website: stewartironworks.com

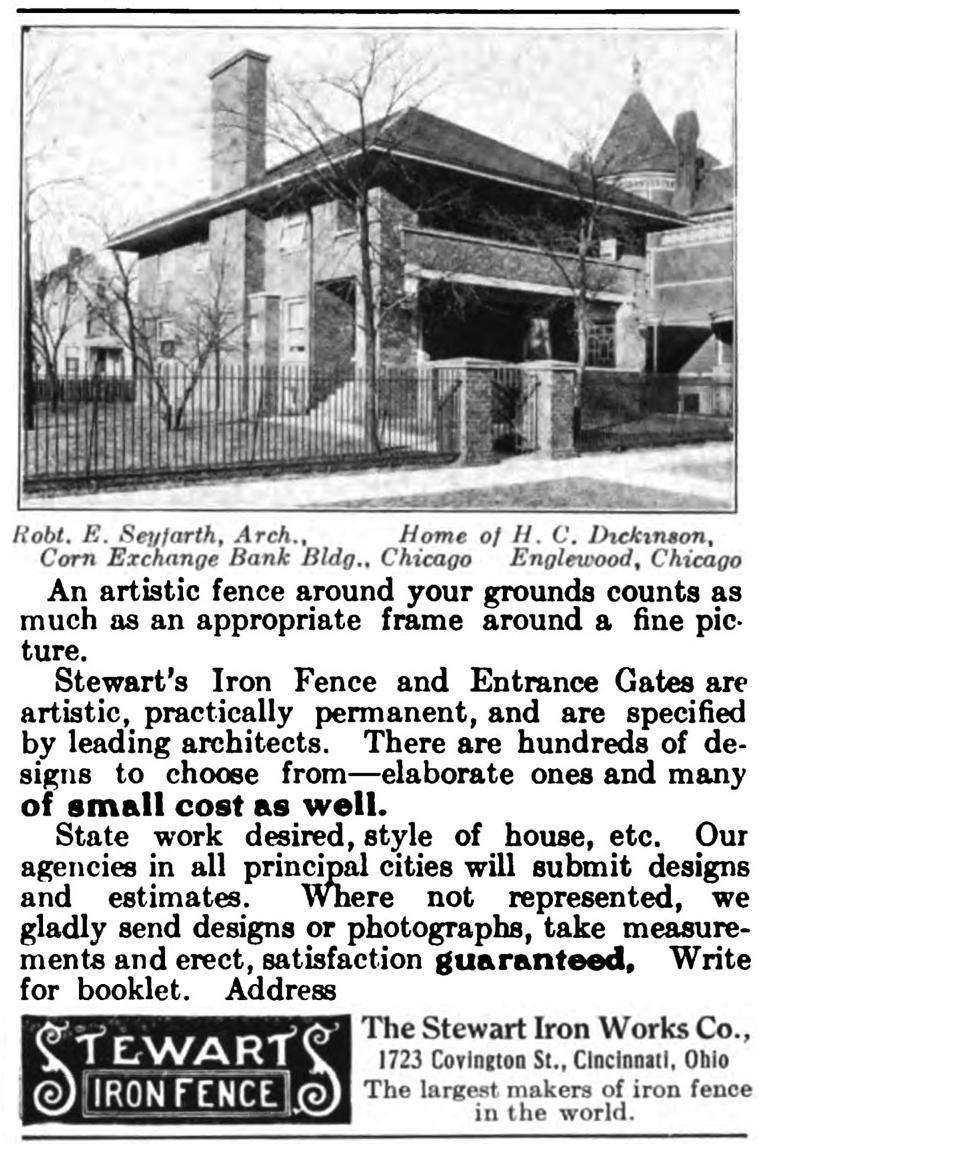
An advertisement for the Stewart Iron Works Co. that appeared in the February 1909 edition of House and Garden featuring one of the company's fences installed in front of a home designed by the Chicago architect Robert Seyfarth.

Stewart Iron Works is an American ironworks plant in Erlanger, Kentucky. It is one of the region's oldest manufacturing firms and at its peak was the largest iron fence maker in the world. Stewart's is the second-oldest iron company in continuous operation in the United States. Based at 30 Kenton Lands Rd, its first location was at 8th & Madison in Covington, Kentucky. It is currently owned by the HGC Group of Companies but was originally established by the Scottish American Stewart family. The company was founded in 1862 and incorporated in 1910.

Manufacturing materials for prison construction, Stewart marketed to jails using salesmen who were all engineers. As an iron supplier to many major American institutions, Stewart's supplied gates and fences for the Panama Canal, the British Embassy in Washington, D.C., the Taft Museum, as well as the entrance gates to the White House, the Rutherford B. Hayes Presidential Center, and the U.S. House of Representatives, The steel cell blocks manufactured in the 1930s for Alcatraz Federal Penitentiary and Sing Sing were made by Stewart. At one time, the company supplied the majority of the U.S.'s cemetery fences and gates.

== History ==
In 1862, Richard C. Stewart (1829–1906) opened a shop in Covington which built iron fences; it was located on 8th Street near Madison Avenue. Two of his sons, Richard Jr. and Wallace began a similar business in Wichita, Kansas, in 1886. They returned to Covington nine years later, and joined their father's business, along with a third brother. They opened a bridge works plant in Cincinnati, Ohio, and a related service, called Stewart Jail Works. Needing more space, the brothers built a new plant on 8 acres (3.2 ha) near Madison Avenue and 17th Streets in 1903. The firm had four buildings to house its five divisions, the jail cell division, a truck division, wrought iron furniture and fence division, and a chain-link fence division. A branch in Cincinnati operated during the period of 1903 through 1915. The company won the grand prize and gold medal in construction at the 1904 World's Fair in St. Louis, Missouri. By 1915, the company had 600 employees. Stewart began producing trucks in 1912, which placed the company in debt by the end of the 1920s. During World War I, it was an important supplier of trucks, at its peak producing 100 for the U.S. Army in 1918, but ceased truck manufacturing a decade later.

Prison contracts eased the financial burdens in the 1930s, and in 1936, brother Richard retired. Military contracts kept Stewart busy in the 1940s. Near bankruptcy by the mid-1950s, John Hunnicutt served as president. After retiring in 1964, Hunnicutt was replaced by Joseph Milburn. In the mid-1960s, Stewart was acquired by Pott Industries (St. Louis) and merged with Decatur Iron and Steel. After Milburn purchased Stewart's fence division from Pott Industries, he moved the company in 1983 to Erlanger, Kentucky. With the Erlanger plant reaching capacity by 1987, Milburn moved the operations to the Covington plant's 60,000 square feet (5,600 m^{2}) building. Milburn's sons and Mark Rottinghaus owned Stewart Iron Works for over a decade. It is still in business today.

== Manufactured products ==
The Stewart Iron Fence Company's manufactured range of products, made to order on the basis of quotations submitted by the company, were: "Iron Fence and Entrance Gates, Iron Reservoir Vases, Iron and Wire setters, Stable fittings, Lamps, Grills, Office Partitions, Window Guards, general Ornamental Iron Works, Jail and Prison security Iron Works and Steel Grills". Quality of the products was ensured with the latest technological innovations in machinery and the specifications of the highest quality of materials used for manufacture of the products. Skilled workmen and quality control staff were maintained to ensure a quality product.

The steel components involved in the manufacture of fences were: stand posts at the end of each line, base plates for the foundation, brazing for stability, adjustable central supports in each long panel and components for connectivity. A coat of special graphite paint was mandatory; however, the color of paint could be changed to suit the client's choice. The fences could also be galvanized to special order. The adjustable features which provided the stability to the fence were a specialty of Stewart's. "Three Ribbed Steel Channel Fence Rail" was patented manufacture of Stewart's.

A recent manufacturing venture of the company is the Scioto Mile which was installed as a notable landmark in the river front of downtown Columbus, Ohio. The special feature of this project is the "blossom" fountain system which has 96 individual stainless tubes fitted over an oval shaped base plate. The tubes were fitted with nozzles to make up the fountains. The project as a whole was scheduled to mark the city's bicentennial celebration in 2012.

In 2019, Cincinnati, Ohio based Huseman Group acquired Stewart Iron Works. The company focus remains in the wrought iron and architectural metal industry. It continues to build handmade American products for landmarks, residences, parks, and attractions across the United States.
