= Gablefront house =

Vernacular house type

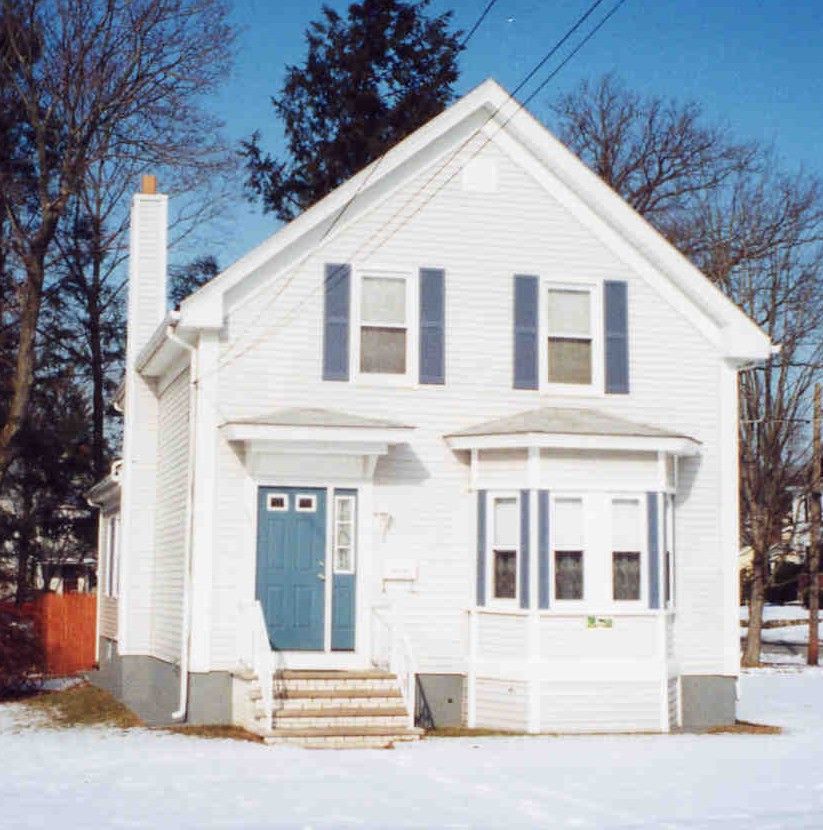
A gablefront house with a bay window

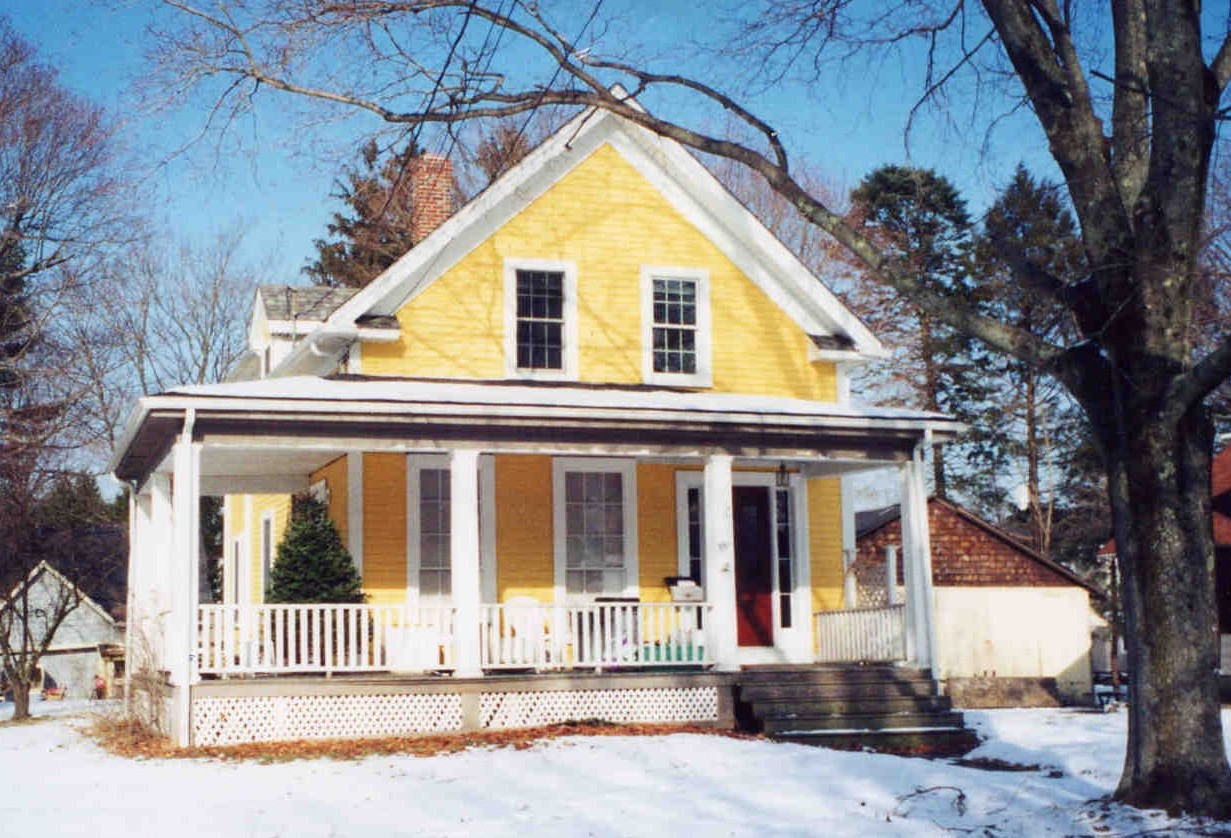
A gablefront house with a veranda porch

A gablefront house, also called a gable-front house or front-gable house, is a vernacular (or "folk") house type in which the gable is facing the street or entrance side of the house. They were built in large numbers throughout the United States primarily between the early 19th century and 1920.

A gablefront cottage is a smaller variant, consisting of either a single story or a story and a half. They were typically used as working-class dwellings, most being rather simple in design. However, they may contain some ornamentation such as brackets around the doorways or roof line. Many gablefront houses contain front porches.

== History ==
The gablefront house developed after 1825 and coincided with the popularity of the American Greek Revival style, which placed emphasis on the gable-end of the house in the form of a pediment; often associated with Greek temples.

The gablefront house allows the narrow part of the house to face the street, usually on a rectangular lot. The gablefront house became a uniquely American folk house type. The gablefront house cropped up in styles ranging from Greek Revival, to Gothic Revival, to Queen Anne, to a simpler vernacular style home. The gablefront house form remained popular into the early 20th century.

== Variants ==
=== Gabled ell ===
One variation of the gablefront house is the gabled ell. The gabled ell incorporated a side gable, which was typically added-on to the house. The add-on was usually in order to obtain additional space, light and cross-ventilation.

=== T-plan ===
Another variation of this house form is the T-plan house. The T-plan house consists of gable-ends on either side of the front-facing main gable.

== See also ==
- List of house types
- List of house styles
- Upright and Wing
