= Hickory Grove (Romney, West Virginia) =

Historic house in West Virginia, United States

- U.S. National Register of Historic Places
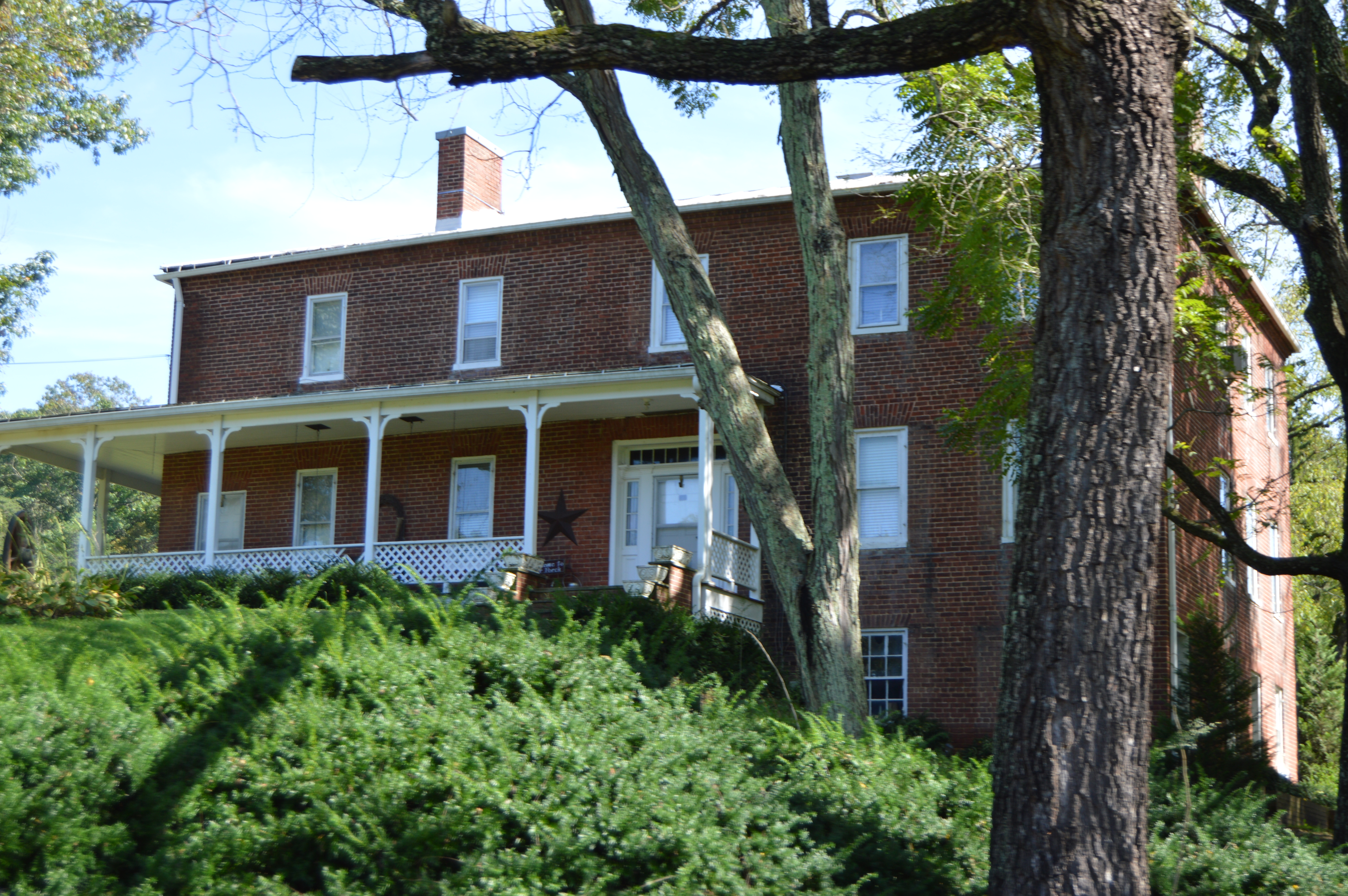
- Front of the house

- Location within Eastern Panhandle of West Virginia Location within West Virginia Location within the United States
- Location: County Route 8, 1 mile (1.6 km) south of US 50, near Romney, West Virginia
- Coordinates: 39°19′29″N 78°46′50″W
- Area: 1.41 acres (0.57 ha)
- Built: 1849, 1892
- Built by: James A. Adam and William B. Stump
- Architectural style: Greek Revival
- NRHP reference No.: 11000556
- Added to NRHP: August 18, 2011

Hickory Grove is a historic home located near Romney, Hampshire County, West Virginia. It was built in 1849, and is a three-story, red brick dwelling. It sits on a stone foundation and has a hipped, standing-seam metal roof with four large brick chimneys. The front facade features a Greek Revival style trabeated entrance. The north section was built in 1892, and replaced an earlier log structure.

It was listed on the National Register of Historic Places in 2012.
