= Springfield Brick House =

Historic house in West Virginia, United States

- U.S. National Register of Historic Places
- Location within Eastern Panhandle of West Virginia Location within West Virginia Location within the United States
- Location: 12 Market St., Springfield, West Virginia
- Coordinates: 39°27′04″N 78°41′42″W
- Area: 0.5 acres (0.20 ha)
- Built: c. 1855
- Architectural style: Georgian, Greek Revival
- NRHP reference No.: 12001141
- Added to NRHP: January 2, 2013

Springfield Brick House, also known as Frenchwood, is a historic home located at Springfield, Hampshire County, West Virginia. It was built about 1855 and is a two-story, five-bay, orange-red brick building with an L-shaped plan. It features a three-bay front porch with a hipped roof supported by Doric order columns. The house has a blend of Georgian and Greek Revival design elements. Also on the property is a contributing well.

It was listed on the National Register of Historic Places in 2013.
