= List of rail trails in New York =

This list of rail trails in New York lists former railroad rights-of-way in New York that have been converted to rail trails for public use. Many of these rail trails are also part of the statewide Empire State Trail network, which officially opened Jan. 1, 2021.

== Trails ==
- *trail that is part of the Empire State Trail network

Trail name	Length	Location	Original Rail Road	Opening date
Adirondack Rail Trail	34 miles (55 km)	Essex and Franklin counties	New York Central Railroad	December 1, 2023
Akron Clarence Trail	12 miles (19 km)	Erie County	West Shore and Buffalo Railroad	2004
Albany County Helderberg-Hudson Rail Trail	9.8 miles (15.8 km)	Albany County	Albany and Susquehanna Railroad (Delaware and Hudson Railway)	2011
Albany-Hudson Electric Trail*	36 miles	Rensselaer and Columbia counties	Albany and Hudson Electric Railway (Albany Southern Railroad)	2020
Allegheny River Valley Trail	5.6 miles (9.0 km)	Allegany and Cattaraugus counties	Western New York and Pennsylvania Railway (Pennsylvania Railroad)	1998
Andes Rail Trail	1 mile (1.6 km) plus 2 miles (3.2 km) Bullet Hole Spur	Andes, Delaware County	Delaware and Northern Railroad	June 2012
Ashokan Rail Trail	11.5 miles (18.5 km)	Ulster County	Ulster and Delaware Railroad	October 18, 2019
Auburn Trail	12 miles (19 km) from Powder Mills Park through Victor to Canandaigua Farmington Town Line Rd	Ontario County	Auburn and Rochester Railroad	1993
Ballston Bike Path	3.5 miles (5.6 km)	Saratoga County	Schenectady Railway Company	1994
Black Diamond Trail	8 miles (13 km) Taughannock Falls State Park to Ithaca, New York	Tompkins County	Lehigh Valley Railroad	2016
Black River Recreational Trail	3.5 miles (5.6 km)	Jefferson County	New York Central Railroad	
Bog Meadow Brook	2 miles (3.2 km)	Saratoga County	?	
Canalway Trail*	?	?	Mostly towpath trails, but parts, like the Mohawk-Hudson Trail (below), use former rail beds.	1973
Catharine Valley	12.9 miles (20.8 km)	Chemung and Schuyler Counties	Chemung Railroad (Pennsylvania Railroad)	2002
Cato–Fair Haven Trail	12.7 miles (20.4 km)	Cayuga County	Lehigh Valley Railroad (Auburn Branch)	
Catskill Scenic Trail	26 miles (42 km) from Bloomville to Roxbury	Delaware County	Ulster and Delaware Railroad	1990
Cayuga–Seneca Canal Trail	6.7 miles (10.8 km) from Geneva to Waterloo	Seneca County	?	
Chautauqua Alison Wells Ney Trail	?	Chautauqua County	?	
Chautauqua Brocton Area Recreational Trail	2 miles (3.2 km)	Chautauqua County	?	
Chautauqua Laurie A. Baer Trail	1.1 miles (1.8 km)	Chautauqua County	?	
Chautauqua Nadine and Paul Webb Trail	1 mile (1.6 km)	Chautauqua County	?	
Chautauqua Nancy B. Diggs Trail	1.5 miles (2.4 km)	Chautauqua County	?	
Chautauqua Ralph C. Sheldon Jr. Trail	4.5 miles (7.2 km)	Chautauqua County	?	
Chautauqua Village of Mayville Trail	1.5 miles (2.4 km)	Chautauqua County	?	
Cheektowaga Rails to Trails	?	Erie County	Lehigh Valley Railroad	2009
Chittenango Gorge Trail	?	Cazenovia	?	
Corkscrew Rail Traill	3 miles	Stephentown	Rutland Railroad	June 6, 2015
Corning Bike Path	3.3 miles (5.3 km) Corning-Painted Post Middle School to Princeton Avenue, Corning, New York	Steuben County	Delaware, Lackawanna and Western Railroad	
DnH Canal Heritage Corridor North	?	?	?	
DnH Canal Heritage Corridor South	?	?	?	
Dutchess Rail Trail*	13 miles (21 km)	Dutchess County	Central New England Railway	2007
Electric Trolley Trail, Pittsford	1.8 miles (2.9 km) Shoen Place to Marsh Road	Pittsford, Monroe County	Rochester & Eastern Rapid Railway (interurban, aka the Orange Line)	
Erie Cattaraugus Rail Trail		East Aurora	Buffalo and Pittsburgh Railroad	2023
Fonda, Johnstown, and Gloversville Rail Trail	?	Fulton County	Fonda, Johnstown, and Gloversville Railroad	2007
Genesee Valley Greenway	59 miles (95 km) Jefferson Road Rt. 252 to Letchworth State Park and Sonyea, New York. Then segments and gaps to Cuba, New York	Monroe, Livingston, and Allegany Counties	Genesee Valley Rail Road (Pennsylvania Railroad)	1992
Gorge Trail	2.2 miles (3.5 km)	Chittenango Falls State Park, Madison County	Lehigh Valley Railroad (Elmira and Cortland Branch)	
Greater Jamestown Riverwalk	?	Chautauqua County	Erie Railroad (Only the portion north of downtown Jamestown along the Chadakoin River)	
Harlem Valley Rail Trail	?	Dutchess and Columbia Counties	New York and Harlem Railroad (New York Central Railroad)	1996
High Line	1.4 miles (2.3 km) Gansevoort Street to 34th Street	Manhattan	New York Central Railroad	2009
Hojack Trail Cayuga	?	Cayuga County	Lake Ontario Shore Railroad (the Hojack Line)	
Hojack Trail Hamlin	14 miles (23 km) Wiler Road to East Kent Road	Monroe County	Lake Ontario Shore Railroad (the Hojack Line)	
Hojack Trail Hilton	2.8 miles (4.5 km) Salmon Creek Park to North Greece Road	Monroe County	Lake Ontario Shore Railroad (the Hojack Line)	
Hojack Trail Hannibal	6.6 miles (10.6 km) Viele Rd. to Martville Rd.	Wayne County	Lake Ontario Shore Railroad (the Hojack Line)	
Hojack Trail Webster	3.5 miles (5.6 km) Vosburg Rd. to Orchard Park	Webster, Monroe County	Lake Ontario Shore Railroad (the Hojack Line)	1997
Huckleberry Multi-Use Trail	?	Tannersville, New York	Ulster and Delaware Railroad	
Hudson Valley Rail Trail*	4 miles (6.4 km)	Lloyd, Ulster County	Central New England and Western Railroad	1997
Jim Schug Trail	4.2 miles (6.8 km)	Dryden, Tompkins County	Lehigh Valley Railroad	
John Kieran Nature Trail	?	Van Cortlandt Park, The Bronx	New York and Putnam Railroad (New York Central Railroad)	
Joseph B. Clarke Rail Trail	3.8 miles (6.1 km)	Rockland County	Northern Railroad of New Jersey (Erie Railroad)	1994
Kaaterskill Rail Trail	Currently 1.5 miles (2.4 km). The goal is to connect the Village of Hunter to North-South Lake	Greene County	Ulster and Delaware Railroad	
Kennedy Rail Trail	?	Westchester and Putnam Counties	New York and Mahopac Railroad (New York Central Railroad)	
Keuka Outlet Trail	6.8 miles (10.9 km)	Yates County	Fall Brook Railroad (New York Central Railroad)	July 4, 1984
Kings Park Hike and Bike Trail	?	Kings Park, Suffolk County	Long Island Rail Road, Kings Park State Hospital spur	August 2014
Kingston Point Rail Trail*	1.2 miles (1.9 km), extension planned	Kingston, Ulster County	?	
Lehigh Valley Trail (Black Diamond)	16.2 miles (26.1 km) W. River Rd, Genesee Valley Greenway, Auburn Trail to NY 251	Monroe County and Ontario County	Lehigh Valley Railroad	2004
Lehigh Memory Trail	0.5 miles	Williamsville, Erie County	Depew and Tonawanda Railroad (Lehigh Valley Railroad)	1990
Link Trail	?	Chittenango Falls State Park, Madison County	?	
Long Pond Greenbelt	?	Bridgehampton to Sag Harbor, Suffolk County	Long Island Rail Road, Sag Harbor Branch	
Maple City Trail	?	Ogdensburg and St. Lawrence County	?	
Maybrook Trailway*	28.2 miles	Dutchess and Putnam Counties.	Beacon Line (Metro-North Railroad / New York and New England Railroad) from Hopewell Junction to Brewster	January 4, 2021
Mohawk Hudson Bike/Hike Trail* (part of Canalway Trail System)	86, with gaps in Watervliet, Colonie and Pattersonville	Schenectady and Albany Counties.	Schenectady and Troy Railroad (New York Central Railroad) from Cohoes to Schenectady. Towpath trail from there west.	1977
Newstead Trail	?	Erie County	West Shore and Buffalo Railroad	
North County Trailway*	22.1 miles (35.6 km)	Westchester County	New York and Putnam Railroad (New York Central Railroad)	1981
North Shore Rail Trail	10.4 miles	Port Jefferson Station to Wading River, Suffolk County	Long Island Rail Road, Wading River Extension	June 10, 2022
Northport Rail Trail	0.65 miles (1.05 km)	Suffolk County	Long Island Rail Road, Northport Branch	2008
Nyack Rail Trail	?	Rockland County	New York and Erie Railroad (Erie Railroad)	
Ontario Pathways Trail (Canandaigua to Stanley)	11 miles (18 km) East Street Canandaigua to Flint Road	Ontario County	Northern Central (Pennsylvania Railroad)	1992
Ontario Pathways Trail (Stanley to Phelps)	8.7 miles (14.0 km)	Ontario County	Pennsylvania Railroad	
Ontario and Western Rail Trail (Kingston to Ellenville)	35 miles (56 km)	Ulster County	New York, Ontario and Western Railway	
Orange Heritage Trailway	19.5 miles (31.4 km)	Orange County	Erie Railroad	1996
Oswego Recreational Trail	?	Oswego County	New York, Ontario and Western Railway	1979
Pat McGee Trail	12.2 miles (19.6 km)	Cattaraugus County	Erie Railroad	1987
Pendleton Rail Trail		Pendleton	Erie Railroad	2006-2007
Portage Trail	?	?	?	
Putnam County Trailway*	12	Putnam County	New York and Putnam Railroad (New York Central Railroad)	
Railroad Run	?	Saratoga County	?	
Rivergate Trail	?	?	?	
Rochester, Syracuse and Eastern Trolley Trail	4.3 miles (6.9 km)	Monroe county	Rochester, Syracuse and Eastern Rapid Railroad	
Rutland Trail	21.2 miles (34.1 km) from Norwood to Moira	St. Lawrence and Franklin counties	Rutland Railroad	
Sodus Point to Wallington Trail	2.3 miles (3.7 km)	Wayne County	?	
South County Trailway*	14.1 miles (22.7 km)	Westchester County	New York and Putnam Railroad (New York Central Railroad)	August 1999
South Hill Recreation Way	4.6 miles (7.4 km)	Tompkins County	Ithaca and Owego Railroad (Delaware, Lackawanna and Western Railroad)	1988
Spring Run Trail	?	?	?	
Stillwater Multi-Use Trail*	?	Stillwater	Boston and Maine Railroad	
Tarrytown Lakes Extension	2.5 miles (4.0 km)	Westchester County	New York and Putnam Railroad (New York Central Railroad)	
Tonawanda Rails to Trails	?	Tonawanda	Erie Railroad	August 11, 2016
Town of Edwards Nature Trail	?	St. Lawrence County	Gouverneur and Oswegatchie Railroad (New York Central Railroad)	
Uncle Sam Bikeway	3 miles (4.8 km)	Troy	Boston and Maine Railroad	1981
Vestal Rail Trail	2.2 miles (3.5 km)	Broome County	Delaware, Lackawanna and Western Railroad	2002
Walden–Wallkill Rail Trail	3.22 miles (5.18 km)	Orange and Ulster Counties	Wallkill Valley Railroad (New York Central Railroad)	April, 1991
Walkway over the Hudson* (Poughkeepsie Bridge)	1.28 miles (2.06 km)	Poughkeepsie and Highland	The Maybrook Railroad Line, Central New England Railway (CNE), New York, New Haven & Hartford Railroad (NH), Penn Central (PC) and Conrail, et al.	2009
Wallkill Valley Rail Trail*	23.7 miles (38.1 km)	Ulster County	Wallkill Valley Railroad (New York Central Railroad)	1993
Warren County Bikeway	9.4 miles (15.1 km) from Glens Falls to Lake George	Warren County	Delaware and Hudson Railroad	1979 as first rail trail in New York state
Zim Smith Trail	12 miles (19 km)	Saratoga County	Rensselaer & Saratoga Railroad (Delaware and Hudson Railroad)	October 31, 2010

== See also ==
- List of trails in New York, for notable non-rail trails
