= List of trails in New York =

The State of New York has a large network of multi-use paths, rail trails, hiking trails, and other facilities. Many are short, local paths, but many are of statewide or regional significance. In order to be added to this list, a trail must be located in New York and have and its own article, or a dedicated section in an article.

== Long-distance hiking trails ==
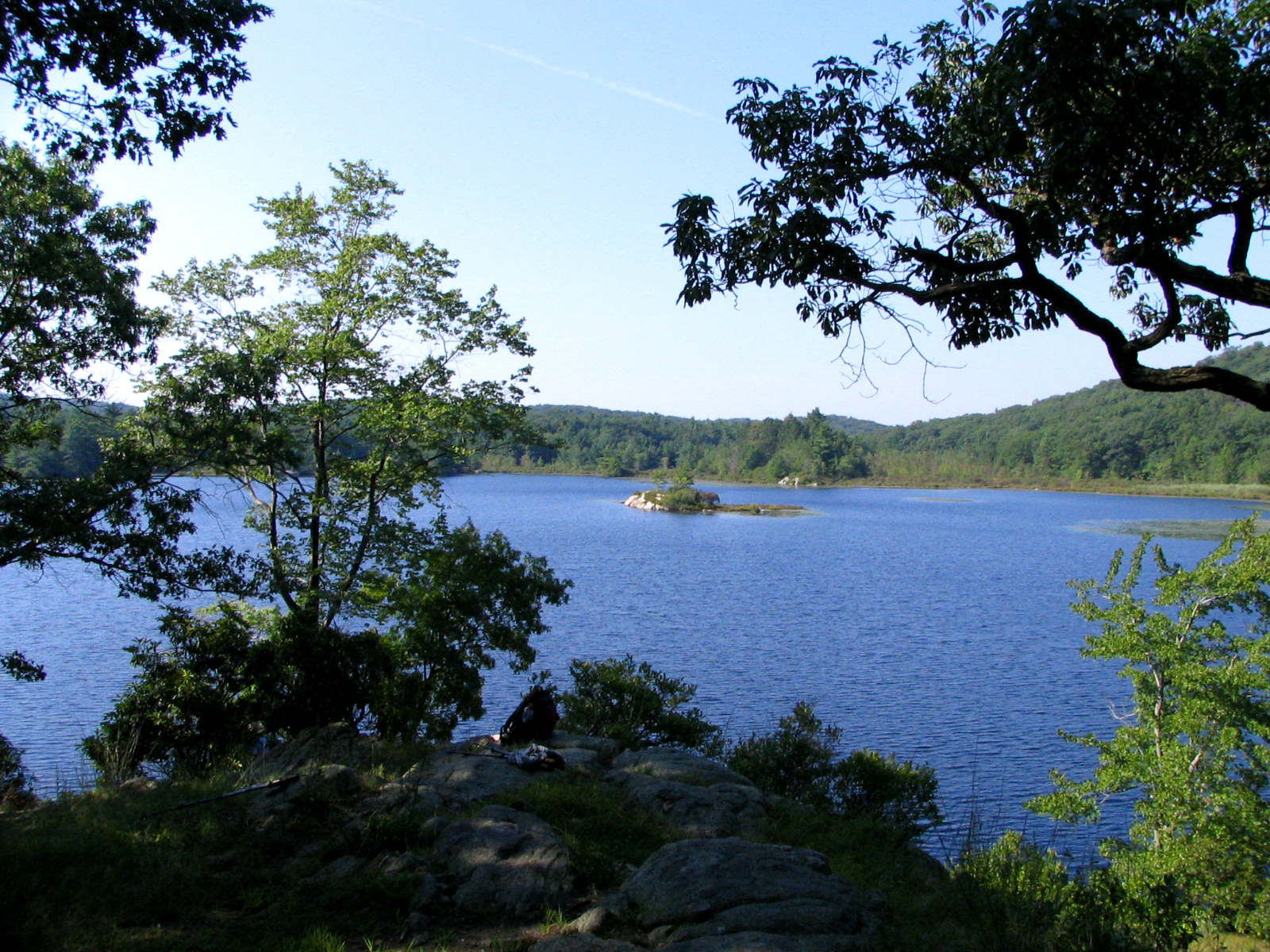
A part of the Appalachian Trail, Harriman State Park

- Appalachian Trail
- Empire State Trail
- Finger Lakes Trail
- Long Path
- Northville-Placid Trail
- Taconic Crest Trail
- Van Hoevenberg Trail
- The Escarpment Trail
- The Devils Path

== Rail trails ==
- Albany County Rail Trail
- Allegheny River Valley Trail
- Auburn Trail
- Canalway Trail
- Cato–Fair Haven Trail
- Catskill Scenic Trail
- Dutchess Rail Trail
- Genesee Valley Greenway
- Harlem Valley Rail Trail
- High Line
- Hojack Trail Cayuga
- Hojack Trail Webster
- Hudson Valley Rail Trail
- Kings Park Hike and Bike Trail
- Mohawk Hudson Bike/Hike Trail
- North County Trailway
- Orange Heritage Trailway
- Oswego Recreational Trail
- Poughkeepsie Bridge
- Putnam County Trailway
- Rutland Trail
- South County Trailway
- Walden–Wallkill Rail Trail
- Wallkill Valley Rail Trail
- Zim Smith Trail

== Other trails ==
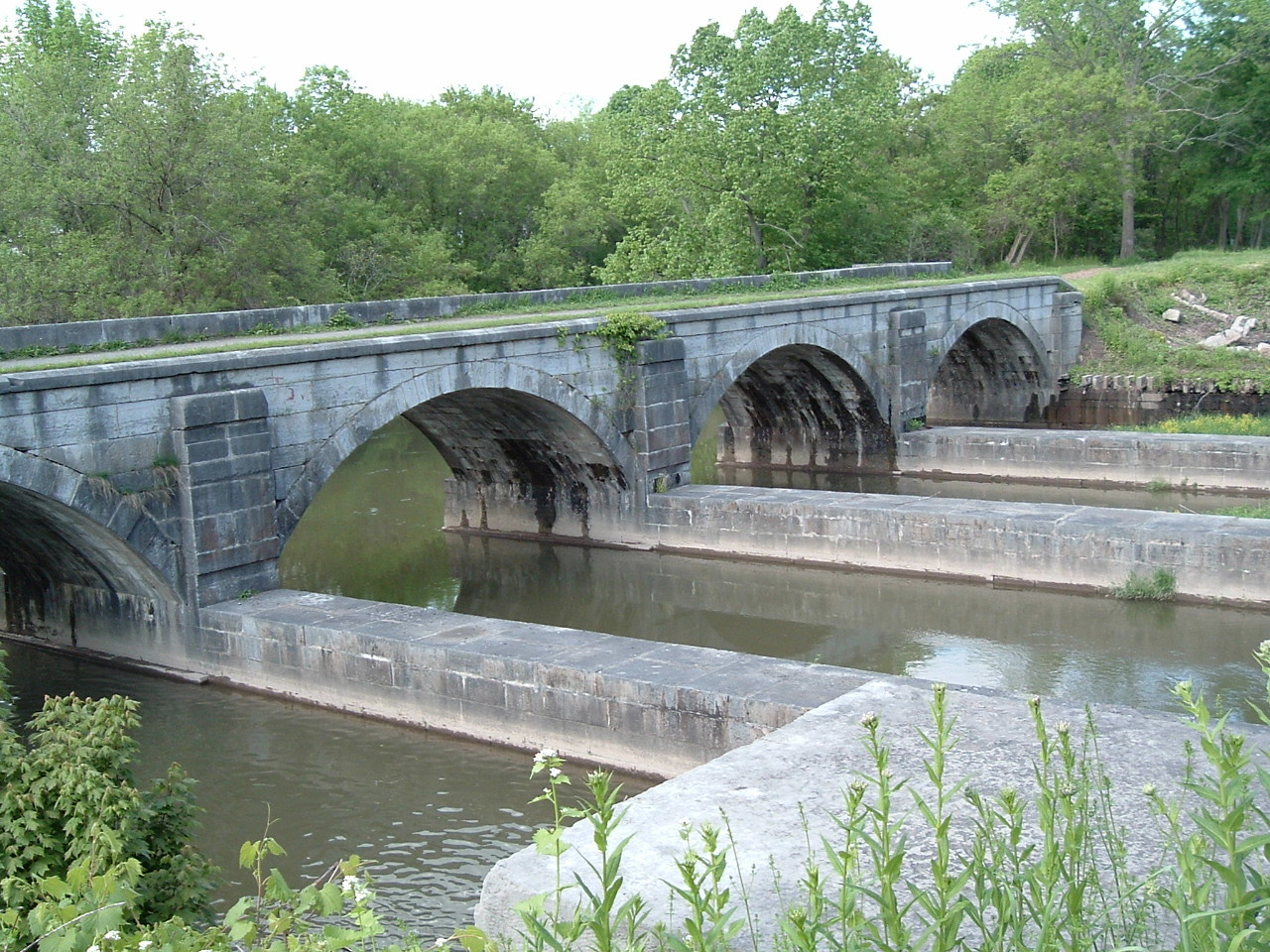
The Nine Mile Creek Aqueduct in the Camillus Erie Canal park. The arches now support a tow path trail.

Although many of the multi-use paths in New York are converted rail trails, there are some significant examples that were never railroads.

- List of trails on Long Island, New York
- Trails in Ithaca, New York
- Manhattan Waterfront Greenway
- Brooklyn-Queens Greenway
- Blue Disc Trail (Harriman State Park)
- Groff Creek
- New York State Canalway Trail
  - Erie Canal Trail
- Wilkinson Memorial Trail

=== Snowmobile trails ===
- List of snowmobile trails in New York
