= List of reporting marks: O =

Note: Marks ending in U are for container owners; marks ending in X are not common carriers; marks ending in Z are for trailers without flanged wheels. All other marks are of common-carrier railroads.

== O ==
- OACX - Central Transportation, Inc.
- OAKX - Oak Ridge Waste & Recycling
- OAR - Old Augusta Railroad
- OCCU - ATS Container Leasing SA
- OCCX - Occidental Chemical Company
- OCE - Oregon, California and Eastern Railway
- OCEU - Oceanex Inc.
- OCFX - Owens Corning Fiberglass
- OCLU - Overseas Containers, Ltd.
- OCNU - Ocean Lines, Inc.
- OCPX - Occidental Chemical Company; Oxy Vinyls
- OCR - Oklahoma Central Railroad
- OCRR - Ottawa Central Railway
- OCRX - Oil Creek Refining Company
- OCSU - Scripps Institute of Oceanography
- OCTL - Oil Creek and Titusville Lines
- OCTR - Octoraro Railway
- OCTX - Octel America, Inc.
- ODTX - Oil-Dri Corporation of America
- OERR - Oregon Eastern Railroad
- OEDX - Ohio Edison Company
- OERR - Oregon Eastern Railroad
- OERX - Southern California Railway Museum
- OFCX - Ortner Freight Car Company
- OFOX - Residco
- OFSX - Tucson Electric Power Company
- OGEE - Ogeechee Railway
- OGEX - Oklahoma Gas and Electric Company
- OGSX - Iowa Southern Utilities Company
- OHCR - Ohio Central Railroad
- OHFX - Fluor Daniel Fernald
- OHIC - Ohi-Rail Corporation
- OHIO - Ohio Terminal Railway
- OHKU - Ohka American, Inc.
- OHOX - United States Department of Energy (Ohio Field)
- OHPA - Ohio and Pennsylvania Railroad
- OHRY - Owego and Harford Railway
- OILX - GE Rail Services
- OJGX - Oscar J. Glover
- OJTX - Tauber Transportation Company
- OKAN - Okanagan Valley Railway (OmniTRAX)
- OKCE - Okarche Central Railway
- OKCX - Lone Star Industries
- OKKT - Oklahoma, Kansas and Texas Railroad; Union Pacific Railroad
- OLAU - Occidental Chemical Corporation
- OLB - Omaha, Lincoln and Beatrice Railway
- OLDX - Old Line Holding Company, Inc.
- OLGX - Ineos Oligomers USA, LLC
- OLLU - Ocean Leasing, Ltd.
- OLNX - Olin Corporation
- OLO - Ontario L'Orignal Railway
- OLYR - Olympic Railroad
- OLYU - Olympic Container Corporation
- OLYR - Olympic Railroad
- OLYX - Olympia Petroleum, Inc.
- OLYZ - Showa Line, Ltd.
- OMAX - Omaha Public Power District
- OMID - Ontario Midland Railroad
- OMLP - Ohio Midland Light and Power
- OMLX - OmniTRAX Leasing, Ltd.
- OMNX - Omnisource; Steel Dynamics.
- OMRX - Ozark Mountain Railcar
- OMSX - Ohio Mulch; J. T. Leasing, Inc.
- ON - Ottawa Northern Railroad
- ONCT - Ontario Central Railroad
- ONER - Ontario Eastern Railroad
- ONRR - Ohio and National Railway Company
- ONSX - Oglebay Norton Industrial Sands, Inc.
- ONT - Ontario Northland Railway
- ONTA - Ontario Northland Railway
- ONTX - On-Track Railcar Services, Inc.
- ONW - Oregon and Northwestern Railroad
- ONYX - American Colloid Company
- OOCZ - Orient Overseas Line, Inc.
- OOLU - OOCL
- OOOX - Osborne, Inc.
- OOUU - Orient Overseas Line, Inc.
- OPE - Oregon, Pacific and Eastern Railway
- OPIX - Equistar Chemicals
- OPPX - Omaha Public Power District
- OPR - Oregon Pacific Railroad
- OPSU - EMP
- OPSX - Public Service Company of Oklahoma
- OPT - Orange Port Terminal Railway
- OPX - Ohio Power Company
- OR - Owasco River Railway
- ORA - Ormet Railroad
- ORCU - BSL Transport
- OREX - Oregon Department of Agriculture
- OROX - United States Department of Energy (Oak Ridge Operations Office)
- ORR - Osage Railroad
- OSCZ - Intermodal Services, Inc.
- OSL - Oregon Short Line; Union Pacific Railroad
- OSRX - Ontario Southland Railway
- OSSU - Eurovos B.V.
- OTCO - Owensville Terminal Company
- OTCR - Oakdale Traction Corporation
- OTDX - Greenbrier Leasing Corporation
- OTPX - Otter Tail Power Company
- OTR - Oakland Terminal Railway
- OTRX - On-Track Railway Services, Ltd.
- OTSX - On-Track Railway Services, Ltd.
- OTT - Ottumwa Terminal Railroad
- OTTX - TTX Corporation
- OTVR - Otter Tail Valley Railroad (RailAmerica)
- OUCH - Ouachita Railroad
- OUCX - Orlando Utilities Commission
- OURD - Ogden Union Railway and Depot Company
- OVEX - Ohio Valley Electric Company
- OVNZ - Overnite Transportation Company
- OVO - Ottawa Valley Railway
- OVR - Ohio Valley Railroad
- OWIX - Old World Transportation, Ltd.
- OWLU - Ocean World Lines, Inc.
- OWSX - Oil Well Supply Company
- OWTX - Shamrock Coal Company
- OXYU - Eurotainer US, Inc.
