= Raymond G. Esposito Trail =

Nature Trail

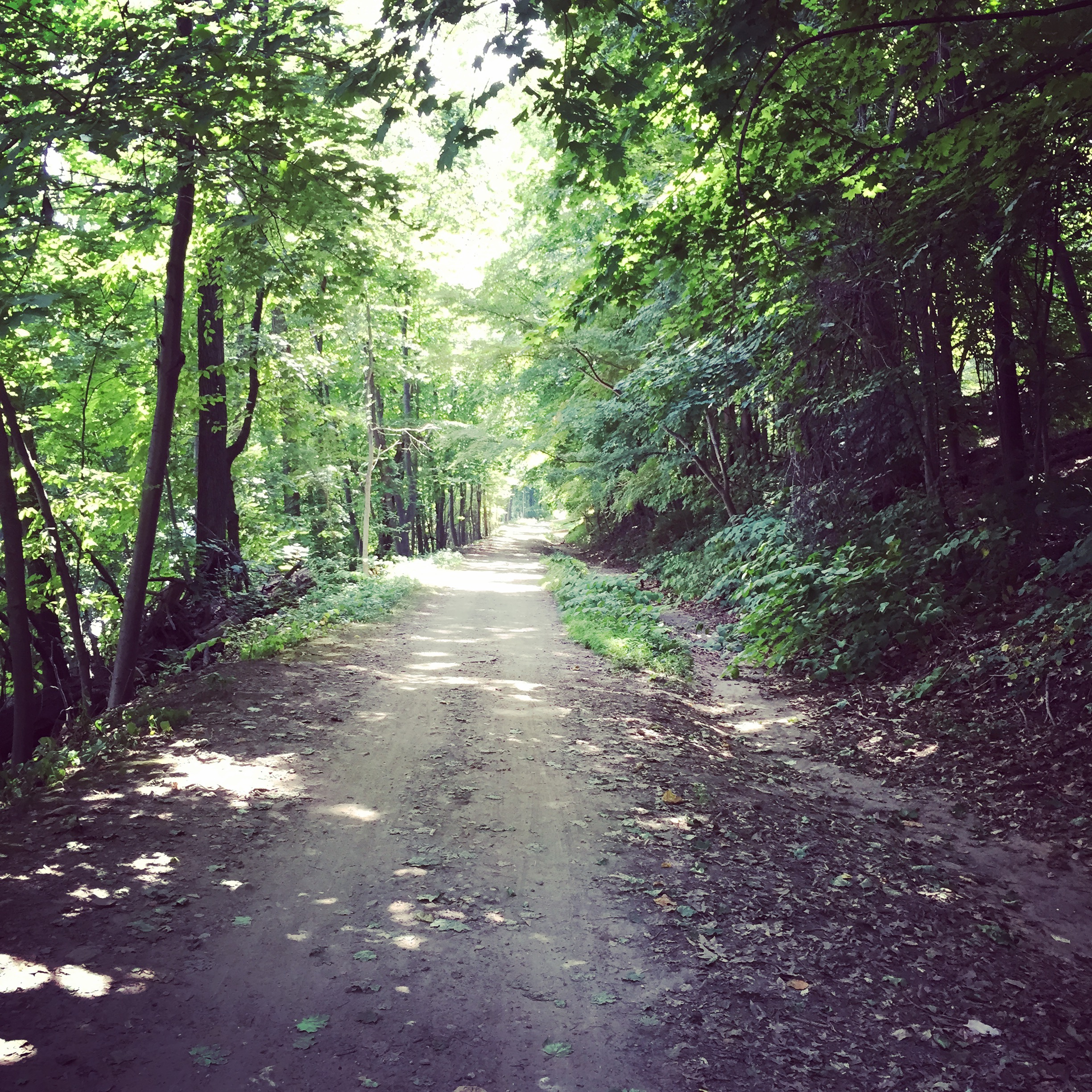
- Esposito Trail in South Nyack, New York.
- Length: 3.4 mi (5.5 km)
- Location: Rockland County, New York
- Trailheads: Franklin Street Park in Nyack; 41°05′16″N 73°55′18″W; Old Erie Path in Grand View-on-Hudson; 41°04′25″N 73°55′22″W
- Use: Hiking & Mountain Biking

The Raymond G. Esposito Trail is a 1.1 mile north-south rail trail located in the village of South Nyack, Rockland County, New York. It begins at Franklin Street Park at the corner of Cedar Hill Road and Franklin Avenue on the border of Nyack and South Nyack, which was the site of the original Nyack station, and continues as the Old Erie Path upon crossing the border into Grand View-on-Hudson. The trail takes its name from Raymond Esposito, a long-time village official who died in 1986.

The trail follows the former Northern Branch, which was originally constructed in 1859 by the Northern Railroad of New Jersey from Nyack to Pavonia Terminal in Jersey City. In 1942, the Northern Railroad of New Jersey was sold to the Erie Railroad, where it was known as the Northern Branch until passenger service ceased in 1966.
