= Lake Ontario Shore Railroad =

Overview
- Headquarters: Oswego, New York
- Locale: New York
- Dates of operation: 1873–1874

Technical
- Track gauge: 4 ft 8 1/2 in (1,435 mm) standard gauge

The Lake Ontario Shore Railroad (LOSRR) was a short-lived common carrier railroad in New York that was absorbed by the Rome, Watertown and Ogdensburg Railroad.

== Construction ==
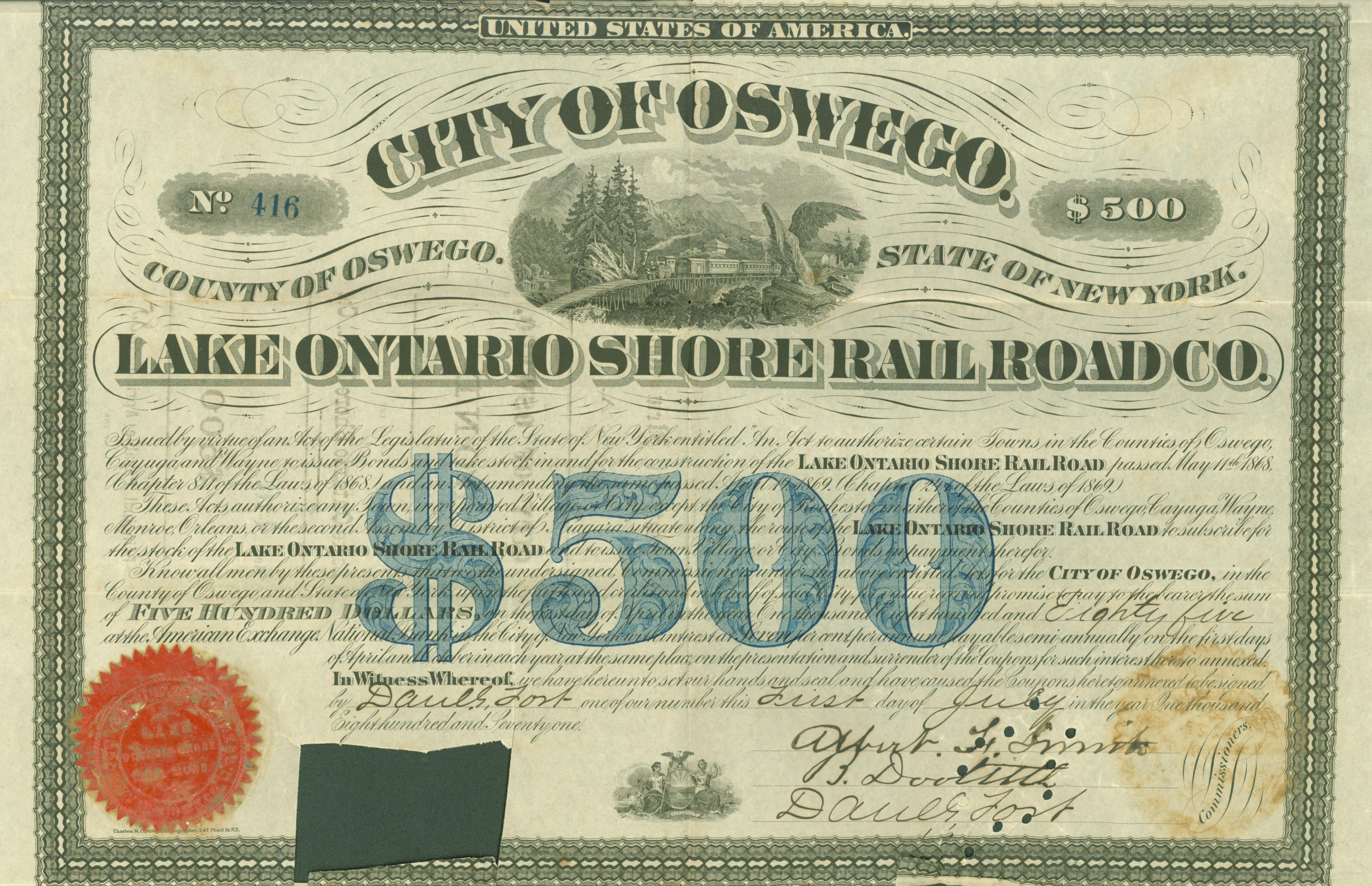
Bond of the City of Oswego for the construction of the Lake Ontario Shore Rail Road, issued 1 July 1871.

The LOSRR was chartered to be built from Suspension Bridge, New York to Oswego, New York in 1858. The Lake Ontario Shore Railroad Company was founded in Oswego on March 27, 1868. Under Chief Engineer James Ross, work commenced in August 1871 in Red Creek, New York. Tracks were open to Oswego, New York in 1873.

== Early Death ==
Despite heavy support from on-line and planned on-line communities, the LOSRR was unable to handle its great financial obligations. Reasons include a lack of manufacturing industries, bypassing Rochester, New York and close competition with the New York Central Railroad. Construction only got as far as Kendall, New York. On September 22, 1874, the railroad was sold in court under foreclosure to the Rome, Watertown and Ogdensburg Railroad, who reorganized the railroad as the Lake Ontario Railroad Company on September 29. On October 22, this company and the RW&O made an agreement to consolidate, which was filed with the New York Secretary of State on December 23, 1875.

== See also ==
- List of defunct New York railroads
