= Blue Disc Trail (Harriman State Park) =

Trail in New York, United States

- Length: 2.8 mi (4.5 km)
- Location: Harriman State Park, Ramapo, New York
- Trailheads: Johnsontown Road cul-de-sac to Tri-Trail Corner
- Use: Hiking
- Season: All
- Months: 12
- Sights: Almost Perpendicular, Pound Mountain, Elbow Brush, and Claudius Smith Rock

The Blue Disc Trail is a marked trail in Harriman State Park, New York, United States. The trail is 2.8 miles (4.5 km) long, connecting Johnsontown Road to the Ramapo-Dunderberg and Victory Trails. The blaze of the trail is a white blaze with a blue dot on it. The trail climbs two mountains, Almost Perpendicular and Pound Mountain, and passes two major rock formations, Elbow Brush and Claudius Smith Rock. The trail dates back to the 1920s with the Tuxedo Trail and 1932 as the Red Disc Trail by Paul H. Schubert. The trail was official in 1943, when Alexander Jassup replaced the red markers with blue discs.

== Trail description ==
The Blue Disc Trail starts from the north side of the road just before the cul-de-sac at the end of Johnsontown Road. The trail begins going up switchbacks to a pumping station for the Columbia Gas Transmission Corporation. The pipeline, which was created in 1949, crosses the Blue Disc Trail later on the route. Beyond the pumping station, the Blue Disc Trail turns onto a woods road. However, before 1991, the Blue Disc Trail followed the gas line for another 0.15 of a mile to the Kakiat Trail. After 0.3 of a mile on the woods road, the Blue Disc Trail joins up with the Kakiat Trail and soon splits again. The Blue Disc Trail continues for another 0.3 of a mile to the top of Almost Perpendicular, a name given by the Fresh Air Club in 1936. The trail continues on old, eroded road and crosses the gas line again at 1.35 miles (2.17 km).

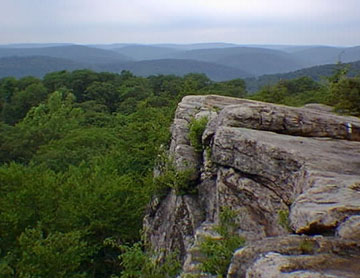
Claudius Smith Rock (to the right is a Blue Disc Trail marker)

After meeting up with the gas line at milepost 1.35, the Blue Disc Trail continues and ends crossing the same gas line again at milepost 1.5. The trail splits into two parts here, one higher than the other, and continues for 0.15 of a mile to Elbow Brush. Elbow Brush is a tight crevice made out of rocks. The trail continues without any notable mentions until milepost 2, where it crosses the Tuxedo - Mt. Ivy Trail at the higher base of Claudius Smith Rock. Claudius Smith Rock is named after Claudius Smith, a convict who used the rock as a hideout from the law. He was hanged in Goshen in 1779. The next section of the Blue Disc Trail, continuing north, goes over the Big Pine Hill. The White Cross Trail, which starts 250 feet (76 m) away from the Blue Disc, is a safer route down the hill in the winter when the Blue Disc is icy. At the base of the hill, the Blue Disc Trail crosses a dam made of rocks and finally ends at Tri-Trail Corner, which is the meet of the Ramapo-Dunderberg Trail, Victory Trail and Blue Disc Trail. This point is 2.8 miles (4.5 km) away from the Johnsontown Road cul-de-sac.

== History ==
In the early 1920s and 1930s, the Tuxedo Trail used to start from the town of Tuxedo and ended at Reeves Farm on Johnsontown Road. That route is now followed by the current-day Kakiat Trail and Blue Disc Trail. Hikers were brought to a mountain called Almost Perpendicular. From atop the mountain, the route followed a trail that reached Claudius Smith Rock with green cairns. Due to the green cairns, the trail was given the name Green Cairn Trail.

In spring 1932, Paul H. Schubert (d. 1961) marked a trail with red discs that stretched from Sloatsburg, New York, to Miss Julia Siedler's property on Johnsontown Road to Almost Perpendicular. Schubert had moved from Germany in 1891. A member of the NY-NJ Trail Conference, he had also blazed the Trail of Raccoon Hills. Almost Perpendicular and the land to the north were owned by the Tuxedo Park Association. At sporadic times, Miss Siedler and the TP Association closed their lands so that they would not become public thoroughfares. In October 1943, the red metal disks on the Red Disc Trail were replaced by blue ones supplied by Alexander Jassup.

The Blue Disc Trail used to start at the second corner of Johnsontown Road and Seven Lakes Drive; however, it was moved to the cul-de-sac on Johnsontown Road, where parking exists.

== Major intersections ==
Mile	Trail	Notes
0.00	Johnsontown Road (CR 97)	Southern terminus of the Blue Disc Trail.
2.05	Tuxedo-Mount Ivy Trail	Located at Claudius Smith Rock
2.80	Victory and Ramapo-Dunderberg Trails	Northern terminus of the Blue Disc Trail.

== See also ==
- List of trails in New York
