= Old Erie Path =

Rail trail in New York, United States

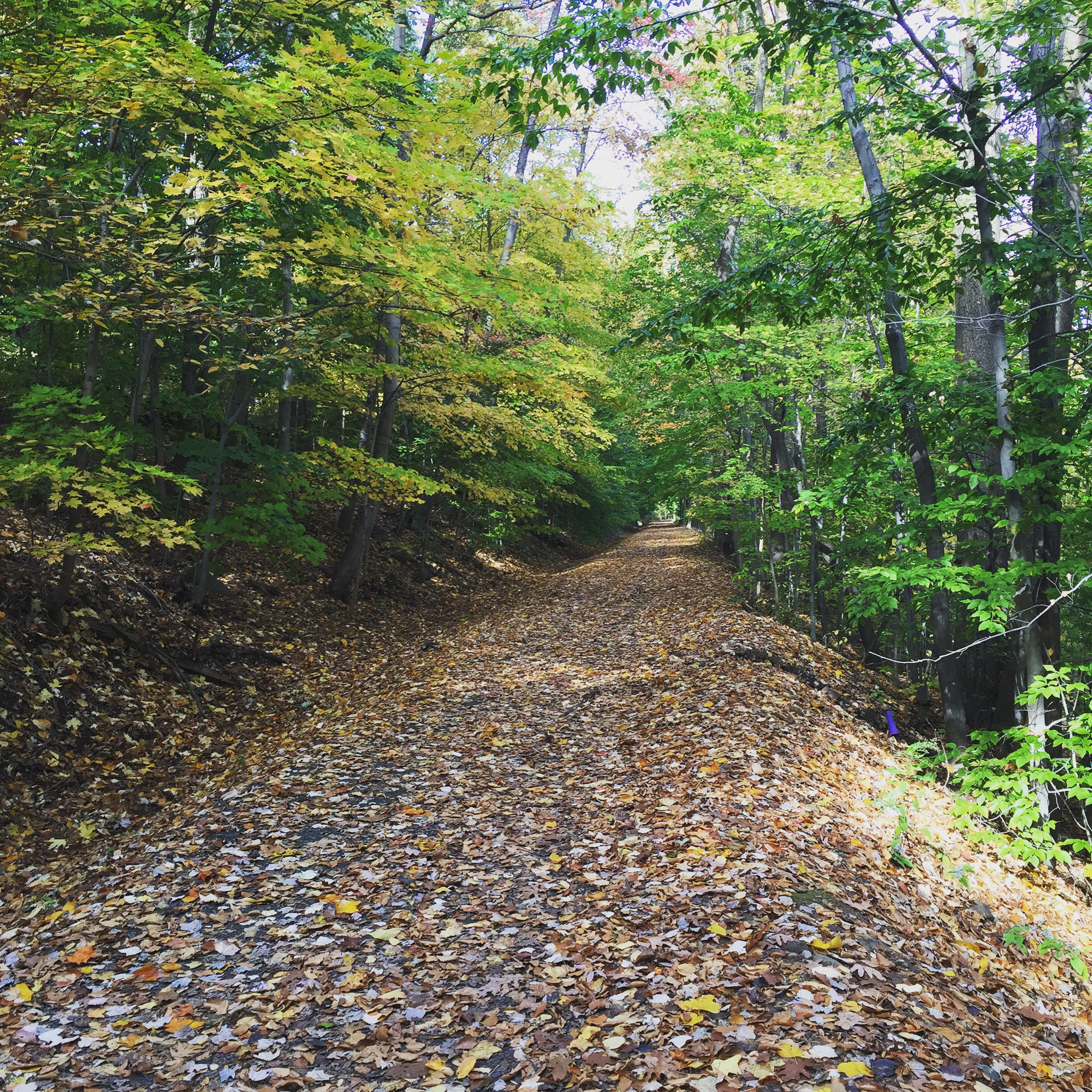
- Old Erie Path in Piermont, New York.
- Length: 3.4 mi (5.5 km)
- Location: Rockland County, New York
- Trailheads: Raymond G. Esposito Trail in South Nyack; 41°04′24″N 73°55′21″W; Joseph B. Clarke Rail Trail in Sparkill; 41°01′53″N 73°55′39″W
- Use: Hiking & Mountain Biking

The Old Erie Path is a 3.4 mile north-south rail trail in the town of Orangetown, Rockland County, New York. It begins at the southern edge of South Nyack at the end of the Raymond G. Esposito Trail, spanning Grand View-on-Hudson and Piermont before terminating at the junction of the Joseph B. Clarke Rail Trail in Sparkill. The trail is a dirt path, suitable for hiking and mountain biking.

The trail follows the former Northern Branch, which was originally constructed in 1859 by the Northern Railroad of New Jersey from Nyack to Pavonia Terminal in Jersey City. In 1942, the Northern Railroad of New Jersey was sold to the Erie Railroad, where it was known as the Northern Branch until passenger service ceased in 1966.

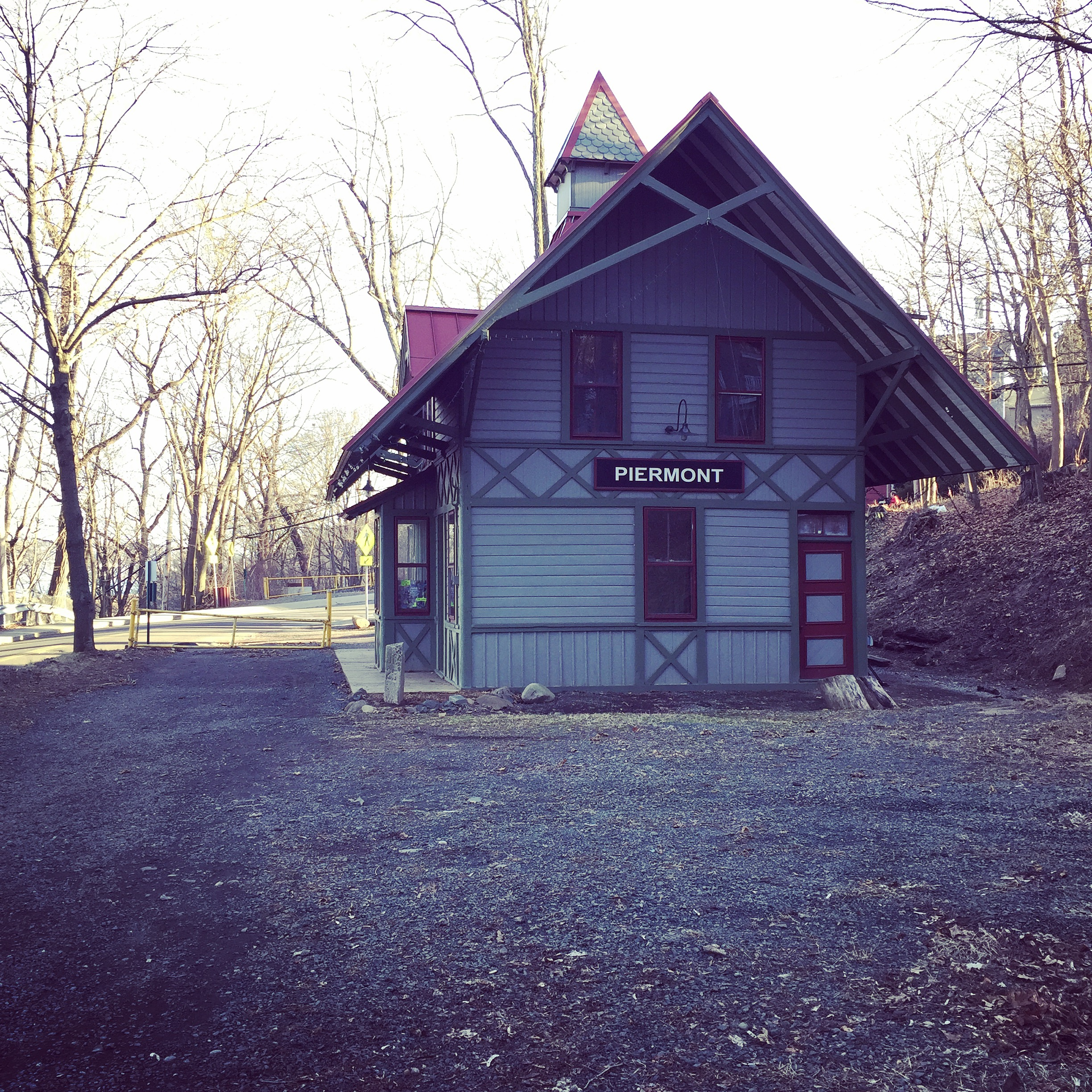
Piermont station

The trail passes by Piermont station, which is maintained by the Piermont Historical Society and is listed on the National Register of Historic Places as of 2008. The ruins of the platform of the Grand View station are visible from the trail, but the stationhouse collapsed during a storm in 1970. The trail's end is the site of the Sparkill station, but there are no remnants of the station.

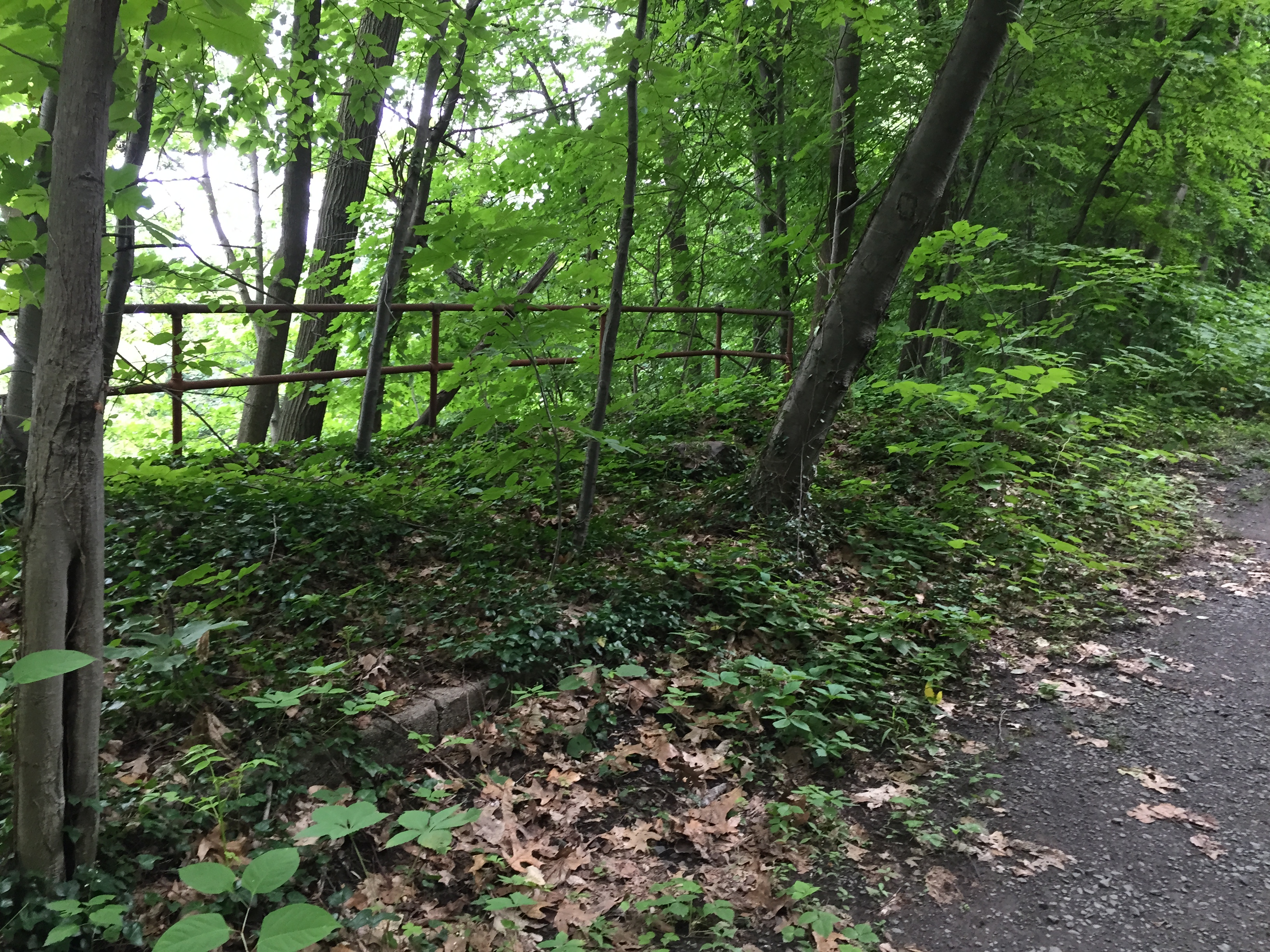
Remains of the Grand View station
