= Rome, Watertown and Ogdensburg Railroad =

Railroad in New York (state)

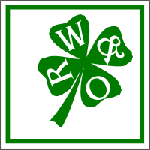

Overview
- Locale: New York
- Dates of operation: 1842–1891
- Successor: New York Central Railroad

Technical
- Track gauge: 4 ft 8 1/2 in (1,435 mm) standard gauge

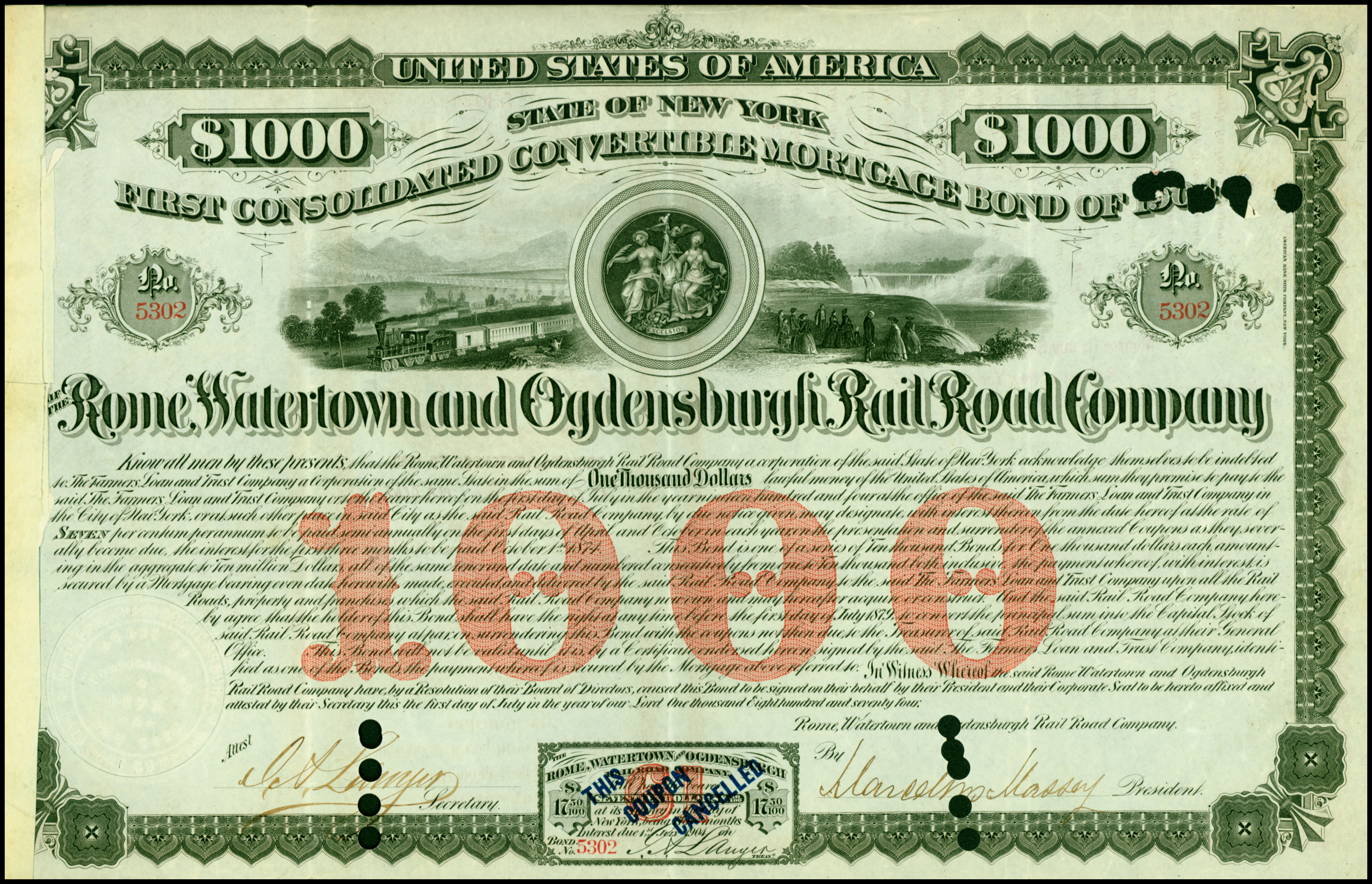
Bond of the Rome, Watertown and Ogdensburgh Rail Road Company, issued 1. July 1874

The Rome, Watertown and Ogdensburg Railroad was a railroad that grew, in stages, from Rome, New York to Watertown and then to Ogdensburg, New York and Massena, New York. The original Rome and Watertown Railroad terminated in Cape Vincent, NY on the St. Lawrence River. A branch of the Rome, Watertown and Ogdensburg Railroad, commonly known as "The Hojack Line", operated along the south shore of Lake Ontario, from Oswego, New York to Niagara Falls, New York.

After it was merged into the New York Central in 1913, the RW&O line was known as the St. Lawrence Division.

== History ==
The Rome, Watertown & Ogdensburg Railroad (RW&O) began in 1842 as the Watertown & Rome Railroad (W&R) to link Watertown with Rome, New York on the Syracuse & Utica Railroad, later consolidated as part of the New York Central Railroad (NYC). The Potsdam & Watertown Railroad was formed at this time to link Watertown with Potsdam, New York in St. Lawrence County. In 1861, these two railroads merged as the RW&O.

A branch line from DeKalb Junction (near Canton, New York) to Ogdensburg was later built. In 1864, the RW&O constructed a line from Pulaski to Oswego and merged with the Syracuse & Northern Railroad. In 1858, the Lake Ontario Shore Railroad (LOS) was chartered from Oswego to Suspension Bridge, New York (now Niagara Falls, New York). RW&O merged with the LOS in 1875; by that time the LOS was bankrupt. Branch lines reached what became resort towns along the St. Lawrence River at the end of the 19th century: Cape Vincent, Clayton and Ogdensburg. At the first two towns, ferries were available to Ontario towns on the opposite side of the river, as well as the Thousand Islands.

The RW&O was nicknamed "Rotten Wood & Old Rusty Rails" due to its crumbling infrastructure. By 1878, the RW&O had been merged into the Delaware, Lackawanna & Western Railroad (DL&W). DL&W built the Ontario Secondary in 1882 (Beebee line) from Charlotte, New York (where the Genesee River flows into Lake Ontario) to Rochester, New York. By 1891, RW&O became a subsidiary of NYC. On April 12, 1913, the RW&O was formally merged into the NYC.

In 20th century timetables for the New York Central Railroad (NYC), the line was referred to as the St. Lawrence Division. Revenue passenger service was operated from the NYC's "Water Level Route" mainline. Coach passengers for the route to Watertown, Potsdam and on to Massena changed trains at Syracuse. Passengers for the branch splitting off the route at Philadelphia, New York for Ogdensburg changed at Syracuse. Sleeping car passengers would be able to take a continuous through-car ride. The last sleeping cars to and from New York City operated along the route in 1961, discontinued with the October schedule. The local coach service to Ogdensburg ended by October, 1961 as well. The remaining local coach service for Massena was dropped from the timetable by April, 1964.

== Legacy ==
Former RW&O trackage is operated by CSX (CSXT), Ontario Midland Railroad (OMID) and the Mohawk, Adirondack and Northern Railroad. Several disconnected sections of the former line have also been converted to trails, including the Webster Hojack Trail, Cayuga Hojack Trail, Maple City Trail in Ogdensburg, Harbor Rail Trail in Oswego and additional sections in Hamlin, Hilton and Rochester, New York.

The RW&O had terminals in Suspension Bridge, Rochester, Syracuse, Rome, Utica, Natural Bridge, Massena, Ogdensburg, Clayton, Cape Vincent and Sackets Harbor.

== Hojack nickname ==
The RW&O was nicknamed the Hojack, but its origins have multiple explanations.

1. Hojack originated from the engineer of the first train, Jack Welch, nicknamed "Big Jack." Welch used to be a farmer and was more familiar with horses than steam locomotives. When he stopped the trains he would shout, "Whoa Jack!". This became "Ho Jack!" over time.
2. Many people fondly called the RW&O by its nickname, "Hojack." In the early days of the railroad, a farmer in his buckboard drawn by a bulky mule was caught on a crossing while a train was approaching. When the mule was halfway across the tracks, he stopped. The train was fast approaching and the farmer naturally got excited and began shouting, "Ho-Jack, Ho-Jack." Amused by the incident, the trainmen began calling their line the "Ho-Jack."

Considerable mystery has always surrounded the origin of the nickname "Hojack" applied to the R. W. & O. division. Railroad men, when asked, seemed to have but a vague idea of the reason of the term. In a letter to the Oswego Bulletin, a writer who signs himself as an "Old Engineer," writes: "I noticed recently in an Oswego paper there was some doubt as to the origin of the word 'Hojack' as applied to the R, W. & O. division of the New York Central railroad. There are a few persons on the railroad who know how the name came to be applied, but I happen to know the exact circumstances. Along in the early 70's a man named Royal and one John Tobin were employed by the R., W. & O. railroad in running trains between Lewiston and Suspension Bridge. Royal was a gruff, genial fellow and was well liked by the railroad men at the bridge. It was his habit, when after having delivered his cars at the bridge, he was ready to return, to stand at the officer door and call out to his partner in stentorian tones. 'Ho, Jack, time to be going back.' The man and the voice became inseparably connected with the railroad and when his train appeared the men would say, 'Here comes the hojack.' The name sticks to the road and the R., W. & O., is now better known among railroad men as the 'Hojack' than it is by its corporate name."

Author Richard Palmer attributes it to a slang term for a slow local passenger train or way freight. The Port Jervis Evening Gazette reported, "[w]hile the Hojack was backing down to the depot Wednesday afternoon a horse in a team attached to a wagon from the country got its foot fast between the rail and the bed of the track in a manner similar to that which a horse belonging to Thomas Cuddeback was ruined some time ago. It was with great difficulty that the horse Wednesday was saved from a similar fate. The foot was got out just in time to get out of the way of the train."

A subsequent story in the same newspaper supports that explanation, saying "[t]he name Hojack, which the Gazette gave to the way train leaving here for the west at 1:30 in the afternoon, sticks closer than a brother, and the train is now generally known by that name." NYC attempted to ban the name by way of an edict released in 1906.

== System map ==
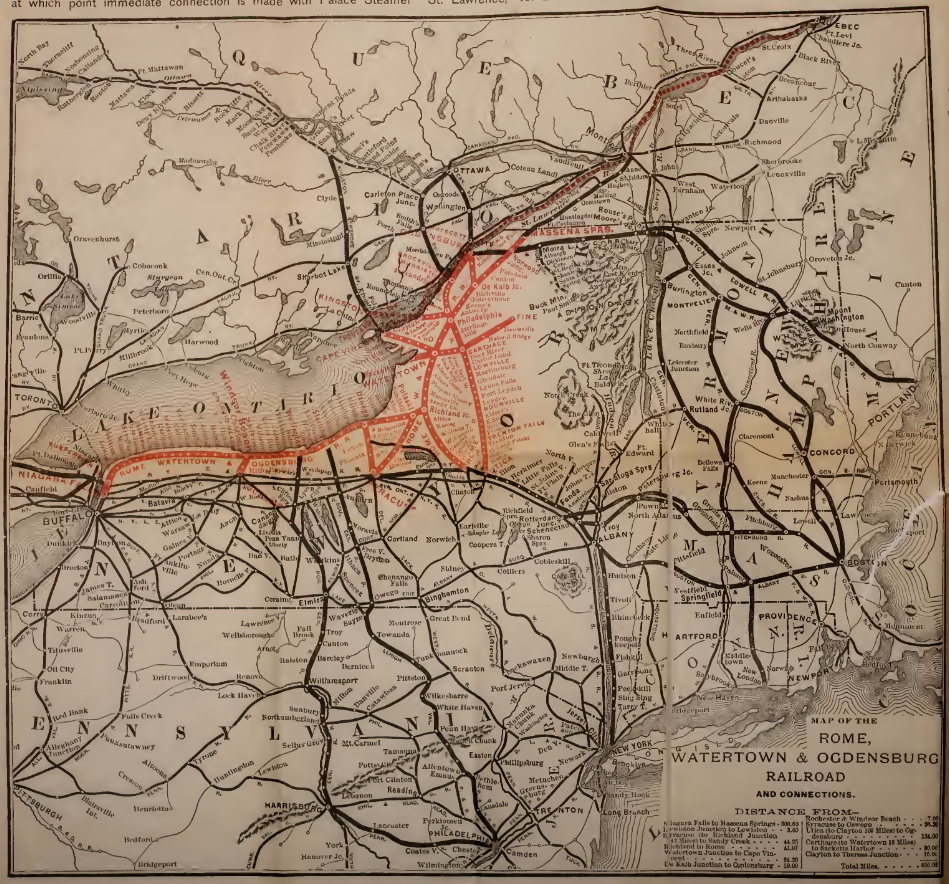
Rome, Watertown & Ogdensburg Railroad system map, 1889

== Station listing ==
Main Line
Milepost	Town / City	Station	Image	Notes	Position
	Rome	Rome			
		Humaston			
		Taberg			
		Camden			
		West Camden			
		Williamstown			
		Kasoag			
		Albion			
		Richland Junction			
		Lacona			
		Mannsville			
		Pierrepont Manor			
		Adams			
		Adams Center			
		Watertown			
		Evans Mill			
		Philadelphia			
		Antwerp			
		Keenes			
		Gouveneur			
		Richville			
		De Kalb Junction			
		Canton			
		Potsdam			
		Norwood Junction			
		Massena Springs			

== See also ==
- Ontario Midland Railroad
- Ontario Eastern Railroad
