= Ontario Midland Railroad =

Overview
- Headquarters: Sodus, New York
- Reporting mark: OMID
- Locale: New York
- Dates of operation: 1979–present

Technical
- Track gauge: 4 ft 8 1/2 in (1,435 mm) standard gauge
- Length: 52 mi (84 km)

Other
- Website: http://ontariomidland.com/

The Ontario Midland Railroad Corporation (reporting mark OMID) is an American Class III railroad company operating in western New York. As of September 2022, it became a subsidiary of the Livonia, Avon & Lakeville Railroad (LAL).

It was created to operate a portion of the former Rome, Watertown and Ogdensburg Railroad line from Oswego's West Yard to Suspension Bridge in Niagara Falls. The first OMID train operated October 1, 1979. The railroad initially operated from Hannibal in Oswego County to Webster in Monroe County. Subsequently operations ceased between Wolcott and Hannibal. The railroad also operates a line formerly operated by Conrail, Penn Central, Pennsylvania Railroad from Wallington to Newark to interchange with CSX's ex-Conrail Chicago Line. Early operations included runs to Sodus Point, where Genesee Brewing Company maintained a malt house operation until 1986 when the building closed.

The Marion Branch (former Newark & Marion Railway) was operated to serve cold storage warehouses, packing operations and a fertilizer dealer in Marion. Declining traffic and poor track conditions led to the end of its operation in July 1984.

During 1982 and 1983, a dinner train operation was operated out of Webster using privately owned equipment and OMID crews. For a number of years until 2004, the OMID operated fall foliage excursions between Sodus and Newark in conjunction with the Rochester & Genesee Valley Railroad Museum, which owns the former New York Central "Empire State Express" coach cars used for the trips.

In 1993, Ontario Midland severed its corporate partnership with the Ontario Central Railroad (ONCT). Known as the "Ontario Lines," this partnership also operated the short-lived Ontario Eastern Railroad (ONER), Jersey Southern Railway (JSRW) and the Allegheny Southern Railway (ASRW).

On September 16, 2022, the Livonia, Avon & Lakeville Railroad acquired the controlling stake of Ontario Midland by purchasing 55% of its stock according to paperwork filed with the Surface Transportation Board.

Operations on the Ontario Midland use VHF radio communications at a frequency of 161.370 MHz. The OMID carries food products, lumber, fertilizer, pulpboard, and chemicals. It moves about 850 cars a year and currently operates 52 miles (84 km) of track. The OMID operates Monday to Friday from 8:00 a.m. to 4:00 p.m. (8:00-16:00).

== Locomotive roster ==
The all time locomotive roster is, with the exception of Engine #5, all Alco or its affiliates. Ontario Midland Railroad currently operates two locomotives...Engine #416 and Engine #417.

Engine #3 was taken out of service in 2023 and eventually scrapped on February 11, 2024. Engine #35, which was being used for parts, was scrapped a few weeks later. Engine #36 and Engine #408 were sold to Southern New England Railroad (SNEX) in late 2023. Both units were active with OMID for over 40 years before being taken out of service in 2022. Engine #3560 was sold to Delaware-Lackawanna Railroad (DL) in mid-2024.

- #3 was an Alco S-4 built in 1953, formerly of the Genesee & Wyoming & New York Central (NYC).
- #5 was a GE 45-ton built in 1944, formerly of the U.S. Army (USATC).
- #35 was an Alco S-4 built in 1959 formerly of the Genesee & Wyoming (GNWR). It was primarily used for parts to maintain Engine #3.
- #36 was an Alco RS-11 built in 1957, formerly Norfolk & Western (N&W) #361.
- #408, formerly #40, was an Alco RS-36 built in 1962, formerly Norfolk & Western #408.
- #416 is an MLW RS-18U built in 1958, formerly used by LAL subsidiary B & H Rail Corporation (BH). This engine was transferred to OMID in mid-2024. It was originally owned by Canadian Pacific (CP).
- #417 is an MLW RS-18U built in 1957, formerly used by LAL subsidiary Western New York & Pennsylvania (WNYP). This engine was transferred to OMID in mid-2023. It was originally owned by Canadian Pacific (CP).
- #3560 was an MLW M-420W built in 1976, formerly of the West Tennessee (WTNN). It was originally owned by Canadian National (CN).
- #4056 was an Alco RS-3 built in 1952 for the Spokane, Portland & Seattle (SP&S). It was sold by SP&S successor Burlington Northern (BN).

Note: Some locomotives of the Ontario Lines may have been operated by other affiliates for a period of time. What is generally listed are the primary operators during their ownerships.

The previous logo for Ontario Midland Railroad before acquisition.

== Ontario Lines Affiliated Companies ==
- Ontario Midland Railroad (OMID)
- Ontario Central Railroad (ONCT)
- Ontario Eastern Railroad (ONER)
- Jersey Southern Railway (JSRW)
- Allegheny Southern Railway (ASRW)
- Rail Services Associates, Inc. (later Rail Management Services, Inc.)
