= Joseph B. Clarke Rail Trail =

Rail trail in New York

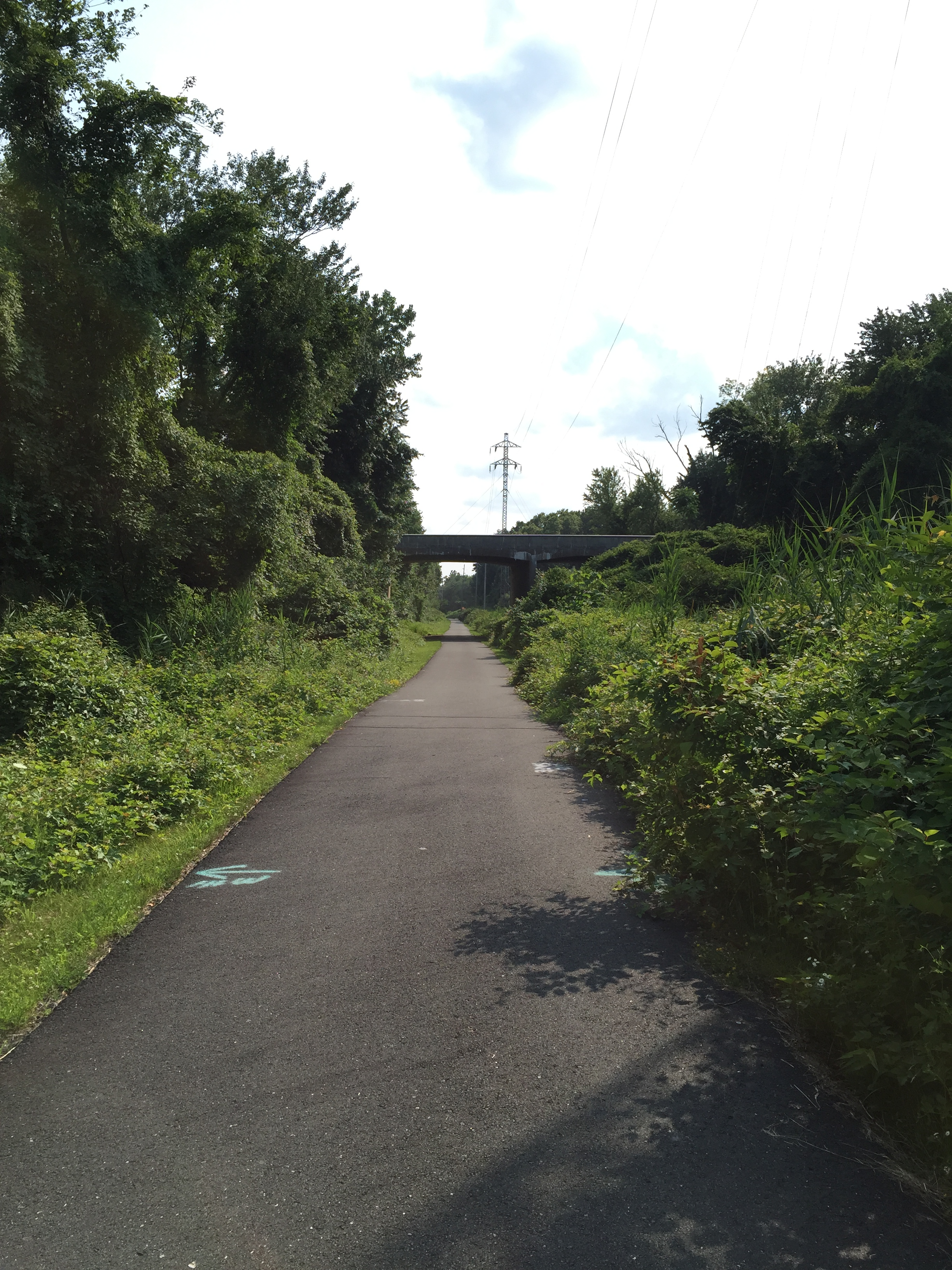
- Joseph B. Clarke Rail Trail in Tappan, New York.
- Length: 3.8 mi (6.1 km)
- Location: Rockland County, New York
- Trailheads: Blauvelt Library at Western Highway in Blauvelt; 41°03′35″N 73°57′27″W; Oak Tree Road in Tappan; 41°01′02″N 73°56′22″W
- Use: Walking & Biking

The Joseph B. Clarke Rail Trail is a paved 3.8 mile north-south rail trail in the town of Orangetown, Rockland County, New York. It begins at the Blauvelt Free Library on Western Highway in the hamlet of Blauvelt, and ends at the intersection of Oak Tree Road in the hamlet of Tappan. The trail intersects the Old Erie Path at Depot Square in Sparkill.

The trail follows the right-of-ways of two former railroads. From the southern trailhead in Tappan to Sparkill, it follows the Northern Branch, which was constructed in 1859 by the Northern Railroad of New Jersey from Nyack to Pavonia Terminal in Jersey City. The railway's right-of-way continues north from Sparkill as the Old Erie Path. Northwest of Sparkill, the trail follows the right-of-way of the old Erie Main Line (also known as the Piermont Line) of the Erie Railroad.

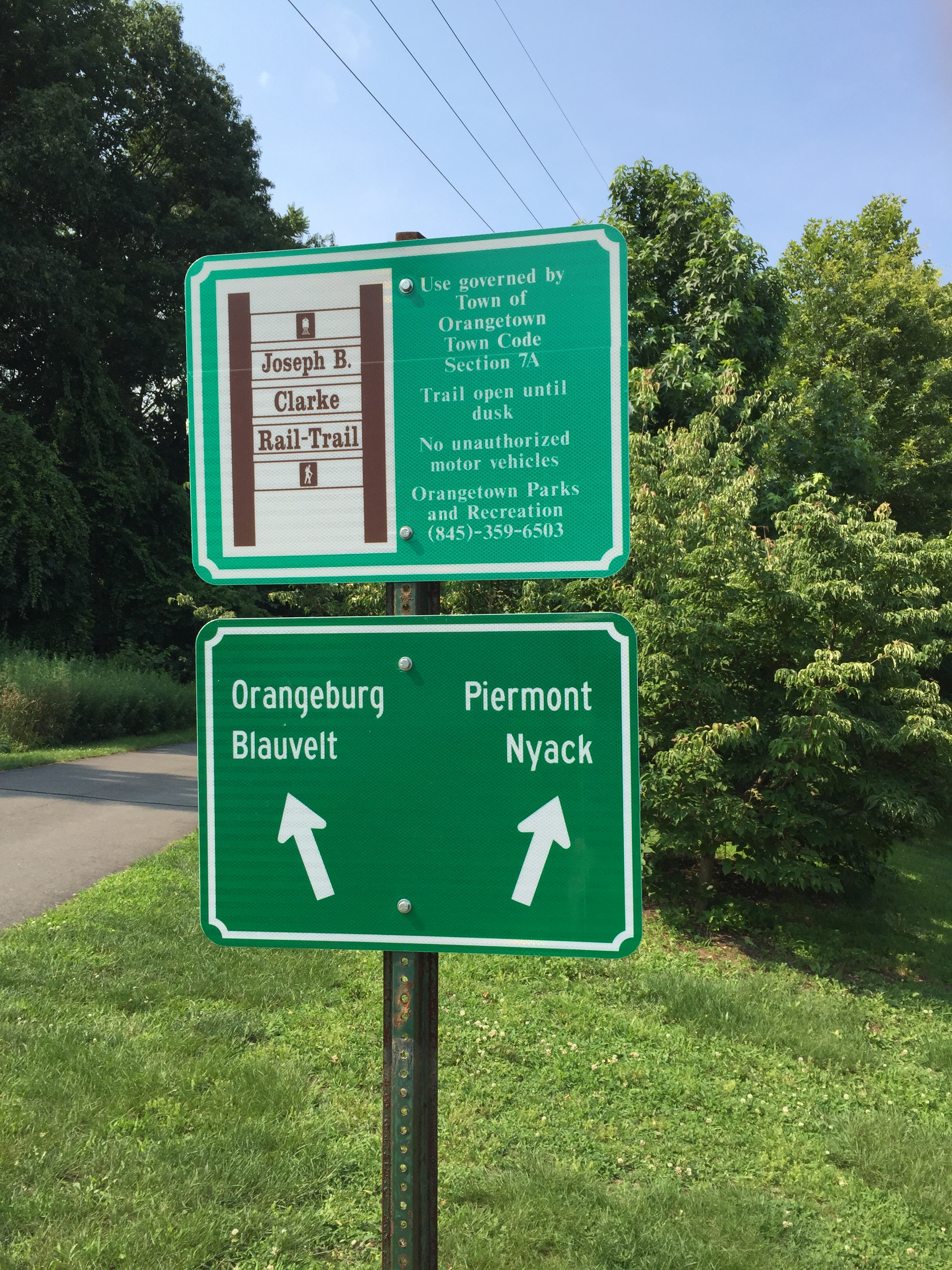
The Old Erie Path to Nyack splits off from the Clarke Trail to Blauvelt in Sparkill
