= Cayuga Hojack Trail =

Hojack trail in northern Cayuga County, New York

- Length: 8.5 miles (13.7 km)
- Location: Cayuga County, New York
- Use: snowmobiles, equestrians, cyclists, and hikers
- Right of way: Rome, Watertown and Ogdensburg Railroad
- Maintained by: Cayuga County

The Cayuga Hojack Trail is one of two Hojack trails in northern Cayuga County, New York, the other being the Webster Hojack Trail in Webster. Both are built on remnants of the Hojack, a common name for the Rome, Watertown and Ogdensburg Railroad. Cayuga County maintains the 8.5-mile (13.7 km) trail, which intersects the Cato–Fair Haven Trail south of Fair Haven. Both trails are used by snowmobiles in winter, equestrians, bicyclists, and hikers in the summer.

- Southwest terminus 43°15′26.1″N 76°42′50.4″W
- Northeast terminus 43°19′43.0″N 76°35′54.5″W
