= Ontario Central Railroad =

Class III railroad in New York

Overview
- Headquarters: Geneva, New York
- Reporting mark: ONCT
- Locale: New York
- Dates of operation: 1979–present

Technical
- Track gauge: 4 ft 8 1/2 in (1,435 mm) standard gauge
- Length: 13 mi (21 km)

Other
- Website: http://www.fingerlakesrail.com

The Ontario Central Railroad (reporting mark ONCT) is an American class III railroad company operating in Ontario County, New York. As of 2007, the ONCT has been under the ownership of the Finger Lakes Railway which is based in Geneva, New York.

The ONCT was formed from an approximate 13 mile section of the Lehigh Valley mainline from Shortsville, New York to Victor, New York as well as a short section of the New York Central's Auburn Road in Victor. This trackage was saved by the actions of the communities it serves. The plan for forming Conrail involved the abandonment of all the trackage that became the ONCT; but several rail customers wanted to keep rail service. With the building of a short connection from the LV to NYC trackage in Victor and an interchange in Shortsville, the ONCT began operating the rail lines in 1979; before which Conrail was obligated to do so as the designated operator.

Throughout the years, the ONCT has had a number of customers; but Victor Insulators, Inc. has been there from the beginning and was still receiving service as of 2019. This particular section in the Victor area may eventually be removed, though, per recent meetings between the Village of Victor, Town of Victor, Ontario County and Finger Lakes Railway. Other customers include, or have been, Ryan Homes, Iron City Sash & Door and others. The sole interchange for the ONCT has been in Shortsville, where Conrail constructed an interchange with the former Auburn Road of the NYC.

From the beginning the ONCT was a member of the "Ontario Lines" family of shorts lines in New York State until 1993. Other members included the Ontario Midland Railroad and the Ontario Eastern Railroad. In 1998, the Livonia, Avon and Lakeville Railroad bought a controlling interest in the ONCT. Then, in October 2007, the LAL sold the ONCT to the Finger Lakes Railway.

== Locomotive roster ==
Below is a list of locomotives that were operated by the Ontario Central Railroad:

ONCT 14 was an Alco S-2 built in 1947, Originally Buffalo Creek (BCK) #46. It became CR 9662, then ONCT 46. It was owned by RSA Leasing (based in Syracuse, New York) The loco was leased for a time to New York and Lake Erie RR, and temporarily carried reporting marks of Ontario Midland railroad (OMID) but never went to that line. After the NYLE lease the unit returned to ONCT, where it was repainted and renumbered ONCT 14 It subsequently was leased to North American Car Co. in Sayre PA. RSA eventually sold the unit to Tioga Central Railroad.

ONCT 40 was originally N&W 408, then Ontario Midland 408. It was sent to ONCT 02-04-1981 to replace #86 while work was done on that loco at the Sodus shop. The unit was lettered for Ontario Central but retained the number 40. It only worked about 3 months on ONCT before being sent to Hornell NY for wheel work departing 05-03-1981. After that work it was returned to Ontario Midland and relettered for that road.

ONCT 46 See #14

ONCT 86 (later #418) was an Alco RS-36 built in 1962. It was originally owned by the New York, Chicago & St.Louis (Nickel Plate Road, NKP) as #865. It became Norfolk & Western (N&W) #2865 and carried that number when purchased by RSA Leasing and delivered to ONCT shortly before the line began operation. The unit later spent just over 2 years on Ontario Midland but retained the ONCT reporting marks.

It departed ONCT 05-25-1999, and returned 06-01-2000 repainted and renumbered 418, under the numbering system of ONCT’s then owner, LA&L. With LA&L’s sale of ONCT to Finger Lakes Ry, it departed ONCT for the last time in 2007.

ONCT 418 See ONCT 86

GSRX 708 was owned by Golden Spike Railroad Services, a lessor. This EMD SW-9 was originally Apalachicola Northern #708 and had several other owners before arriving on ONCT 02-06-1996. The unit was backup for 86/418, and then was ONCT’s sole power for over a year. Its lease was continued under FGLK ownership of ONCT until about 2010 .

ONER 4085 was an Alco RS-3 built for Delaware & Hudson. It arrived on ONCT May 3, 1981 when #40 left. It was used on ONCT before going to Ontario Eastern Railway, another of the Ontario Lines group as ONER 4085. When ONER ceased operations, 4085 was returned to ONCT and was used there, still lettered ONER., It was sold to Genesee Valley Transportation, and departed on 8-15-1989

GSRX 5913 GSRX 6051 GSRX 6145 GSRX 6607 were 4 EMD GP-9 units owned by Golden Spike Railroad Services. They were stored on ONCT and were used occasionally on a days-of-use rental while ONCT’s own power was down. None were lettered for ONCT.

There were also at least two occasions prior to the FGLK taking over the line that ONCT borrowed a unit from Finger Lakes Railway for one round trip while maintenance was done on their regular power. These two units were FGLK 1751, an EMD GP9, and FGLK 2201, a U23B (painted in a Lehigh Valley Railroad inspired paint scheme).

== Ontario Lines Affiliated Companies ==
- Ontario Midland Railroad (OMID)
- Ontario Central Railroad (ONCT)
- Ontario Eastern Railroad (ONER)
- Jersey Southern Railway (JSRW)
- Allegheny Southern Railway (ASRW)
- Rail Services Associates, Inc. (later Rail Management Services, Inc.)
