= Owasco River Railway =

Overview
- Headquarters: Auburn, New York
- Locale: New York (state)
- Dates of operation: incorporated June 2, 1881 operated 1886–1976
- Successors: New York Central in 1929 and 50% to Lehigh Valley in 1931; Penn Central in 1976

Technical
- Track gauge: 4 ft 8 1/2 in (1,435 mm)
- Length: 0.5 mi (0.80 km)

The Owasco River Railway was a switching railroad that provided rail service to several industries on the Owasco River in Auburn, New York, interchanging with the New York Central Railroad and the Lehigh Valley Railroad via trackage rights on the New York Central. Incorporated on June 2, 1881, completed construction in 1882, and opened by 1886, it was initially owned by the International Harvester Company. In 1919, the Interstate Commerce Commission found, in a decision for the Owasco River Railroad, that short line and industrial railroads were common carriers and were entitled to appropriate haulage rates from trunk lines.

The New York Central gained control of the company by lease in 1929 and sold half of the stock to the Lehigh Valley Railroad in 1931.

The company was eventually acquired by the Penn Central Transportation Company, successor to the New York Central, and was abandoned in 1976 when Conrail was formed. Penn Central later used the company to own real estate from abandoned rail lines, and it remains as a subsidiary of American Premier Underwriters, successor to Penn Central.
