= Ontario Eastern Railroad =

Erstwhile shortline freight railroad

The Ontario Eastern Railroad (reporting mark ONER) was a shortline freight railroad formed in 1981 to operate a portion of the former Rome, Watertown and Ogdensburg Railroad from Ogdensburg to DeKalb Junction. The primary freight customer was a paper mill located in Ogdensburg. When the mill shut down in 1985, the railroad ended operations. Formal abandonment followed in 1987 and the tracks were scrapped. The ONER was officially dissolved in 1992.

Subsidiaries Jersey Southern Railway (JSRW) and Allegheny Southern Railway (ASRW) were also placed under ONER management. Beginning in 1983, the JSRW operated a four-mile branch line in South Deerfield, New Jersey, to serve a frozen foods plant before the trackage was taken over by the Winchester and Western Railroad in 1987. In Pennsylvania, the ASRW operated a former Pennsylvania Railroad line near Hollidaysburg from 1982 to 1984 before it was acquired by Everett Railroad in 1985. They were all affiliates of the Ontario Lines group of shortlines.

== Locomotive roster ==
Below is a list of locomotives that were operated by Ontario Eastern Railroad and its subsidiaries, all Alco.

- #16 was an Alco S-2 built in 1948, formerly Wyandotte Terminal (WTR) #106, originally of the Baltimore & Ohio (B&O). It was leased to Jersey Southern (JSRW) in New Jersey.
- #17 was an Alco S-4 built in 1953, formerly Wyandotte Terminal (WTR) #107, previously owned by the N&W. Today it is at Rochester & Genesee Valley Railroad Museum in Rush, New York. It has been re-painted into the paint scheme of its original owner: the New York, Chicago & St.Louis (Nickel Plate Road (NKP)). The N&W absorbed the NKP in 1965. The #16 and #17 were never owned by the Ontario Midland. They were owned by RSA Leasing of Syracuse, New York (a lineside community). From 1982 to 1985, Engine #17 was leased to Allegheny Southern (ASRW). It was returned to Sodus in 1985. While in Pennsylvania, it wore the number 17.
- #4085 was an Alco RS-3 built in 1952 and operated under the Ontario Eastern (ONER), formerly of the Delaware & Hudson (D&H).

Note: Some locomotives of the Ontario Lines may have been operated by other affiliates for a period of time. What is generally listed are the primary operators during their ownerships.

== Ontario Lines affiliated companies ==
- Ontario Midland Railroad (OMID)
- Ontario Central Railroad (ONCT)
- Ontario Eastern Railroad (ONER)
- Jersey Southern Railway (JSRW)
- Allegheny Southern Railway (ASRW)
- Rail Services Associates, Inc. (later Rail Management Services, Inc.)
