= Rutland Trail =

Rail trail in New York, United States

Coordinates: 44°47′N 74°46′W

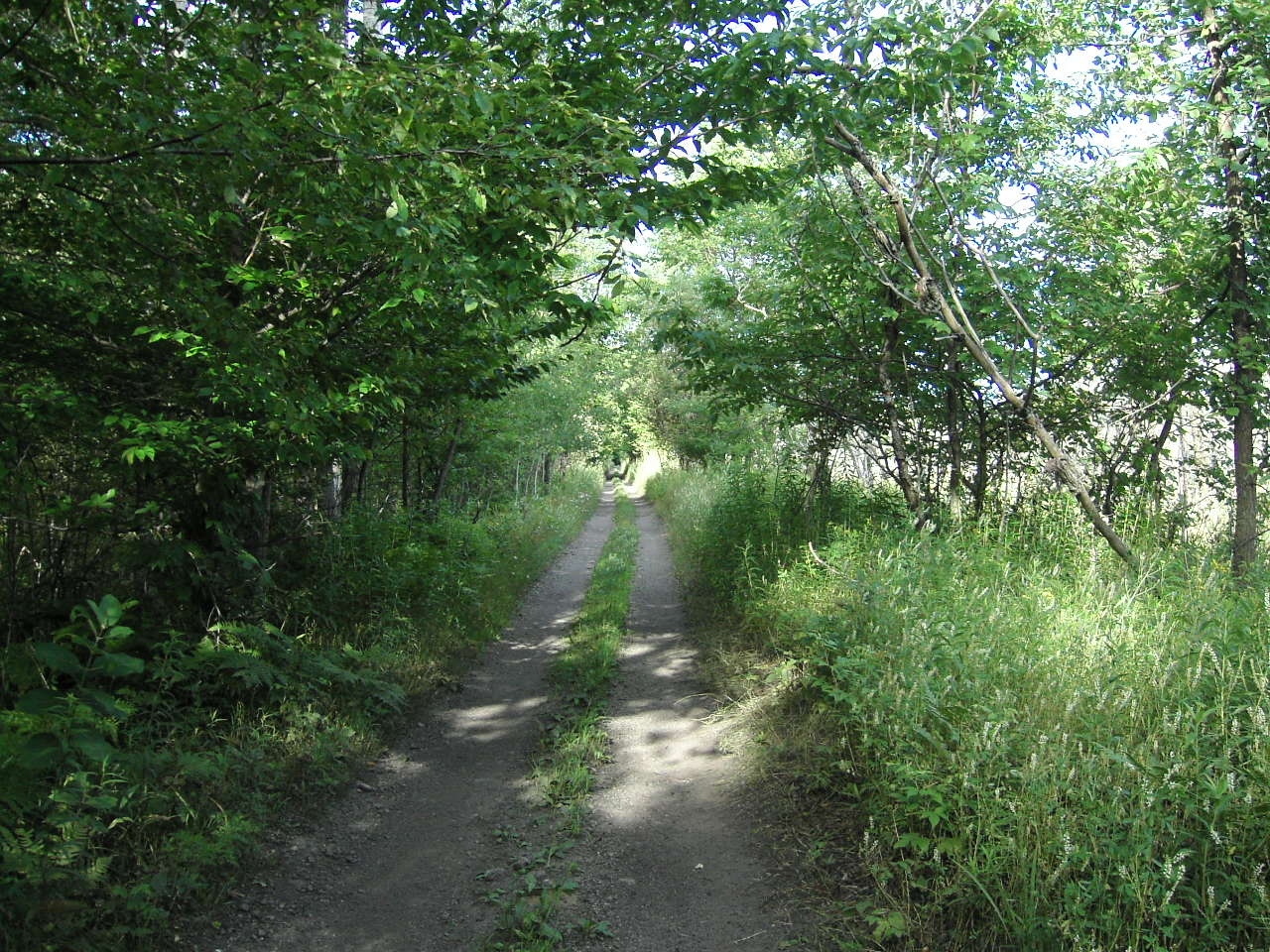
- Length: 21.2 mi (34.1 km)
- Location: St. Lawrence County, New York; Franklin County, New York
- Trailheads: Norwood; Moira
- Use: Walking, jogging, bicycling, dog walking, all-terrain vehicles, snowmobiling, skiing
- Hazards: Unpaved with muddy sections
- Website: http://rutlandtrail.org/

The Rutland Trail is a multi-use rail trail extending for 21.2 miles (34.1 km) from Norwood to Moira, New York. It consists of portions of the Rutland Railway in St. Lawrence and Franklin counties.

The trail starts from Railroad Avenue in Norwood (proceed eastward along the south side of the CSX tracks), and is continuous to Winthrop, where the bridge was removed. In Winthrop one must cross the St. Regis River on a highway bridge and skirt one half mile of railbed made inaccessible by the missing bridge. The trail is ridable from there into the village of North Lawrence, where the bridge was removed. Beyond that is a one-mile (1.6 km) section which is posted by Healthy Foods, Inc; beyond that section the trail is ridable to Moira.
