= Webster Hojack Trail =

Hojack trail in New York

Coordinates: 43°13′23″N 77°26′57″W

The Webster Hojack Trail is one of two Hojack trails in New York, the other being the Cayuga Hojack Trail. Both are built on remnants of the Hojack, a common name for the Rome, Watertown and Ogdensburg Railroad. The Friends of Webster Trails maintains this 3.5-mile-long (5.6 km) trail, fully within the Town of Webster. It begins at Phillips Road near Route 104 east of the village and runs along the right of way, now owned by Rochester Gas & Electric, to Lake Road.
