= Oswego Recreational Trail =

Rail trail in New York, United States

The Oswego County Recreation Trail is a multi-use rail trail in New York.

The Oswego Recreational Trail actually comprises two trails which are separated by an on-road section. It follows the route of the former New York, Ontario and Western Railway, abandoned in 1957.

The east portion runs 10 miles (16 km) from the city of Fulton's Maple Avenue (43°18′42″N 76°22′48″W) to the village of Central Square, (43°15′40″N 76°8′42″W) just short of Interstate 81. I-81 was built following the NYO&W abandonment and no provision was made to preserve the railroad right-of-way by creating a grade separation.

To get around I-81, you must travel on roads through Central Square. North on U.S. Route 11, east on New York State Route 49 across I-81, and south on County Route 37 takes you back to the trail (43°16′38.6″N 76°6′59.0″W). At that point, the trail to the west (back towards I-81) is ridable, but it ends at a creek where the railroad bridge has been removed. Once back on the trail, it is 16 miles (26 km) to Cleveland (43°14′13.6″N 75°53′5.8″W) and the Oneida County line. The right-of-way continues as a privately owned trail, open for some uses.

The trail has not been resurfaced except in a few eroded spots. The railroad used crushed rock ballast that remains as the surface of the trail. The trail crosses many steams on the original railroad bridges. They have been decked over with steel. Any road which crosses the trail may be used to gain access to the trail. Convenient parking is available at County Route 6, south of Fulton; on Toad Harbor Road, off Route 49, near Three Mile Bay; and in the village of Cleveland on North Street.
