= Auburn Trail =

Rail trail in New York, United States

Coordinates: 42°58′50″N 77°24′46″W

The Auburn Trail is a multi-use rail trail located principally in the towns of Victor and Farmington, Ontario County, New York (USA). It is approximately 11 miles (18 km) long and maintained by the Towns of Victor and Farmington and Victor Hiking Trails. The trail mostly follows the alignment of the Auburn and Rochester Railroad. Additional disconnected portions of the trail are found in the Towns of Pittsford and Brighton, Monroe County, NY. A detailed description and map of the Auburn Trail are available from Victor Hiking Trails.

== Victor - Farmington Route ==
North and west of Woolston Rd, the Town of Pittsford continues the Auburn Trail for a ways as a footpath.

This 9 miles (14 km) section was constructed and is maintained by the Town of Victor, New York and Victor Hiking Trails Inc. as a multi-use trail. Their detailed map of the Auburn Trail and trail description is available. It is mostly 8-foot to 10-foot wide stonedust surface. Most of the route is on the bed of the Auburn and Rochester Railroad (later New York Central Railroad). It passes through village, suburban, rural, parkland, light industrial, and considerable "suburban wild" areas.

The Auburn Trail runs southeast from Woolston Rd and Powder Mills Park (extended in 2012-'13), and crosses Railroad Mills Rd. There are two bridges over Irondequoit Creek, one the original railroad stone culvert, the other a new (2011) steel bridge where the old culvert collapsed. There is limited parking available at the trailhead in Powder Mills Park, at Railroad Mills Rd, and Fishers Rd. A pocket park is located at the steel bridge.

The trail crosses Fishers Road approximately 1,000 feet (300 m) north of the New York State Thruway, and then crosses under the Thruway shortly thereafter (because the Auburn Railroad was active when the Thruway was constructed, the Thruway was built over the alignment; this tunnel under the Thruway continues to serve the trail.)

From the Thruway, the trail continues south, over Irondequoit Creek, and through the hamlet of Fishers, New York.

In and around Fishers is an area known as "Art Along the Auburn." Some of the art includes a mural in the Thruway underpass (2014-2018), an innovative bike rack as a train cowcatcher, a "troll" next to a bridge on the connecting Domine Trail, and others for trail users to discover.

A cobblestone pumphouse, built in 1845 and used to water the steam locomotives, is just south of Main Street Fishers. Parking is available at the trailhead and kiosk behind the Fishers Fire House. The trail continues to the southeast of Fishers, past Phillips Road. In this block is a major sports facility (2015). Limited parking is available at Phillips Rd. Approximately 1,000 feet (300 m) southeast of Phillips Road, the trail passes under the steel truss bridge of the old Lehigh Valley Railroad, now the multiuse Lehigh Valley Trail. As the Auburn Railroad was built forty years before the Lehigh Valley, the newer road was obligated to build its bridge over the older line. The Dryer Trail crosses There is available parking in the nearby FLCC facility and in Lehigh Crossing Park.

The Auburn Trail continues southeast from the Lehigh Valley, passing Victor-Mendon Road (Rt. 251) and Rawson Road to School Road in the Village of Victor. Limited parking is available at NY251 and at Rawson Rd. The Seneca Trail shares some of this section as it crosses the Auburn Trail. The Trolley Trail also shares with both along here. Here, the Auburn Trail detours briefly from the old Auburn Road, to bypass an active rail siding. The trail follows School Street northeast for a short distance, before turning southeast on the old Rochester & Eastern Rapid Railway right-of-way. This interurban electric railway ran trolleys from Rochester to Auburn from 1906 to 1930, and the Auburn Trail follows the right-of-way for 0.5 miles (0.80 km) from School Street to Maple Avenue in the Village of Victor. The trail then follows Maple Street south to the intersection with the Auburn Railroad alignment at Railroad Street. The trail continues to the southeast past the old Victor Passenger Station of the Auburn Railroad, now a shop. Parking is available at the far end of the lot here. A trailhead kiosk is at Maple St.

East of the old station, the trail continues on past Ketchum Street/Proximity Lane to Brace Road, by Break of Day Road and onto East Victor Road. Limited parking is at both Brace and Break of Day Roads. This section was fully opened in late 2018. The trail then continues to the east, entering the Town of Farmington, crosses over Mud Creek on an enormous railroad embankment and then passes by the former railroad hamlet of Mertensia, NY. Parking is available in Farmington's Mertensia Park.

The 2 mi (3.2 km) Farmington portion of the Auburn Trail crosses Mertensia Road and follows through a modern subdivision to Boughton Hill Road (County Road 41.) The trail then goes past the undeveloped Beaver Creek Park and onto the Canandaigua-Farmington Townline Road, where it temporarily ends. There is an alternative branch trail to NY Route 332. Most of this section opened in 2019.

=== Future ===
The town of Canandaigua together with the City of Canandaigua have completed a plan in 2012 for completing that link in the Auburn Trail. They are now seeking funding sources. In the city, Ontario Pathways is planning extending their trail northwest to meet this section.

== Auburn Trail in Brighton and Pittsford ==
Portions of the old Auburn Railroad alignment in the Towns of Brighton and Pittsford, Monroe County, NY are also open to the public as trails. One portion, about 2.7 miles (4.3 km), runs through Brighton from Highland Avenue at Village Lane, south past Elmwood Avenue to Allens Creek Road, parallel to and just east of Interstate 590 (that portion of the interstate was originally the bed of the Enlarged Erie Canal, and, after the canal was rerouted south of Rochester, the alignment of the ill-fated Rochester Subway.)

Southeast of Allens Creek Road the alignment of the old Auburn Railroad passes behind various commercial properties on the east side of Monroe Avenue. The Auburn Trail resumes as a right-of-way through open land approximately 0.5 miles (0.80 km) southeast of Clover Street in the Town of Pittsford. The trail crosses French Road and continues into the Village of Pittsford, connecting with the Erie Canal trail at Grove Street. The old Auburn Railroad continued through the Grove Street area (the old railroad station is currently part of the Del Monte Hotel), crossing North Main Street (Route 96) and continuing parallel to, and east of, Schoen Place.

Another section of the Auburn Railroad in Pittsford is currently usable as a trail, starting on Pittsford-Palmyra Road (Route 31) approximately 1,000 feet (300 m) east of the State Street bridge over the Erie Canal, and approximately opposite the intersection of Route 31 and Wood Creek Drive. The Auburn trail picks up at this point and follows the old railroad alignment south, past Mitchell Road. This short section of the Auburn trail, about 0.5 miles (0.80 km) in length, ends at the Erie Canal Trail. The abutments for the trestle that once carried the Auburn Railroad over the Canal are still visible.

Another stub of the Auburn trail can be found on the south side of the former trestle over the Erie Canal, starting on Knickerbocker Road, about 600 feet (180 m) south of East Jefferson Road (Route 96.) This section of the trail continues 0.75 miles (1.21 km) south to Mill Road, about 1,000 feet (300 m) southwest of East Street. The old Auburn Railroad followed along the east side of Mill Road, and portions of the trail appear and disappear as modern development encroaches on the original alignment.

Yet another stub of the Auburn trail follows south of Thornell Road, just east of Mill Road, in Pittsford, to LaDue Circle and East Street. The trail continues to the southeast of East Street, along the south side of Park Road and continuing to the southeast behind modern housing, crossing Railroad Mills Road at Sturbridge Lane, and continuing to Railroad Mills Road and Woolston Road. The alignment of the original Auburn Railroad followed along the east side of Railroad Mills Road to Probst Road (see Victor - Farmington Route, above.)

In 2002, the Regional Trails Initiative proposed a master plan for biking and hiking trails in the Greater Rochester Area, which, among other things, recommended connecting up the different stubs of the Auburn trail in Brighton and Pittsford, to join the more fully developed Victor - Farmington trail.

== Historic Topographical Maps of the Auburn Railroad ==
A topographic map dated 1900, posted online by the University Of New Hampshire, shows the Auburn Railroad, now the Auburn Trail, from Railroad Mills Road to the Lehigh Valley Railroad Junction. Another topographical map posted by the same source shows the Auburn Railroad in Victor, while a third shows the Farmington portion of the railroad. An 1895 topographical map, posted by the same source, shows the Auburn Railroad as it passes through Brighton and Pittsford to the Erie Canal.
