= Orange Heritage Trailway =

Rail trail in Orange County, New York

- Orange Heritage Trailway near Chester, New York
- Length: 19.5 mi (31.4 km)
- Location: Orange County, New York
- Trailheads: East Main Street, Middletown 41°26′45.6″N 74°24′47.8″W; St James Place, Goshen; Chester Train Station, Chester; Park-N-Ride, Blooming Grove; Millpond Parkway, Monroe; Clark Street, Monroe; River Road, Harriman 41°18′40.4″N 74°9′8.8″W

The Orange Heritage Trailway is a 19.5-mile (31.4 km) rail trail in Orange County, New York, that runs along the roadbed of the Erie Railroad's Main Line from Harriman, NY to nearby Middletown.

== History ==
Norfolk Southern freight train with parallel Orange Heritage Trailway in Chester, near the NYS&W bridge.

Between 1906 and 1909, the Erie Railroad constructed the Graham Line as a freight bypass around the congested Erie mainline between Harriman and Otisville, NY. In 1983, Conrail chose to abandon the mainline tracks in favor of the Graham Line, which is still used by Metro-North's Port Jervis Line and freight operator Norfolk Southern Railway. This longer route was the preferred route when local opposition to Metro-North caused the historically important Erie Main Line to be abandoned from Harriman to Middletown. After the abandonment, Orange County acquired the segment from Wallkill River to Harriman, omitting the segment in Goshen. A local non-profit, Orange Pathways worked with the County to development the line as a multiuse trail. Construction on the first segment of trail began in 1991, becoming the first multi-use trail in Orange County.

The former Erie Railroad mainline turns northwest at Newburgh Junction (Harriman) and tracks terminate at the site of the now-removed and demolished Nepera Chemical plant in the village of Harriman. The undeveloped roadbed continues for less than a mile, past the now demolished old Harriman station until River Road where the paved trail begins, with an informal trailhead and parking lot located at the corner of River Rd. and North Main St.

There is a Norfolk Southern siding off the NYS&W mainline near Chester that runs along the rail trail for about 0.5 miles. This siding is all that remains of Greycourt, which was once the site of a sizeable railroad yard and an interchange point between the Erie Railroad and the L&HR. Greycourt is also where the Erie Railroad's Newburgh Branch split from the mainline.

The trail earned the designation of "National Recreation Trail" in June 2007.

== Trail death ==
In 1999, Paul Harnisch, an assistant district attorney for Orange County, was charged with murder for striking two skaters, killing one of them, while driving illegally on the trail in the Chester area. Harnish drove for a half-mile with the dead skater on the hood of his vehicle. He was found not guilty for reason of insanity and remanded to the custody of a psychiatric hospital for a period of years.
