= Catskill Scenic Trail =

Rail trail in Delaware County, New York, US

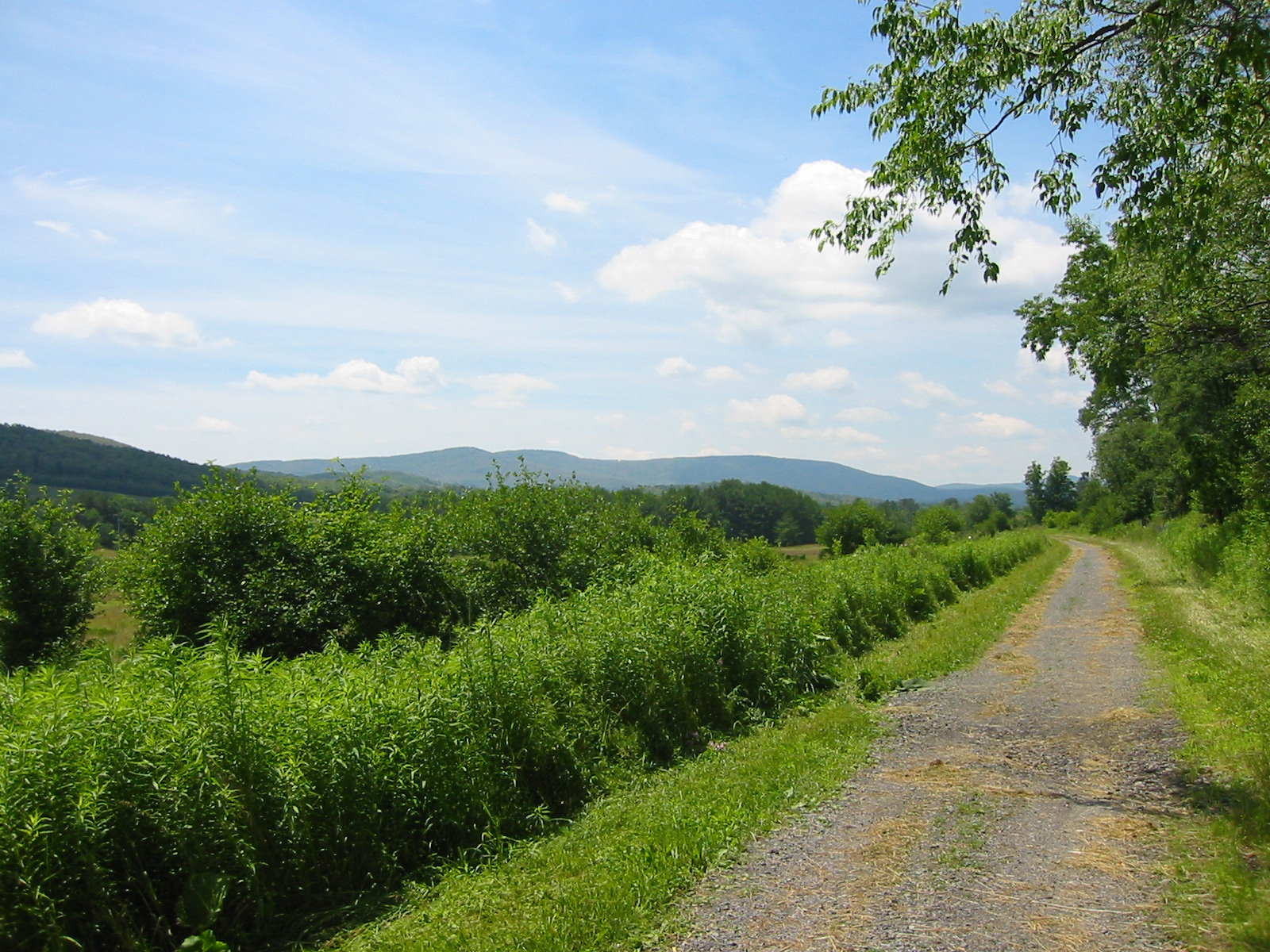
- Catskill Scenic Trail in 2007 with scenic farmland and mountains.
- Location: Delaware County, New York
- Use: hiking, cycling, snowmobiling, skiing
- Right of way: Ulster and Delaware Railroad
- Maintained by: Catskill Revitalization Corporation
- Website: http://catskillscenictrail.org

The Catskill Scenic Trail is a multi-use rail trail along the former Ulster and Delaware Railroad right-of-way in rural Delaware County, New York. It runs approximately 19 miles (31 km) from Grand Gorge, New York (42°21′29.2″N 74°30′29.3″W) to Bloomville, New York (42°19′55.6″N 74°48′13.0″W). The western portion of the trail runs along the West Branch of the Delaware River. The eastern portion of the trail has recently been extended approximately 7 miles (11 km) to Roxbury, New York, to the south of Grand Gorge.

The trail serves mainly bikers and hikers in the warmer months and snowmobilers and cross country skiers in the winter months. It is owned by the Delaware and Ulster Railroad tourist railroad and maintained by the non-profit Catskill Revitalization Corporation.

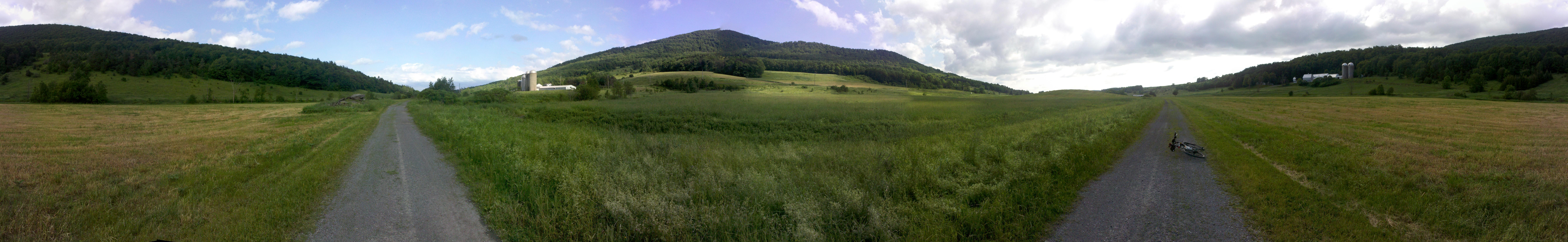

== Gallery ==
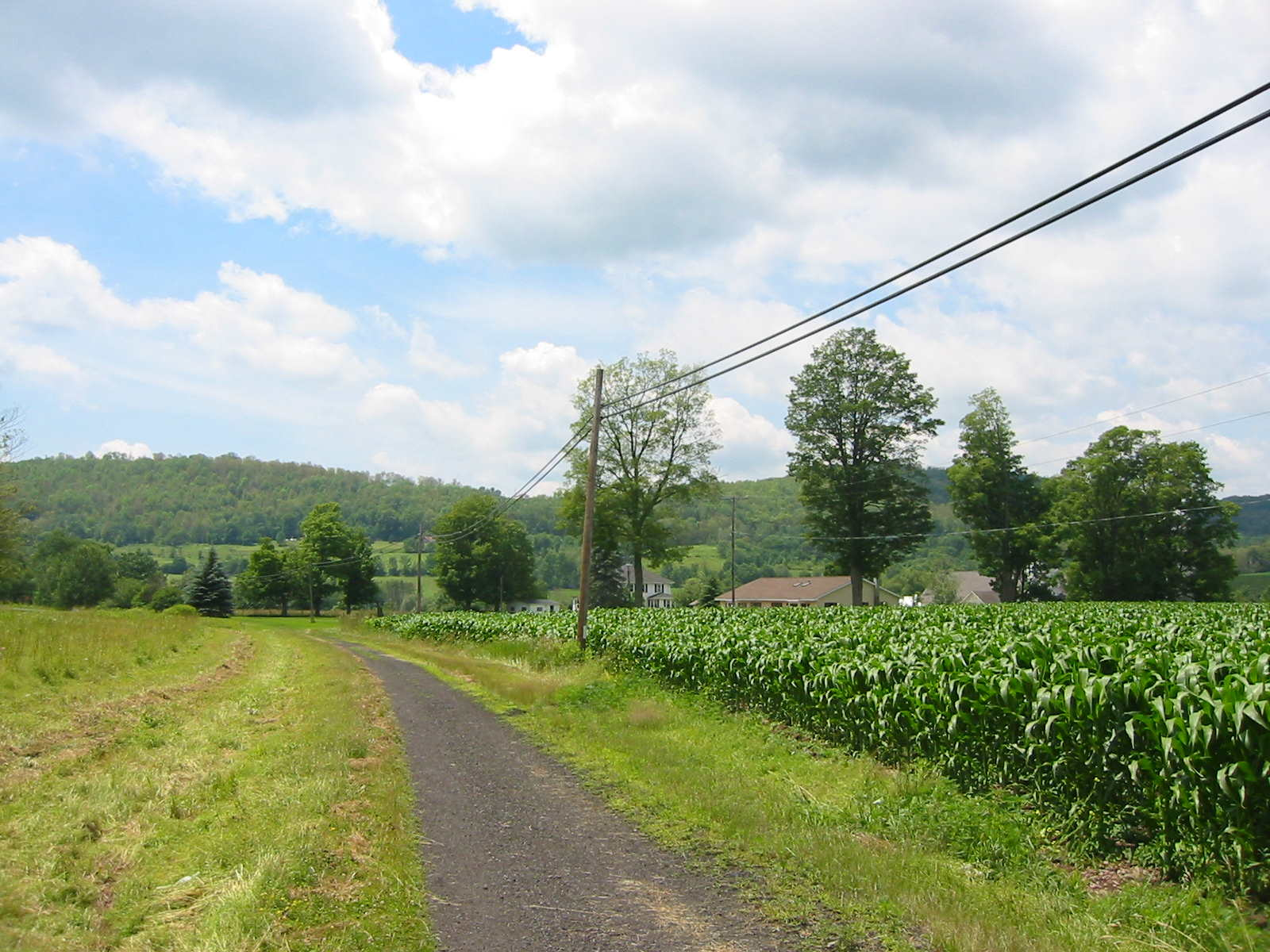
Catskill Scenic Trail as it passes through a farm.

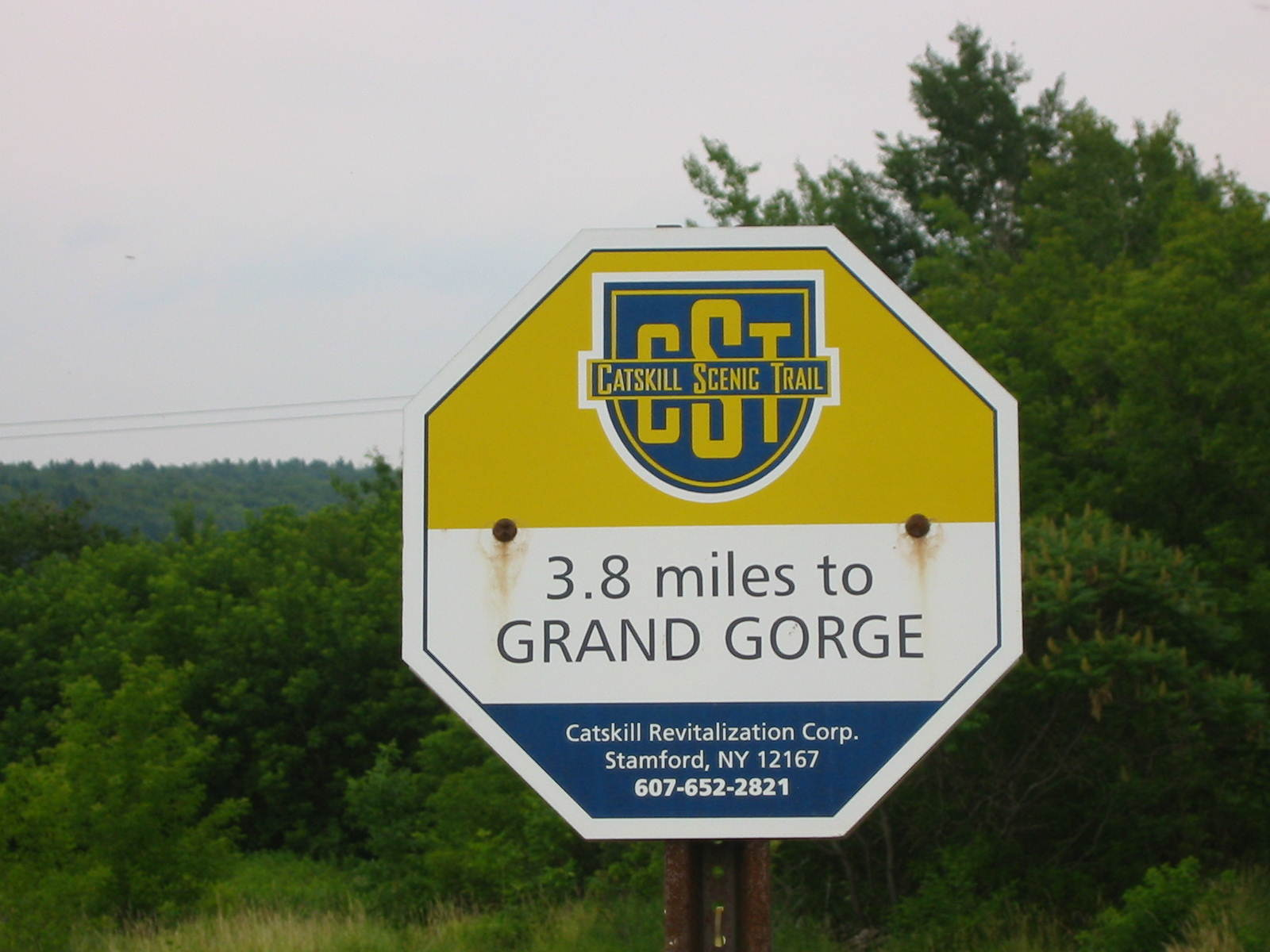
Catskill Scenic Trail sign
