= Allegheny River Valley Trail =

Rail trail in New York, United States

Coordinates: 42°4′59″N 78°29′3″W

- Length: 5.6 mi (9.0 km)
- Location: Allegany County, New York; Cattaraugus County, New York
- Trailheads: Allegany, New York; Olean, New York

The Allegheny River Valley Trail is a 5.6-mile (9.0 km) rail trail in Cattaraugus County in western New York, United States. It was built on portions of the former Western New York and Pennsylvania Railway. It has two "loops" the main loop that crosses through Gargoyle Park, West State Street, Constitution Ave, as well as Saint Bonaventure University. There is a shorter alternative loop called the Saint Francis Loop which is 2.6 miles, loops around Saint Bonaventure's campus. The trail was the brainchild of Joe & Cecily Higgins and opened in 1998.
