= Cato–Fair Haven Trail =

Trail in New York, United States

The Cato–Fair Haven Trail extends 14.5 miles (23.3 km) from the Town of Cato to Fair Haven, New York. It was built along part of a line within the Auburn Division of the Lehigh Valley Railroad.

== Parking ==
In Cato there is a parking lot next to the town offices (a new building resembling the station that used to be on that site). The sign there says "No Wheeled Vehicles" even though it encourages bicycling on the trail. 43°10′6″N 76°34′34″W

In Fair Haven there is parking on the south side of NY 104A.

== Maintenance ==
Several bridges have been removed and replaced by ramps, or in one instance, a culvert. The trail is maintained by Cayuga County.
