= List of historical highway markers in Hampshire County, West Virginia =

This is a list of historical highway markers in Hampshire County, in the U.S. state of West Virginia.

== West Virginia Memory Project markers ==
These markers were erected as part of the West Virginia Highway Historical Marker Program, which is currently managed by West Virginia Archives and History, a part of the West Virginia Division of Culture and History.

=== Capon Springs ===
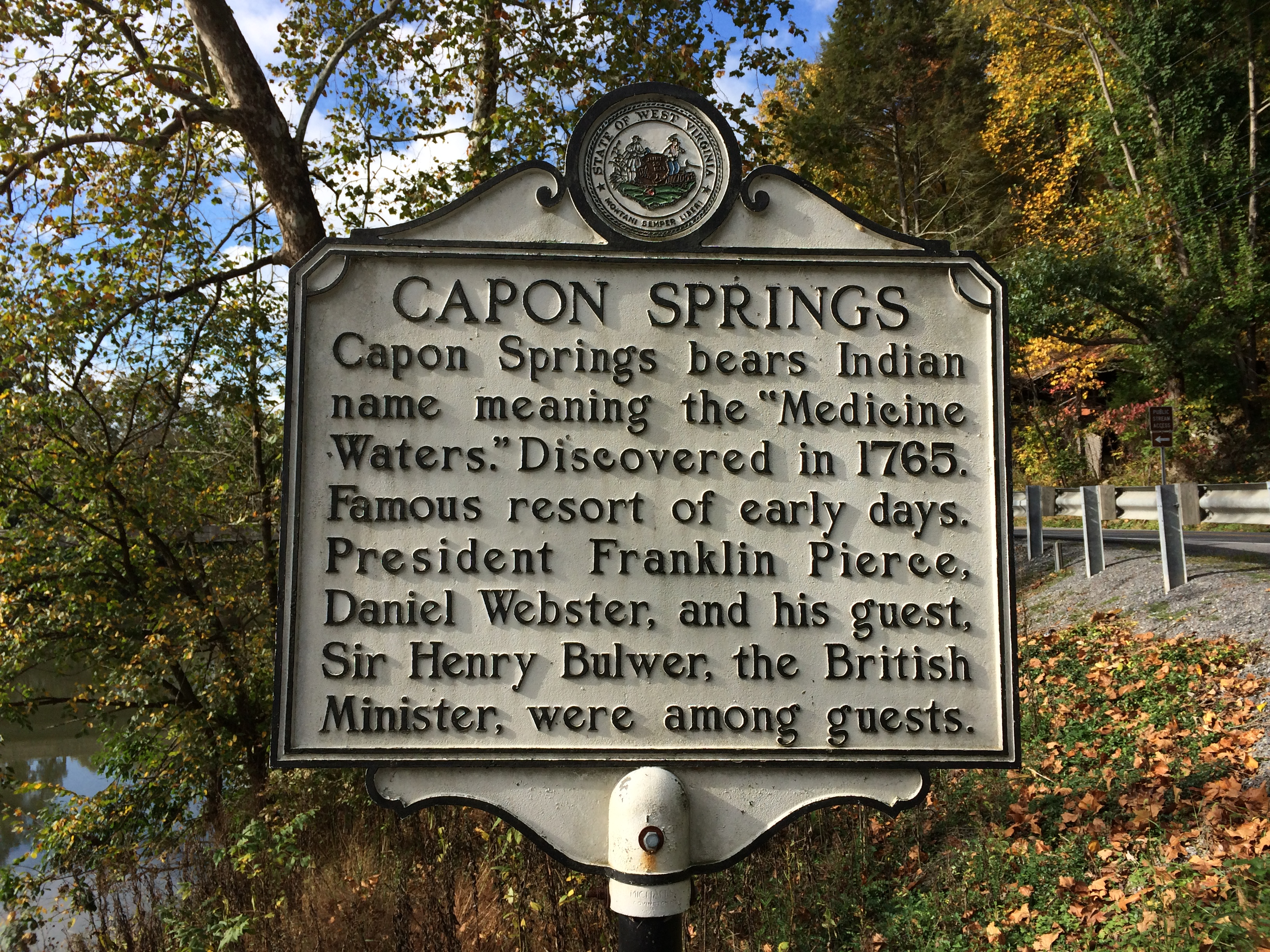
Capon Springs marker

Title: Capon Springs

Inscription: Capon Springs bears Indian name meaning the "Medicine Waters." Discovered in 1765. Famous resort of early days. President Franklin Pierce, Daniel Webster, and his guest, Sir Henry Bulwer, the British Minister, were among guests.

Location: West Virginia Route 259, Capon Lake

=== West Virginia/Virginia ===
Title: West Virginia/Virginia

Inscription: "The Mountain State"—western part of the Commonwealth of Virginia until June 20, 1863. Settled by the Germans and Scotch-Irish. It became a line of defense between the English and French during the French and Indian War, 1754-1763.

Named for Queen Elizabeth, the Virgin Queen of England. Site of the first permanent English settlement, 1607, in America. One of the 13 original colonies. Virginia is the birthplace of eight Presidents of the United States.

Location: West Virginia Route 259, at state line

=== Northwestern Turnpike ===
Title: Northwestern Turnpike

Inscription: In 1784, Washington proposed the Northwestern Turnpike as an all-Virginia route to the Ohio. Authorized in 1827 and started in 1831, it remains a monument to the skill of its engineers, Charles Shaw and Colonel Claudius Crozet.

Location: U.S. Route 50, Capon Bridge

=== Fort Edwards ===
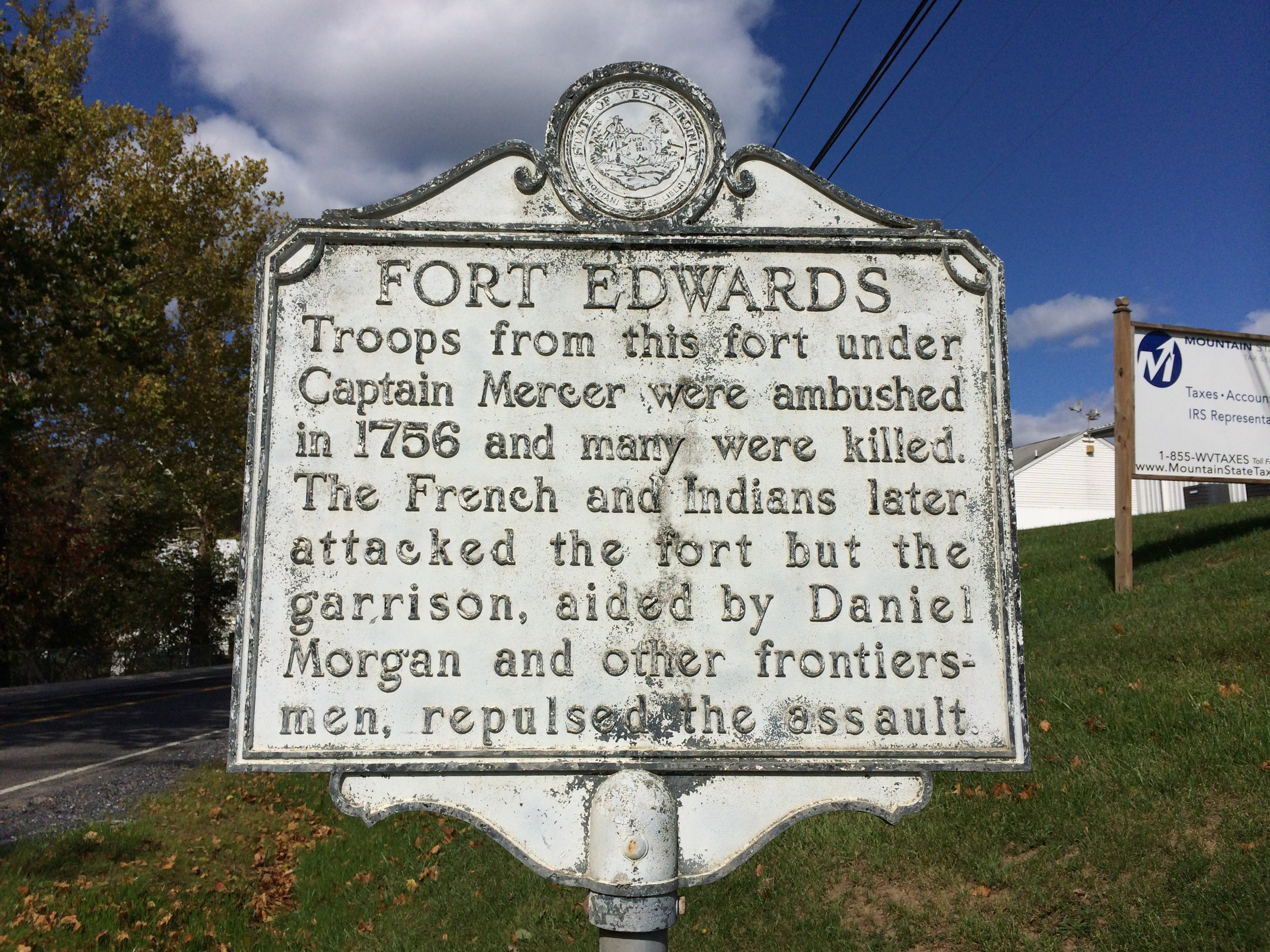
Fort Edwards marker

Title: Fort Edwards

Inscription: Troops from this fort under Captain Mercer were ambushed in 1756 and many were killed. The French and Indians later attacked the fort but the garrison, aided by Daniel Morgan and other frontiersmen, repulsed the assault.

Location: U.S. Route 50, near junction with County Route 14 (Cacapon River Road), Capon Bridge

=== Ice Mountain ===
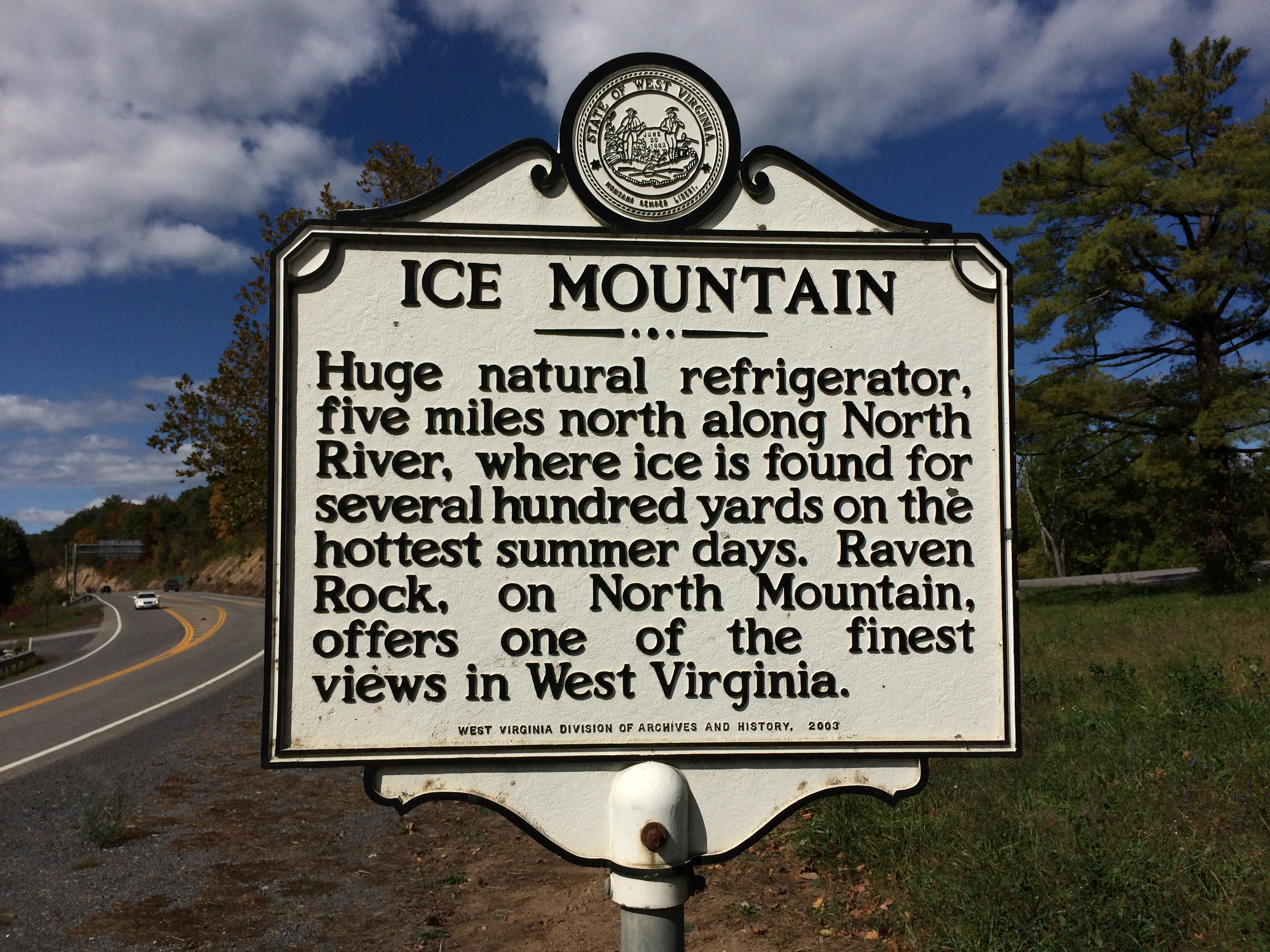
Ice Mountain marker

Title: Ice Mountain

Inscription: Huge natural refrigerator, five miles north along North River, where ice is found for several hundred yards on the hottest summer days. Raven Rock, on North Mountain, offers one of the finest views in West Virginia.

Location: U.S. Route 50, at junction with West Virginia Route 29 North

=== Mount Bethel Church ===
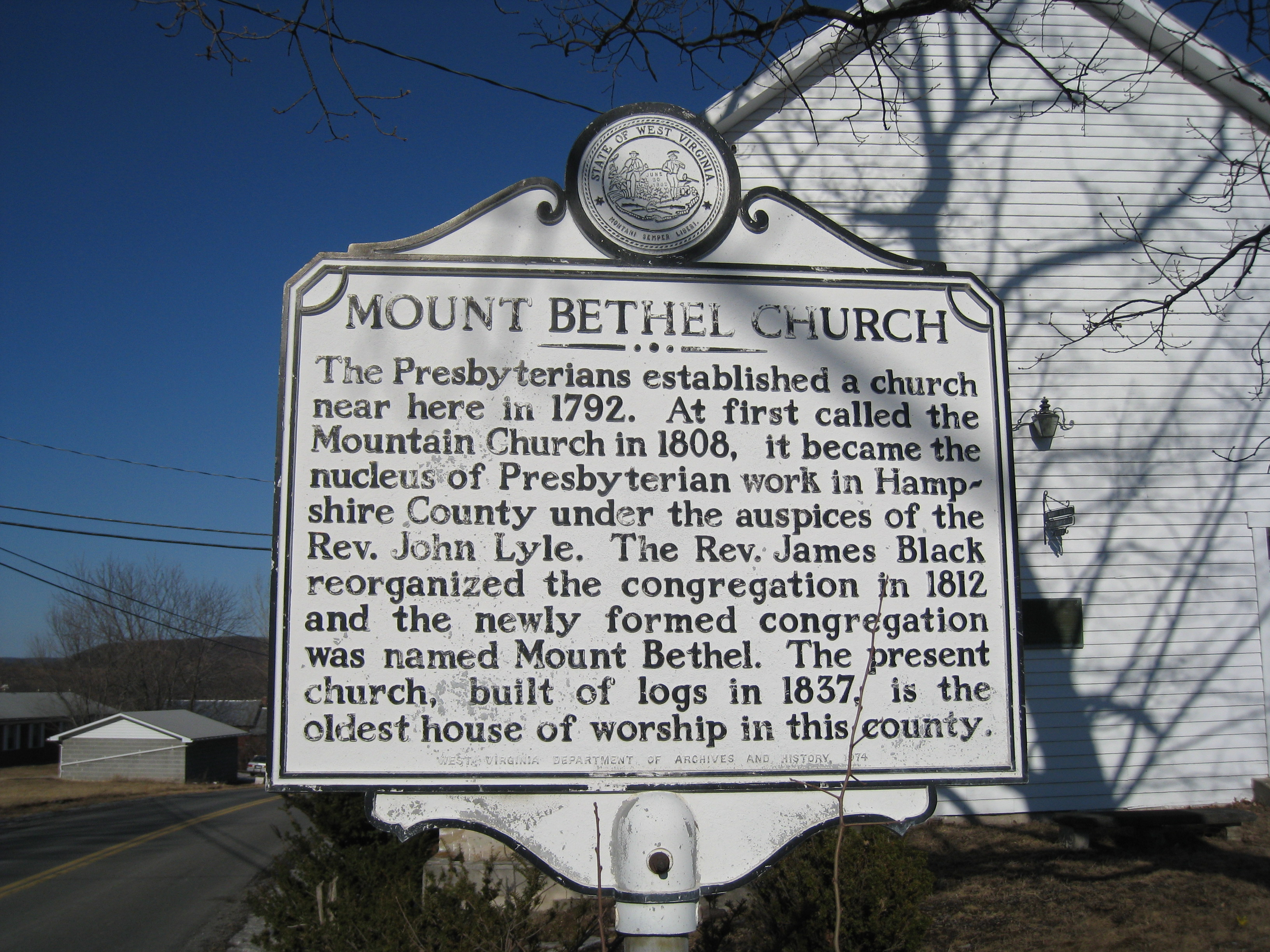
Mount Bethel Church marker

Title: Mount Bethel Church

Inscription: The Presbyterians established a church near here in 1792. At first called the Mountain Church in 1808, it became the nucleus of Presbyterian work in Hampshire County under the auspices of the Rev. John Lyle. The Rev. James Black reorganized the congregation in 1812 and the newly formed congregation was named Mount Bethel. The present church, built of logs in 1837, is the oldest house of worship in this county.

Location: County Route 5 (Jersey Mountain Road), at junction with County Route 5/4 (Three Churches Hollow Road), Three Churches

=== Bloomery Gap Skirmish/Bloomery Iron Furnace ===
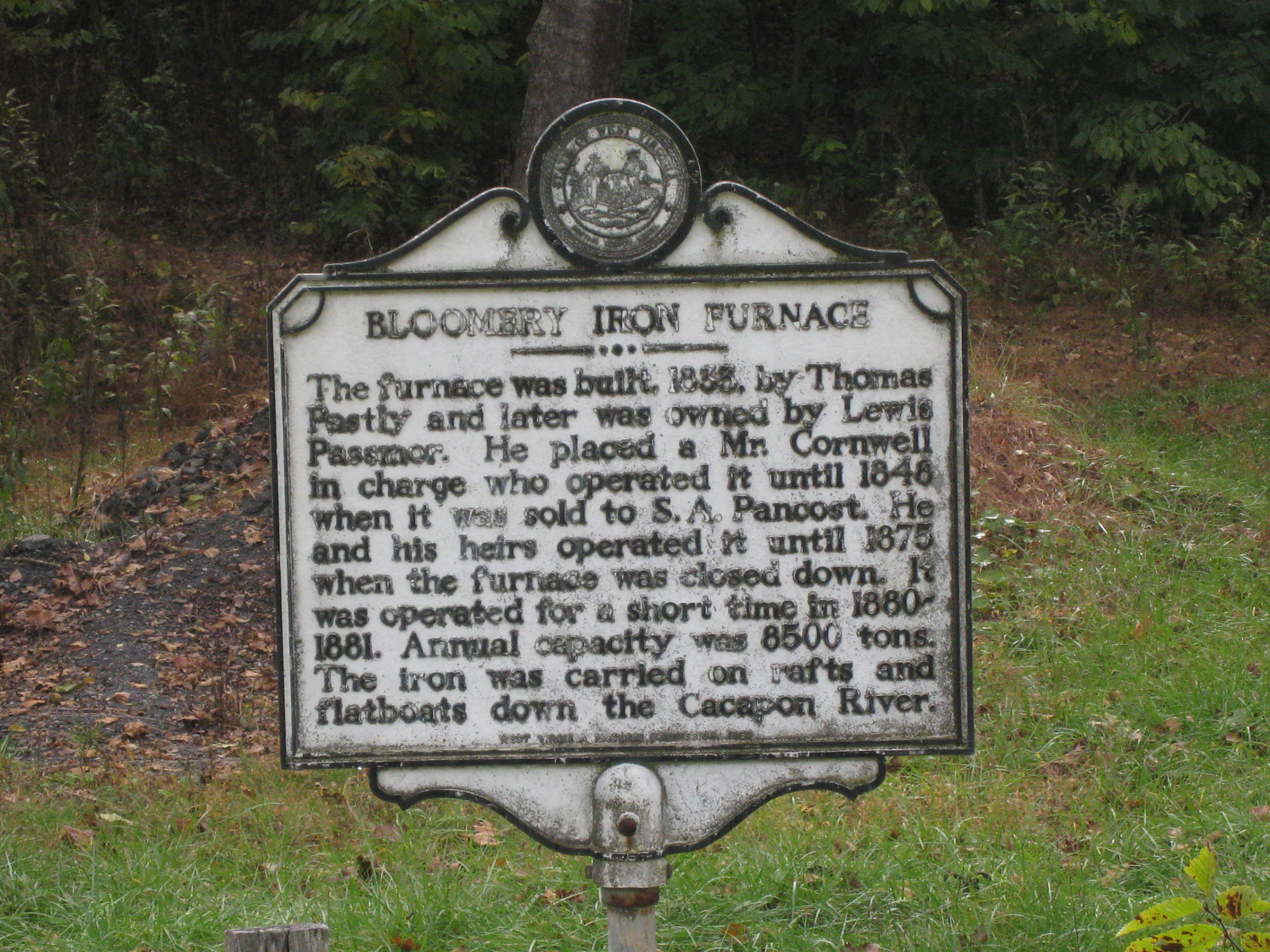
Bloomery Iron Furnace marker

Title: Bloomery Gap Skirmish/Bloomery Iron Furnace

Inscription: February 14, 1862, Brigadier General Frederick W. Lander, commanding the 5th and 8th Ohio, 14th Indiana Infantry, and 400 men of the 1st West Virginia Cavalry, attacked a Confederate brigade of the 31st, 51st, 67th, and 89th Virginia Militia under Colonel J. Sencendiver. The Confederates were routed and fled toward Winchester. Lander returned to his camp at Paw Paw and Sencendiver again occupied Bloomery Gap.

The furnace was built, 1833, by Thomas Pastly and later was owned by Lewis Passmor. He placed a Mr. Cornwell in charge who operated it until 1848 when it was sold to S. A. Pancost. He and his heirs operated it until 1875 when the furnace was closed down. It was operated for a short time in 1880-1881. Annual capacity was 8500 tons. The iron was carried on rafts and flatboats down the Cacapon River.

Location: West Virginia Route 127 (Bloomery Pike), 2 miles east of junction with West Virginia Route 29

=== Oriskany Sand ===
Title: Oriskany Sand

Inscription: The massive sandstone forming the top of the exposure and the great arch is the Oriskany and the limestone below it is the Helderberg of the driller and geologist. The "Oriskany Sand", an important gas sand, has produced in excess of a trillion cubic feet of gas in West Virginia.

Location: U.S. Route 50/West Virginia Route 28, two miles west of Romney (missing)

=== Hampshire County/Virginia ===
Title: Hampshire County/Virginia

Inscription: Oldest county; established by the Virginia Assembly, 1754. Formed from Frederick and Augusta. Lord Fairfax, owner, named it for the English shire of the same name. Ice Mountain and Hanging Rocks are among its natural wonders.

Named for Queen Elizabeth, the Virgin Queen of England. Site of the first permanent English settlement, 1607, in America. One of the 13 original colonies. Virginia is the birthplace of eight Presidents of the United States.

Location: West Virginia Route 127 (Bloomery Pike), at state line (missing)

=== Hampshire County/Morgan County ===
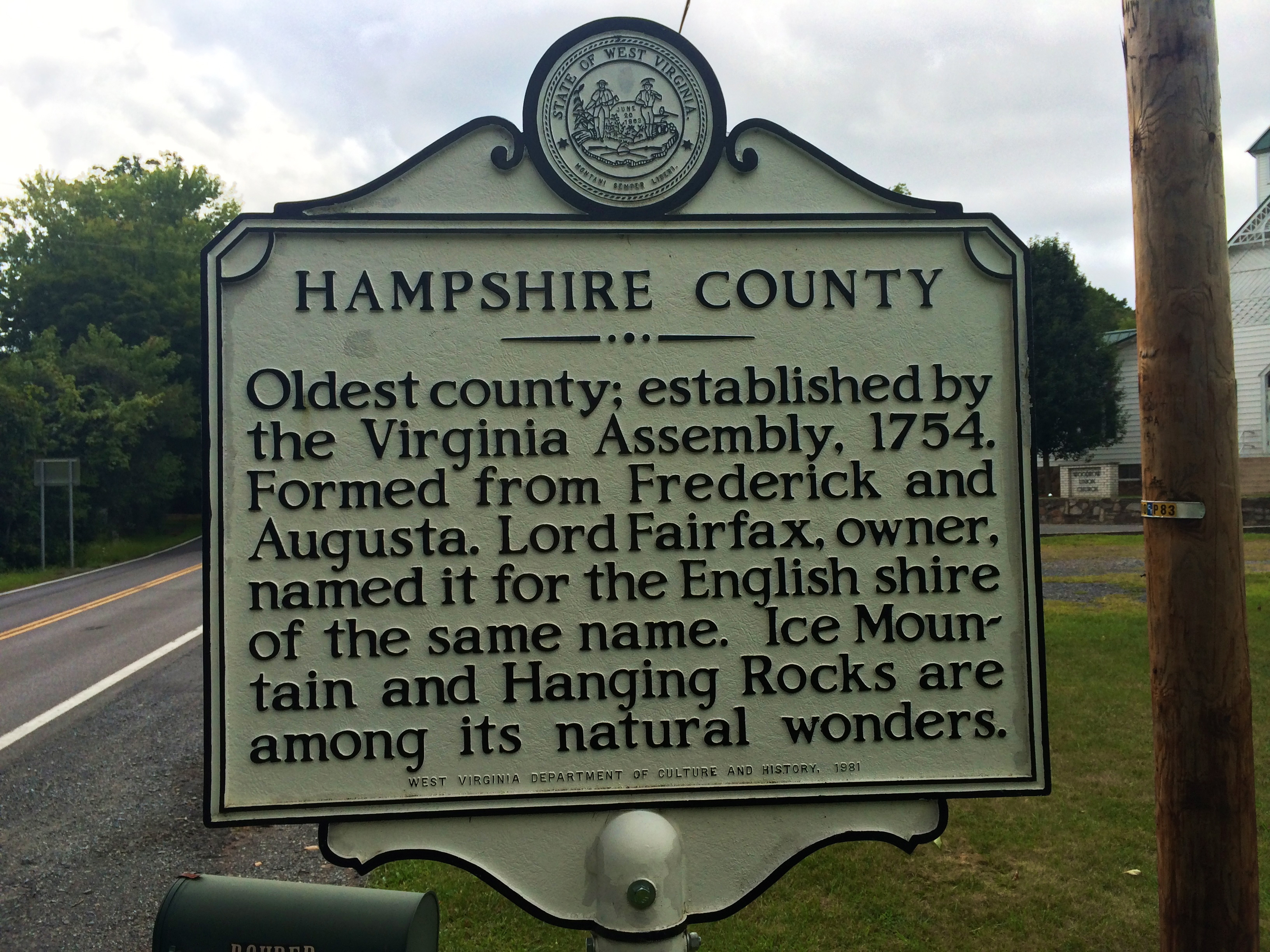
Hampshire County marker

Title: Hampshire County/Morgan County

Inscription: Oldest county; established by the Virginia Assembly, 1754. Formed from Frederick and Augusta. Lord Fairfax, owner, named it for the English shire of the same name. Ice Mountain and Hanging Rocks are among its natural wonders.

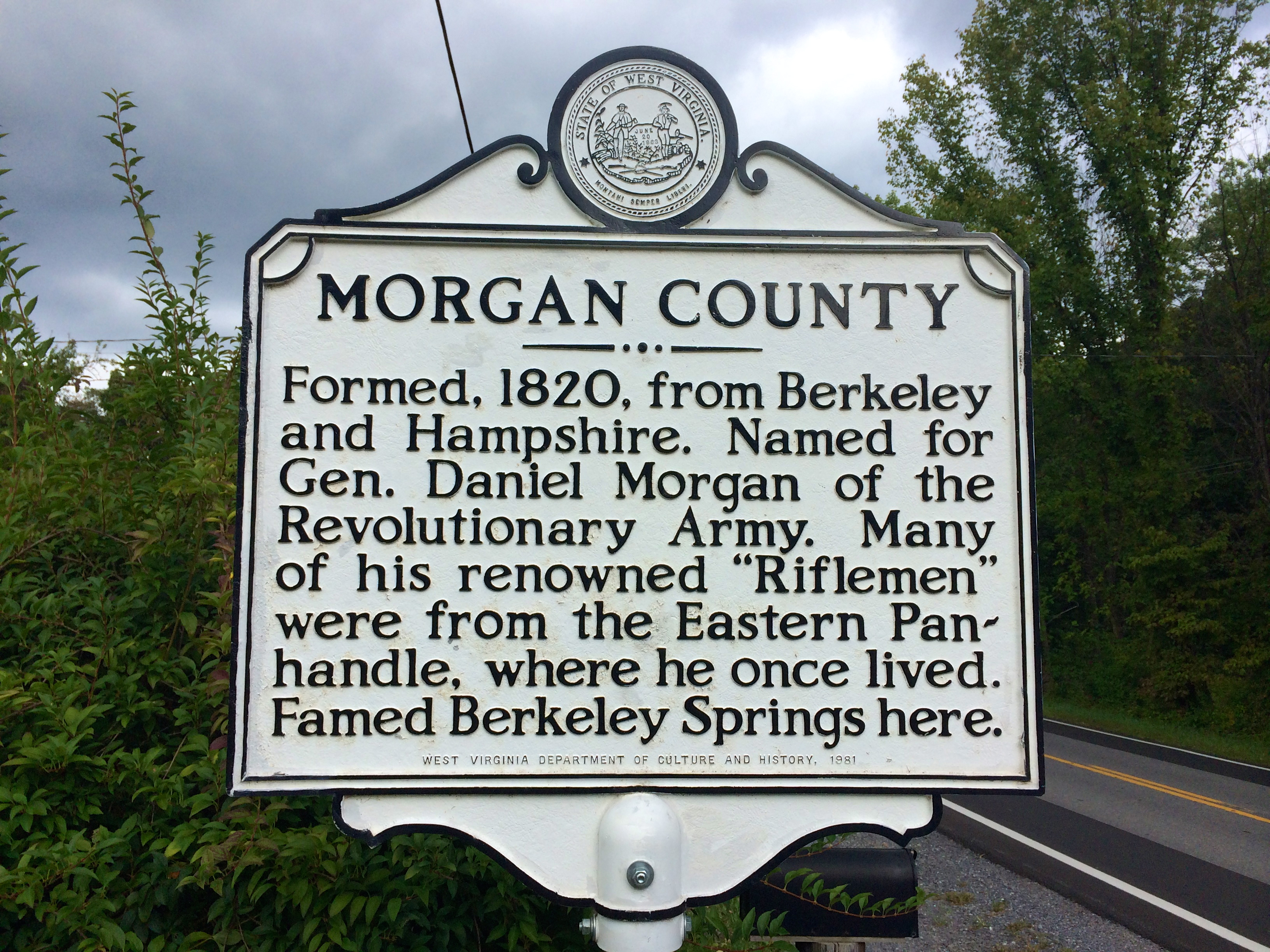
Morgan County marker

Formed, 1820, from Berkeley and Hampshire. Named for Gen. Daniel Morgan of the Revolutionary Army. Many of his renowned "Riflemen" were from the Eastern Panhandle, where he once lived. Famed Berkeley Springs here.

Location: West Virginia Route 9 West

=== Caudy's Castle ===
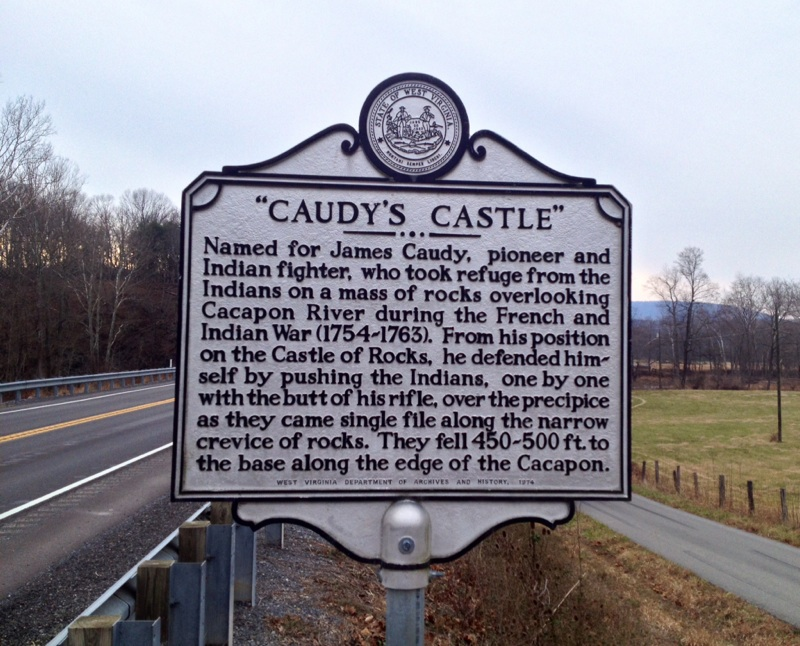
Caudy's Castle marker

Title: Caudy's Castle

Inscription: Named for James Caudy, pioneer and Indian fighter, who took refuge from the Indians on a mass of rocks overlooking Cacapon River during the French and Indian War (1754–1763). From his position on the Castle of Rocks, he defended himself by pushing the Indians, one by one with the butt of his rifle, over the precipice as they came single file along the narrow crevice of rocks. They fell 450–500 feet to the base along the edge of the Cacapon.

Location: West Virginia Route 127 (Bloomery Pike), 1.5 miles east of West Virginia Route 29

=== Hampshire County/Morgan County ===
Title: Hampshire County/Morgan County

Inscription: Oldest county; established by the Virginia Assembly, 1754. Formed from Frederick and Augusta. Lord Fairfax, owner, named it for the English shire of the same name. Ice Mountain and Hanging Rocks are among its natural wonders.

Formed, 1820, from Berkeley and Hampshire. Named for Gen. Daniel Morgan of the Revolutionary Army. Many of his renowned "Riflemen" were from the Eastern Panhandle, where he once lived. Famed Berkeley Springs here.

Location: West Virginia Route 9 East (missing)

=== Braddock's Gap ===
Title: Braddock's Gap

Inscription: To the north, route of General Braddock's army in May, 1755, on way to attack the French at Fort Duquesne. His troops encamped at both Fort Capon and Fort Cox near here before resuming the journey which ended in defeat and death.

Location: U.S. Route 50 and West Virginia Route 29 (Bloomery Pike), near Pleasant Dale (missing)

=== Oriskany Sand ===
Title: Oriskany Sand

Inscription: The massive sandstone forming the top of the exposure and the great arch is the Oriskany and the limestone below it is the Helderberg of the driller and geologist. The "Oriskany Sand", an important gas sand, has produced in excess of a trillion cubic feet of gas in West Virginia.

Location: U.S. Route 50 and County Road 21, about 2 miles east of Pleasant Dale (missing)

=== Blue's Gap ===
Title: Blue's Gap Battle

Inscription: Confederate troops under Captain George F. Sheets were defeated by Colonel S. H. Dunning's 5th Ohio Infantry here, Jan. 7, 1862. North River Bridge and a number of buildings were burned by the Federals.

Location: U.S. Route 50, 14 miles east of Romney (missing)

=== West Virginia/Virginia ===
Title: West Virginia/Virginia

Inscription: "The Mountain State"—western part of the Commonwealth of Virginia until June 20, 1863. Settled by the Germans and Scotch-Irish. It became a line of defense between the English and French during the French and Indian War, 1754-1763.

Named for Queen Elizabeth, the Virgin Queen of England. Site of the first permanent English settlement, 1607, in America. One of the 13 original colonies. Virginia is the birthplace of eight Presidents of the United States.

Location: U.S. Route 50, at state line (missing)

=== Hampshire County/Hardy County ===
Title: Hampshire County/Hardy County

Inscription: Oldest county; established by the Virginia Assembly, 1754. Formed from Frederick and Augusta. Lord Fairfax, owner, named it for the English shire of the same name. Ice Mountain and Hanging Rocks are among its natural wonders.

Formed from Hampshire in 1786. Named for distinguished Virginian, Samuel Hardy. In 1725, John Van Meter of New York visited the South Branch Valley. He praised it highly, so his sons acquired land and settled at Old Fields.

Location: U.S. Route 50, at county line near Intermont (missing)

=== High Knob ===
Title: High Knob

Inscription: This peak on Hampshire-Hardy line rises a thousand feet above the surrounding hills to a height of more than half a mile. From it can be seen points in three counties. It overlooks "The Trough," famed for its history and scenery.

Location: U.S. Route 220 (northbound) south of Hickory Hill Road, near Hampshire-Hardy border

=== Oriskany Sand ===
Title: Oriskany Sand

Inscription: The massive sandstone forming the top of the exposure and the great arch is the Oriskany and the limestone below it is the Helderberg of the driller and geologist. The "Oriskany Sand", an important gas sand, has produced in excess of a trillion cubic feet of gas in West Virginia.

Location: West Virginia Route 28 about 1.5 miles south of Springfield (missing)

=== Hanging Rocks ===
Title: Hanging Rocks

Inscription: Perpendicular cliffs rising nearly 300 feet above the South Branch of the Potomac. The scene of fierce battle between Delaware and Catawba Indians about 1736. Also scene of skirmishes between Northern and Southern troops in 1861.

Location: West Virginia Route 28, 4 miles north of Romney (missing)

=== Fort Forman ===
Title: Fort Forman

Inscription: Frontier outpost. From this county, Captain William Forman (Foreman), in 1777, led a company to the relief of Fort Henry at Wheeling. He, two sons, and many others were killed in an ambush by Indians at the "Narrows" near Moundsville.

Location: West Virginia Route 28, 3 miles north of Romney at Vance

=== Col. Claudius Crozet/Mechanicsburg Gap ===
Title: Col. Claudius Crozet/Mechanicsburg Gap

Inscription: Col. Crozet, born in France, 1790; came to America, 1816. He taught mathematics at West Point six years. Named chief engineer of Virginia (1824); surveyed Northwestern Turnpike, 1825. Died 1864; buried in Shockee Hills, Richmond.

Scenic canyon cut through Mill Creek Mountain by Mill Creek. Here an old Indian trail was the pathway from the Valley of Virginia to the Alleghenies, then the Northwestern Turnpike, now the George Washington Highway.

Location: U.S. Route 50/West Virginia Route 28, 2 miles west of Romney near Mechanicsburg

=== Indian Mound ===
Title: Indian Mound

Inscription: The Indian Mound Cemetery, which is 7 feet high and about 15 feet in diameter, is one of the largest remaining mounds in the Eastern Panhandle of West Virginia. This mound has never been excavated but similar mounds of area dug by Smithsonian Institution suggest this mound might date between A.D. 500 and 1000, and have been constructed by Hopewellian peoples.

Location: Just west of Romney, U.S. Route 50/West Virginia Route 28

=== "Stonewall" Jackson/Romney in 1861–1865 ===
Title: "Stonewall" Jackson/Romney in 1861–1865

Inscription: Jackson arrived here Jan. 13, 1862, after capturing Bath (Berkeley Springs). Leaving Gen. Loring, he returned to Winchester. Loring's protest caused Jackson to resign but he reconsidered and his Valley Campaign followed.

Sitting astride the natural invasion route from the Shenandoah Valley to the Potomac and B. & O. Railroad, Romney was scourged by both armies. No great battles were fought here, but during the War the town changed hands 56 times.

Location: Romney, Hampshire County Courthouse square, U.S. Route 50/West Virginia Route 28

=== Romney/Early Memorial ===
Title: Romney/Early Memorial

Inscription: Incorporated as a town, 1762. Owned and laid off as a town by Lord Fairfax. Named for one of the five English Channel ports. Not far away was Fort Pearsall, built, 1756, as Indian defense. Town changed military control 56 times, 1861–1865.

In 1866, Confederate Memorial Association was formed here, which on September 26, 1867, dedicated a monument to Confederate soldiers, one of the first erected anywhere. This was site of Indian cemetery long before white men came.

Location: Romney, Hampshire County Courthouse square, U.S. Route 50/West Virginia Route 28

=== W. Va. School for Deaf and Blind ===
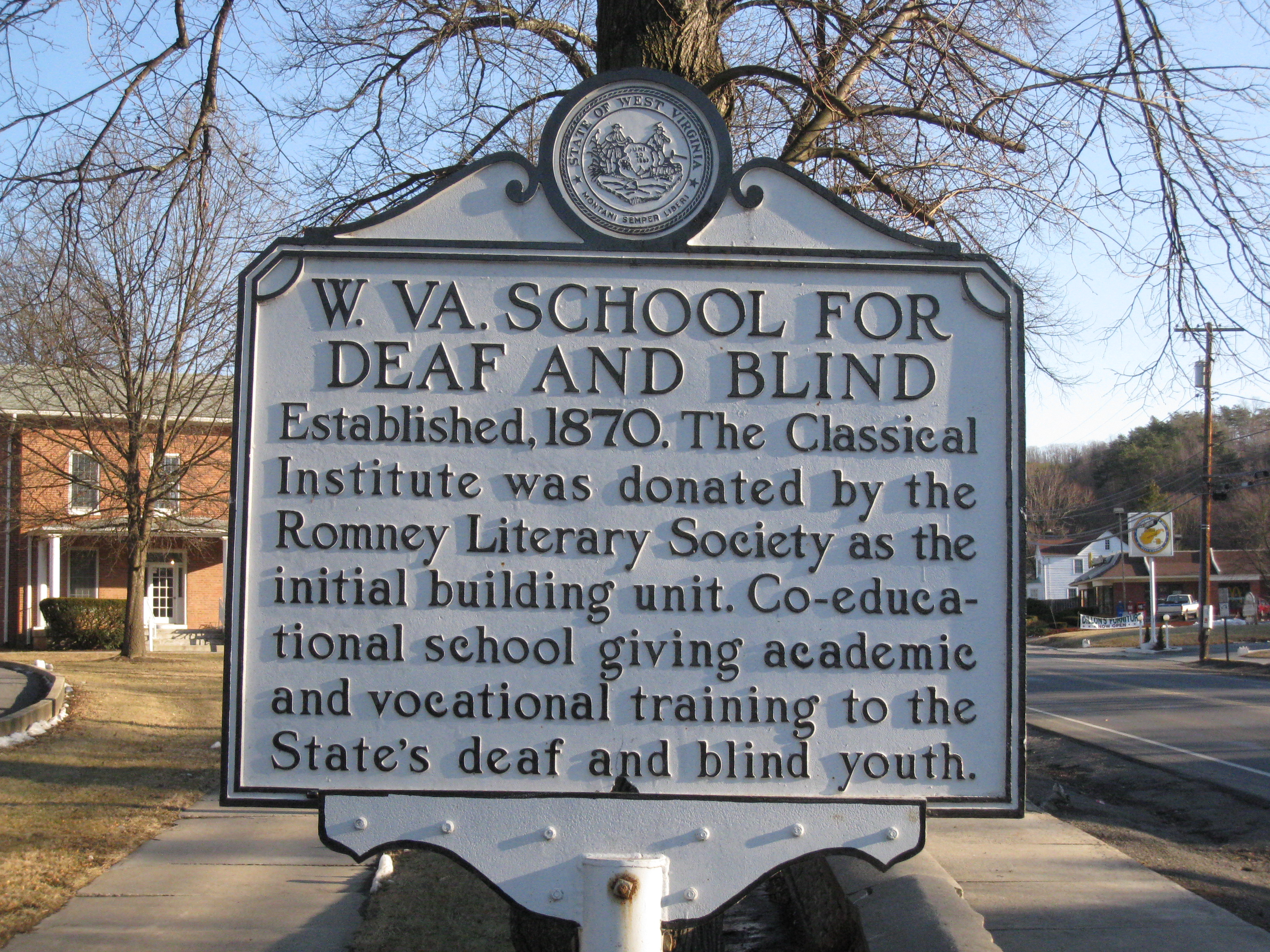
West Virginia Schools for the Deaf and Blind marker

Title: W. Va. School for Deaf and Blind

Inscription: Established, 1870. The Classical Institute was donated by the Romney Literary Society as the initial building unit. Co-educational school giving academic and vocational training to the State's deaf and blind youth.

Location: Romney, U.S. Route 50, West Virginia Schools for the Deaf and Blind campus

=== Hampshire County/Mineral County ===
Title: Hampshire County/Mineral County

Inscription: Oldest county. Authorized, 1753, in act effective, May 1, 1754. Formed from Frederick and Augusta. Lord Fairfax, owner, named it for the English shire of the same name. Ice Mountain and Hanging Rocks are among its many natural wonders.

Formed from Hampshire in 1866 and named for its great mineral deposits. In Mineral County is Fort Ashby, the only standing unit in the chain of frontier forts which were built in 1755 under George Washington's order.

Location: West Virginia Route 28 near Springfield

=== Hampshire County/Mineral County ===
Title: Hampshire County/Mineral County

Inscription: Oldest county. Authorized, 1753, in act effective, May 1, 1754. Formed from Frederick and Augusta. Lord Fairfax, owner, named it for the English shire of the same name. Ice Mountain and Hanging Rocks are among its many natural wonders.

Formed from Hampshire in 1866 and named for its great mineral deposits. In Mineral County is Fort Ashby, the only standing unit in the chain of frontier forts which were built in 1755 under George Washington's order.

Location: U.S. Route 50/U.S. Route 220 near Junction (missing)

=== Hampshire County/Hardy County ===
Title: Hampshire County/Hardy County

Inscription: Oldest county. Authorized, 1753, in act effective, May 1, 1754. Formed from Frederick and Augusta. Lord Fairfax, owner, named it for the English shire of the same name. Ice Mountain and Hanging Rocks are among its many natural wonders.

Formed from Hampshire in 1786. Named for distinguished Virginian, Samuel Hardy. In 1725, John Van Meter of New York visited the South Branch Valley. He praised it highly, so his sons acquired land and settled at Old Fields.

Location: U.S. Route 220 near Purgitsville (missing)

=== Pin Oak Fountain ===
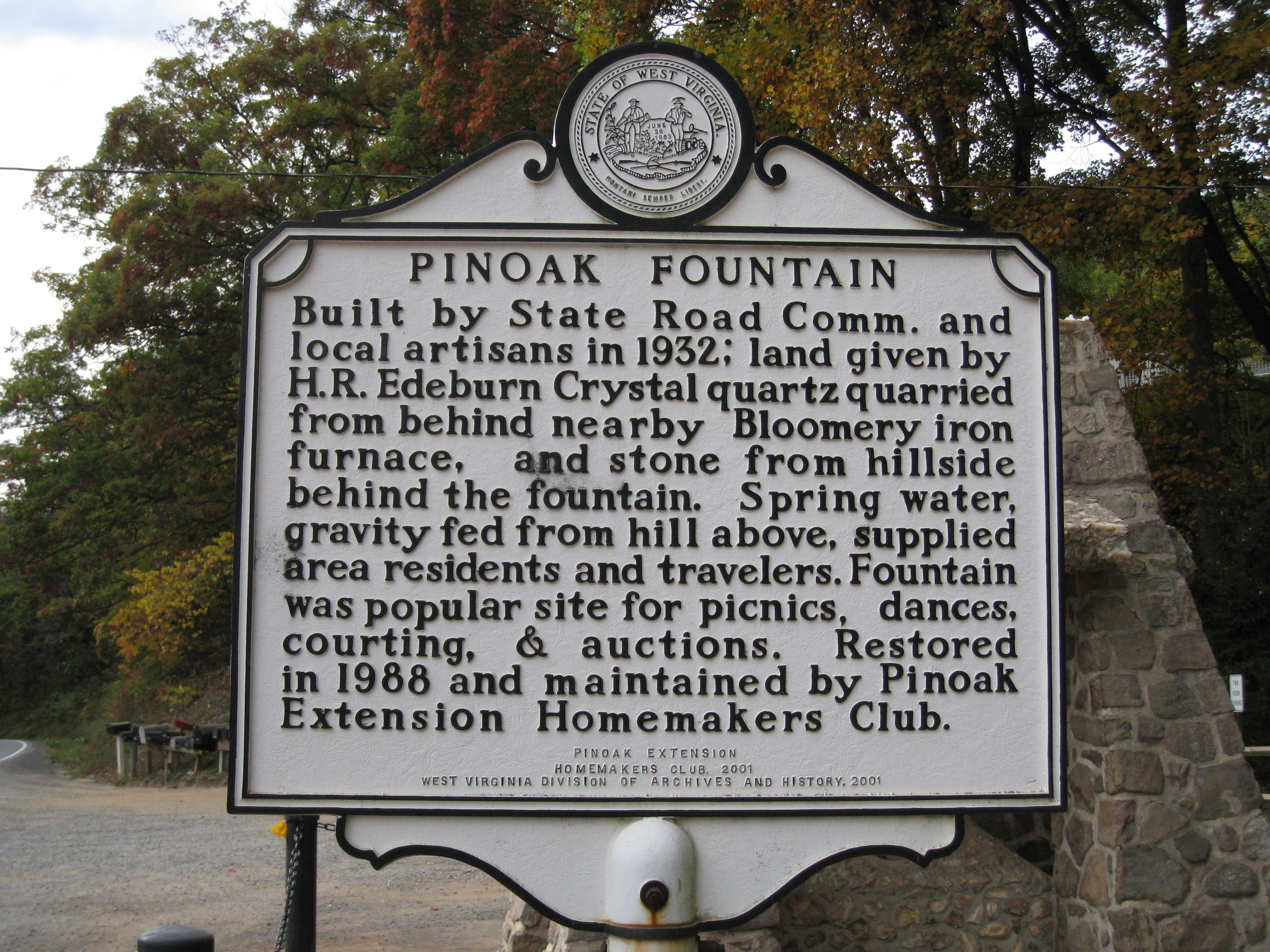
Pin Oak Fountain marker

Title: Pin Oak Fountain

Inscription: Built by State Road Comm. and local artisans in 1932; land given by H.R. Edeburn. Crystal quartz quarried from behind nearby Bloomery iron furnace, and stone from hillside behind the fountain. Spring water, gravity fed from hill above, supplied area residents and travelers. Fountain was popular site for picnics, dances, courting, & auctions. Restored in 1988 and maintained by Pin Oak Extension Homemakers Club.

Location: West Virginia Route 29, Pin Oak, eight miles south of Paw Paw

=== Ice Mountain ===
Title: Ice Mountain

Inscription: Huge natural refrigerator, five miles north along North River, where ice is found for several hundred yards on the hottest summer days. Raven Rock, on North Mountain, offers one of the finest views in West Virginia.

Location: U.S. Route 50, at junction with West Virginia Route 29 North, near Pleasant Dale

== Other markers ==
=== Capon Chapel ===
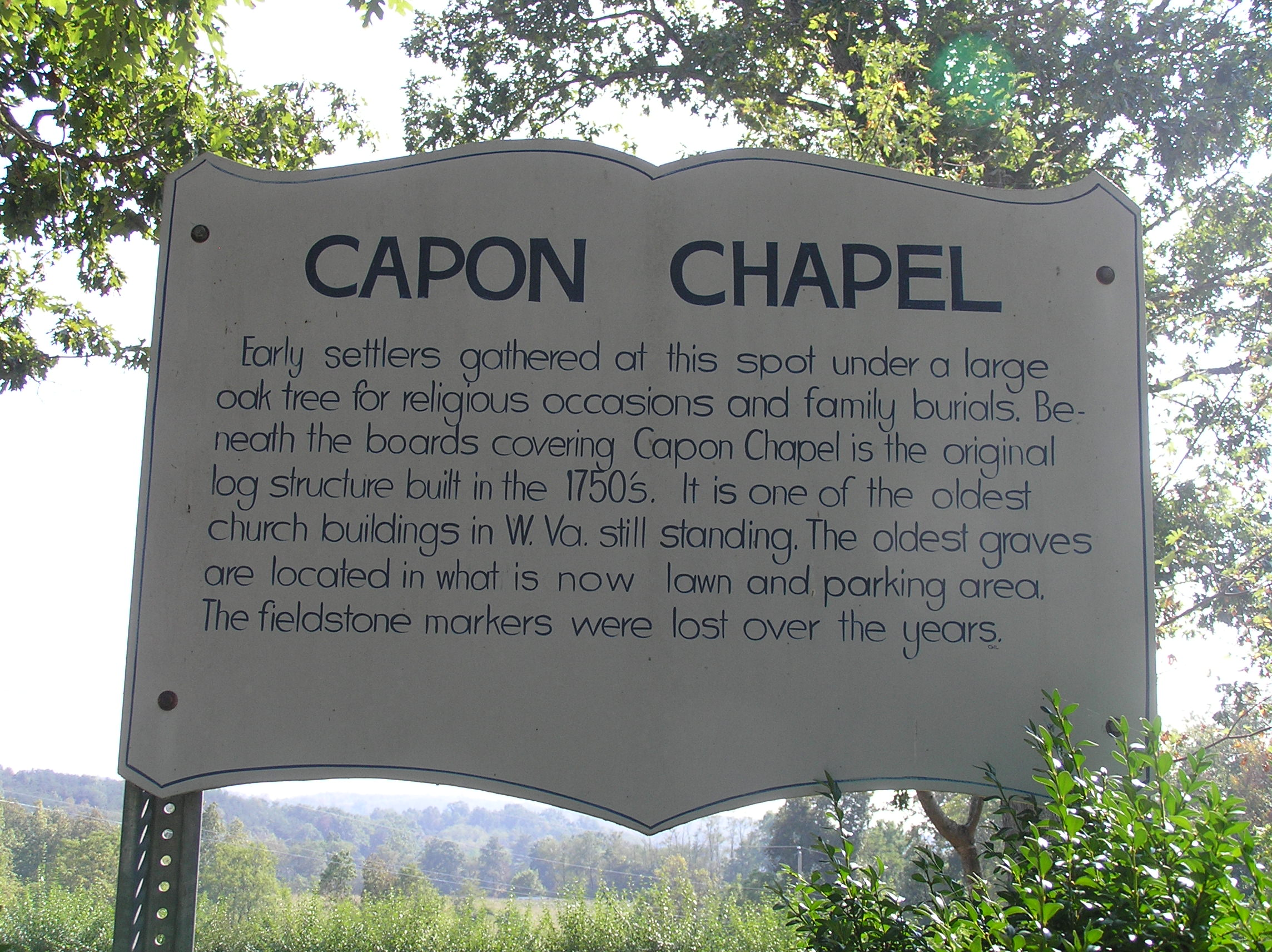
Capon Chapel marker

Title: Capon Chapel

Inscription: Early settlers gathered at this spot under a large oak tree for religious occasions and family burials. Beneath the boards covering Capon Chapel is the original log structure built in the 1750s. It is one of the oldest church buildings in W. Va. still standing. The oldest graves are located in what is now lawn and parking area. The fieldstone markers were lost over the years.

Location: Christian Church Road (County Route 13) near Capon Bridge

=== Whipple Truss ===
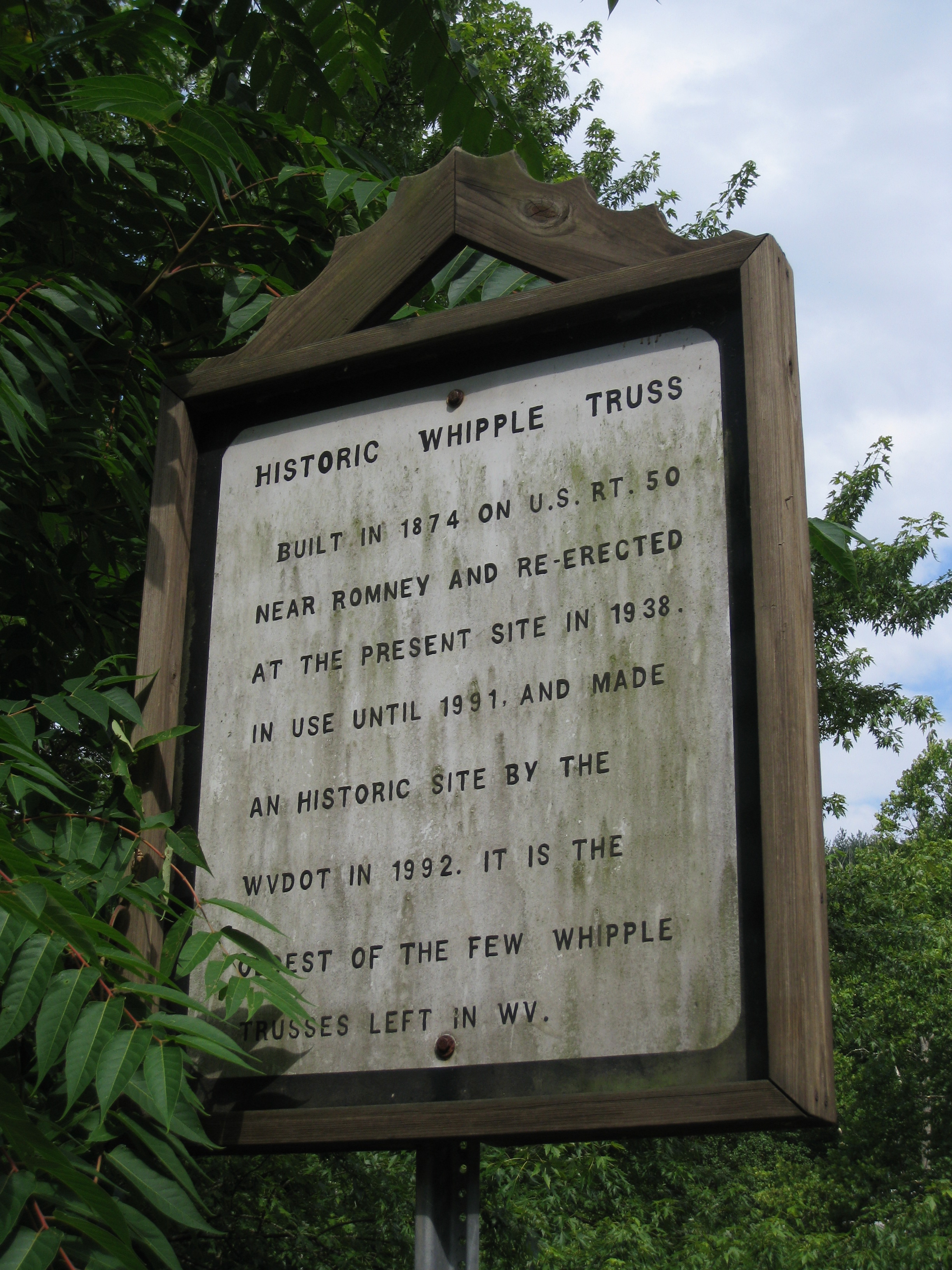
Whipple Truss marker

Title: Historic Whipple Truss

Inscription: Built in 1874 on U.S. Route 50 near Romney and re-erected at the present site in 1939. In use until 1991, and made an historic site by the WVDOT in 1992. It is the oldest of the few Whipple Trusses left in WV.

Location: West Virginia Route 259 in Capon Lake
