= Ice Mountain =

Mountain ridge and algific talus slope in Hampshire County, West Virginia, US

Ice Mountain Preserve
- IUCN category V (protected landscape/seascape)
- Location within West Virginia
- Location: Hampshire, West Virginia, United States
- Coordinates: 39°21′48″N 78°28′01″W
- Area: 149 acres (60 ha)
- Elevation: 1,509 ft (460 m)
- Website: Ice Mountain Preserve

Ice Mountain is a mountain ridge and algific talus slope that is part of a 149-acre (60 ha) preserve near the community of North River Mills in Hampshire County, West Virginia, United States. It was designated a National Natural Landmark in 2012.

Ice Mountain is protected by The Nature Conservancy and open for visits by small groups of hikers. It is nicknamed "Nature's Ice Box" and "Nature's Refrigerator" owing to its ice vents that release cool air all year long.

== Refrigeration ==
The accumulated rock detritus at Ice Mountain's base forms a talus that is 50 feet (15 m) thick in some places. It creates a refrigeration effect. As cold air sinks into the talus pile during the cooler months it forms masses of ice and ice vents inside it. The ice vents are in a section about 200 yards (180 m) in length along Ice Mountain's southern flank.

Cool air is expelled from the ice in the warmer months. Vent air temperatures vary throughout the year, but the mean annual temperature can be as low as 2 °C (35 °F). Within the area of ice vents there are approximately 60 different pockets and the cold air escapes through more than 150 small openings in the talus.

The cool air affects surrounding air and soil around creating an area of boreal species and plant growth. Studies of Ice Mountain's geology, geomorphology, and micro-climatology since 2000 have shown that ice is no longer apparent after early June, but it is unclear whether this disappearance is due to climate change or the abandonment of historic ice storage strategies.

== Flora ==
Ice Mountain's ice vents provide a habitat for boreal species of plants commonly found in Subarctic regions. The ecosystem exhibits a combination of Appalachian, Canadian, and Subarctic species in a humid subtropical climate. Northern boreal species have survived at Ice Mountain since the last glacial period and became isolated over time as temperatures warmed and relegated the boreal species to the Subarctic regions of North America. The cool air expulsed by the ice vents allowed boreal species to remain at Ice Mountain. Ice Mountain's boreal species are not only unique because of their isolated location, but also because of their elevation. Boreal species are typically found at elevations 4,000 feet (1,200 m) above mean sea level, but species at Ice Mountain survive at heights around 700 feet (210 m) above mean sea level.

Boreal species at Ice Mountain include bunchberry (Cornus canadensis), Appalachian wood fern (Gymnocarpium appalachianum), Canada mayflower (Maianthemum canadense), minniebush (Menziesia pilosa), mountain maple (Acer spicatum), nannyberry (Viburnum lentago), northern bedstraw (Galium boreale), prickly gooseberry (Ribes cynosbati), prickly rose (Rosa acicularis), purple virgin's bower (Clematis occidentalis), shale barren primrose (Oenothera argillicola), skunk currant (Ribes glandulosum), starflower (Trientalis borealis), and twinflower (Linnaea borealis). Eastern Hemlocks (Tsuga canadensis) provide shade to and cool the mountain's ice vents.

The Appalachian wood fern, which grows on moss, was once thought to have been extinct but is found in abundance near the cold vents at the base of Ice Mountain.

Parts of Ice Mountain are barren, but the majority of the ridge is covered in mountain laurel (Kalmia latifolia), sweet birch (Betula lenta), and Virginia pine (Pinus virginiana). Old growth species include chestnut oak (Quercus prinus), sweet birch (Betula lenta), and Eastern white pine (Pinus strobus). Ice Mountain's tree canopy also consists of sugar maple (Acer saccharum), American tulip poplar (Liriodendron tulipifera), shagbark hickory (Carya ovata), eastern black oak (Quercus velutina), black gum (Nyssa sylvatica), American sycamore (Platanus occidentalis), black cherry (Prunus serotina), linden (Tilia americana), white ash (Fraxinus americana), and black walnut (Juglans nigra).

West Virginia's state flower, the American rhododendron (Rhododendron maximum), grows in thick clusters along the lower mountainside of Ice Mountain.

== Fauna ==
Ice Mountain provides habitats for breeding neotropical birds including warblers, vireos, and thrushes as well as various types of birds common in the central Appalachian Mountains. Ice Mountain also serves as a habitat for bald eagles and ravens, which nest in the mountain's Raven Rocks outcrop named for them. Other bird species include American goldfinch (Carduelis tristis), great crested flycatcher (Myiarchus crinitus), indigo bunting (Passerina cyanea), red-tailed hawk (Buteo jamaicensis), and American black (Coragyps atratus) and turkey (Cathartes aura) vultures.

== Conservation ==
The Nature Conservancy, with the help of volunteers, has worked to control non-native invasive species to protect and preserve Ice Mountain's rare and native plant species. These invasive species include tree of heaven (Ailanthus altissima), garlic mustard (Alliaria petiolata), and Japanese stilt grass (Microstegium vimineum). The Nature Conservancy has also partnered with the United States Forest Service to prevent the deaths of eastern hemlocks (Tsuga canadensis) due to the hemlock woolly adelgid. The Nature Conservancy has worked with West Virginia University geologists to preserve and prevent the mountain's ice vents from succumbing to effects associated with climate change. The melting of the ice vents warms the soil's temperature which threatens the survival of the boreal species that thrive there. The Nature Conservancy also continues to monitor the natural forest regeneration in the areas of Ice Mountain affected by a 2008 tornado.

Guided hikes on Ice Mountain are offered on North River Mills and Ice Mountain Day in May and by appointment April through November.

== Geography and geology ==
Ice Mountain
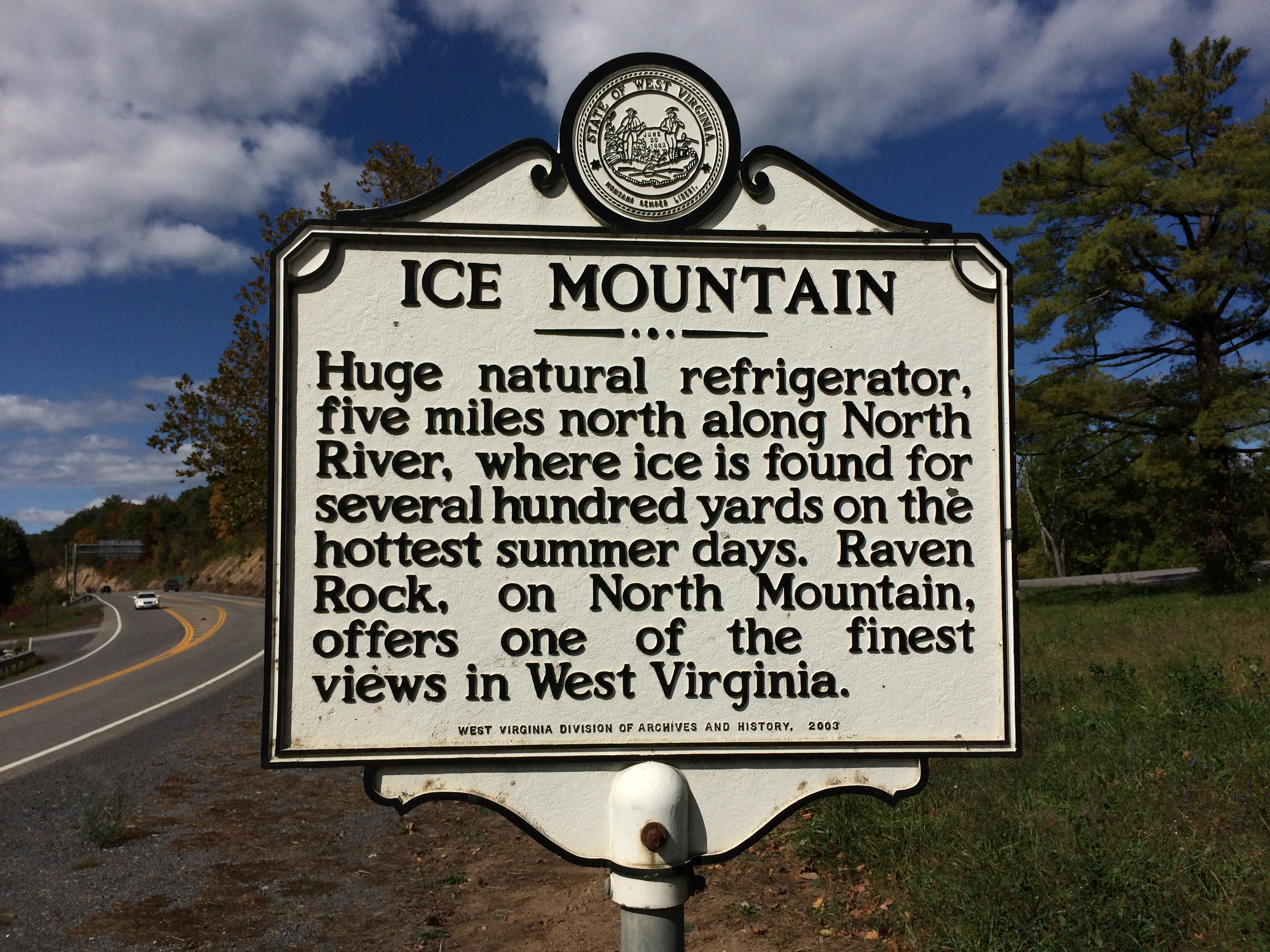

Highest point
- Elevation: 1,509 ft (460 m)
- Listing: Mountains of the Alleghenies
- Coordinates: 39°21′48″N 78°28′01″W

Geography
- Location: West Virginia, United States
- Parent range: North River Mountain, part of the Ridge-and-valley Appalachians
- Topo map: USGS Capon Bridge

Climbing
- First ascent: unknown
- Easiest route: Hike, Climb

Ice Mountain is an arc-shaped forested ridge of the Allegheny Mountains, part of the Ridge-and-valley Appalachians. It is 1,509 feet (460 m) above mean sea level at its summit. Ice Mountain is a large mass of Devonian Oriskany (Ridgeley) sandstone and Marcellus shale with numerous bare rock slopes and vertical cliffs. Ice Mountain lies on the west side of the Timber Mountain anticline and to the west of North Mountain fault, which places it on the Martinsburg allochthonous sheet. Ice Mountain is situated along North River and is known for the several hundred yards of ice that form at its base all year long. At its southern end overlooking the community of North River Mills is located Raven Rocks, a set of stone chimney outcrops. Raven Rocks is 1,230 feet (370 m) in height above mean sea level with vertical cliffs measuring nearly 200 feet (61 m) in height. Raven Rocks were named because of the presence of ravens during pioneer days. The present Raven Rocks is the remaining vestige of a once towering cliff that overlooked the North River. Geologically, Ice Mountain is a northern extension of North River Mountain.

== History ==
Ice Mountain has played a significant role in the history of the North River Mills community. Among Ice Mountain's earliest descriptions are mentions in Henry Howe's History of Virginia (1845) and in a Silliman's Journal article by Charles Hayden from the same year. Ice Mountain was also detailed in Hu Maxwell and Howard Llewellyn Swisher's History of Hampshire County, West Virginia: From Its Earliest Settlement to the Present (1897), O. F. Morton's History of Hampshire County (1910), and Homer Floyd Fansler's "Ice Mountain: Nature's Deep Freeze" in the July 1959 issue of West Virginia Conservation. The mountain was also featured in the April 1861 edition of Harper's New Monthly Magazine. The Harper's publishing company sent the article to the Winchester Star where it appeared in their October 10, 1962, issue.

Raven Rocks

Highest point
- Elevation: 1,230 ft (370 m)
- Coordinates: 39°20′15″N 78°29′48″W

Geography
- Location: West Virginia, United States
- Parent range: North River Mountain, part of the Ridge-and-valley Appalachians
- Topo map: USGS Capon Bridge

Climbing
- First ascent: unknown
- Easiest route: Hike, Climb

Ice Mountain earned its nicknames "Nature's Ice Box" and "Nature's Refrigerator" because of its use by Native Americans and early settlers for storage of perishable food items during the warmer months of the year. During the American Civil War, Ice Mountain was used as a lookout point while the surrounding area served as the scene of numerous small skirmishes. Thomas McMackin's Confederate militia company camped alongside North River at the base of Raven Rocks, where a sentinel was placed from daybreak to dusk. Around the late 19th and early 20th centuries, North River Mills residents would celebrate Independence Day and other occasions as late as September by digging up ice from the talus for the making of ice cream and lemonade.

The mountain had through generations been owned by the Deaver family, the last of which was Mrs. Virginia Pugh. On September 22, 1962 Hampshire County farmer Otis Baker purchased the 4-acre (1.6 ha) Ice Mountain and an adjacent 106 acres (43 ha) for $23,000 at a public auction at the Hampshire County Courthouse in Romney. Ice Mountain was purchased by The Nature Conservancy in 1991.

=== West Virginia state historical marker ===
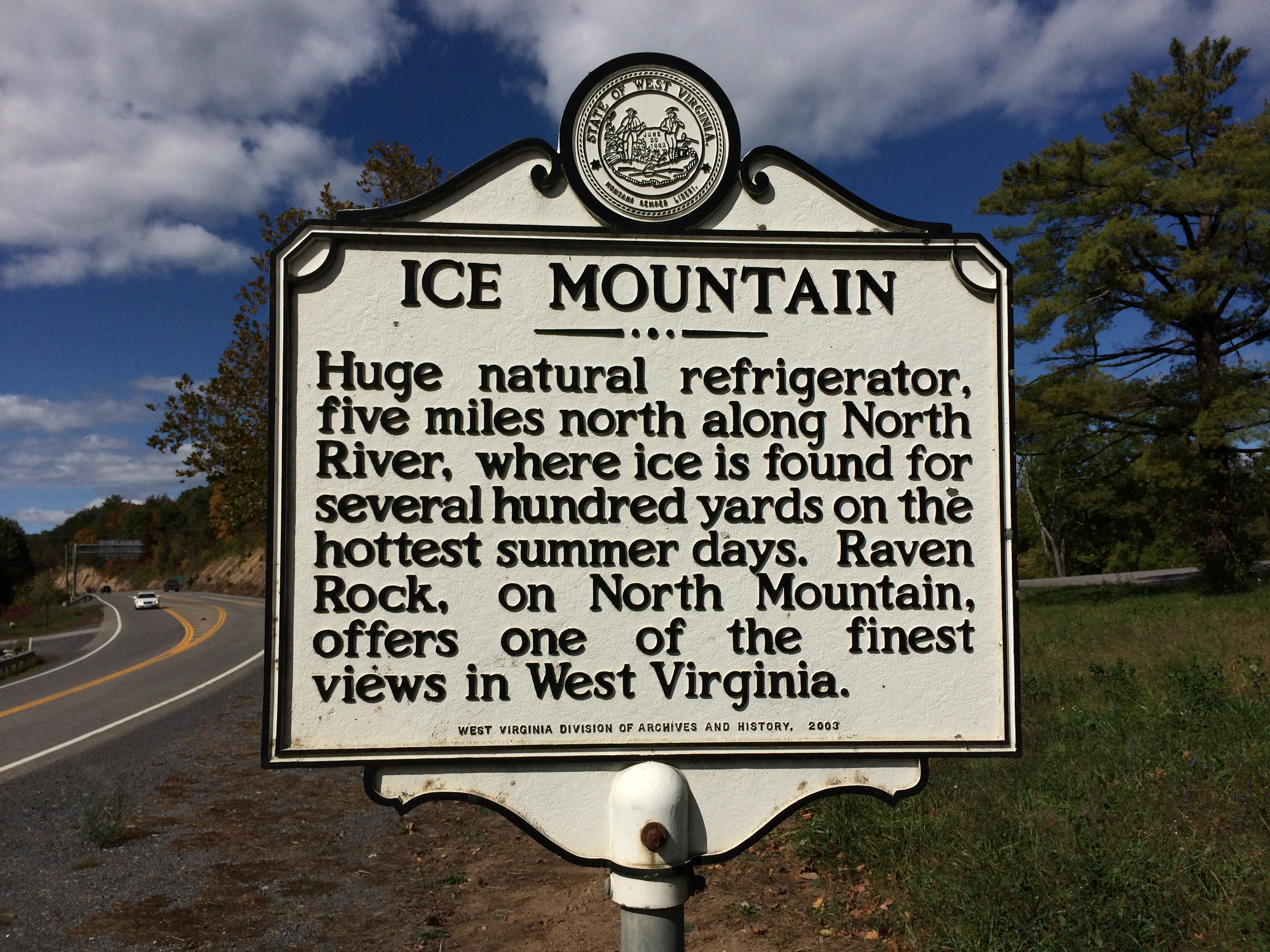
Ice Mountain historical marker

The text of the historical marker located at the U.S. Route 50/West Virginia Route 29 wye fork between Augusta and Pleasant Dale reads as follows:

Huge natural refrigerator, five miles north along North River, where ice is found for several hundred yards on the hottest summer days. Raven Rock, on North Mountain, offers one of the finest views in West Virginia.

== See also ==
- List of National Natural Landmarks in West Virginia
- North River (Cacapon River)
- North River Mountain
- Climate change in West Virginia
