= Wacousta Hill =

Mountain ridge in West Virginia, United States

Highest point
- Elevation: 1,276 ft (389 m)
- Coordinates: 39°13′00″N 78°36′14″W

Geography
- Location: Hampshire County, West Virginia, U.S.
- Parent range: Ridge-and-Valley Appalachians
- Topo map: USGS Yellow Spring

Climbing
- Easiest route: Hike, Drive

Wacousta Hill is a forested mountain ridge in southeast Hampshire County, West Virginia. Wacousta Hill is located near the community of Delray and overlooks Delray Road (West Virginia Route 29) and the North River to its immediate east. To its west lies the Short Mountain Wildlife Management Area. The Board on Geographic Names, through a board decision, gave the hill its official name in 1966.
