= Sedan, West Virginia =

- Unincorporated community
- Location within West Virginia Location within the United States
- Coordinates: 39°14′6″N 78°34′24″W
- Country: United States
- State: West Virginia
- County: Hampshire
- Time zone: UTC-5 (Eastern (EST))
  - Summer (DST): UTC-4 (EDT)
- GNIS feature ID: 1555587

Sedan is an unincorporated community in Hampshire County in the U.S. state of West Virginia. Sedan is located between Hanging Rock and Delray on Delray Road (West Virginia Route 29) in the North River Valley. The community was named for the Battle of Sedan, shortly after the battle was fought during the Franco-Prussian War on September 1, 1870. A post office operated in Sedan from 1871 to 1935.
