= Tearcoat Creek =

River in West Virginia, US

Coordinates: 39.29899°N 78.55223°W

Tearcoat Creek (officially Tear Coat Creek, per 1931 federal Board on Geographic Names decision) is an 18.3-mile-long (29.5 km) free-flowing tributary stream of the North River, itself a tributary of the Cacapon River, making it a part of the Potomac River and Chesapeake Bay watersheds. The creek is located in central Hampshire County, West Virginia. Its name is believed to have been derived from the tearing of the coats of British soldiers by low-hanging branches as they forded the stream during either the French and Indian or the American Revolutionary Wars.

Tearcoat Creek is popular with whitewater rafters who frequent the 3.9-mile (6.3 km) stretch of stream between the Northwestern Turnpike (U.S. Route 50) at Pleasant Dale and its mouth on the North River. The creek's Class II-III rapids are mostly on blind turns in the forested gorge near its mouth. Tearcoat Creek can be accessed by rafters from Tear Coat Road (CR 50/17), which is parallel to the stream from US 50.

== Headwaters & course ==
The stream's source lies near Ruckman where it flows northeast along the western flanks of Short Mountain (2,864 feet) parallel to Augusta-Ford Hill Road (CR 7). At Ford Hill (1,421 feet), Tearcoat Creek is joined by Mack Road (CR 7/5) and continues on its northeastern course. Through this stretch south of Augusta, Tearcoat merges with a number of smaller cattle watering streams increasing it in size. After parting from Mack Road, the creek meanders through a winding gorge to the west of Dunmore Ridge (1,401 feet). South of US 50, Tearcoat Creek is joined by its two largest named tributary streams: first Turkeyfoot Run and then Bearwallow Creek. Shortly after its confluence with Bearwallow Creek, it passes under the US 50 bridge at Pleasant Dale continuing northeast through another winding forested gorge. It is the stretch within this gorge that Tearcoat Creek, at times, is deep enough and contains enough water flow for Class II-III rapids. From the gorge, the creek turns east and converges with the North River north of Hanging Rock.

== See also ==
- List of West Virginia rivers
