= Hoy, West Virginia =

- Unincorporated community
- Location within West Virginia Location within the United States
- Coordinates: 39°19′4″N 78°34′47″W
- Country: United States
- State: West Virginia
- County: Hampshire
- Time zone: UTC-5 (Eastern (EST))
  - Summer (DST): UTC-4 (EDT)
- GNIS feature ID: 1549751

Hoy is an unincorporated community in Hampshire County in the U.S. state of West Virginia. It is located southwest of Slanesville and northwest of Hanging Rock at the intersection of Offutt School Road (West Virginia Secondary Route 45/8) and Hoy Road (West Virginia Secondary Route 45/13). A series of hills separates the community from the North River which lies to its east. Hoy once operated its own post office and elementary school before consolidation of both with Slanesville.

== Historic sites ==
- Hoy Grade School
- Zion Church of Christ
