= Bearwallow Creek =

River in West Virginia, United States

Coordinates: 39°18′41″N 78°37′29″W

Bearwallow Creek is a 4.3-mile-long (6.9 km) tributary stream of Tearcoat Creek, itself a tributary of the North River, making it a part of the Potomac River and Chesapeake Bay watersheds. Bearwallow Creek is located in Hampshire County, West Virginia. It rises on Chestnut Oak Ridge, from which it flows southwest along the ridge's eastern flanks and then begins its course southeast along Bear Wallow Hollow Road (County Route 50/14) and U.S. Route 50 until its confluence with Tearcoat Creek at Pleasant Dale.

== See also ==
- List of West Virginia rivers
