= Hampshire County Courthouse =

Hampshire County Courthouse or Old Hampshire County Courthouse may refer to the following buildings in the United States:

- Old Hampshire County Courthouse, Northampton, Hampshire County, Massachusetts
- Hampshire County Courthouse (West Virginia), in Romney
