= North River Mountain =

Mountain in the U.S. state of West Virginia

Highest point
- Elevation: 2,149 ft (655 m)
- Coordinates: 39°10′59″N 78°35′31″W

Geography
- Location: Hampshire County, West Virginia, U.S.
- Parent range: Ridge-and-Valley Appalachians
- Topo map(s): USGS Yellow Spring, Rio, Hanging Rock

Climbing
- Easiest route: Hike, Drive

North River Mountain is a mountain ridge that runs southwest to northeast in Hampshire County, West Virginia, United States. Named for the North River that parallels its western flanks for its entire length, North River Mountain reaches its highest elevation of 2,149 feet (655 m) near the community of Delray. North River Mountain extends from Staack's Gap at Rio to the Hiett Run gap at North River Mills. Geologically, Ice Mountain is the same mountain ridge, with the Hiett Run gap acting as the physical divide.
