= Kirby, West Virginia =

- Unincorporated community
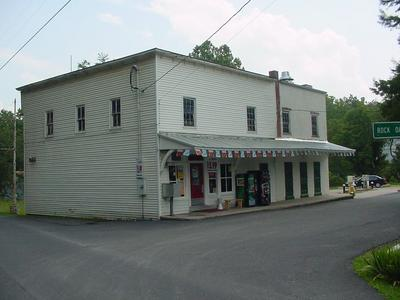
- Cox's Store in Kirby

- Location within West Virginia Location within the United States
- Coordinates: 39°10′58″N 78°43′34″W
- Country: United States
- State: West Virginia
- County: Hampshire
- Elevation: 1,519 ft (463 m)
- Time zone: UTC-5 (Eastern (EST))
  - Summer (DST): UTC-4 (EDT)
- ZIP code: 26755
- Area code: 304
- GNIS feature ID: 1554886

Kirby is an unincorporated community in Hampshire County in the U.S. state of West Virginia situated along Grassy Lick Run, a tributary of North River. Kirby is located south of Romney at the crossroads of Grassy Lick Road (West Virginia Secondary Route 10) and Rock Oak Road (West Virginia Secondary Route 10/6).

An early postmaster named Kirby gave the community his name.

== Historic site ==
- Cox's Store (c. 1864)
