= Delray, West Virginia =

Unincorporated community in West Virginia, United States

- Unincorporated community
- Location within West Virginia Location within the United States
- Coordinates: 39°11′40″N 78°36′15″W
- Country: United States
- State: West Virginia
- County: Hampshire
- Elevation: 997 ft (304 m)
- Time zone: UTC-5 (Eastern (EST))
  - Summer (DST): UTC-4 (EDT)
- ZIP code: 26714
- Area code: 304
- GNIS feature ID: 1554287

Delray is an unincorporated community in Hampshire County in the U.S. state of West Virginia. Delray is located in the North River Valley along Delray Road (West Virginia Route 29) between Sedan and Rio. According to the 2000 census, the Delray community has a population of 151.

Delray began a small agricultural community in the late eighteenth century. Its first storekeeper, John McDonald, owned and operated a stave mill and a barrel factory near his residence. The name Delray most likely is a name derived from Spanish meaning "of the king".

== Historic site ==
- Richards-Mowery House (c. 1850)

== See also ==
- Wacousta Hill
