= Grassy Lick Run =

River in West Virginia, United States

Coordinates: 39°08′55″N 78°43′07″W

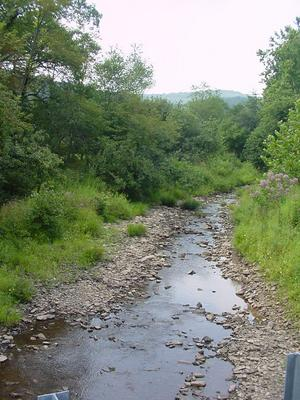
Grassy Lick Run in Kirby

Grassy Lick Run is a 7.1-mile-long (11.4 km) tributary stream of the North River, itself a tributary of the Cacapon River, making it a part of the Potomac River and Chesapeake Bay watersheds. Grassy Lick Run flows south through the community of Kirby.

== See also ==
- List of West Virginia rivers
