= Rio Turtle =

Turtle-shaped rock in the U.S. state of West Virginia

Coordinates: 39°08′38.1″N 78°42′26.5″W

- Rock
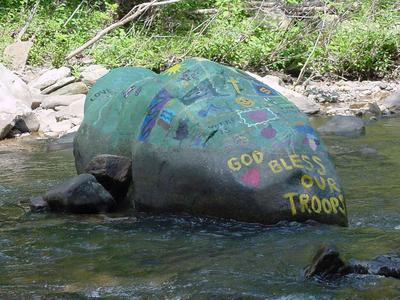
- The Rio Turtle's backside, August 2005
- Interactive map of Rio Turtle
- Location: North River near Rio, West Virginia

The Rio Turtle or Turtle Rock is a turtle-shaped rock located in the North River along Augusta-Ford Hill Road (West Virginia Secondary Route 53) approximately 2.5 miles (4.0 km) west of the community of Rio, West Virginia. While this stretch of the North River forms the border between Hampshire and Hardy Counties, the Rio Turtle is located on the Hampshire side.

Over the past few decades, the rock has been continually maintained and repainted by both local professional artists and graffiti artists and has become a popular tourist attraction and picnic rock in the North River Valley. After the September 11, 2001 attacks and the 2003 invasion of Iraq, the Rio Turtle's shell took a more patriotic and politically charged motif, including American flags, Christian crosses, and peace symbols. As of early Autumn 2006, the rock has been repainted and restored to its original tortoiseshell motif.

== Gallery ==
The Rio Turtle, early Autumn 2006

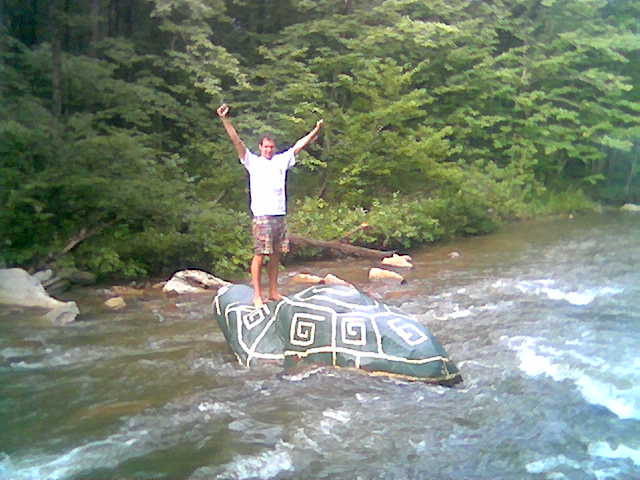
A Young Adventurer Conquering The Turtle, July 2008

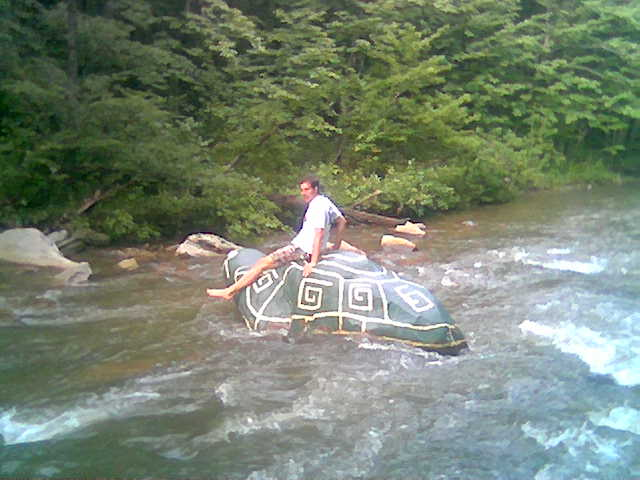
Save a Horse, Ride a Turtle, July 2008
