= Rock Oak, West Virginia =

- Unincorporated community
- Location within West Virginia Location within the United States
- Coordinates: 39°8′54″N 78°44′9″W
- Country: United States
- State: West Virginia
- County: Hardy
- Time zone: UTC-5 (Eastern (EST))
  - Summer (DST): UTC-4 (EDT)
- GNIS feature ID: 1555502

Rock Oak is an unincorporated community on North River in Hardy County, West Virginia, United States. The Board on Geographic Names officially decided upon the community's name in 1973.

The community was named for the rock oak trees near the original town site.
