= Inkerman, West Virginia =

- Unincorporated community
- Location within West Virginia Location within the United States
- Coordinates: 39°8′17″N 78°46′7″W
- Country: United States
- State: West Virginia
- County: Hardy
- Time zone: UTC-5 (Eastern (EST))
  - Summer (DST): UTC-4 (EDT)
- GNIS feature ID: 1554774

Inkerman is an unincorporated community in Hardy County, West Virginia, United States. Inkerman lies at the confluence of the North River and Skaggs Run.
