= Forks of Cacapon, West Virginia =

Unincorporated community in West Virginia, United States

- Unincorporated community
- Location of Forks of Cacapon in West Virginia Forks of Cacapon, West Virginia (the United States)
- Coordinates: 39°24′24″N 78°25′51″W
- Country: United States
- State: West Virginia
- County: Hampshire
- Elevation: 715 ft (218 m)
- Time zone: UTC-5 (Eastern (EST))
  - Summer (DST): UTC-4 (EDT)
- Area code: 304
- GNIS feature ID: 1539146

Forks of Cacapon (/kəˈkeɪpən/ kə-KAY-pən), formerly Forks of Capon (/ˈkeɪpən/ KAY-pən), is an unincorporated community in Hampshire County in the U.S. state of West Virginia. The community is named for its location at the confluence of the North River and Cacapon River. Forks of Cacapon is also located at another fork: the crossroads of West Virginia Route 29, West Virginia Route 127, and Frank Haines Road (West Virginia Secondary Route 45/5).

The community was originally known by the name of its post office, Forks of Capon. The post office was in operation from the mid-19th century until 1910. John Loy served as its final post master. Despite the name of its former post office, the community is now referred to as Forks of Cacapon.

== Historic sites ==
- Capon View Farm, Gaston Road (CR 45/7)
- Fort Capon site, Gaston Road (CR 45/7)
- Island Hill United Methodist Church, WV Route 29 North
- Old Forks of Capon Post Office & General Store, Gaston Road (CR 45/7)
