= Ruckman, West Virginia =

- Unincorporated community
- Location within West Virginia Location within the United States
- Coordinates: 39°13′58″N 78°41′34″W
- Country: United States
- State: West Virginia
- County: Hampshire
- Time zone: UTC-5 (Eastern (EST))
  - Summer (DST): UTC-4 (EDT)
- GNIS feature ID: 1556797

Ruckman is an unincorporated community farming community in Hampshire County in the U.S. state of West Virginia. Ruckman is located at the intersections of Ash Ruckman Road (WV Secondary Route 7/4) with J.C. Ruckman (WV Secondary Route 12/6) and Edgar Loy (WV Secondary Route 7/7) Roads south of Augusta and northeast of Kirby. It is named for the Ruckman family that is still prevalent in the area. Ruckman's post office is no longer in operation.
