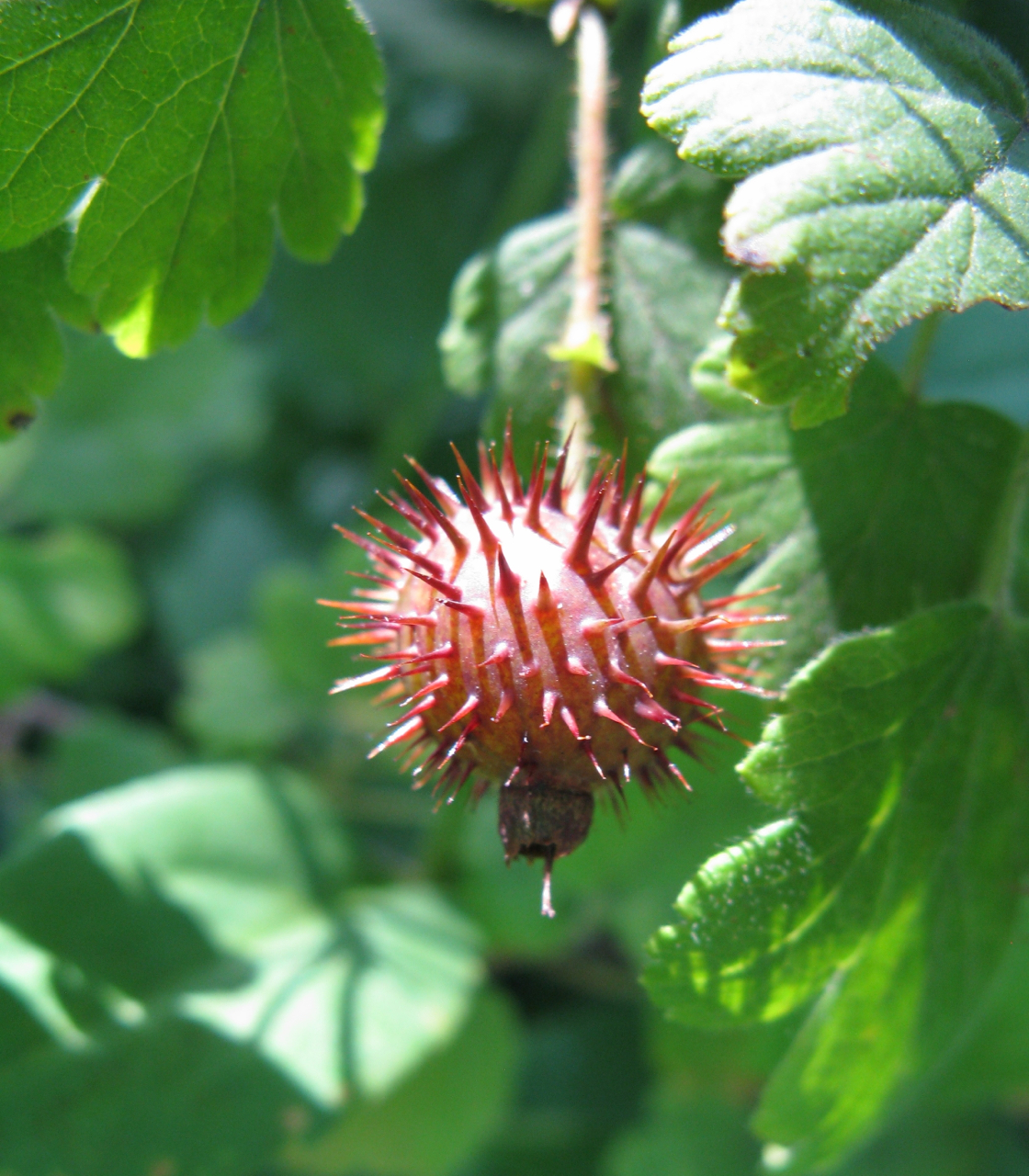

Scientific classification
- Kingdom: Plantae
- Clade: Tracheophytes
- Clade: Angiosperms
- Clade: Eudicots
- Order: Saxifragales
- Family: Grossulariaceae
- Genus: Ribes
- Species: R. cynosbati

Binomial name
- Ribes cynosbati L.

Synonyms
- Grossularia cynosbati (L.) Mill.; Ribes cynosbati var. atrox Fernald; Ribes cynosbati f. atrox (Fernald) B. Boivin; Ribes huronense Rydb.

= Ribes cynosbati =

Species of shrub

Ribes cynosbati is a North American species of shrub in the family Grossulariaceae (gooseberries and currants). It is native to the eastern and central United States and Canada. It has several common names, including prickly gooseberry, eastern prickly gooseberry, dogberry, and dog bramble. It grows in rich forests, rocky slopes, and open heaths from New Brunswick south along the Appalachian Mountains to northern Alabama and west as far as Manitoba, the Dakotas and Oklahoma.

== Description ==
Ribes cynosbati reaches a height of up to 1.5 m (4 ft 11 in) with erect to spreading stems. The leaves have 3 or 5 lobes, with glandular hairs. The flowers are greenish-white. The round fruits are bristly, white to greenish, and pleasant-tasting.

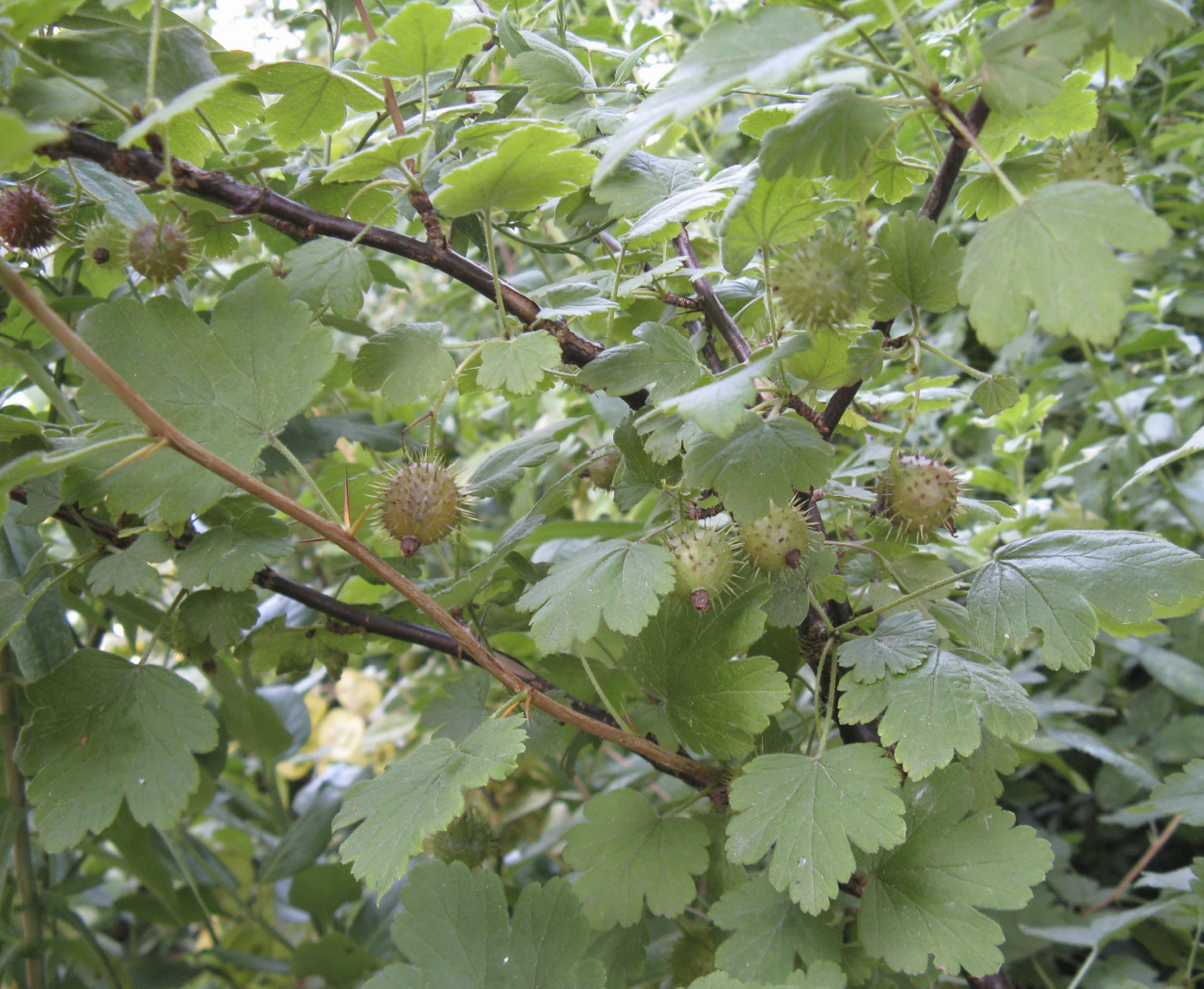
Fruits and leaves

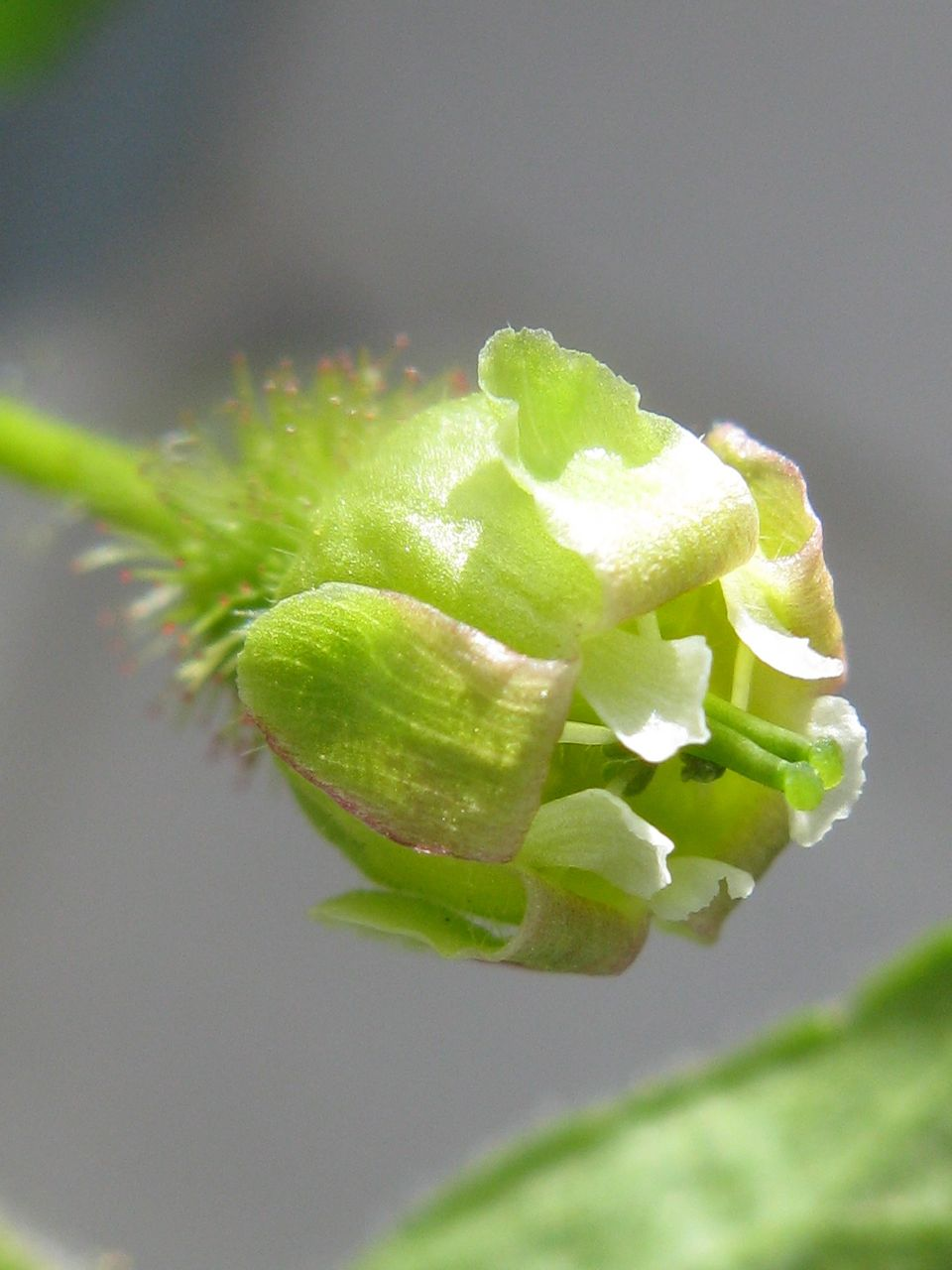
Flowers

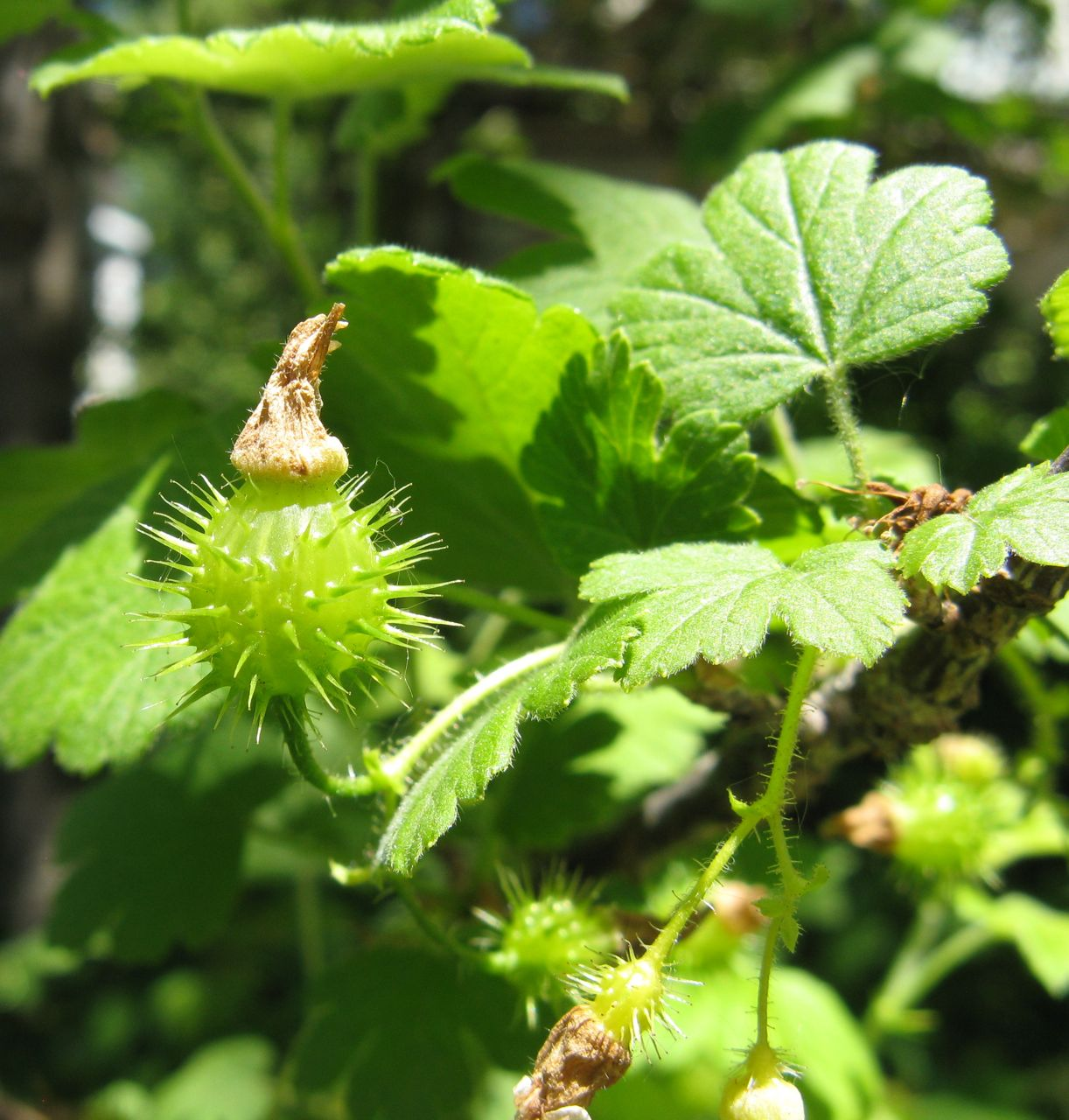
young fruit
