= Rio, West Virginia =

- Unincorporated community
- Location within West Virginia Location within the United States
- Coordinates: 39°8′18″N 78°40′12″W
- Country: United States
- State: West Virginia
- County: Hampshire
- Time zone: UTC-5 (Eastern (EST))
  - Summer (DST): UTC-4 (EDT)
- GNIS feature ID: 1545756

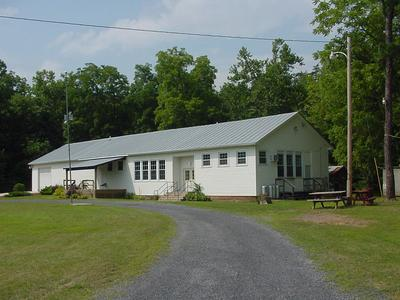
Old Rio Schoolhouse.

Rio (pronounced RYE-O) is an unincorporated community in southern Hampshire County in the U.S. state of West Virginia. Rio is located just north of the Hardy County line at the crossroads of Augusta-Ford Hill Road (West Virginia Secondary Route 53) and Delray Road (West Virginia Route 29) in the North River Valley. According to the 2000 census, the Rio community has a population of 154.

The community most likely was named for the nearby North River, rio meaning "river" in Spanish.

According to the official Hampshire County history book, Rio was originally going to be named Oxford, but a hamlet in Doddridge County already carried the name. residents were then going to name the village Richardson, but that name didn't stick either. Ultimately, they decided to name the town after an indigenous landmark to the valley, so they named the town Rio, the Spanish word for river, after North River that runs through the center of town. The Spanish word is pronounced "Ree-Oh," but in the town of Rio, locals and others culturally pronounce the town name as "Rye-Oh." (Hampshire County, West Virginia, 1754–2004, published by the Hampshire County 250th Anniversary Committee)

Sitting in North River around Rio is a well-known landmark—The Rio Turtle (also sometimes called Turtle Rock). The rock formation is shaped like a turtle and various residents, over decades, have painted the Rio Turtle to resemble its name, often with a traditional green shell. The Rio Turtle is among the town's most famous natural landmarks.

== Historic sites and attractions ==
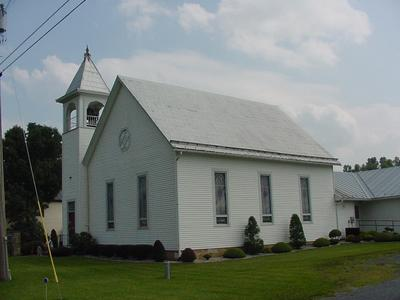
Ebenezer Lutheran Church.

- Rio Turtle, 2.5 mi. West of Rio on Augusta-Ford Hill Road (CR 53)
- Old Rio Schoolhouse, In Rio on Delray Road (WV Route 29)
- Ebenezer Lutheran Church, In Rio on Augusta-Ford Hill Road (CR 53)
- God's Pavilion Church, In Rio in Augusta-Ford Hill Road (CR 53)
- Rio Fun Fair and Parade @ the Old Schoolhouse, 4 July Weekend
