= Hanging Rock, West Virginia =

- Unincorporated community
- Location within West Virginia Location within the United States
- Coordinates: 39°15′57″N 78°32′27″W
- Country: United States
- State: West Virginia
- County: Hampshire
- Time zone: UTC-5 (Eastern (EST))
  - Summer (DST): UTC-4 (EDT)
- GNIS feature ID: 1539908

Hanging Rock is an unincorporated community in Hampshire County in the U.S. state of West Virginia. Hanging Rock is named for the "Hanging Rock" outcrop that hangs over the Northwestern Turnpike (U.S. Route 50). It should not be confused with the plural "Hanging Rocks" over the South Branch Potomac River north of Romney at Wapocomo. Originally, the community of Hanging Rock sprang up in the Henderson Hollow gap of North River Mountain. While only a few buildings of the old hamlet remain, today's Hanging Rock is situated at the intersection of North River Road (County Route 50/21) and Delray Road (West Virginia Route 29) where the North River flows under U.S. Route 50 towards the Cacapon.

On April 16, 1756, Daniel Morgan was wounded during a Native American attack near Hanging Rock while on the road to Winchester. The attack also resulted in the death of his two companions. Morgan managed to remain in his saddle and escaped with neck and mouth wounds towards Fort Edwards on the Cacapon River near Capon Bridge.

The rock formation's vicinity was also the scene of skirmishes between Union and Confederate troops in 1861. This American Civil War engagement is often referred to as "The Battle of Hanging Rocks" or the "Battle of Hanging Rocks Pass."
