= West Virginia Route 29 =

State highway in West Virginia, United States

West Virginia Route 29

Route information
- Maintained by WVDOH
- Length: 69.3 mi (111.5 km)

Major junctions
- South end: US 48 / WV 55 / WV 259 in Baker
- US 50 near Pleasant Dale; WV 127 at Forks of Cacapon
- North end: WV 9 near Paw Paw

Location
- Country: United States
- State: West Virginia
- Counties: Hardy, Hampshire

Highway system
- West Virginia State Highway System; Interstate; US; State
← WV 28	→ US 30

West Virginia Route 29 is a north–south state highway located in the Eastern Panhandle of West Virginia. The southern terminus of the route is at West Virginia Route 55 and West Virginia Route 259 (Corridor H) in Baker, Hardy County. The northern terminus is at West Virginia Route 9 three miles (5 km) south of Paw Paw in Hampshire County.

== Route description ==
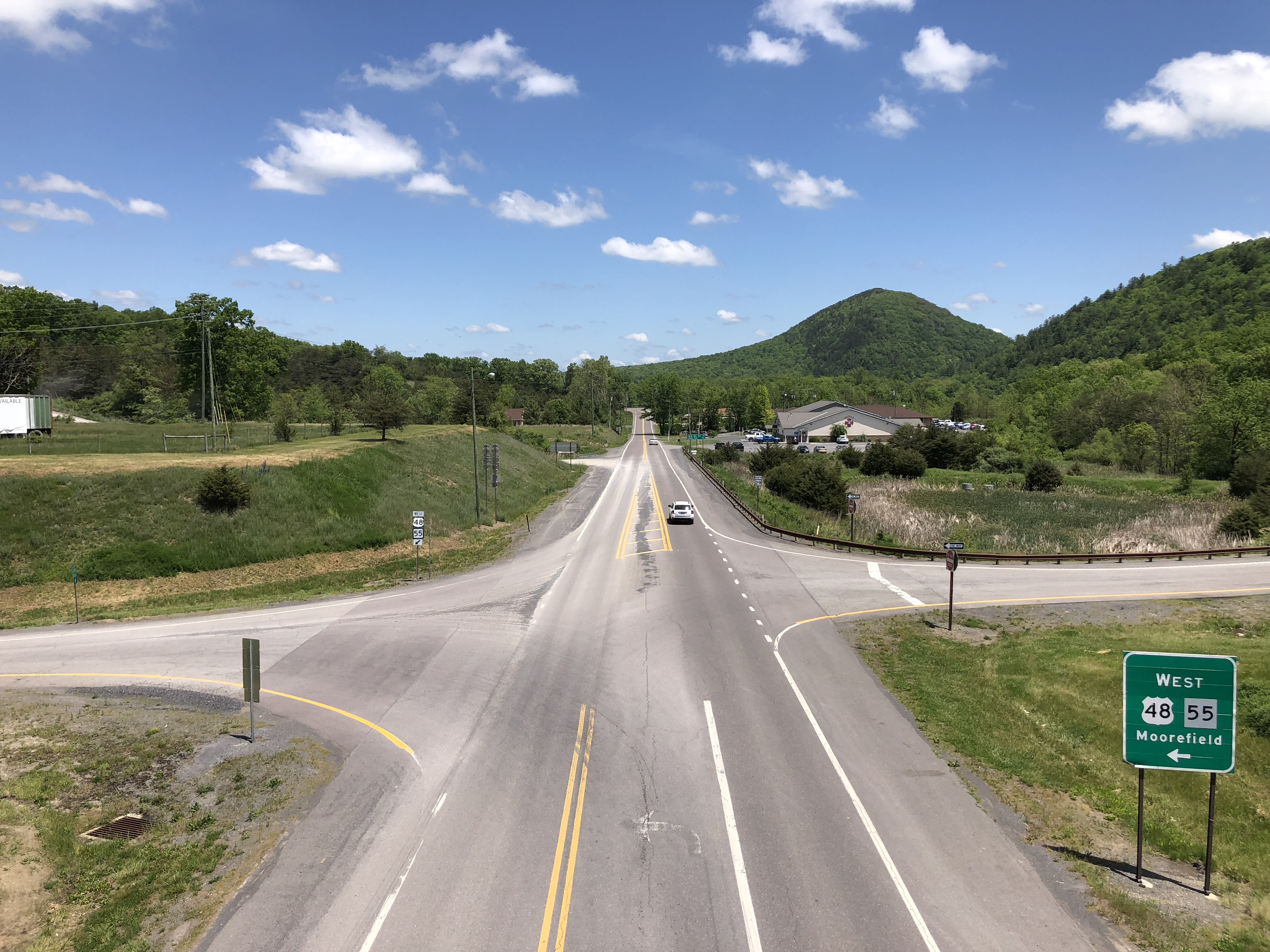
View north along WV 29 at US 48/WV 55/WV 259 in Baker

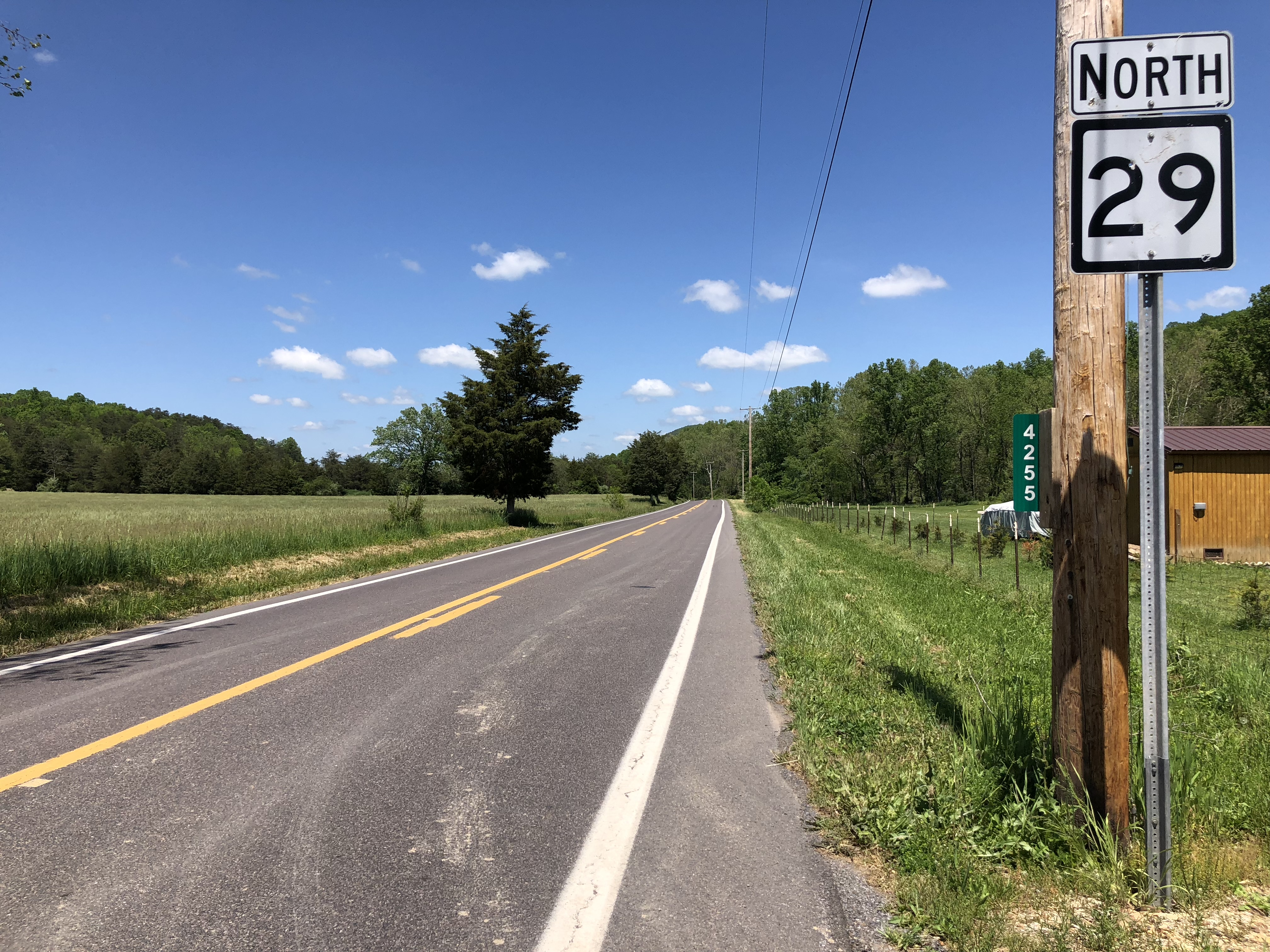
View north along WV 29 near Sedan

From Rio to Hanging Rock, WV 29 is named Delray Road for the community of Delray. This stretch was formerly known as North River Road (County Route 11) for the river it parallels. From Hanging Rock to the Augusta WV 29 wye fork, WV 29 runs concurrent with U.S. Route 50 and is referred to as the Northwestern Turnpike. From the Augusta WV 29 wye fork to the Forks of Cacapon West Virginia Route 127 wye fork, WV 29 is named the Bloomery Pike for Bloomery on WV 127. This route was known as the Martinsburg Grade.

== Attractions ==
- Rio Mall, Rio
- Richards-Mowery House, Delray
- Pin Oak Fountain, Pin Oak

== Major intersections ==
County	Location	mi	km	Destinations	Notes
Hardy	Baker			US 48 / WV 55 / WV 259 – Wardensville, Mathias, Moorefield	interchange
Hampshire				US 50 east – Winchester, VA	south end of US 50 overlap
Hampshire				US 50 west – Romney	north end of US 50 overlap
Hampshire				WV 127 east to US 522	
Hampshire				WV 9 – Paw Paw, Berkeley Springs	
1.000 mi = 1.609 km; 1.000 km = 0.621 mi: Concurrency terminus
