= Pleasant Dale, West Virginia =

- Unincorporated community
- Location within West Virginia Location within the United States
- Coordinates: 39°17′39″N 78°35′10″W
- Country: United States
- State: West Virginia
- County: Hampshire
- Time zone: UTC-5 (Eastern (EST))
  - Summer (DST): UTC-4 (EDT)
- GNIS feature ID: 1555374

Pleasant Dale or Pleasantdale is an unincorporated community in Hampshire County in the U.S. state of West Virginia. It is located between Capon Bridge and Augusta on the Northwestern Turnpike (U.S. Route 50). Tearcoat Creek flows through Pleasant Dale and offers whitewater rafting in the Spring from the U.S. Route 50 bridge to its confluence with the North River.

The community was named for a scenic dale near the town site.
