= North River (Cacapon River tributary) =

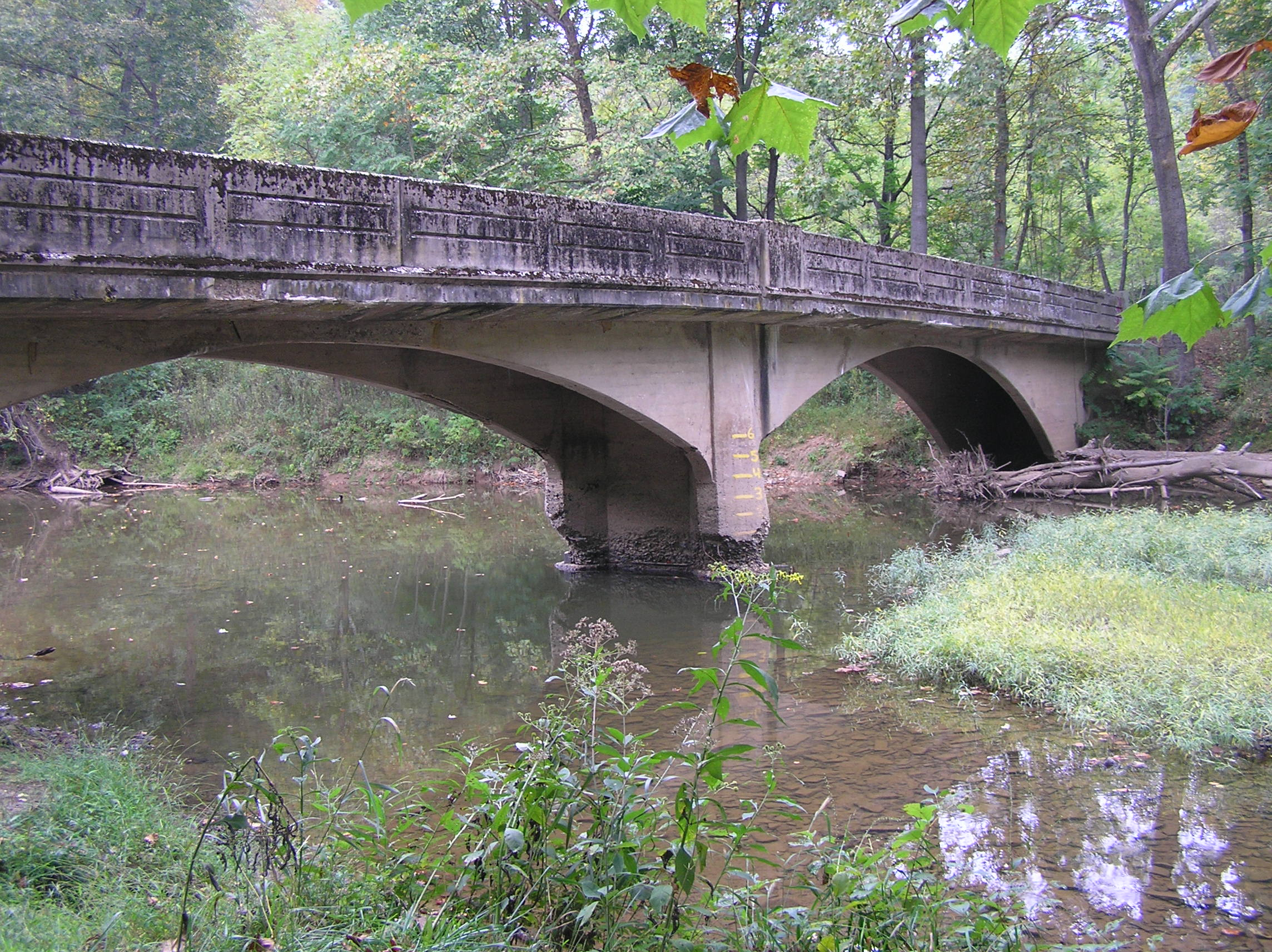
- Bridge over the North River near North River Mills

Location
- Country: United States

Physical characteristics
- Source
  - location: South Branch Mountain, Hardy County, West Virginia
- Mouth
  - location: Cacapon River at Forks of Cacapon, Hampshire County, West Virginia; 39°24′33″N 78°25′16″W
- Length: 52 mi (84 km)
- Basin size: 206 mi^{2} (530 km^{2})

The North River is a tributary of the Cacapon River, belonging to the Potomac River and Chesapeake Bay watersheds. The river is located in Hampshire and Hardy counties in the U.S. state of West Virginia's Eastern Panhandle. The mouth of the North River into the Cacapon is located at Forks of Cacapon. From its headwaters to its mouth, the North River spans 52.4 miles (84.3 km) in length.

== Headwaters and course ==
=== South Branch Mountain to Rio ===
The North River's headwaters comprise two streams that converge in the southeastern hollows of South Branch Mountain (3028 ft) in Hardy County. From its source, the river flows east through the communities of Inkerman and Rock Oak along North River Road (County Route 1) where it is joined by Grassy Lick Run. The North River continues to flow east as a shallow stony stream and after it passes through a gap in Short Mountain (2864 ft), it acts as the border between Hardy and Hampshire counties. It is in this stretch that the river is home to the Rio Turtle, a large turtle-shaped rock painted to resemble a turtle. The river then enters exclusively into Hampshire County where it meets the community of Rio and Sperry Run, which flows in from the south.

=== Rio to Forks of Cacapon ===
At Rio (pronounced RYE-O), the North River makes a ninety-degree bend and flows north into the wide fertile North River Valley along North River Mountain (2149 ft). Also beginning at Rio, the North River parallels West Virginia Route 29 (Delray Road). On its journey northward, the river is fed from the west by Deep Run and Mick Run, which drain off of Short Mountain. Further north along WV 29, the river passes through the communities of Delray and Sedan at Pearl Ridge (1302 ft). Departing from Sedan, the North River flows under the Northwestern Turnpike (U.S. Route 50) at Hanging Rock and winds its way northward around North River Mountain. Pine Draft Run and Tearcoat Creek join the river south of Hoy before the river bends yet again and joins Gibbons Run. Flowing through the historic village of North River Mills, the river is joined by Hiett's Run, which flows from the eastern side of Ice Mountain (1489 ft). After North River Mills, the river makes a sharp linear curve around the Devil's Backbone (856 ft) and then commences its movement northward along Pine Mountain (1726 ft). The North River crosses under the Bloomery Pike (West Virginia Route 127) and is then joined from the west by Crooked Run before flowing under Gaston Road's one-lane bridge and finally arriving at its confluence with the Cacapon River at Forks of Cacapon.

== History ==
Since the early settlement of Hampshire County, the North River had been considered unnavigable by locals and experts alike.

== Gallery ==
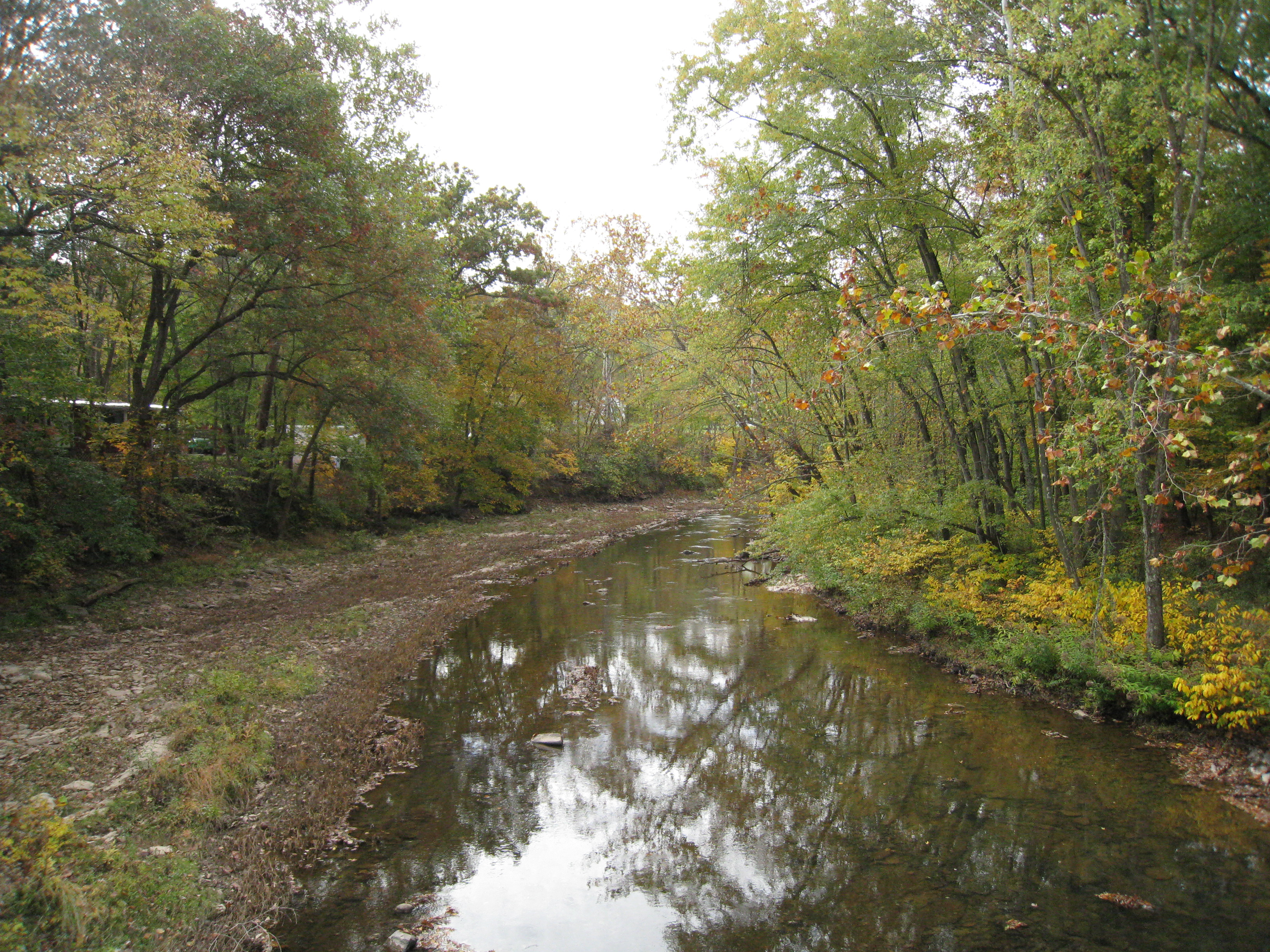
North River at Gaston Road (County Route 45/7) near Forks of Cacapon

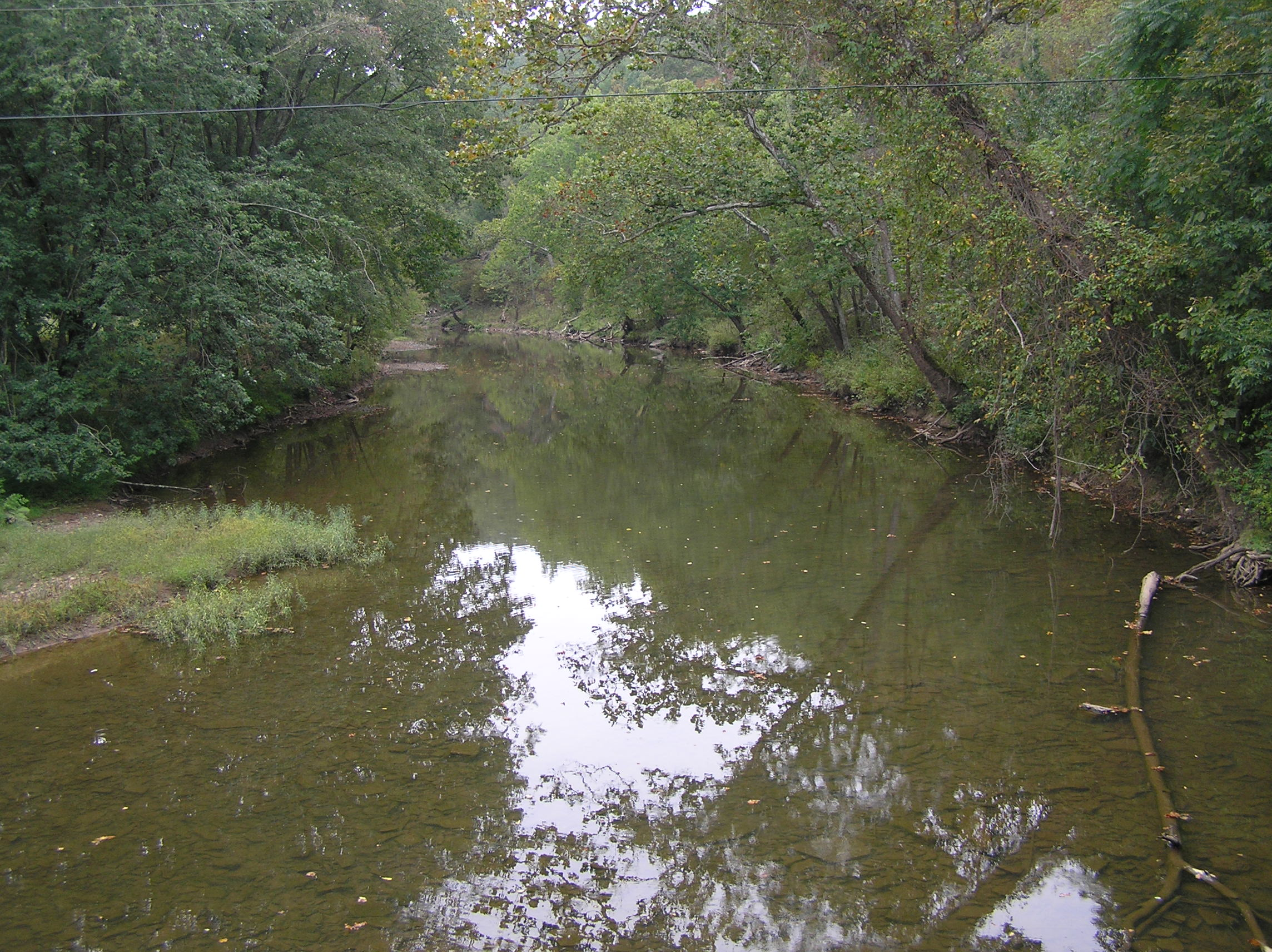
North River viewed from Cold Stream Road (County Route 45/20) bridge at North River Mills

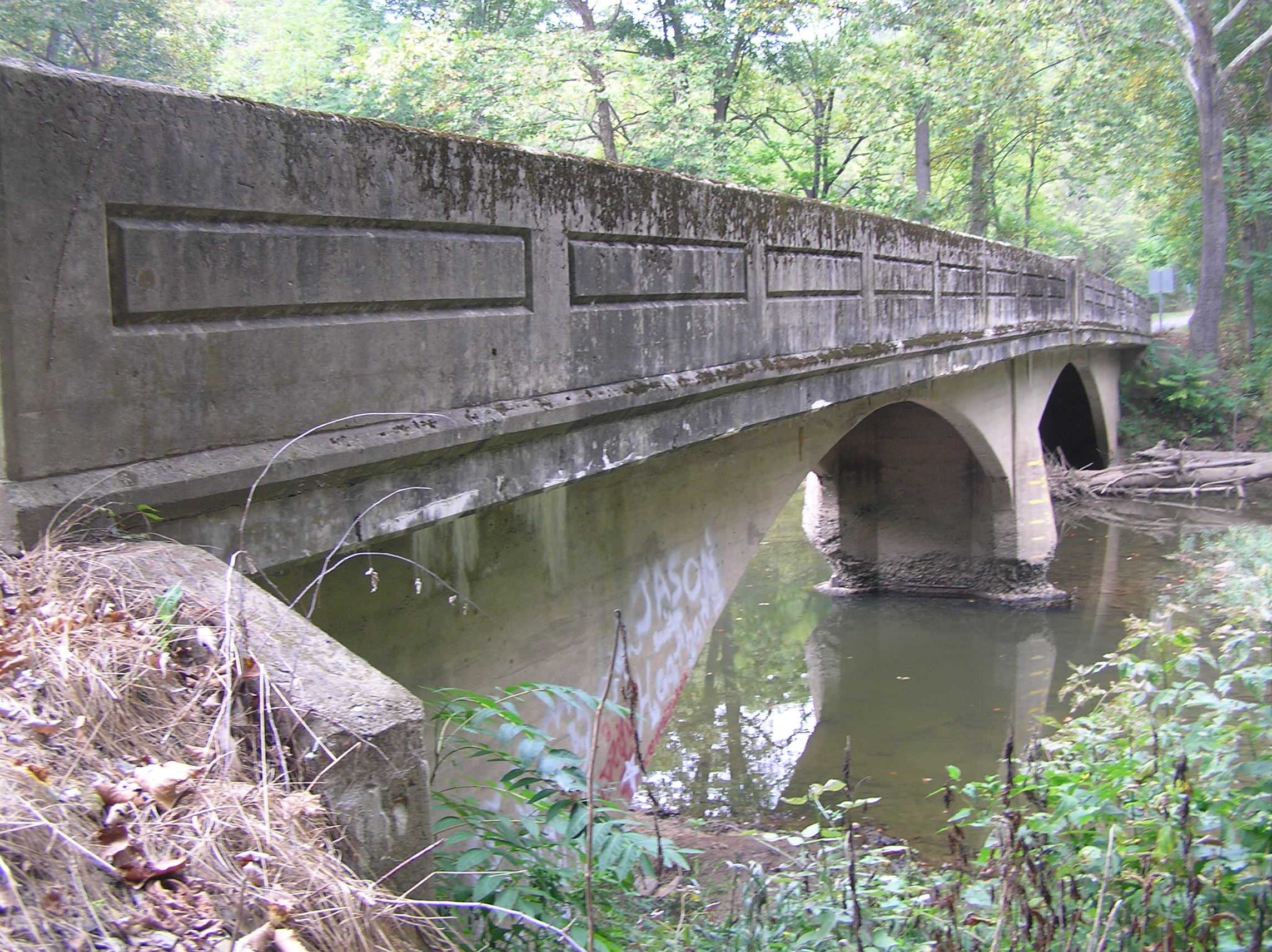
North River viewed from Cold Stream Road (County Route 45/20) bridge at North River Mills

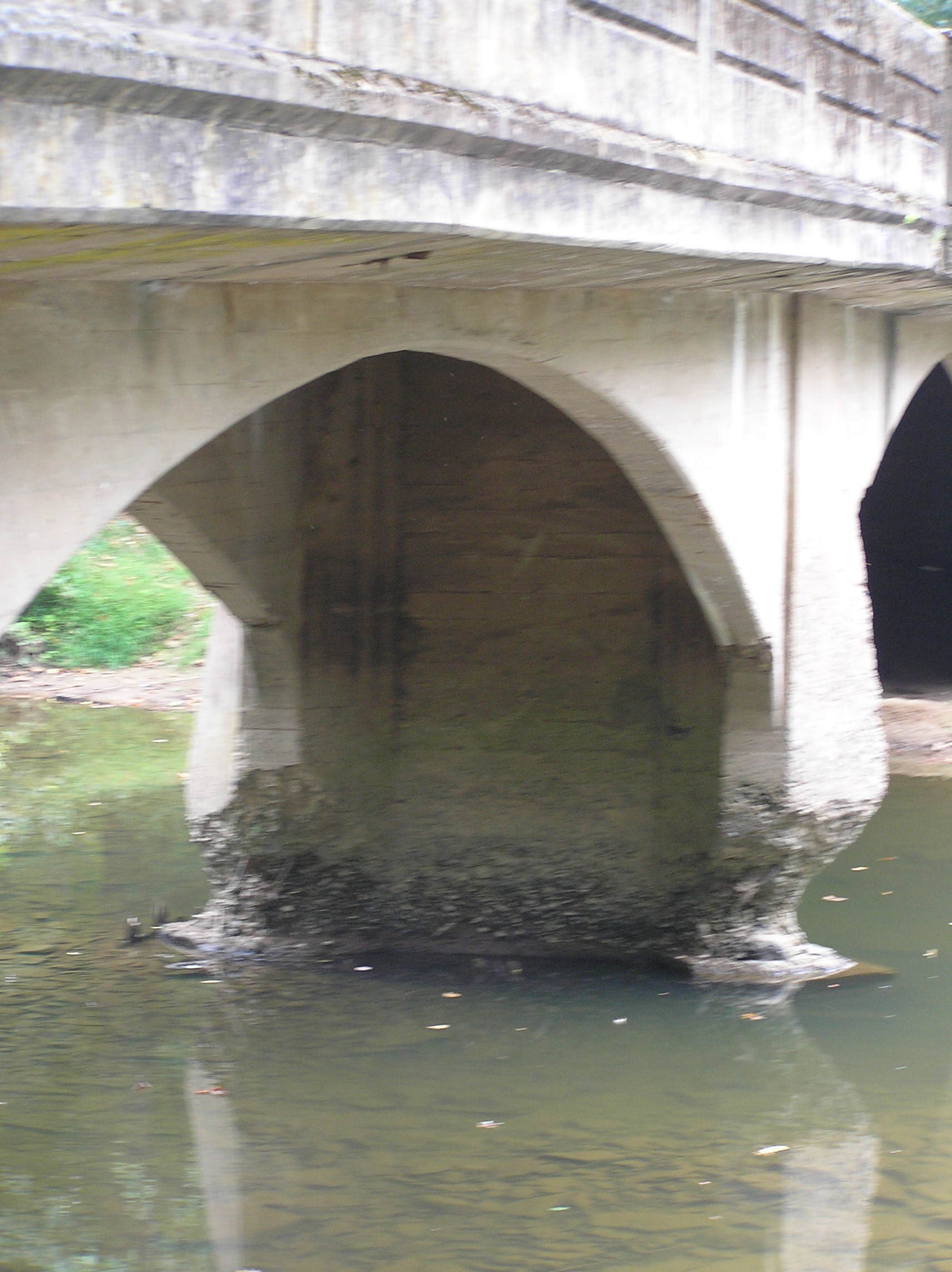
North River viewed from Cold Stream Road (County Route 45/20) bridge at North River Mills

== Bridges ==
Bridge	Route	Location
Bridge at Skagg's Run	CR 1/5	Inkerman
Bridge	North River Road (CR 1)	Inkerman
Bridge	North River Road (CR 1)	Rock Oak
Rock Oak Bridge	Rock Oak Road	Rock Oak
Bridge at Waterlick Run	CR 1/1	Rock Oak
North River Bridge	Augusta-Ford Hill Road (CR 53)	Rio
Upper Mullins Road Bridge	Mullins Road (off CR 53)	Rio
Lower Mullins Road Bridge	Mullins Road (off CR 53)	Rio
Rio WV 29 Bridge	Delray Road (WV 29)	Rio
Sedan WV 29 Bridge	Delray Road (WV 29)	Sedan
Sedan School Road Bridge	Sedan School Road (CR 11/1)	Sedan
Hanging Rock Bridge	Northwestern Turnpike (US 50/WV 29)	Hanging Rock
One-Lane Double Arch Bridge	Cold Stream Road (CR 45/20)	North River Mills
North River WV 127 Bridge	Bloomery Pike (WV 127)	Forks of Cacapon
One-Lane Arch Bridge	Gaston Road (CR 45/7)	Forks of Cacapon

== Tributaries ==
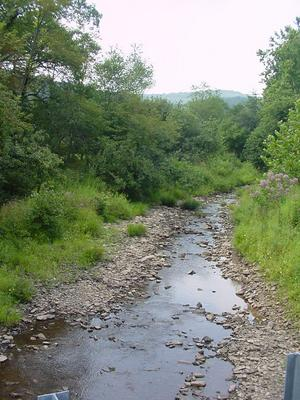
Grassy Lick Run in Kirby

Tributary streams are listed in order from south (source) to north (mouth).

- Skaggs Run
- Pot Lick Run
  - Horn Camp Run
- Waterlick Run
- Grassy Lick Run
- Meadow Run
- Sperry Run
- Deep Run
- Lick Run
- Elkhorn Run
- Hanging Rock Run
  - Stuart Hollow Run
  - Henderson Hollow Run
- Pine Draft Run
- Tearcoat Creek
  - Turkeyfoot Run
  - Bearwallow Creek
- Gibbons Run
- Maple Run
- Hiett Run
  - Riggs Hollow Run
- Crooked Run
- Castle Run

== List of cities and towns along the North River ==
- Delray
- Forks of Cacapon
- Hanging Rock
- Hoy
- Inkerman
- North River Mills
- Rio
- Rock Oak
- Sedan

== See also ==
- List of rivers of West Virginia
