= Corridor D =

Highway in the United States

Corridor D

Major junctions
- West end: I-275 near Cincinnati, OH
- US 23/Corr. C near Piketon, OH; I-77 near Parkersburg, WV
- East end: I-79 near Clarksburg, WV

Location
- Country: United States

Highway system
- United States Numbered Highway System; List; Special; Divided
- West Virginia State Highway System; Interstate; US; State
- Ohio State Highway System; Interstate; US; State; Scenic

In the United States, Corridor D is part of the Appalachian Development Highway System. In Ohio, it follows State Route 32 from the eastern Cincinnati suburbs until a point west of Albany, where it becomes concurrent with U.S. Route 50. After crossing into West Virginia, it follows U.S. Route 50 until the Interstate 79 interchange in Clarksburg.

The West Virginia portion was constructed during 1967–1977, and the Ohio portion during 2000–2008. ADHS Funding is separate from other Federal Highway funds.

== Route description ==
=== Ohio ===
Corridor D begins at the western edge of the Appalachian Regional Commission area at the Hamilton County–Clermont County border east of Cincinnati. It intersects Interstate 275, Cincinnati's beltway, and then U.S. Route 68 and U.S. Route 62 as it crosses the Ohio glacial till plain.

Corridor D enters the Allegheny Plateau east of Peebles, crossing the Portage Escarpment near the summit of Tener Mountain before descending into the Scioto River valley and intersecting U.S. Route 23 (Corridor C). After about 25 miles (40 km) it passes through Jackson, where it is intersected by U.S. Route 35. After another 20 miles (32 km) it converges with U.S. Route 50; the two routes are concurrent for the remainder of the segment through Ohio.

It reaches Athens after traveling northeastward for about 12 miles (19 km). It then travels southeast for about 15 miles (24 km) roughly paralleling the Hocking River, and then 15 miles (24 km) northeast as it approaches the Ohio River. The highway crosses the Ohio River on the Blennerhassett Island Bridge just west of Belpre.

=== West Virginia ===
Corridor D crosses the Little Kanawha River and interchanges with Interstate 77 near Parkersburg shortly after entering West Virginia. It continues to ascend the Allegheny Plateau through rugged terrain. In Clarksburg, it crosses the West Fork River and ends at the Interstate 79 interchange, with U.S. Route 50 continuing eastward as a two-lane mountain road.

== History ==
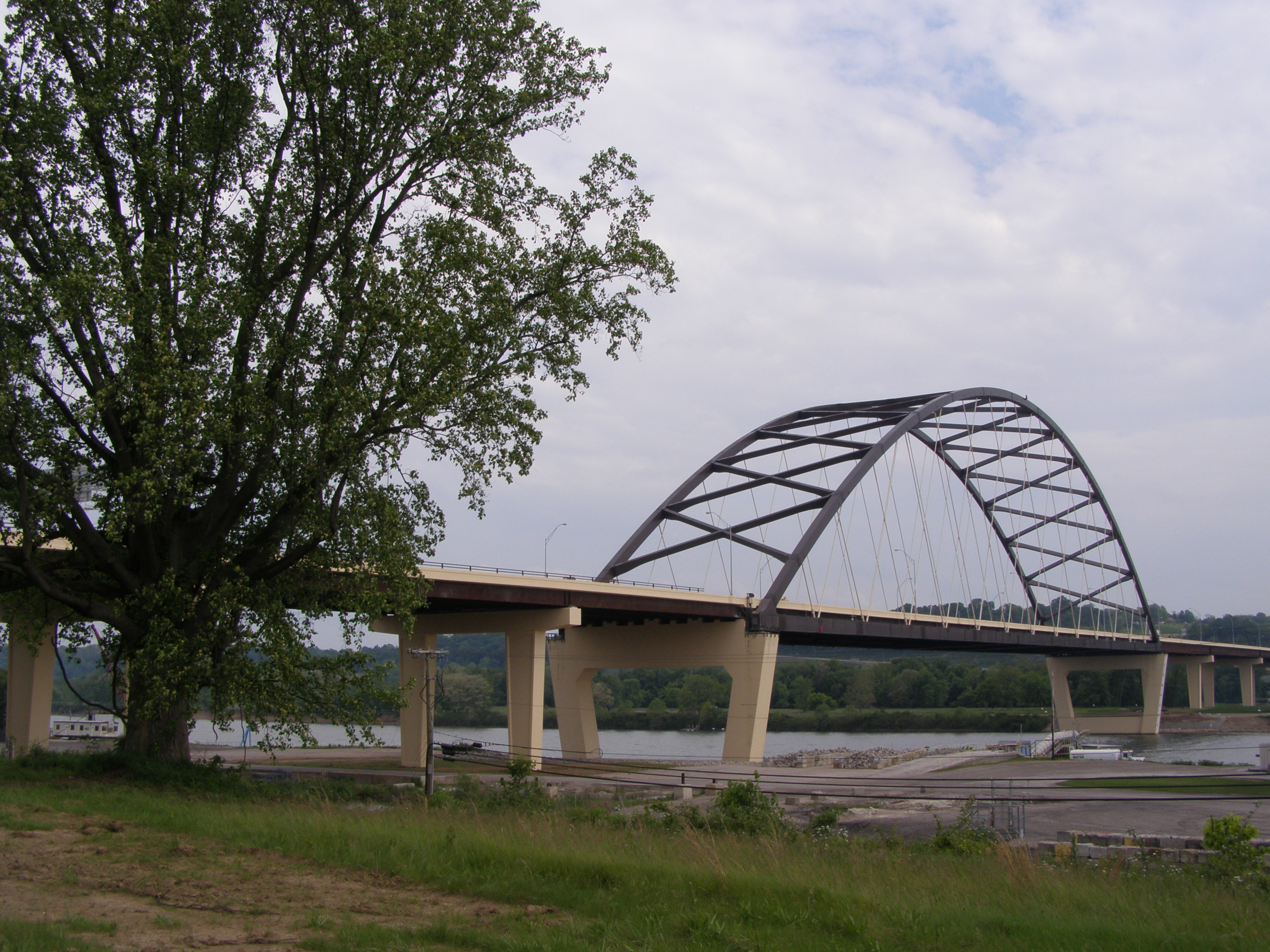
Blennerhassett Island Bridge near Parkersburg, WV.

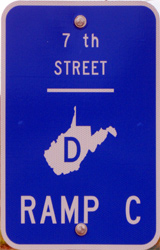
Corridor D ramp marker in Parkersburg, West Virginia showing the symbol WVDOH uses for Appalachian Corridor mile and ramp markers.

One of the original 23 corridors, Corridor D (U.S. Highway 50) was to provide access to major urban centers along the east coast from the midwest, while creating economic development for northwest and North-Central West Virginia and southeast Ohio.

The Blennerhassett Island Bridge, a tied-arch bridge, opened to traffic on June 13, 2008, over the Ohio River thus completing Corridor D in its entirety.

=== West Virginia ===
The earliest segment of Corridor D, or US 50, to open in West Virginia was a six-mile (10 km) segment in 1967 from an isolated point near Sherwood in Doddridge County (MP 15) to WV 23 in Salem in Harrison County (MP 1.52). Two years later, a segment from Salem east to CR 11 at Wolf Summit (MP 7) opened to traffic.

In 1970, major portions of Corridor D opened to traffic:

1. A brief segment in Wood County from MP 8 to MP 11 near Murphytown.
2. A lengthy segment in Wood County from WV 31 near Deerwalk (MP 15.41) to MP 4 at Nutter Farm in Ritchie County near North Bend State Park, a distance of seven miles (11 km).
3. A segment of US 50 in Ritchie County at WV 74 at Pennsboro (MP 17) east to Doddridge County at West Union (MP 5.5).

Most of Corridor D opened a year later.

1. A segment four-lane upgrade of US 50 opened in Wood County from Interstate 77 east of Parkersburg (MP 4) to MP 8 near Murphytown.
2. A segment within Wood County from MP 11 near Murphytown to Sandhill (MP 15.41). This connected the disjointed segments between #1 and #2 listed above.
3. The majority of Ritchie County's US 50 segment opened from MP 4 near North Bend State Park to WV 74 at Pennsboro (MP 17). This connected the disjointed segments between #2 and #3 listed above.
4. A segment in Doddridge County from MP 5.52 near West Union east to WV 23 near Salem (MP 15).

In 1974, a segment of Corridor D in Harrison County opened to traffic from CR 11 at Wolf Summit (MP 7) to the CR 11 at Wilsonburg (MP 11). In 1977, this was extended eastward to WV 20 at Montpelier east of Clarksburg (MP 15.5), and a year later, to Interstate 79 west of Bridgeport (MP 18.25).

==== Completion into Ohio ====
Construction began in 2000 with the start of the Godbey Fields complex in Parkersburg, West Virginia. The $6.5 million 40-acre (160,000 m^{2}) athletic complex was finished in 2001. Several contracts were let soon after, which included grading and drainage for part of Corridor D, a new Corning Glass Bridge for WV 47, and another span that would carry US 50 over WV 47 and 7th Street in Parkersburg.

On September 8, 2003, the first segment of Corridor D opened. The 1.9-mile (3.1 km) four-lane controlled-access highway stretched from Interstate 77 to WV 47 in Parkersburg.

On September 20, 2004, the second portion of Corridor D opened from WV 47 to WV 14, which included the construction of a Little Kanawha River crossing. With this segment open to traffic, 1/3 of the Parkersburg Corridor D segment was complete.

On July 12, 2005, it was announced that the final Corridor D contract in West Virginia was to be awarded. This would complete paving and signing operations of 1.32 miles (2.12 km) from the WV 892, WV 95, and WV 68 interchange to River Hill Road. In Ohio, a single contract was announced that would connect the Ohio River span to U.S. Route 50 which would be completed in 2007.

In August 2005, Corridor D was opened to traffic from WV 14 to WV 68.

In mid-September 2005, Corridor D was completed from Fifth Street in Parkersburg to WV 892, WV 95, and WV 68. This segment was constructed under five contracts and required the completion of ten bridges.

As of April 23, 2006, construction on the Corridor D mainlines from Interstate 77 to WV 892 is all but complete. The last segment, from WV 892 to the WV 892, WV 95, and WV 68 interchange, was slated to open in August.

On August 31, 2006, it was announced that from WV 892/WV 68 to the WV 892 interchange, Corridor D was open to traffic. This 1.32-mile (2.12 km) four-lane divided freeway is the final roadway section of the corridor from Clarksburg and Cincinnati outside of the Ohio River crossing.

On March 9, 2005, a tied arch Ohio River crossing design was chosen from four designs as it was the "most economical and least intrusive on the environment of Blennerhassett Island. The $120 million eight-span bridge, the Blennerhassett Island Bridge, includes an 880-foot (270 m) tied arch over the main channel of the Ohio River and stretches for 4,009 feet (1,222 m) from both abutments with a 69 feet (21 m) vertical clearance. It was constructed from weathering steel and connects WV 892 to OH 618. At the time of its contract letting in April 2005, it was the largest single highway contract in West Virginia's history. It opened on June 13, 2008, the last Corridor D project to be completed.

There are long-range plans to expand the diamond interchange at Interstate 77 into a fully directional interchange at a cost of $60 million. As of 2006 it was ranked 75th.

== Notes ==
- The official sign for Corridor D in West Virginia, while not utilized on full-sized shields, is a blue background shield with a West Virginia state outline in white with a blue letter in the center.
- In late 2006, there were recent additions of mile markers every 1/2 mile along Corridor D between Parkersburg and Clarksburg. These mile markers feature the official sign for Corridor D as described above.

== See also ==
- Northwestern Turnpike
