= West Virginia Route 618 =

State highway in West Virginia, United States

West Virginia Route 618

Route information
- Maintained by WVDOH
- Length: 3.9 mi (6.3 km)
- Existed: January 2005–present

Major junctions
- West end: SR 32 on Parkersburg-Belpre Bridge
- WV 14 / WV 68 in Parkersburg
- East end: US 50 in Parkersburg

Location
- Country: United States
- State: West Virginia
- Counties: Wood

Highway system
- West Virginia State Highway System; Interstate; US; State
← WV 612	→ WV 622

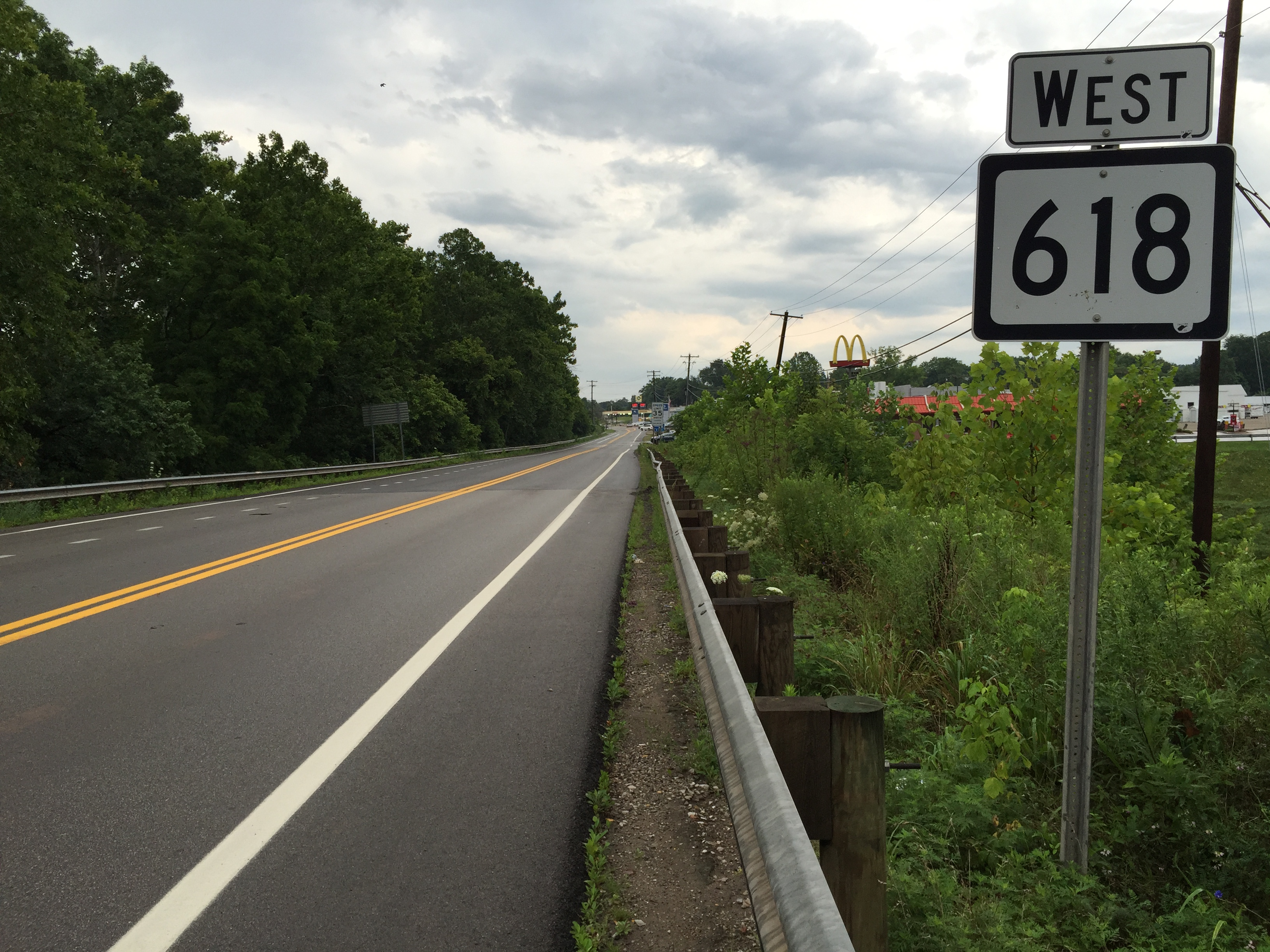
View west near the east end of WV 618 at US 50 in Parkersburg

West Virginia Route 618 is an east–west state highway located almost entirely in Parkersburg, West Virginia. The route follows the former path of U.S. Route 50 through downtown Parkersburg. It was created when US 50 was realigned onto a bypass of Parkersburg constructed as part of an upgrade of Corridor D. The designation is meant as a continuation of Ohio's State Route 618, though that route turns North at the Parkersburg-Belpre Bridge before it would actually meet West Virginia Route 618.

The western terminus of WV 618 is at the Ohio state line on the Parkersburg-Belpre Bridge. The eastern terminus is at an interchange with US 50 just east of Parkersburg.

== Major intersections ==
The entire route is in Wood County.

Location	mi	km	Destinations	Notes
Parkersburg			SR 32 west to SR 7 / SR 618 (Washington Boulevard) – Belpre, Athens, Marietta	Ohio state line (Parkersburg-Belpre Bridge over Ohio River)
Parkersburg			WV 14 south (Fourth Street) / WV 68 south (Ann Street) to I-77 / US 50	west end of WV 14 north / WV 68 north overlap (eastbound only); one-block WV 14 south / WV 68 south / WV 618 east overlap
Parkersburg			WV 14 north / WV 68 north (Eighth Street)	east end of WV 14 north / WV 68 north overlap (eastbound only); one-block WV 14 north / WV 68 north / WV 618 west overlap
Parkersburg			To East Street / WV 95	former WV 14 Alt. south
Parkersburg			WV 47 east (Staunton Avenue) to I-77	
			US 50 to I-77 / East 7th Street – Marietta, OH, Charleston, Clarksburg, Athens, OH	interchange
1.000 mi = 1.609 km; 1.000 km = 0.621 mi: Concurrency terminus
