= West Virginia Route 14 =

State highway in West Virginia, United States

West Virginia Route 14

Route information
- Maintained by WVDOH
- Length: 59.0 mi (95.0 km)

Major junctions
- South end: US 33 in Spencer
- WV 5 at Elizabeth; I-77 / WV 2 at Mineral Wells; US 50 at Parkersburg
- North end: I-77 / WV 31 in Williamstown

Location
- Country: United States
- State: West Virginia
- Counties: Roane, Wirt, Wood

Highway system
- West Virginia State Highway System; Interstate; US; State
← WV 12	→ WV 15

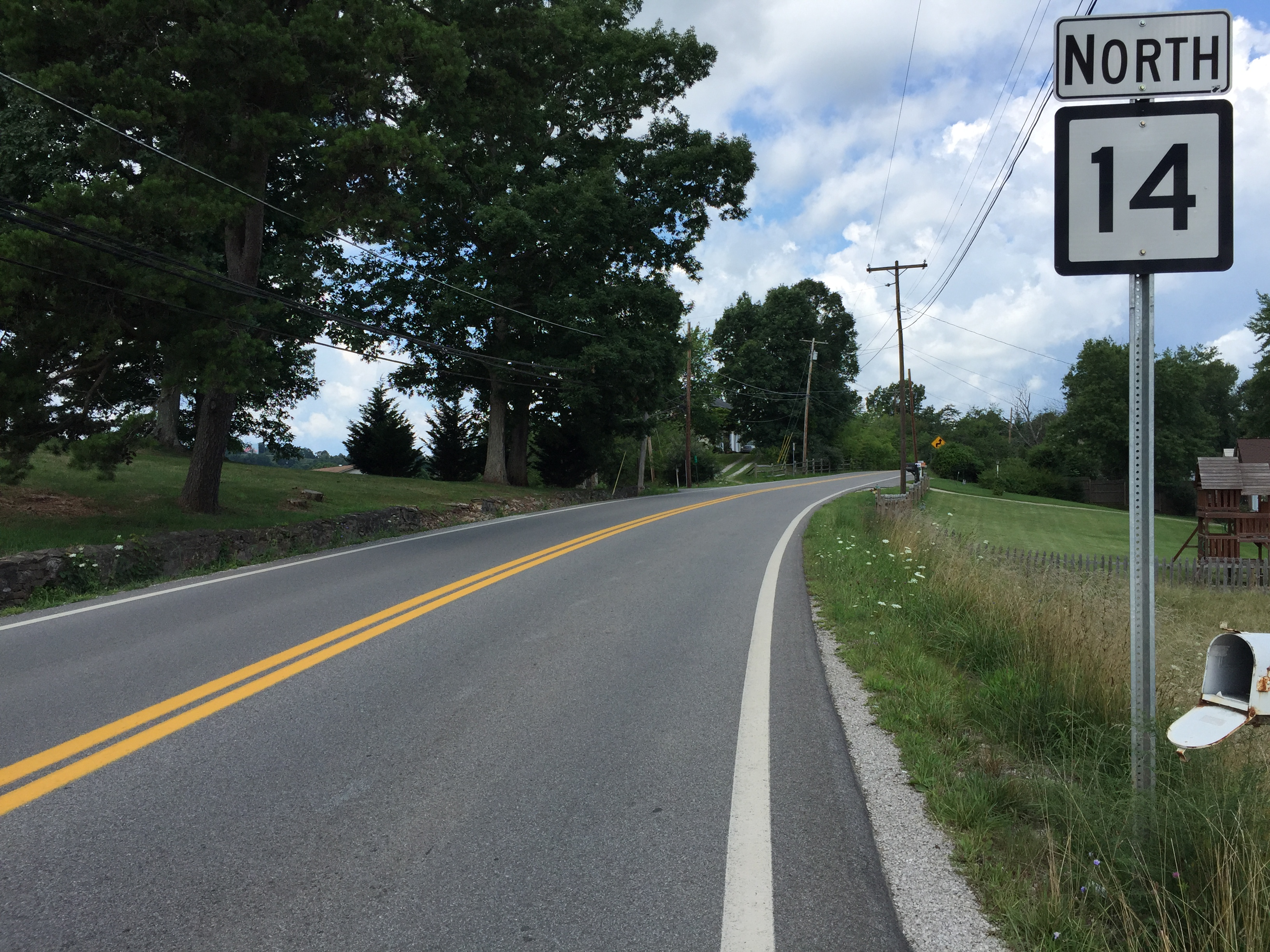
View north along WV 14 just north of Spencer

West Virginia Route 14 is a north–south state highway in the western portion of the U.S. state of West Virginia. The southern terminus of the route is at U.S. Route 33 in Spencer, Roane County. The northern terminus is at Interstate 77 exit 185 and West Virginia Route 31 on the southern outskirts of Williamstown, Wood County.

The portion of the road from Williamstown to Mineral Wells in Wood County was part of U.S. Route 21 until US 21 was decommissioned statewide in 1974.

== Major intersections ==
County	Location	mi	km	Destinations	Notes
Roane	Spencer			US 33 – Glenville, Ripley	
Wirt	Elizabeth			WV 5 east – Grantsville	
Wood				CR 21 south (Southern Highway)	former US 21
Wood				I-77 / WV 2 – Charleston, Parkersburg	I-77 exit 170
Wood	Parkersburg			WV 95 west – Lubeck	south end of WV 95 overlap
Wood	Parkersburg			WV 95 east (Camden Avenue) to I-77	north end of WV 95 overlap
Wood	Parkersburg			US 50 to I-77 – Athens, OH, Clarksburg	interchange
Wood	Parkersburg			WV 68 south (Ann Street) / WV 618 west (Fifth Street / Parkersburg-Belpre Bridge) to SR 7	south end of WV 68 overlap; south end of WV 618 overlap (northbound only)
Wood	Parkersburg			WV 618 east (Seventh Street)	north end of WV 618 overlap (northbound only)
Wood	Parkersburg			WV 68 north (Emerson Avenue) to I-77 / SR 7 / Memorial Bridge – Belpre, OH, St. Marys	north end of WV 68 overlap
Wood	Williamstown			To Highland Avenue (WV 31 north) / SR 7 – Marietta, OH	south end of WV 31 overlap; to Williamstown Bridge
Wood	Williamstown			WV 31 south – Airport	north end of WV 31 overlap
Wood				I-77 – Marietta, OH, Parkersburg	I-77 exit 185
1.000 mi = 1.609 km; 1.000 km = 0.621 mi: Concurrency terminus
