= Worst Cooks in America season 18 =

Worst Cooks in America
- Season 18
- Judges: Alton Brown; Anne Burrell
- No. of contestants: 16
- Winner: Shannon Akins
- Winning mentor: Anne Burrell
- Runner-up: Leo Lech
- No. of episodes: 10

Release
- Original network: Food Network
- Original release: January 5 – March 8, 2020

Season chronology
- ← Previous; Season 17 Next → Season 19

Worst Cooks in America 18, is the eighteenth season of the American competitive reality television series Worst Cooks in America. It premiered on Food Network on January 5, 2020 and concluded on March 8, 2020. Shannon Akins was the winner of this season, with Leo Lech as the runner-up.

== Format ==
Worst Cooks in America is an American reality television series in which contestants (referred to as "recruits") with poor cooking skills undergo a culinary boot camp for the chance to win $25,000 and a Food Network cooking set. The recruits are trained on the various basic cooking techniques including baking, knife skills, temperature, seasoning and preparation. Each episode features two core challenges: the Skills Drill, which tests their grasp of basic techniques demonstrated by the chef mentors, and the Main Dish Challenge, where they must apply those skills to recreate or invent a more complex dish under specific guidelines. The weakest performer is eliminated at the end of each episode. The final two contestants prepare a restaurant-quality, three-course meal for a panel of food critics, who evaluate the dishes based on taste, presentation, and overall improvement.

== Judges ==
Alton Brown joins Anne Burrell to host season 18. The season, featuring 16 recruits, premiered on January 5, 2020.

== Recruits ==
Contestant	Age	Hometown	Occupation	Team	Status
Shannon Akins	24	Tempe, Arizona	Aspiring Cosmetologist	Anne	Winner on March 8, 2020
Leo Lech	58	Washington, West Virginia	Chemist	Alton	Runner-up on March 8, 2020
Leslie Rivera-Silva	35	Washington, D.C.	Hairstylist	Anne	Eliminated on March 1, 2020
Kelly Ngoc Mac	55	Pasadena, California	Fitness Instructor	Alton	Eliminated on March 1, 2020
Michael "Mike" Jones-Better	24	Philadelphia, Pennsylvania	EMT	Alton	Eliminated on February 23, 2020
Bridget Praytor	41	Colorado Springs, Colorado	Volleyball Coach	Anne	Eliminated on February 23, 2020
Monica Colwell	25	Hazard, Kentucky	ER Records Coordinator	Alton	Eliminated on February 9, 2020
Dr. Lulu Boykin	67	Pittsboro, North Carolina	Teaching Artist	Anne	Eliminated on February 9, 2020
Jefferson Goldie	36	Chicago, Illinois	Concierge	Alton	Eliminated on February 2, 2020
Ryan Grovey	30	Phoenix, Arizona	Mortician/Fitness Instructor	Anne	Eliminated on February 2, 2020
Jolynn Singh	52	Allen, Texas	Nurse	Alton	Eliminated on January 26, 2020
Curtis Long	38	Seneca, South Carolina	Plumber	Anne	Eliminated on January 26, 2020
Kevin So	24	Brooklyn, New York	Online Marketing	Alton	Eliminated on January 12, 2020
Alexandra "Alex" Tiso	23	Eastchester, New York	Radio Promotions Assistant	Anne	Eliminated on January 12, 2020
Joe Deese	30	Fultondale, Alabama	Inventory Clerk	Alton	Eliminated on January 5, 2020
Dakota Klaes	30	New York, New York	Account Executive	Anne	Eliminated on January 5, 2020

== Elimination Chart ==
Team Anne
Team Alton

Rank	Contestant	Episode									
Rank	Contestant	1	2	3	4	5	6	7	8	9	10
1	Shannon	IN	WIN	IN	IN	WIN	WIN	BTM	WIN	WIN	WINNER
2	Leo	WIN	IN	IN	IN	WIN	WIN	BTM	WIN	WIN	RUNNER-UP
3	Leslie	WIN	IN	IN	BTM	IN	BTM	BTM	BTM	OUT	
4	Kelly	BTM	WIN	BTM	IN	IN	BTM	WIN	BTM	OUT	
5	Mike	IN	IN	WIN	IN	IN	IN	BTM	OUT		
6	Bridget	BTM	IN	WIN	IN	IN	IN	WIN	OUT		
7	Monica	IN	IN	IN	BTM	BTM	OUT				
8	Lulu	IN	BTM	BTM	WIN	BTM	OUT				
9	Jefferson	IN	IN	IN	IN	OUT					
10	Ryan	IN	IN	IN	IN	OUT					
11	Jolynn	IN	BTM	BTM	OUT						
12	Curtis	IN	IN	BTM	OUT						
13	Kevin	IN	OUT								
14	Alex	IN	OUT								
15	Joe	OUT									
16	Dakota	OUT									

Key
(WINNER) This contestant won the competition and was crowned "Best of the Worst".
(RUNNER-UP) The contestant was the runner-up in the finals of the competition.
(WIN) The contestant did the best on their team in the week's Main Dish challenge or Skill Drill and was considered the winner.
(BTM) The contestant was selected as one of the bottom entries in the Main Dish challenge, but was not eliminated.
(OUT) The contestant lost that week's Main Dish challenge and was out of the competition.

== Episodes ==
No. overall	No. in season	Title	Original release date
130	1	"Bottom's Up"	January 5, 2020
131	2	"Indulge Me"	January 12, 2020
132	3	"Chinese New Year"	January 19, 2020
133	4	"Simple Yet Sophisticated"	January 26, 2020
134	5	"Let's Get Ready to Tailgate"	February 2, 2020
135	6	"Opposites Attract"	February 9, 2020
136	7	"Amore Sucre"	February 16, 2020
137	8	"Incognito Cuisine"	February 23, 2020
138	9	"High Steaks"	March 1, 2020
139	10	"The Final Countdown"	March 8, 2020
