= Parkersburg–Belpre Bridge =

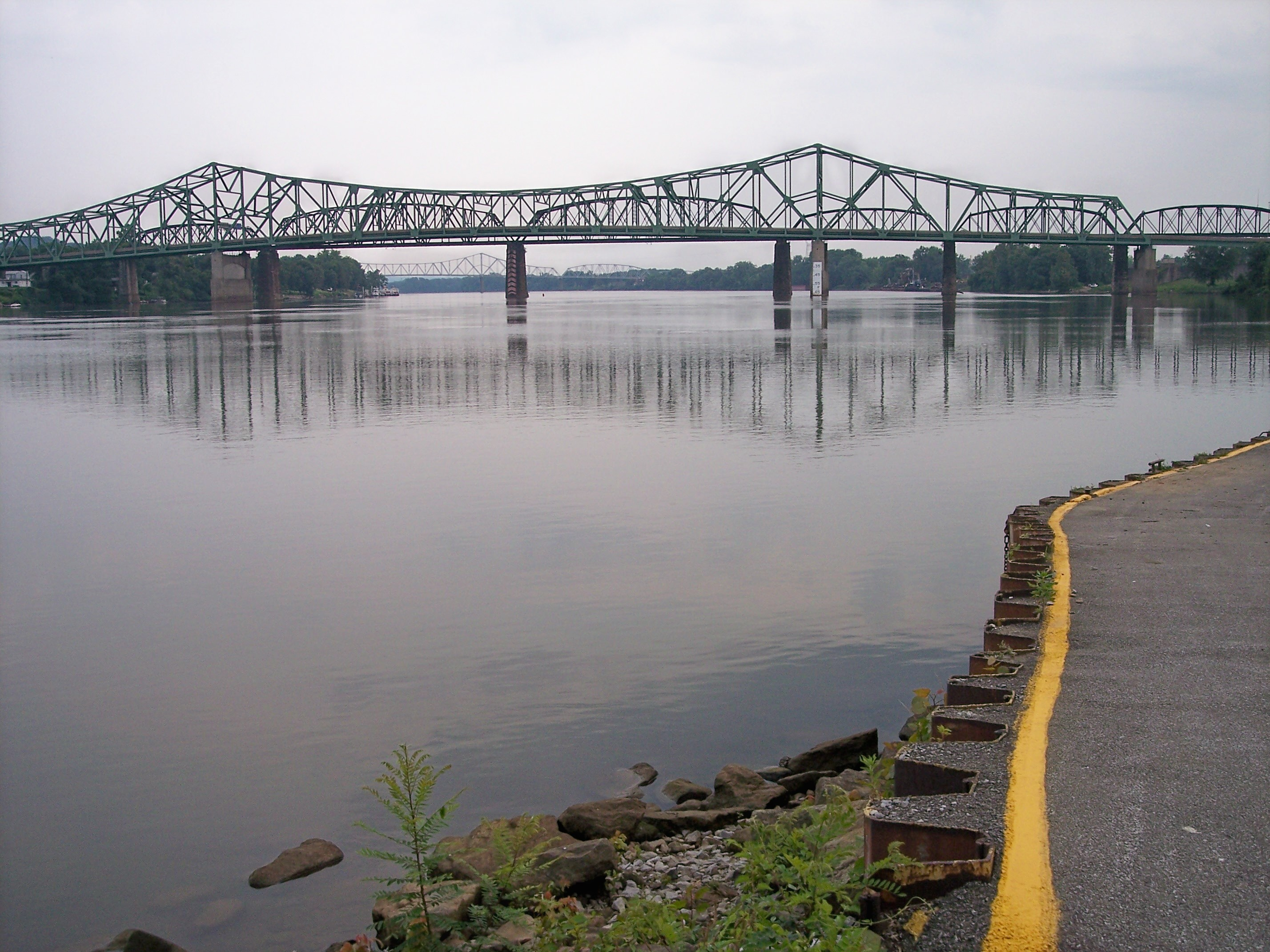
- The Parkersburg–Belpre Bridge (foreground), the Parkersburg CSX Bridge, and the Memorial Bridge in 2006
- Coordinates: 39°16′15″N 81°33′58″W
- Carries: US 50/ SR 32/ WV 618
- Crosses: Ohio River
- Locale: Parkersburg, West Virginia
- Owner: West Virginia Department of Transportation

Characteristics
- No. of lanes: 4

History
- Opened: 1980
- Replaces: Parkersburg Suspension Bridge

The Parkersburg–Belpre Bridge is a four-lane cantilever bridge that connects Parkersburg, West Virginia, to Belpre, Ohio, across the Ohio River. The bridge was completed in 1980. The bridge had been signed U.S. Route 50 (US 50) until June 13, 2008, when that highway was re-routed to the Blennerhassett Island Bridge a few miles to the west, as part of the completion of the Corridor D project around Parkersburg. The American Discovery Trail uses the bridge to cross the Ohio River.

== Parkersburg Suspension Bridge ==
The current bridge replaced a 1916 suspension bridge located just downstream of the present site. The bridge was designed by Hermann Lamb and built by the John A. Roebling's Sons Company of New Jersey. The bridge had a 22-foot-wide (6.7 m) deck, which included a pedestrian walkway. The main span was 775 feet (236 m) and the side spans were 275 feet (84 m) and 375 feet (114 m). The suspension bridge was demolished on March 16, 1980.

== See also ==
- List of bridges documented by the Historic American Engineering Record in Ohio
- List of bridges documented by the Historic American Engineering Record in West Virginia
- List of crossings of the Ohio River
