= West Virginia Route 68 =

North–south state highway in northwest West Virginia

West Virginia Route 68

Route information
- Maintained by WVDOH
- Length: 34.9 mi (56.2 km)

Major junctions
- South end: US 33 / WV 2 in Ravenswood
- US 50 in Parkersburg; WV 14 in Parkersburg
- North end: I-77 / WV 2 near Parkersburg

Location
- Country: United States
- State: West Virginia
- Counties: Jackson, Wood

Highway system
- West Virginia State Highway System; Interstate; US; State
← I-68	→ WV 69

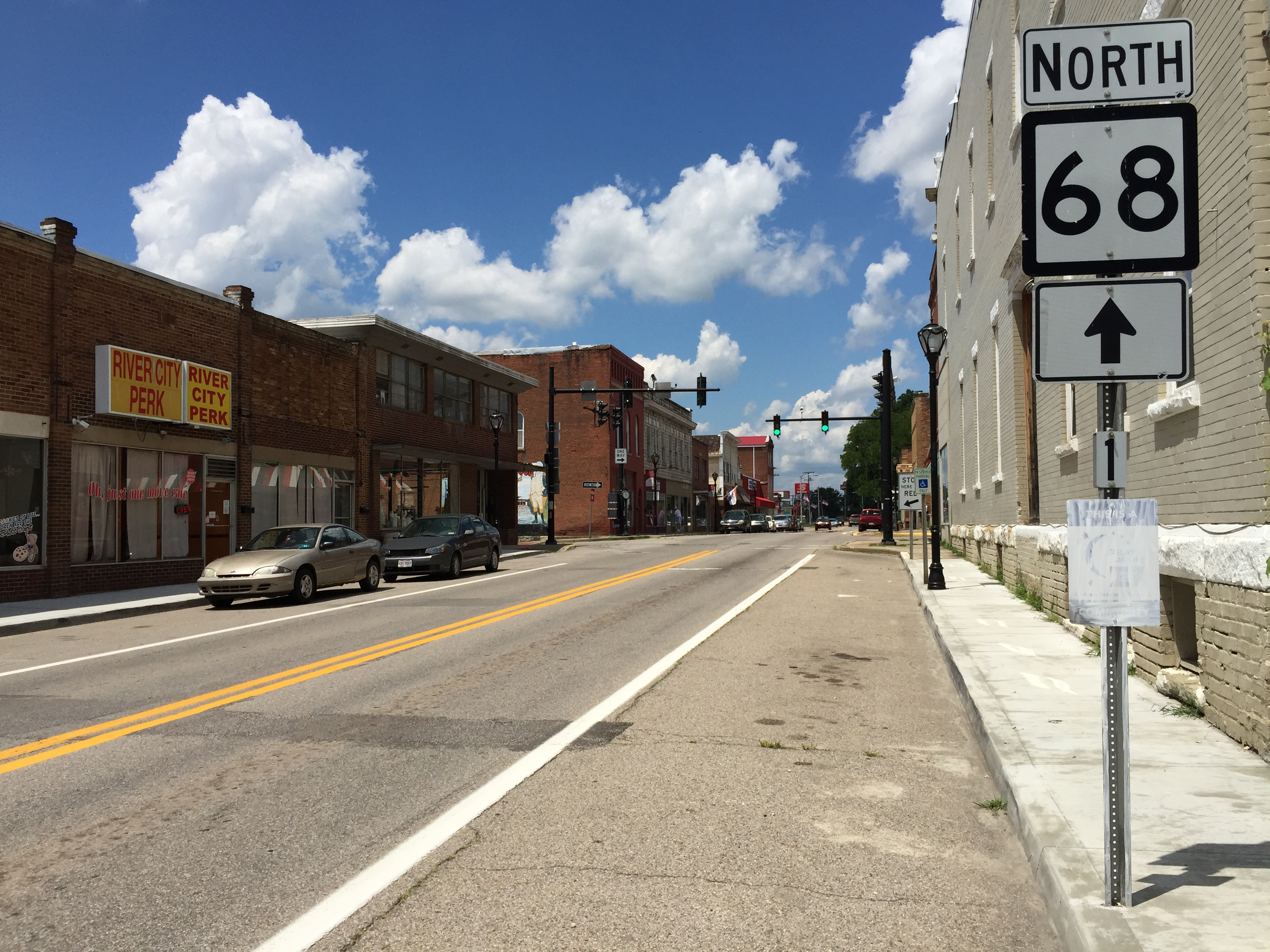
View north along WV 68 in Ravenswood

West Virginia Route 68 is a north–south state highway in northwest West Virginia. The southern terminus of the route is at West Virginia Route 2 on the southern outskirts of Ravenswood. The northern terminus is at Interstate 77/WV 2 exit 179 northeast of Parkersburg. WV 2, concurrent with I-77 south of this location, departs the expressway and continues north on the same roadway as WV 68.

== History ==
Before Interstate 77 was completed, State Route 2 followed the Ohio River (more or less) from St. Marys, south through Parkersburg, and on southward along the river to Ravenswood, and further toward Huntington. When Interstate 77 was completed, State Route 2 was re-routed along Interstate 77 from the point where the two crossed, north of Parkersburg, to the point where Interstate 77 passes by Ravenswood. At that point, State Route 2 left Interstate 77 and continued along its former route. But the portion between where State Route 2 crossed Interstate 77 north of Parkersburg, and where it rejoined its original route in Ravenswood was established as State Route 68. It passes through downtown Parkersburg, and continues along the old State Route 2 route south to Ravenswood. It is the only state route in West Virginia that shares a number with an interstate or U.S. highway, due to the commissioning of Interstate 68 in 1991.

== Major intersections ==
County	Location	mi	km	Destinations	Notes
Jackson	Ravenswood			US 33 east / WV 2 to I-77 – Point Pleasant	south end of US 33 overlap
Jackson	Ravenswood			US 33 west (Ravenswood Bridge) – Columbus, OH	north end of US 33 overlap
Wood				WV 892 north – Washington	
Wood				WV 95 east	
Wood				US 50 west / WV 892 south (Dupont Road) – Athens, OH	interchange; south end of US 50 overlap
Wood	Marrtown			CR 9 (Marrtown Road)	interchange
Wood				US 50 east to I-77 – Clarksburg	interchange; northbound exit and southbound entrance; north end of US 50 overlap
Wood	Parkersburg			WV 14 south (Fourth Street) to I-77 / US 50	south end of WV 14 overlap
Wood	Parkersburg			WV 618 west (Fifth Street / Parkersburg-Belpre Bridge) to SR 7	south end of WV 618 overlap (northbound only)
Wood	Parkersburg			WV 618 east (Seventh Street)	north end of WV 618 overlap (northbound only)
Wood	Parkersburg			WV 14 north to SR 7 / Memorial Bridge – Vienna, Belpre, OH	north end of WV 14 overlap
Wood				I-77 / WV 2 – St. Marys, Marietta, Charleston	I-77 exit 179
1.000 mi = 1.609 km; 1.000 km = 0.621 mi: Concurrency terminus
