= West Virginia Route 892 =

State highway in West Virginia, United States

West Virginia Route 892

Route information
- Maintained by WVDOH
- Length: 9.95 mi (16.01 km)

Major junctions
- South end: WV 68 south of Lubeck
- North end: US 50 / WV 68 north of Lubeck

Location
- Country: United States
- State: West Virginia
- Counties: Wood

Highway system
- West Virginia State Highway System; Interstate; US; State
← WV 891	→ WV 901

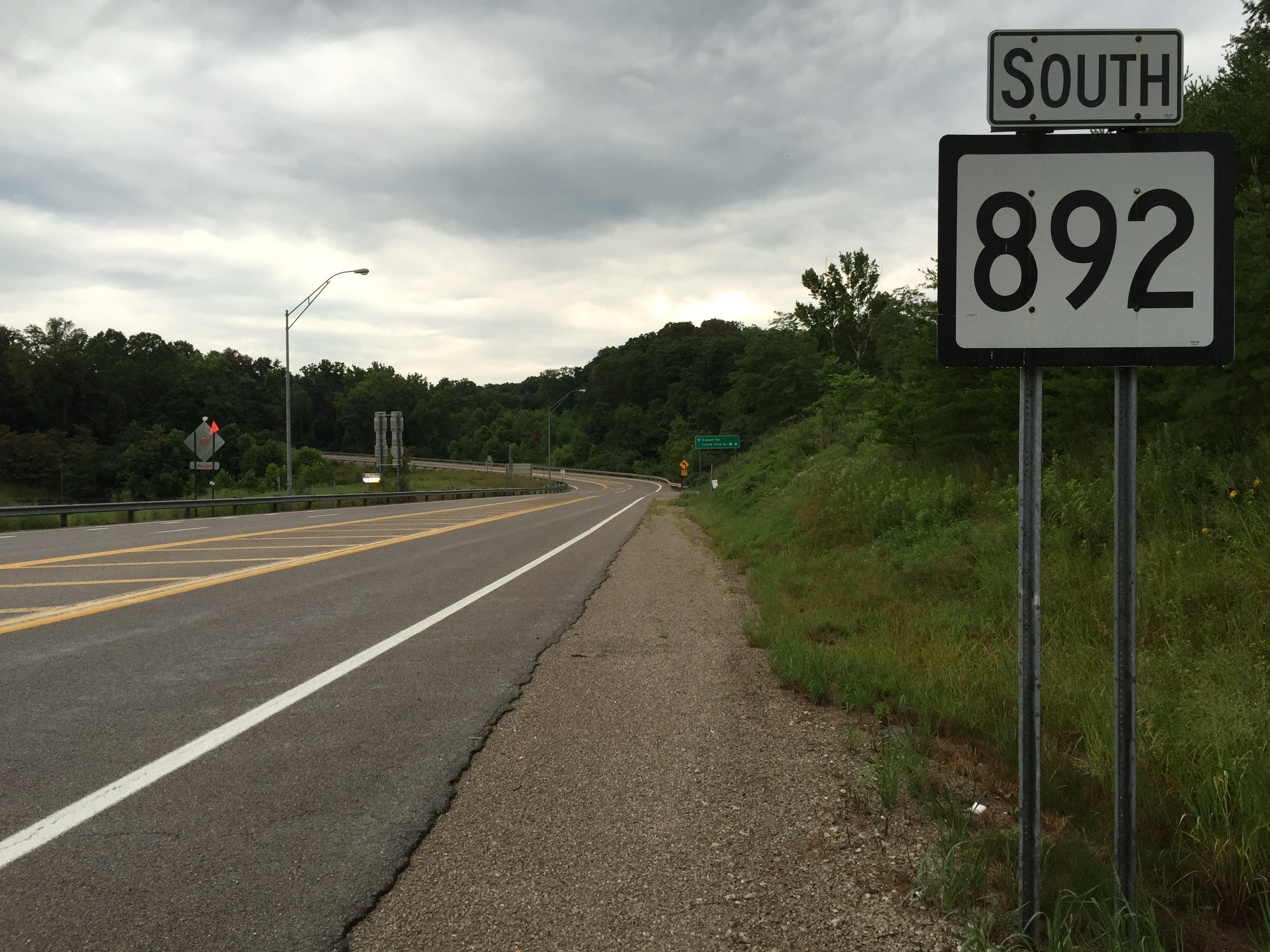
View south along WV 892 at US 50 in Lubeck

West Virginia Route 892 is a north–south state highway located in Wood County, West Virginia. The southern terminus of the route is at West Virginia Route 68 south of Lubeck. The northern terminus is at U.S. Route 50 and WV 68 north of Lubeck.

The route is a large loop route, connecting the Ohio River community of Washington to WV 68.

== Major intersections ==
The entire route is in Wood County.

Location	mi	km	Destinations	Notes
	0.00	0.00	WV 68 – Parkersburg, Ravenswood	
			CR 11 (New England Ridge Road)	
			US 50 to I-77 – Athens, OH, Parkersburg	interchange
	9.95	16.01	US 50 / WV 68 to I-77 – Ravenswood, Parkersburg, Athens, OH	interchange
1.000 mi = 1.609 km; 1.000 km = 0.621 mi
