= Bugrinsky Bridge =

Road bridge in Novosibirsk, Russia

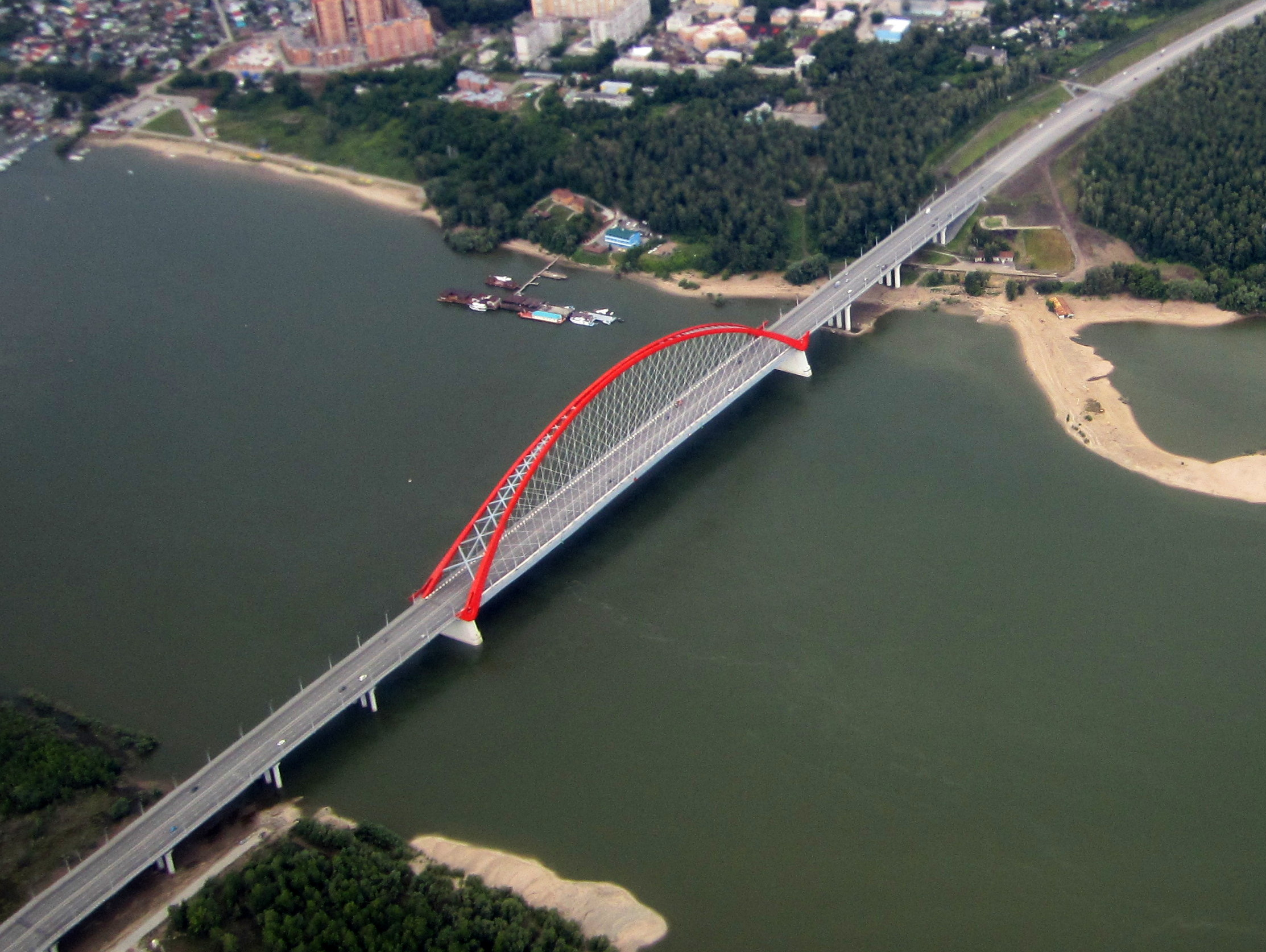
- Bugrinsky Bridge from an airplane
- Coordinates: 54°58′30″N 82°57′45″E
- Crosses: Ob River
- Locale: Novosibirsk, Russia

Characteristics
- Design: Network arch bridge
- Total length: 2095.7 m
- Width: 34.56 m
- Longest span: 380 m

History
- Opened: 2014

Location
- Interactive map of Bugrinsky Bridge

The Bugrinsky Bridge (Russian: Бугри́нский мост, Bugrinsky Most) is a road bridge over the Ob River in Novosibirsk, Russia. It is the third automobile bridge over the Ob River in the city of Novosibirsk.

== Name ==
The former name "Olovozavodskoy" bridge was later changed to Bugrinsky because it crosses the Bugrinskaya grove on the left bank of the Ob, which is located next to one of the world's largest tin factories. Former city Mayor Vladimir Gorodetsky noted that the name "Olovozavodskoy" is two decades old and already outdated. On December, 3rd 2013 a commission decided unanimously to name the third bridge over the Ob River in Novosibirsk as "Bugrinsky".

== History ==
The construction of the bridge began in February 2010 and finished in October 2014. The bridge was opened on 8 October 2014 by President Vladimir Putin, making it the third bridge over the Ob River. The bridge received the FIDIC Award of Merit for its innovation, quality and sustainability in 2016.

== Technical specifications ==
The bridge has a length of 2,091 meters and a width of 34.5 meters. Its arch stands at a height of 70 meters. It has a central span length of 380 meters. The bridge carries 6 lanes of roads.

== Gallery ==
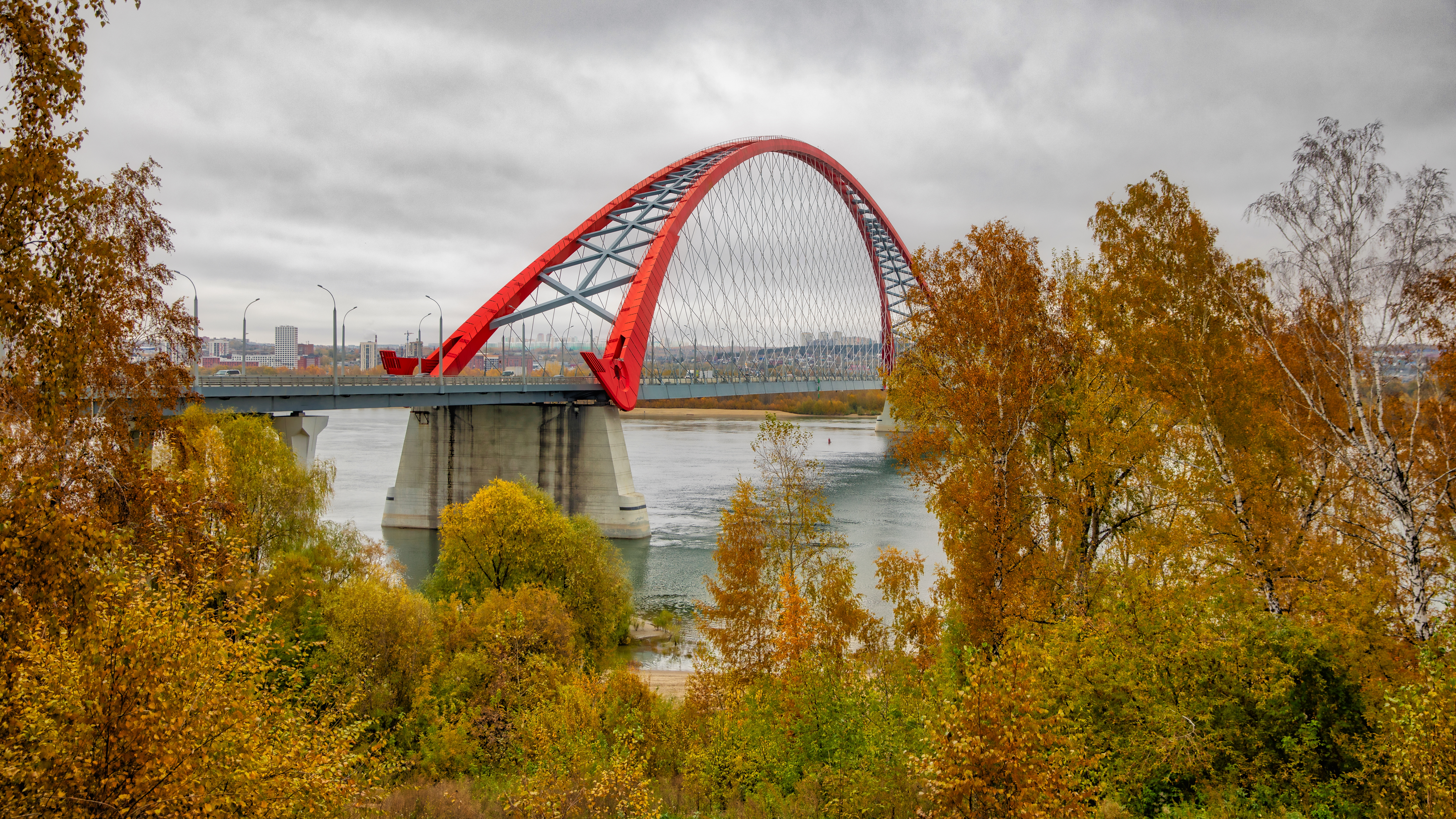
Bugrinsky Bridge in 2017
