= West Virginia Route 95 =

State highway in West Virginia, United States

West Virginia Route 95

Route information
- Maintained by WVDOH
- Length: 6.2 mi (10.0 km)

Major junctions
- West end: WV 68 near Parkersburg
- WV 14 in Parkersburg
- East end: I-77 / WV 2 in Parkersburg

Location
- Country: United States
- State: West Virginia
- Counties: Wood

Highway system
- West Virginia State Highway System; Interstate; US; State
← WV 94	→ WV 97

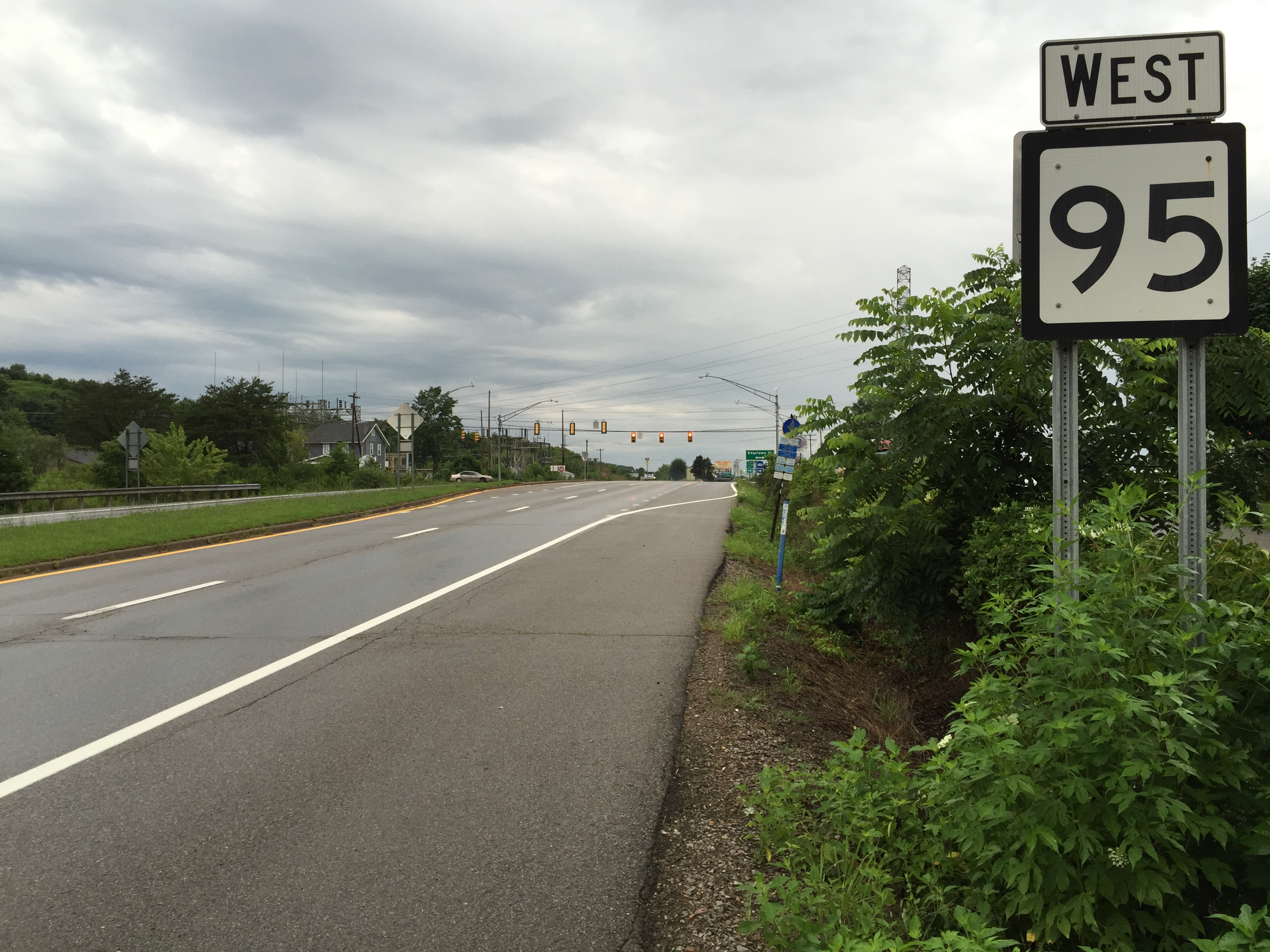
View west along WV 95 just west of I-77 in Parkersburg

West Virginia Route 95 is an east–west state highway in the Parkersburg, West Virginia area. The western terminus of the route is at West Virginia Route 68 west of Parkersburg. The eastern terminus is at Interstate 77/West Virginia Route 2 exit 173 in Parkersburg.

== Major intersections ==
The entire route is in Wood County.

Location	mi	km	Destinations	Notes
			WV 68 to US 50 / Dupont Road (WV 892) – Lubeck, Ravenswood	
Parkersburg			CR 32 (Gihon Road)	interchange
Parkersburg			WV 14 south (Blizzard Drive) – Mineral Wells	west end of WV 14 overlap
Parkersburg			WV 14 north (5th Street) to US 50 / I-77 – Downtown Parkersburg	east end of WV 14 overlap
Parkersburg			I-77 / WV 2 – Marietta, OH, Charleston	I-77 exit 173
1.000 mi = 1.609 km; 1.000 km = 0.621 mi: Concurrency terminus
