= Network arch bridge =

Type of arch bridge

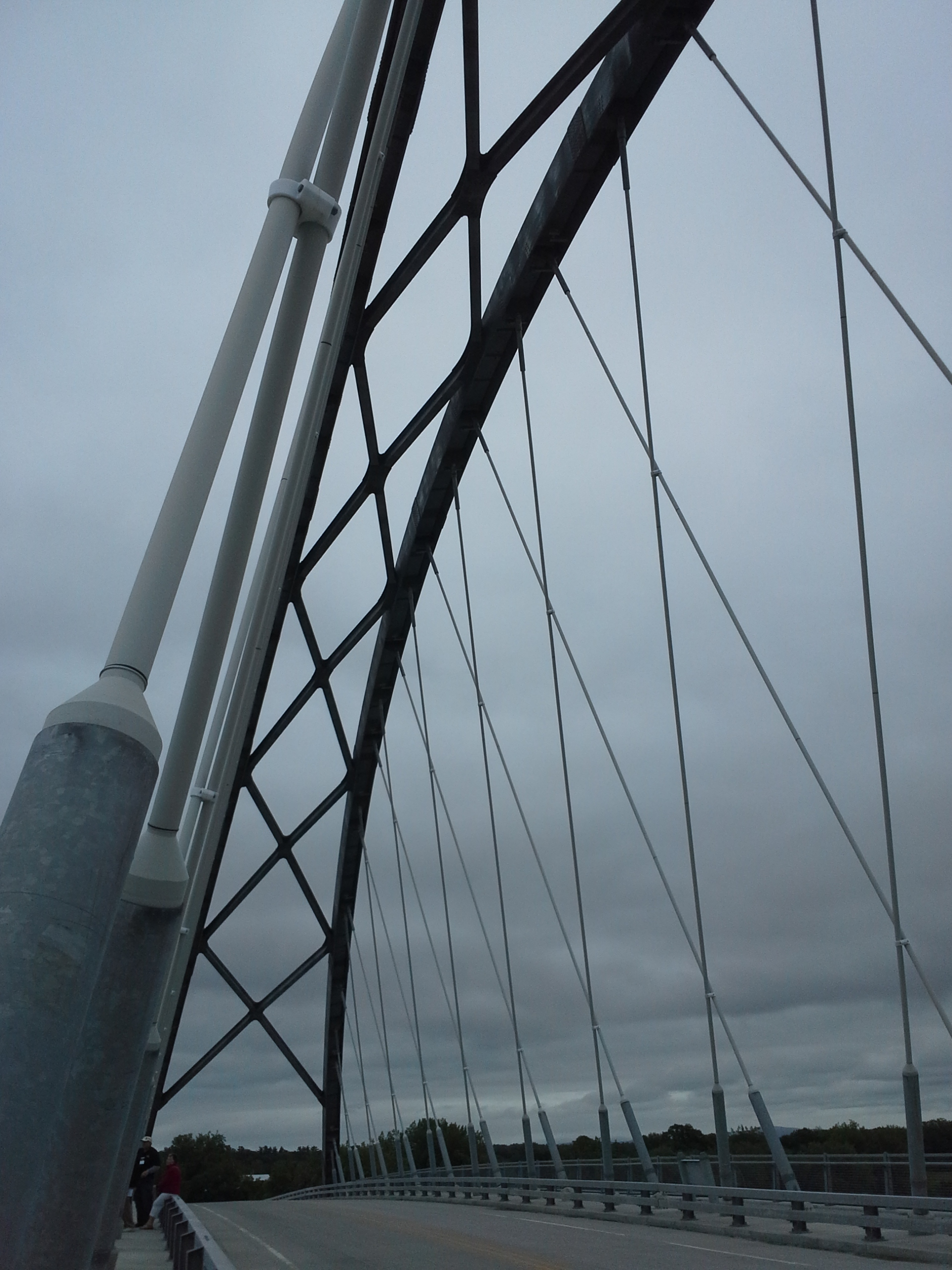
The crossed suspender cables characteristic of the network tied arch, as shown on the Lake Champlain Bridge

A network arch bridge is a tied arch bridge with inclined hangers that cross each other at least twice.

== Structure ==
The inclined hangers with multiple intersections make the network arch bridge act like a truss, with only axial compressible and tensile forces. Bending moments and shear forces are very small in network arches.

The hanger arrangement is what separates network tied arch structures from other types of tied arches, such as those with vertical hangers. It is defined by the number of hangers, hanger inclination and hanger distance. A radial hanger arrangement provides an efficient structure, as shown by Benjamin Brunn and Frank Schanack in 2003. In the radial hanger arrangement the distances between the upper hanger nodes and the angle between hangers and arch remain constant. In order to avoid too long hangers this angle may be increased towards the bridge ends.

== History ==
The network arch idea was developed by the Norwegian engineer Per Tveit in the end of the 1950s.

== Advantages ==
Because both the arch and the tie are mainly subject to axial forces, their cross sections can be very small. Usually, transverse bending in the deck is bigger than bending in longitudinal direction. Therefore, a concrete deck that spans between the arches is a good solution for bridges with arch distances that are not too large. The concrete deck has longitudinal prestressing tendons in the arch planes.

== Difference to Nielsen-Lohse-Bridges ==
In Japan, tied arch bridges with crossing hangers are wrongly called Nielsen-Lohse bridge. Engineer Octavius F. Nielsen applied for a patent on tied arches with inclined hanger rods in 1926. This bridge type was then built about 60 times, primarily in Sweden. None of these bridges had crossed hangers.

A drawback to the Nielsen type is that if there are dynamic loads on the bridge, the tension on some of these hangers may be reduced, even putting the hanger into compression. The network arch type, with multiple crossings, i.e. overlap in the horizontal axis, was developed by Per Tveit to avoid this.

Lohse bridges have a tie conversely curved to the arch. The bridge deck is supported by a third structural element hanging underneath. They are named for the German engineer Hermann Lohse (1815–1893) who developed them in the late 19th century.

The correct name of tied arch bridges with inclined hangers that cross each other at most once is Nielsen bridge. Tied arches with hangers with multiple intersections are network arch bridges. This strict rule is justified, because it leads to a more efficient structure.

== Examples ==
- Bolstadstraumen Bridge, Norway (1963)
- Fehmarnsund Bridge, Germany (1963)
- Lake Champlain Bridge USA, (2011)
- Providence River Bridge, USA (2008)
- Håkkadalsbrua, Steinkjer, Norway (1963)
- Blennerhassett Island Bridge, USA (2008)
- George C. King Bridge, Canada (2014)
- Troja Bridge, Prague, Czech Republic (2014)
- Bugrinsky Bridge, Novosibirsk, Siberia (2014)
- Ordsall Chord, United Kingdom (2017)
- Portal North Bridge, USA (2026)
