= Blennerhassett Island Bridge =

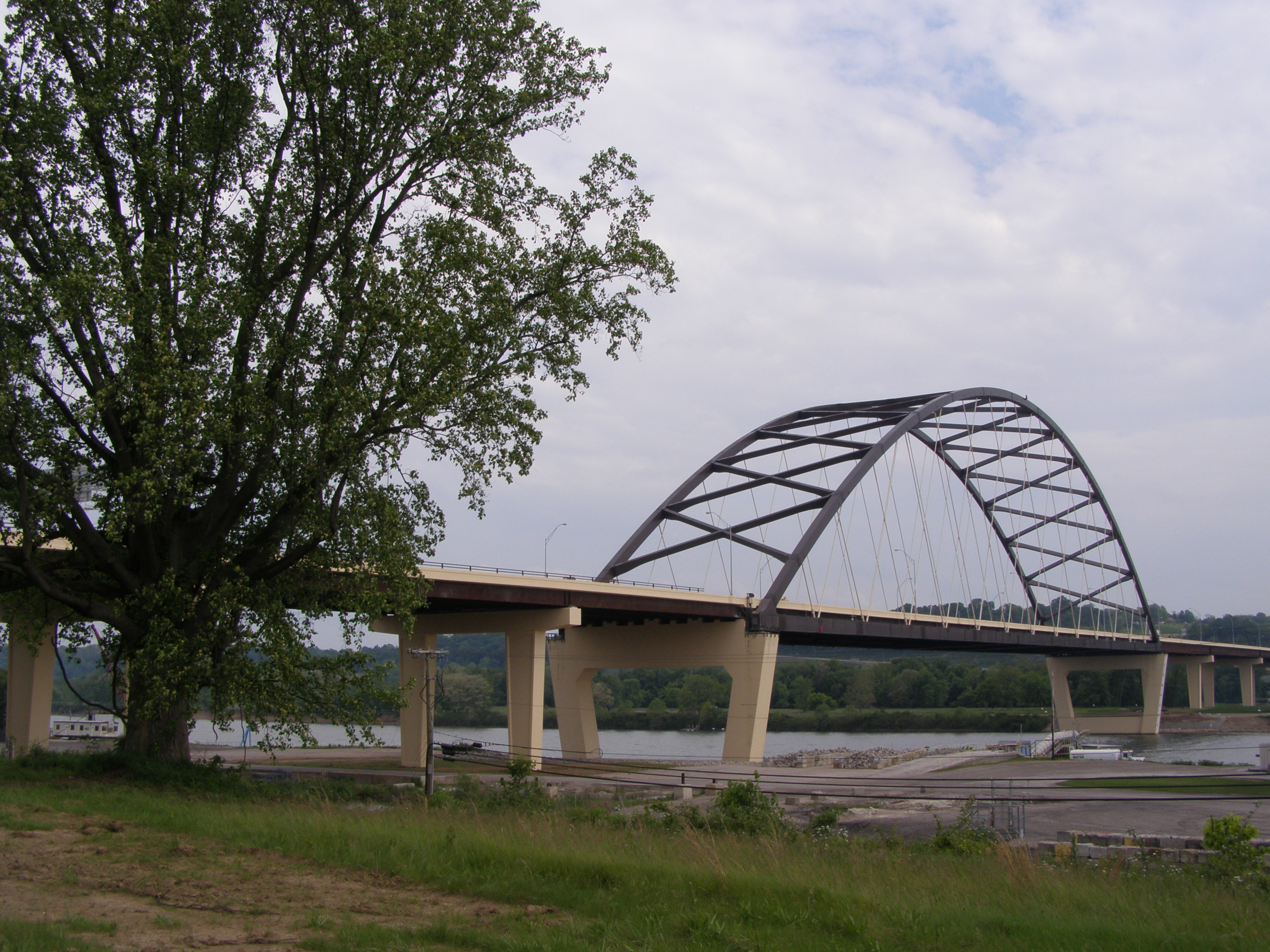
- Coordinates: 39°16′36″N 81°38′49″W
- Carries: 4 lanes of US 50
- Crosses: Ohio River
- Locale: Belpre Township, Ohio and Washington, West Virginia
- Maintained by: West Virginia Department of Transportation

Characteristics
- Design: Network Arch Bridge
- Total length: 4,009 feet (1,222 m)
- Width: 107 feet (33 m)
- Longest span: 878 feet (268 m)
- Clearance below: 76 feet (23 m)

History
- Opened: June 13, 2008

Location
- Interactive map of Blennerhassett Island Bridge

Blennerhassett Island Bridge, with a network arch design, carries U.S. Route 50 (Appalachian Development Highway System's Corridor D) over the Ohio River and the historic Blennerhassett Island between Belpre Township, Ohio and Washington, West Virginia in the United States. Construction of the bridge was overseen by the Walsh Construction Company of Chicago, and it opened to traffic on June 13, 2008. The completion of the span completed Corridor D between Interstate 275 east of Cincinnati to Interstate 79 at Clarksburg, West Virginia.

== Photo gallery ==
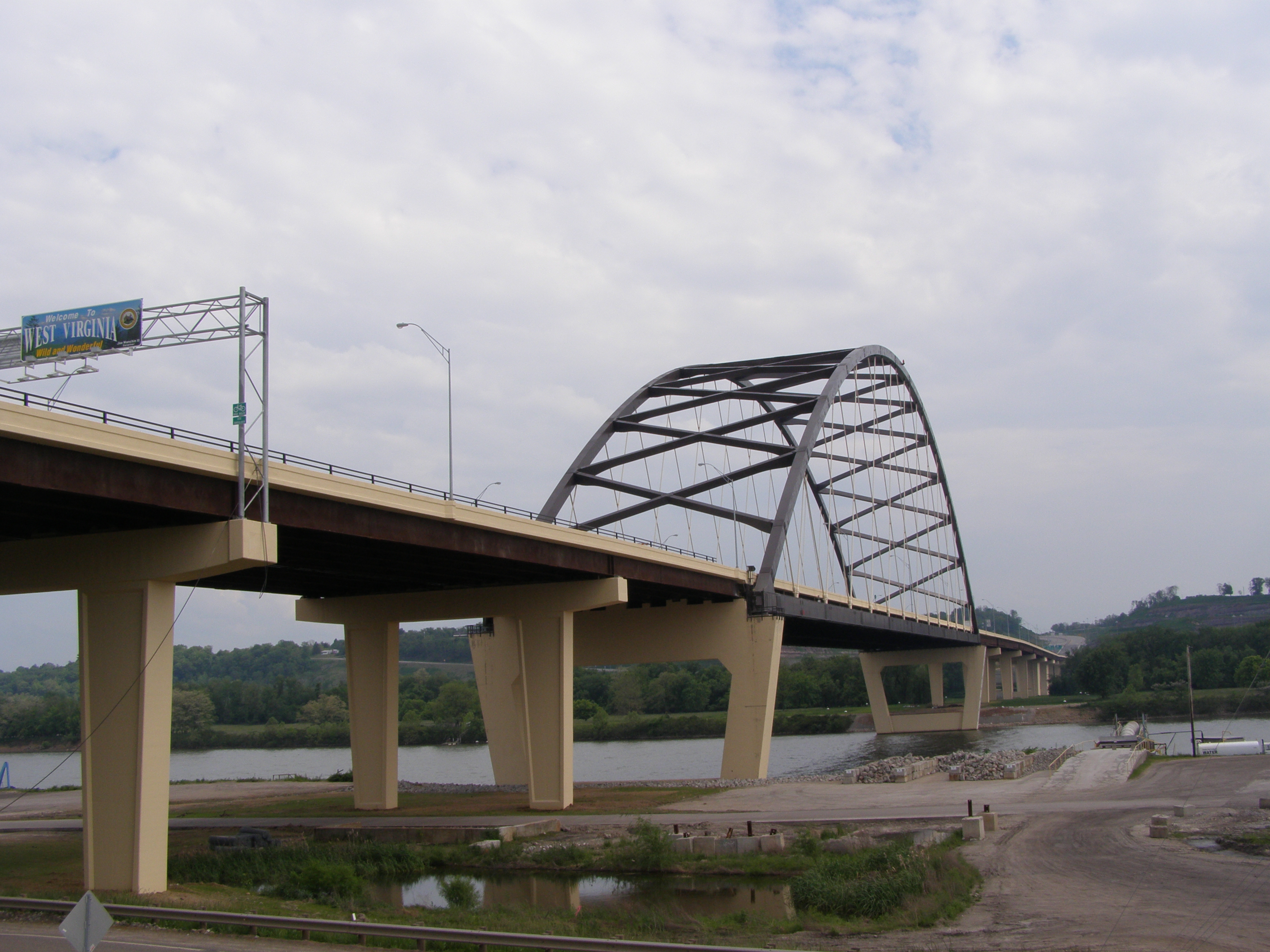

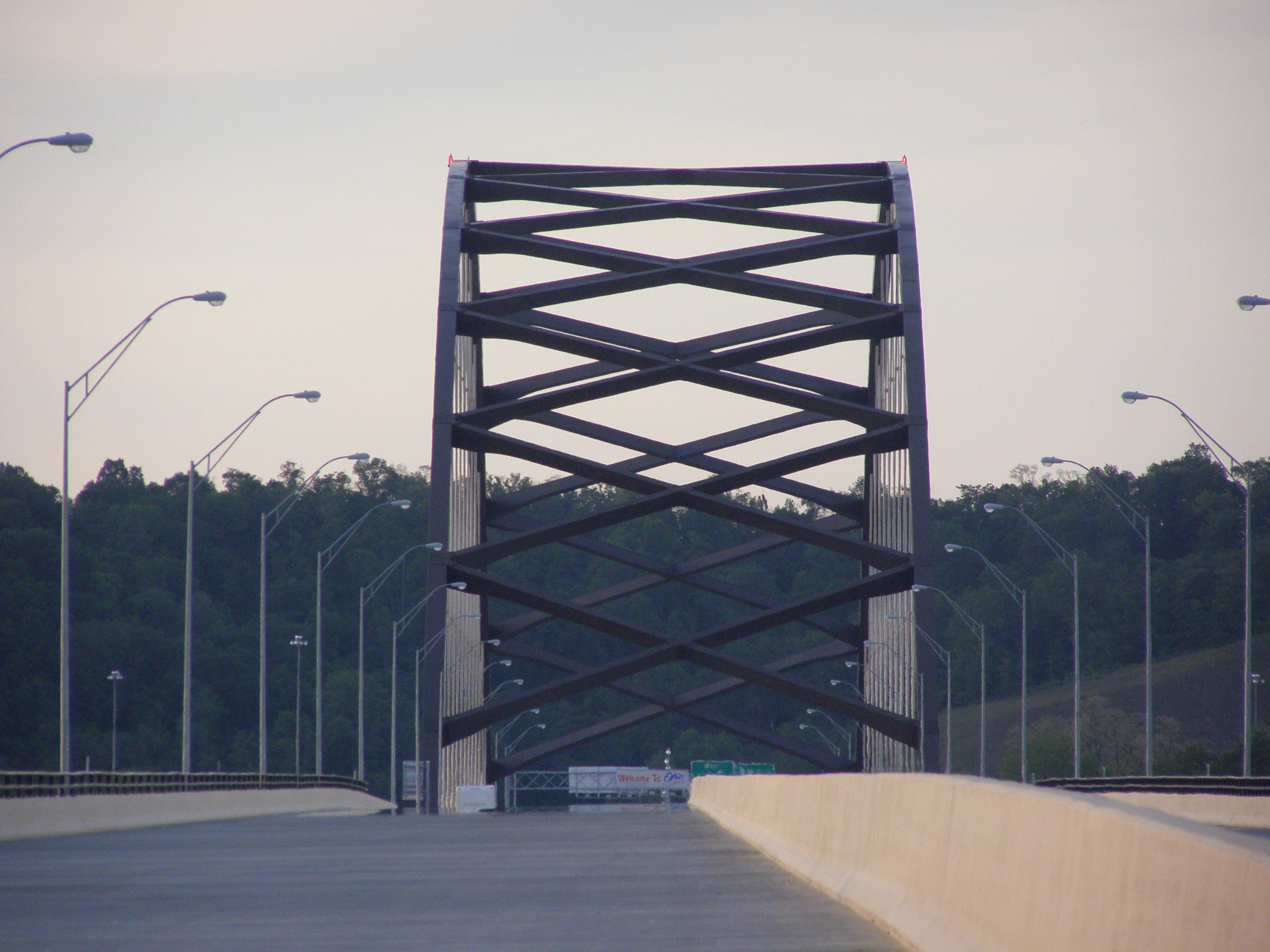

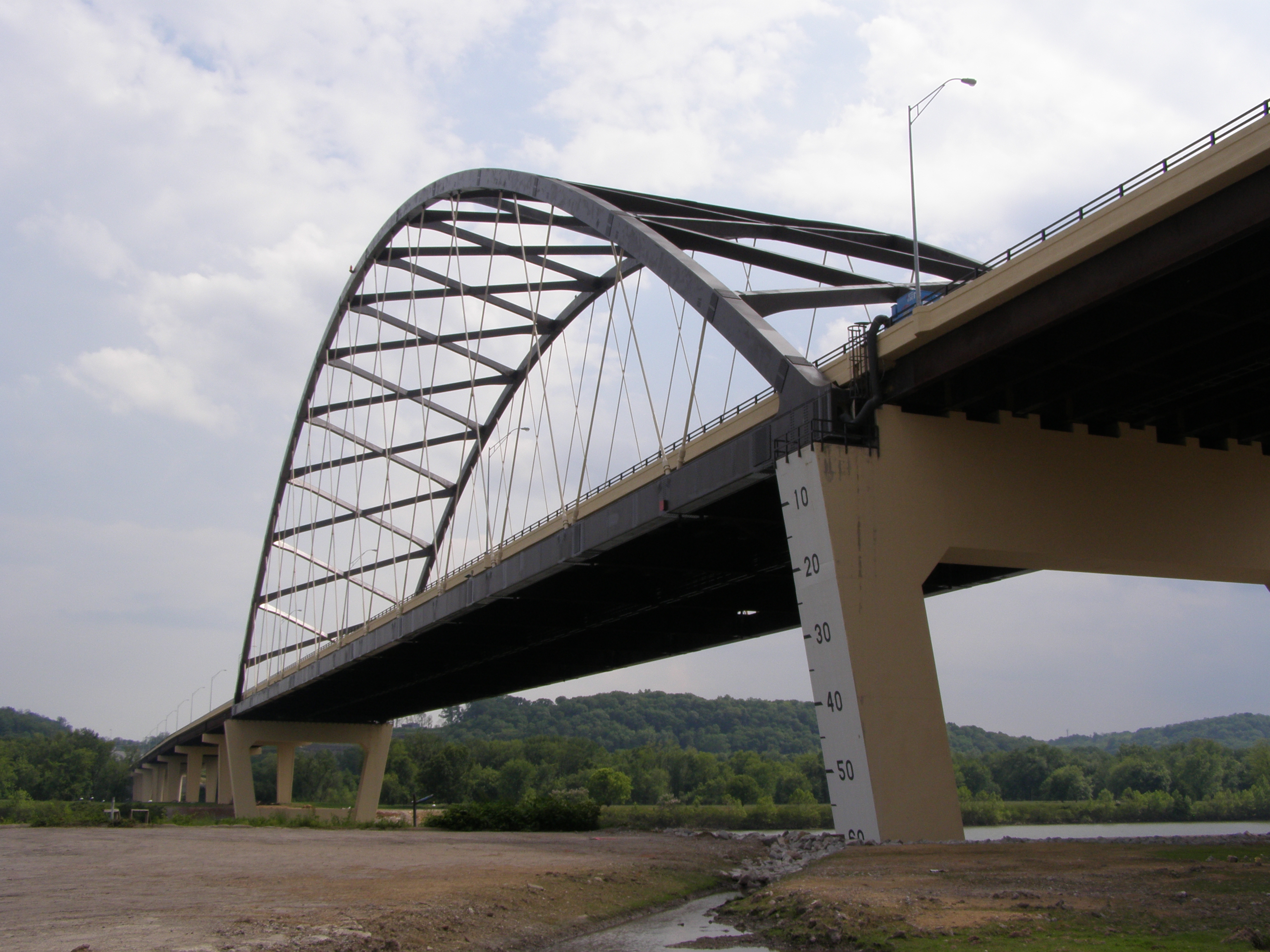

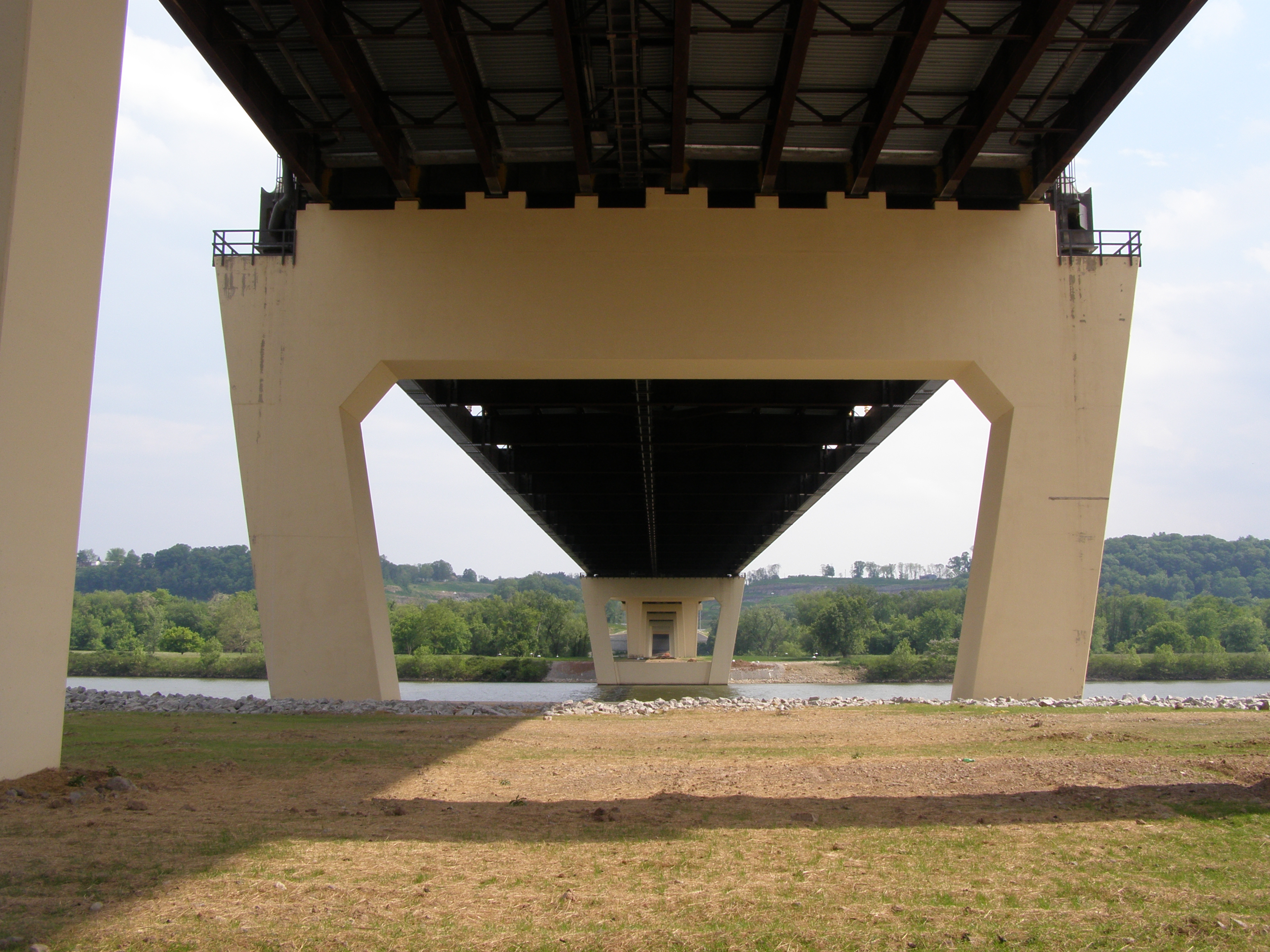

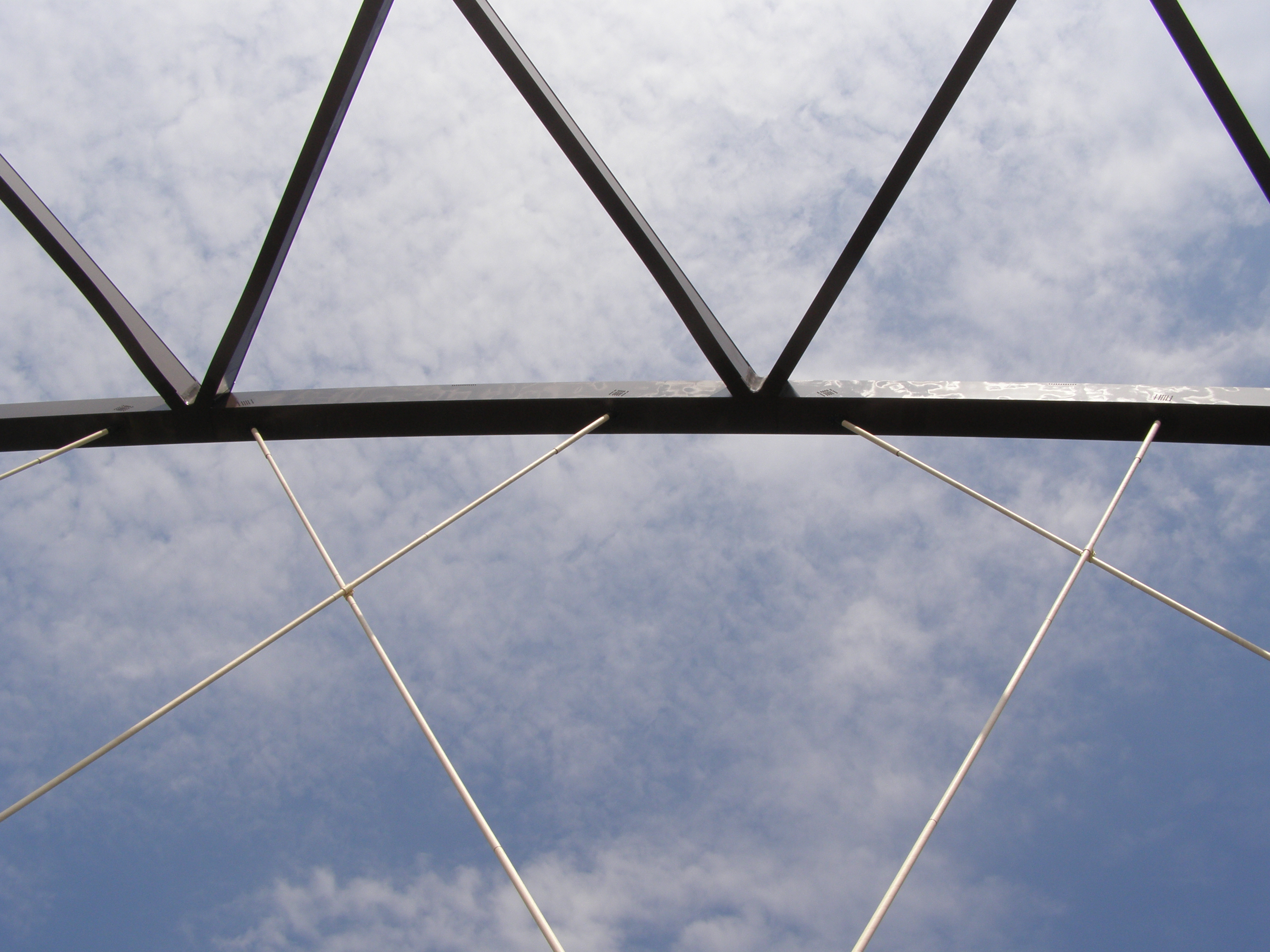
