= Murphytown, West Virginia =

- Unincorporated community
- Location within the state of West Virginia Murphytown, West Virginia (the United States)
- Coordinates: 39°14′2″N 81°26′36″W
- Country: United States
- State: West Virginia
- County: West Virginia
- Elevation: 650 ft (200 m)
- Time zone: UTC-5 (Eastern (EST))
  - Summer (DST): UTC-4 (EDT)
- ZIP codes: 26142
- Area code: 304
- GNIS ID: 1544015

Murphytown is an unincorporated community in Wood County, West Virginia, United States.
