= Parkersburg, West Virginia =

City in West Virginia, US

- City
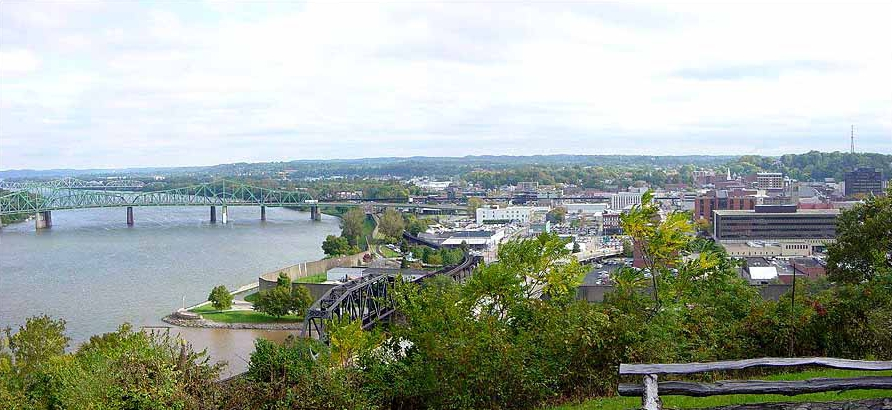
- Downtown Parkersburg as viewed from Fort Boreman Historical Park in 2006

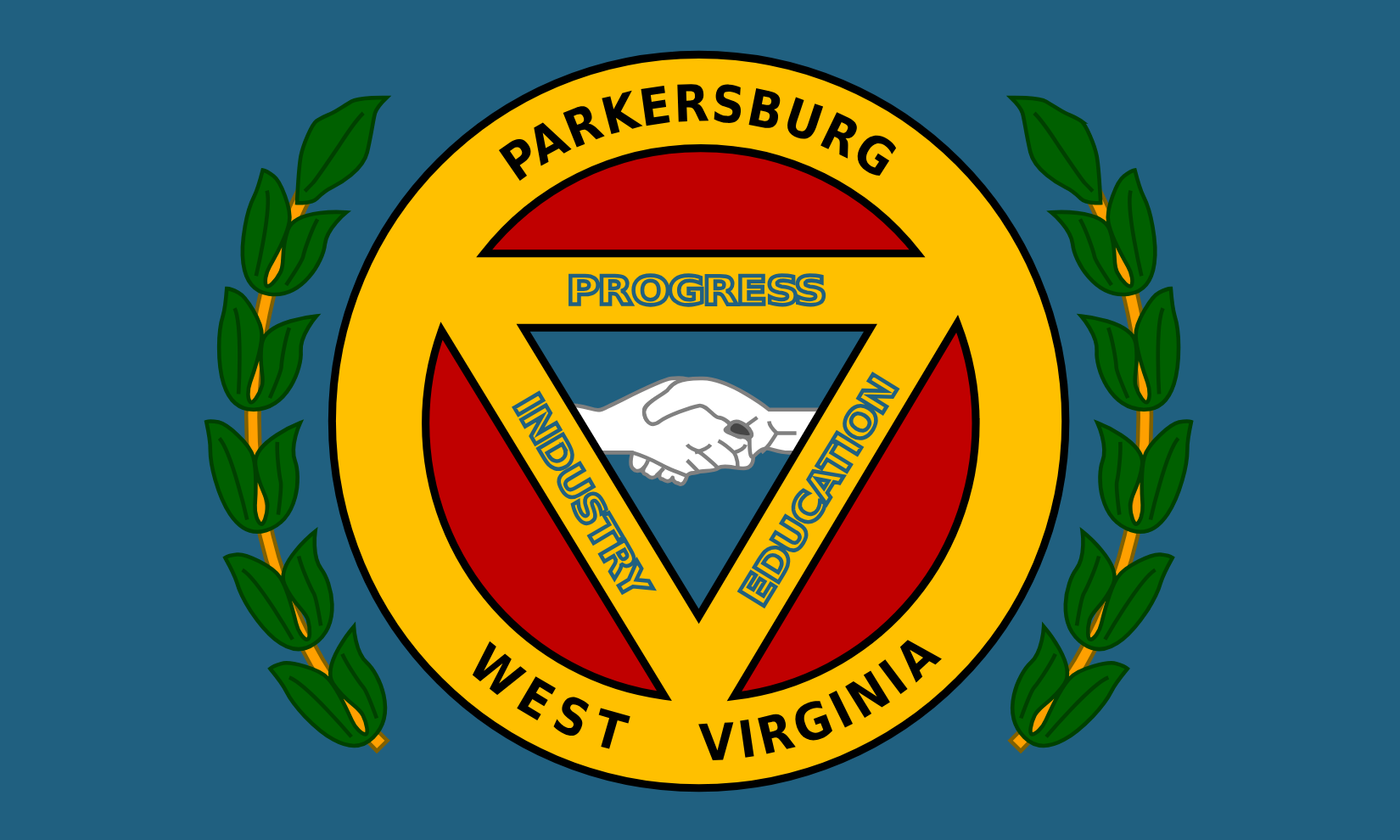
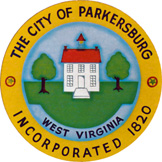
- Flag Seal
- Motto: Where West Virginia Began
- Interactive map of Parkersburg, West Virginia
- Location within West Virginia Location within the United States
- Coordinates: 39°15′58″N 81°32′32″W
- Country: United States
- State: West Virginia
- County: Wood
- Incorporated: 1810; 216 years ago

Government
  - Mayor: Tom Joyce (R)

Area
  - City: 12.33 sq mi (31.94 km^{2})
  - Land: 11.78 sq mi (30.52 km^{2})
  - Water: 0.55 sq mi (1.43 km^{2}) 4.29%
- Elevation: 633 ft (193 m)

Population (2020)
  - City: 29,738
  - Estimate (2021): 29,403
  - Density: 2,500/sq mi (960/km^{2})
  - Metro: 92,082 (US: 365th)
- Time zone: UTC−5 (EST)
  - Summer (DST): UTC−4 (EDT)
- ZIP codes: 26101, 26102, 26103, 26104, 26105, 26106
- Area codes: 304, 681
- FIPS code: 54-62140
- GNIS feature ID: 2390632
- Website: parkersburgwv.gov

Parkersburg is a city in Wood County, West Virginia, United States, and its county seat. Located at the confluence of the Ohio and Little Kanawha rivers, it is the state's fourth-most populous city and the center of the Parkersburg–Vienna metropolitan area. The city's population was 29,738 at the 2020 census, and its metro population was 89,490.

== History ==
Settlers at first named the city Newport when they settled it in the late 18th century following the American Revolutionary War. A town section was laid out on land granted to Alexander Parker for his Revolutionary War service. Virginia made grants of land to veterans for their war service. The title conflicts between Parker and the city planners of Newport were settled in 1809 in favor of his heirs. The town was renamed Parkersburg in 1810. It was chartered by the Virginia General Assembly in 1820. It was rechartered as a city in 1860.

The town was the western terminus of both the Staunton-Parkersburg Turnpike and the Northwestern Turnpike. In 1857, the Baltimore and Ohio Railroad built a branch line south to the town from Wheeling, West Virginia. Travelers wanting to connect with the Ohio Marietta and Cincinnati Railroad, one of the east–west lines along the Ohio River, had to take a steamboat 14 miles north to Marietta, Ohio. Jacob Linville designed the railroad bridge planned by the B&O. It was constructed in 1868–1870 between Parkersburg and Belpre, Ohio, as part of the B&O's main line from Baltimore to St. Louis, Missouri. This drew traffic and trade from Marietta. Today the structure is known as the Parkersburg Bridge.

Parkersburg served as a transportation and medical center for Union forces during the American Civil War. It developed further as a transportation hub in the gas and oil boom following that war.

In the late 19th century, Parkersburg emerged as a major oil refining center serving nearby oilfields at Volcano and Burning Springs. The Camden Consolidated Oil Company, founded in 1866 by future U.S. Senator Johnson Newlon Camden, dominated the refining business and was sold to Rockefeller's Standard Oil Company in 1875. Camden became a Standard director and vice president and, along with John W. Davis, dominated West Virginia politics until the early 20th century.

In the post-World War II period, Parkersburg became one of the leading industrial centers of the Ohio Valley, producing chemicals, glass, O. Ames tools, textiles (especially American Viscose Corporation rayon), plastics and polymers, iron, and steel.

The Bureau of the Public Debt, an agency of the U.S. Treasury Department, was moved to Parkersburg in 1954 as a location midway between Chicago and Washington, D.C. that would be safe in the event of a national emergency. In October 2012, the Bureau of the Public Debt consolidated with the Financial Management Service to form the Bureau of the Fiscal Service.

== Geography ==
According to the United States Census Bureau, the city has a total area of 12.35 square miles (31.99 km^{2}), of which 11.82 square miles (30.61 km^{2}) is land and 0.53 square miles (1.37 km^{2}) is water.

The city is situated at the confluence of the Little Kanawha and Ohio rivers. The Little Kanawha River divides the north and south sides of the city. Worthington Creek, a tributary of the Little Kanawha River, flows through the eastern part of the city.

=== Neighborhoods ===
The North End of the city includes the Beechwood, Downtown, Fairview Heights, Granada Hills, Julia-Ann Square, Meadowcrest, Oakwood Estates, Quincy Hill, Riverside, Woodland Park, North End, Worthington, and East End neighborhoods.

The southern part of the City of Parkersburg, South Parkersburg was a separate city until it became part of Parkersburg in 1950. Suburban parts of southern Wood County include Blennerhassett, Lubeck, and Washington to the southwest, with Mineral Wells located to the southeast.

=== Climate ===
The climate in this area is characterized by hot, humid summers, cold winters and evenly distributed precipitation throughout the year. According to the Köppen Climate Classification system, Parkersburg is in transition between a humid continental climate, abbreviated Dfa on climate maps, and humid subtropical (Cfa).

Climate data for Parkersburg Airport, West Virginia (1991–2020 normals, (Note: Mean monthly maxima and minima (i.e. the expected highest and lowest temperature readings at any point during the year or given month) calculated based on data at said location from 1991 to 2020.) extremes 1926–present)
Month	Jan	Feb	Mar	Apr	May	Jun	Jul	Aug	Sep	Oct	Nov	Dec	Year
Record high °F (°C)	78 (26)	79 (26)	89 (32)	91 (33)	95 (35)	100 (38)	104 (40)	102 (39)	102 (39)	96 (36)	86 (30)	78 (26)	104 (40)
Mean maximum °F (°C)	65 (18)	67 (19)	76 (24)	84 (29)	88 (31)	91 (33)	93 (34)	93 (34)	90 (32)	83 (28)	75 (24)	66 (19)	94 (34)
Mean daily maximum °F (°C)	40.2 (4.6)	44.4 (6.9)	54.2 (12.3)	66.9 (19.4)	74.9 (23.8)	82.1 (27.8)	85.3 (29.6)	84.7 (29.3)	78.5 (25.8)	66.8 (19.3)	54.8 (12.7)	44.4 (6.9)	64.8 (18.2)
Daily mean °F (°C)	32.0 (0.0)	35.0 (1.7)	43.6 (6.4)	54.6 (12.6)	63.3 (17.4)	71.0 (21.7)	74.7 (23.7)	73.5 (23.1)	66.9 (19.4)	55.4 (13.0)	44.7 (7.1)	36.3 (2.4)	54.2 (12.3)
Mean daily minimum °F (°C)	23.7 (−4.6)	25.7 (−3.5)	32.9 (0.5)	42.4 (5.8)	51.6 (10.9)	59.9 (15.5)	64.1 (17.8)	62.4 (16.9)	55.2 (12.9)	43.9 (6.6)	34.6 (1.4)	28.3 (−2.1)	43.7 (6.5)
Mean minimum °F (°C)	2 (−17)	5 (−15)	14 (−10)	26 (−3)	34 (1)	47 (8)	54 (12)	52 (11)	41 (5)	29 (−2)	19 (−7)	10 (−12)	−1 (−18)
Record low °F (°C)	−24 (−31)	−10 (−23)	−3 (−19)	18 (−8)	28 (−2)	36 (2)	44 (7)	40 (4)	32 (0)	21 (−6)	4 (−16)	−16 (−27)	−24 (−31)
Average precipitation inches (mm)	3.27 (83)	3.11 (79)	3.67 (93)	3.62 (92)	4.17 (106)	4.44 (113)	4.45 (113)	3.38 (86)	3.18 (81)	2.98 (76)	2.88 (73)	3.36 (85)	42.51 (1,080)
Average snowfall inches (cm)	7.9 (20)	5.5 (14)	4.2 (11)	0.9 (2.3)	0.0 (0.0)	0.0 (0.0)	0.0 (0.0)	0.0 (0.0)	0.0 (0.0)	0.0 (0.0)	0.8 (2.0)	2.8 (7.1)	22.1 (56)
Average precipitation days (≥ 0.01 in)	14.5	12.2	13.4	13.2	13.2	11.4	12.1	9.8	8.8	11.5	10.7	13.2	144.0
Average snowy days (≥ 0.1 in)	6.7	4.9	2.8	0.5	0.0	0.0	0.0	0.0	0.0	0.1	1.1	4.3	20.4
Mean monthly sunshine hours	115.5	131.0	182.3	208.1	248.0	257.3	255.0	245.2	212.5	193.9	117.1	93.4	2,259.3
Percentage possible sunshine	38	44	49	52	56	58	56	58	57	56	39	32	51
Source: NOAA (snow 1981–2010, sun 1961–1990)

== Demographics ==
Historical population
Census	Pop.	Note	%±
1850	1,218		—
1860	2,493		104.7%
1870	5,546		122.5%
1880	6,582		18.7%
1890	8,408		27.7%
1900	11,703		39.2%
1910	17,842		52.5%
1920	20,050		12.4%
1930	29,623		47.7%
1940	30,103		1.6%
1950	29,684		−1.4%
1960	44,797		50.9%
1970	44,208		−1.3%
1980	39,946		−9.6%
1990	33,862		−15.2%
2000	33,099		−2.3%
2010	31,492		−4.9%
2020	29,738		−5.6%
U.S. Decennial Census

=== 2020 census ===
As of the census of 2020, there were 29,738 people, 13,119 households, and 7,305 families residing in the city. The population density was 2,524 inhabitants per square mile (1,029/km2). There were 15,246 housing units at an average density of 1,317 per square mile (508/km2). The racial makeup of the city was 93.8% White, 1.9% African American, 0.1% Native American, 0.9% Asian, 0.3% Pacific Islander, 0.3% from other races, and 3.1% from two or more races. Hispanic or Latino of any race were 1.5% of the population.

There were 13,119 households, of which 24.9% had children under the age of 18 living with them, 34.5% were married couples living together, 13.5% had a female householder with no husband present, 5.7% had a male householder with no wife present, and 44.3% were non-families. 35.0% of all households were made up of individuals, and 16% had someone living alone who was 65 years of age or older. The average household size was 2.20 and the average family size was 2.96.

The median age in the city was 42 years. 20.5% of residents were under the age of 18; 6.2% were between the ages of 18 and 24; 24.7% were from 25 to 44; 27% were from 45 to 64; and 21.6% were 65 years of age or older. The gender makeup of the city was 48.3% male and 51.7% female.

=== 2010 census ===
As of the census of 2010, there were 31,492 people, 13,807 households, and 8,086 families residing in the city. The population density was 2,664 inhabitants per square mile (1,028.6/km^{2}). There were 15,562 housing units at an average density of 1,317 per square mile (508.5/km^{2}). The racial makeup of the city was 94.9% White, 2.0% African American, 0.3% Native American, 0.4% Asian, 0.1% Pacific Islander, 0.3% from other races, and 2.1% from two or more races. Hispanic or Latino of any race were 1.2% of the population.

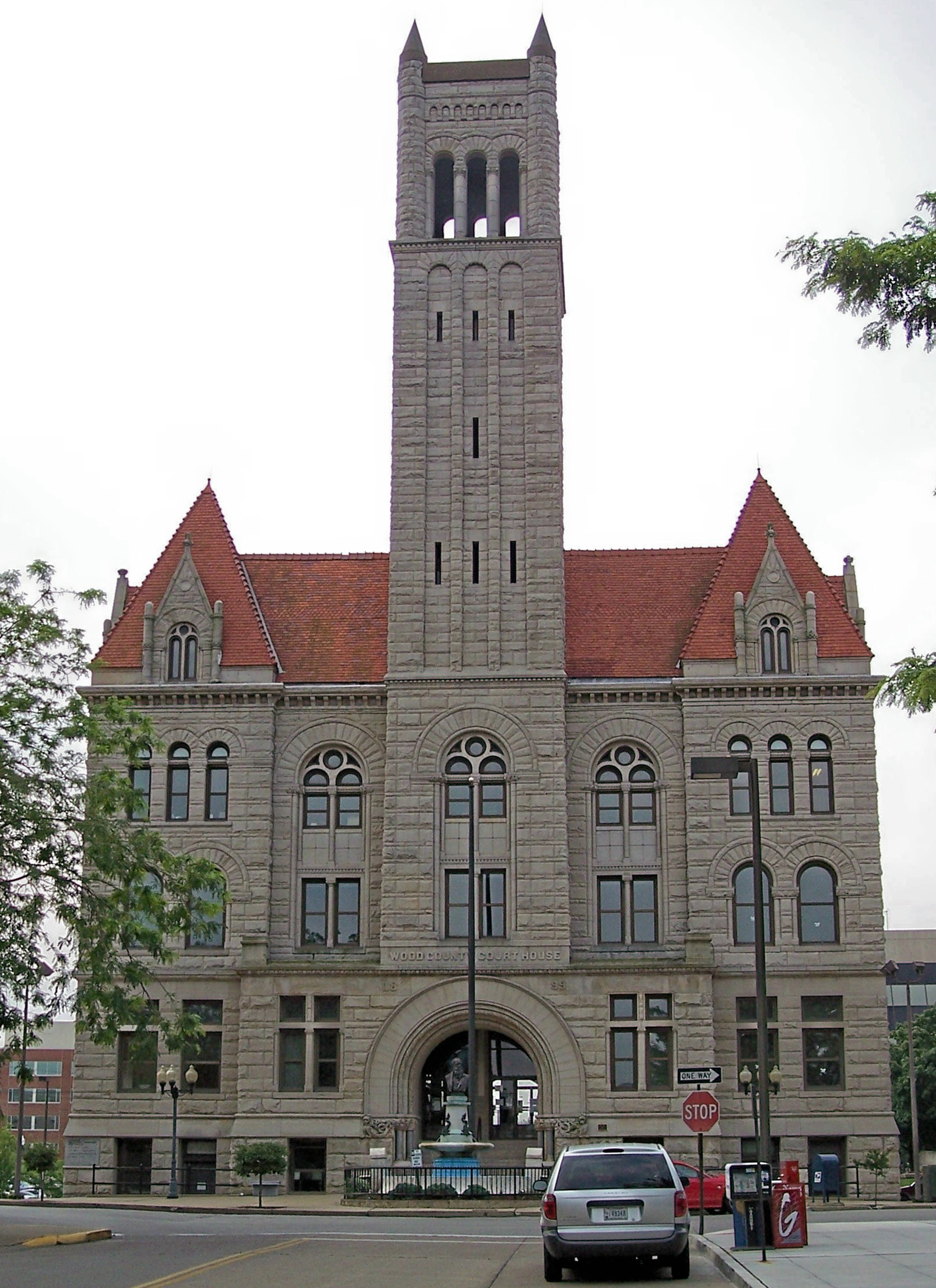
Wood County Courthouse

There were 13,807 households, of which 27.0% had children under the age of 18 living with them, 39.1% were married couples living together, 14.3% had a female householder with no husband present, 5.1% had a male householder with no wife present, and 41.4% were non-families. 35.0% of all households were made up of individuals, and 14.3% had someone living alone who was 65 years of age or older. The average household size was 2.24 and the average family size was 2.86.

The median age in the city was 41.2 years. 21.3% of residents were under the age of 18; 8.2% were between the ages of 18 and 24; 25% were from 25 to 44; 27.5% were from 45 to 64; and 18% were 65 years of age or older. The gender makeup of the city was 47.5% male and 52.5% female.

=== 2000 census ===
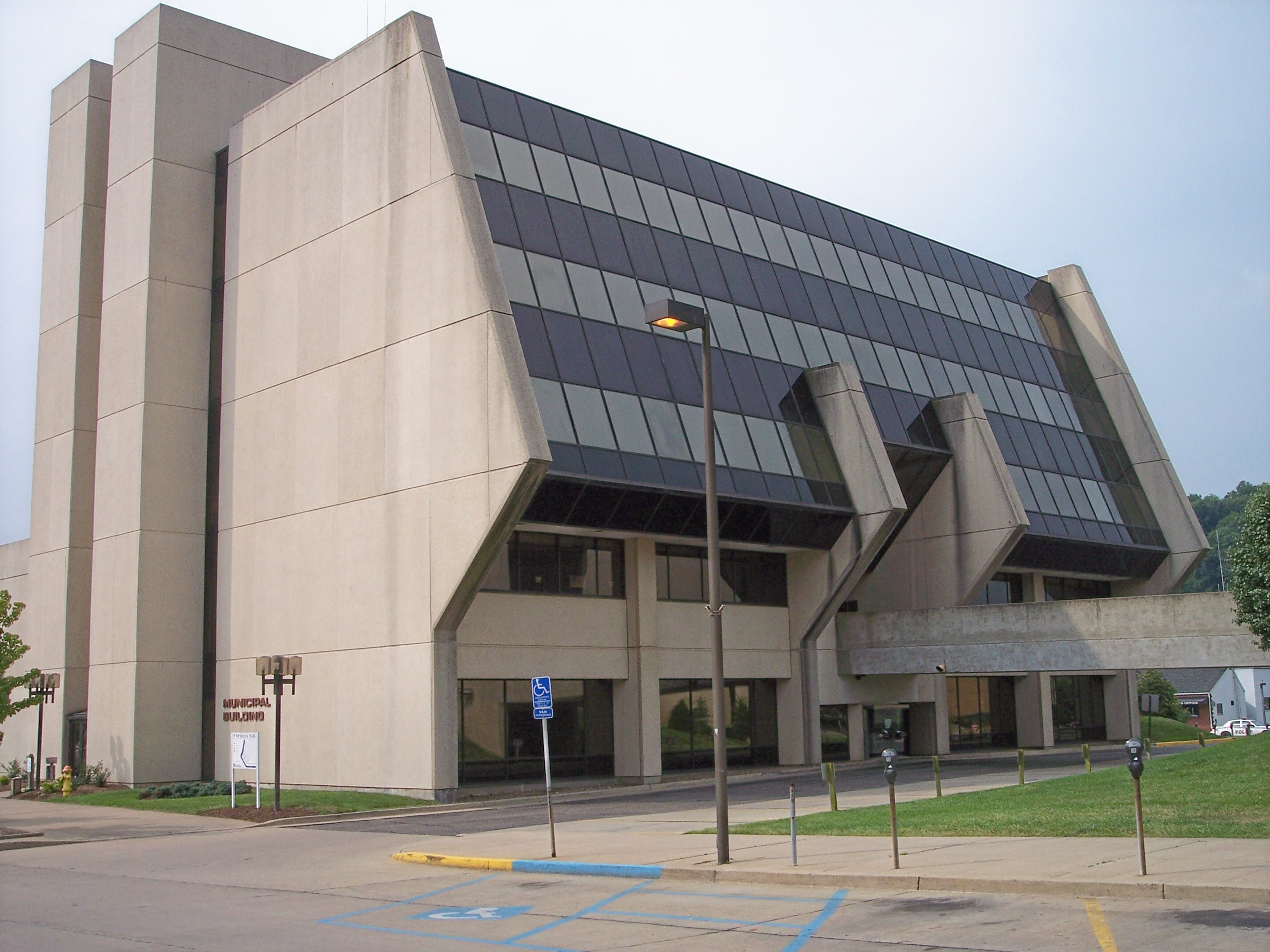
Parkersburg Municipal Building

As of the census of 2000, there were 33,099 people, 14,467 households, and 8,767 families residing in the city. In 2012 the U.S. Census Bureau estimated that Parkersburg's population had decreased 0.5% to 31,261. The population density was 2,800.5 inhabitants per square mile (1,081.3/km^{2}). There were 16,100 housing units at an average density of 1,362.2 per square mile (525.9/km^{2}). The racial makeup of the city was 96.4% White, 1.8% African American, 0.4% Native American, 0.2% Asian, 0.1% Pacific Islander, 0.2% from other races, and 1.0% from two or more races. Hispanic or Latino of any race were 0.8% of the population. There were 14,467 households, out of which 25.0% had children under the age of 18 living with them, 43.2% were married couples living together, 13.5% had a female householder with no husband present, and 39.4% were non-families. 34.0% of all households were made up of individuals, and 15.1% had someone living alone who was 65 years of age or older. The average household size was 2.23 and the average family size was 2.83.

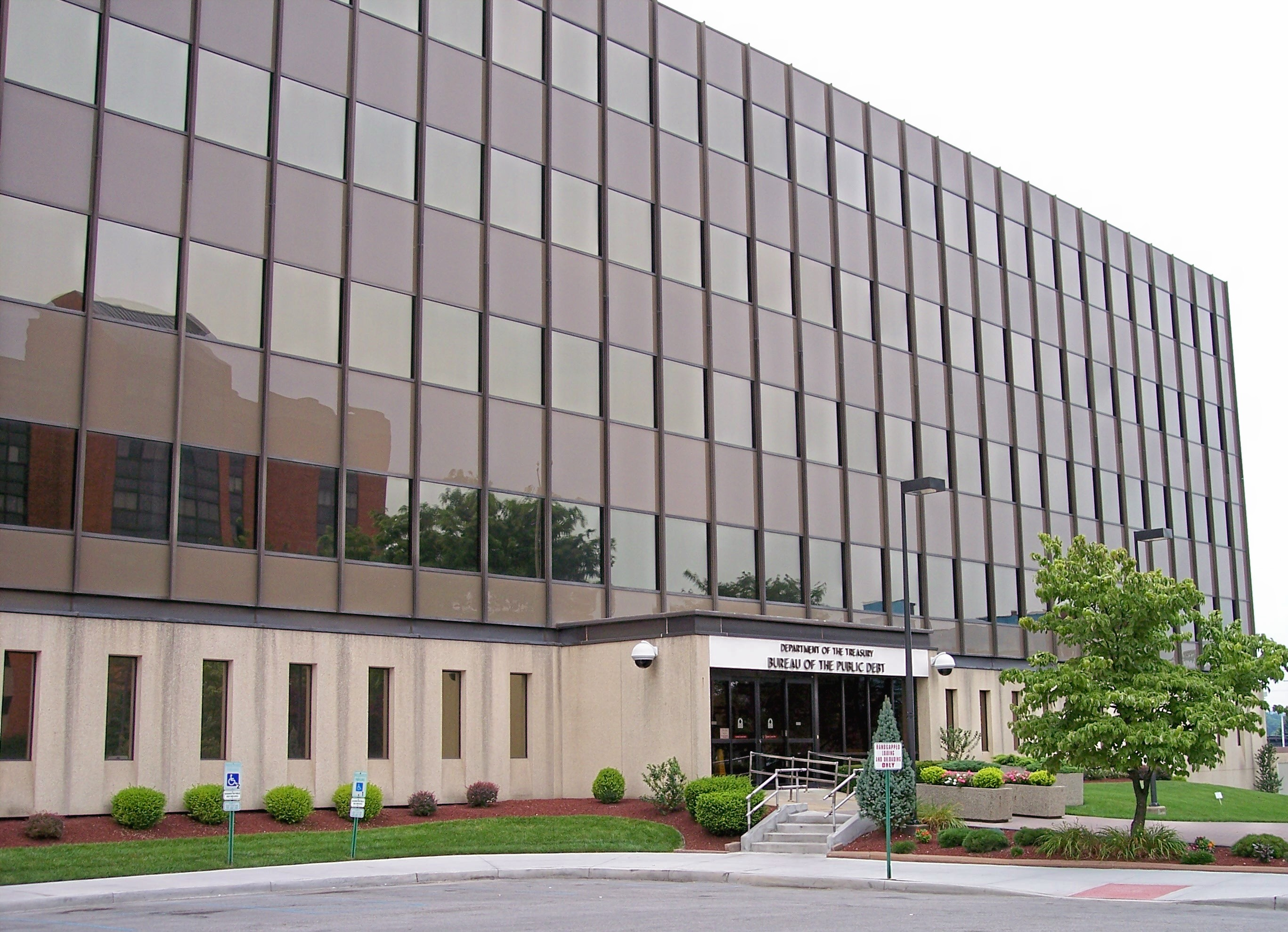
Bureau of the Fiscal Service office

In the city the population was spread out, with 21.2% under the age of 18, 9.1% from 18 to 24, 27.1% from 25 to 44, 23.7% from 45 to 64, and 18.9% who were 65 years of age or older. The median age was 40 years. For every 100 females, there were 87.6 males. For every 100 females age 18 and over, there were 83.9 males.

The median income for a household in the city was $21,120, and the median income for a family was $29,731. Males had a median income of $28,320 versus $18,203 for females. The per capita income for the city was $15,820. About 23.3% of families and 21.2% of the population were below the poverty line, including 35.2% of those under the age of 18 and 12.5% of those 65 and older.

== Arts and culture ==
The Chancellor House in the Julia-Ann Square Historic District

=== Tourism ===
Several museums are located in Parkersburg, including the Blennerhassett Museum of Regional History, the Henry Cooper House, the Oil and Gas Museum, the Sumnerite African-American History Museum, the Artcraft Studio and the Veterans Museum of Mid-Ohio Valley.

== Parks and recreation ==
There are several parks in the area, including Blennerhassett Island Historical State Park, Bicentennial Park, Corning Park, Point Park, Southwood Park, Quincy Park, City Park, Johnson T. Janes Park, Friendship Park, Fort Boreman Historical Park, Mountwood Park and Fries Park.

== Sports ==
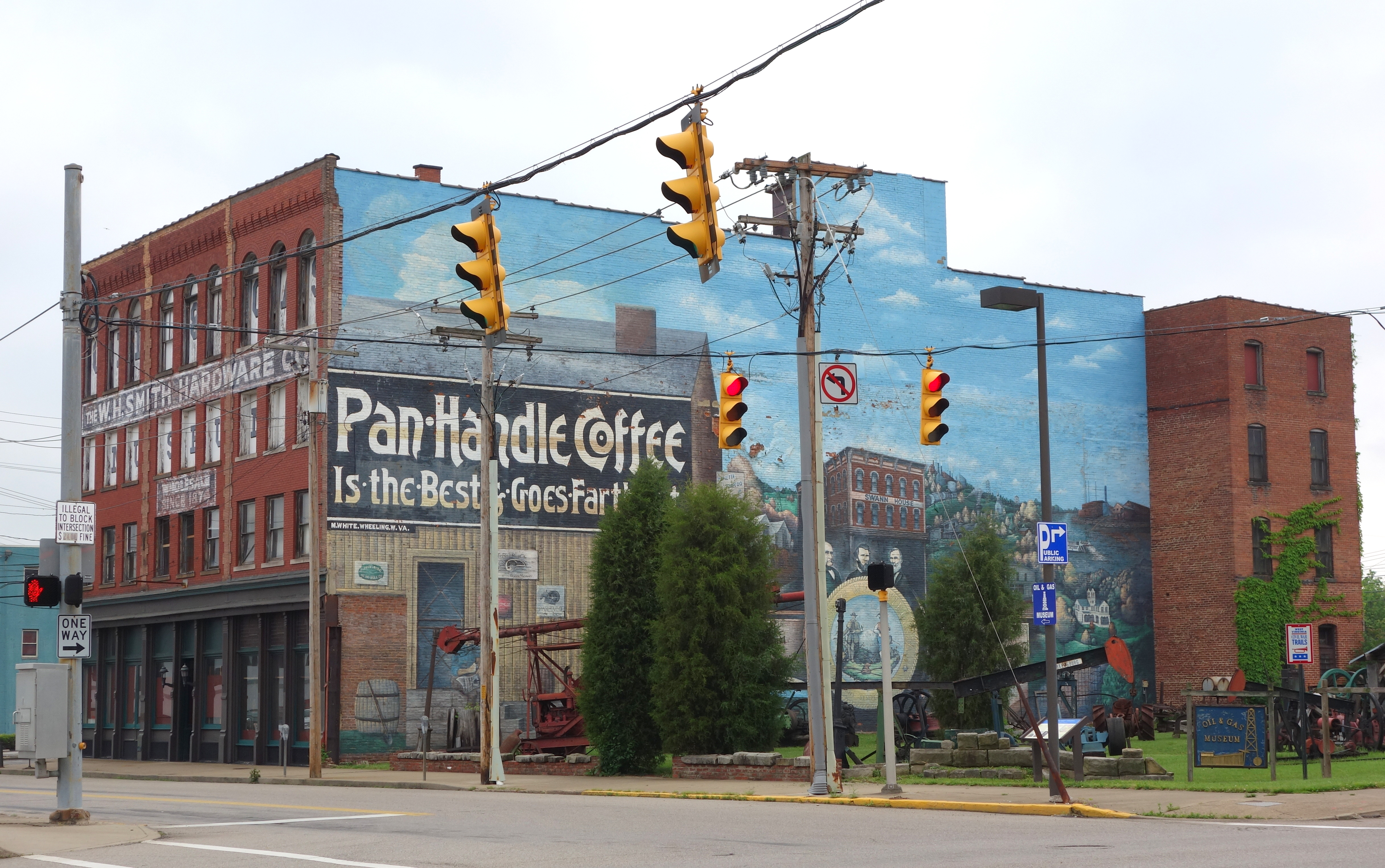
The Oil & Gas Museum is located in the W.H. Smith Hardware Company Building, built in 1899

The Wood County Ravens, a semi-professional football team, was based in the city. The Ravens were a part of the now defunct Mountain State Football League.

Parkersburg was home to the Ohio Valley Redcoats, a minor league baseball team, from 1993 through 1998. The city negotiated to bring professional baseball back to Parkersburg but they fell through because of lack of support from the community.

In 2008, the city and its three high schools placed second in ESPN's TitleTown USA competition. By 2008, the city's high school athletic programs had amassed 192 overall state championships.

== Government ==
For more than 50 years, Parkersburg has operated under the strong-mayor form of government, with an elected chief executive and a city council with legislative and budget-setting authority. The mayor can veto legislation approved by council, which can override a veto with a two-thirds majority vote. Council sets the budget and appropriates funds.

Prior to 1970, a five-member board, consisting of a mayor and four at-large councilmen, managed the city under the commission form whereas each commissioner ran a department of the city. Under that format, the mayor was in charge of police and other areas, while councilmen got their choice of which department i.e. water works and sewage, finance, streets and public works and public safety, based on who got the most votes in the election.

== Education ==
=== Higher education ===
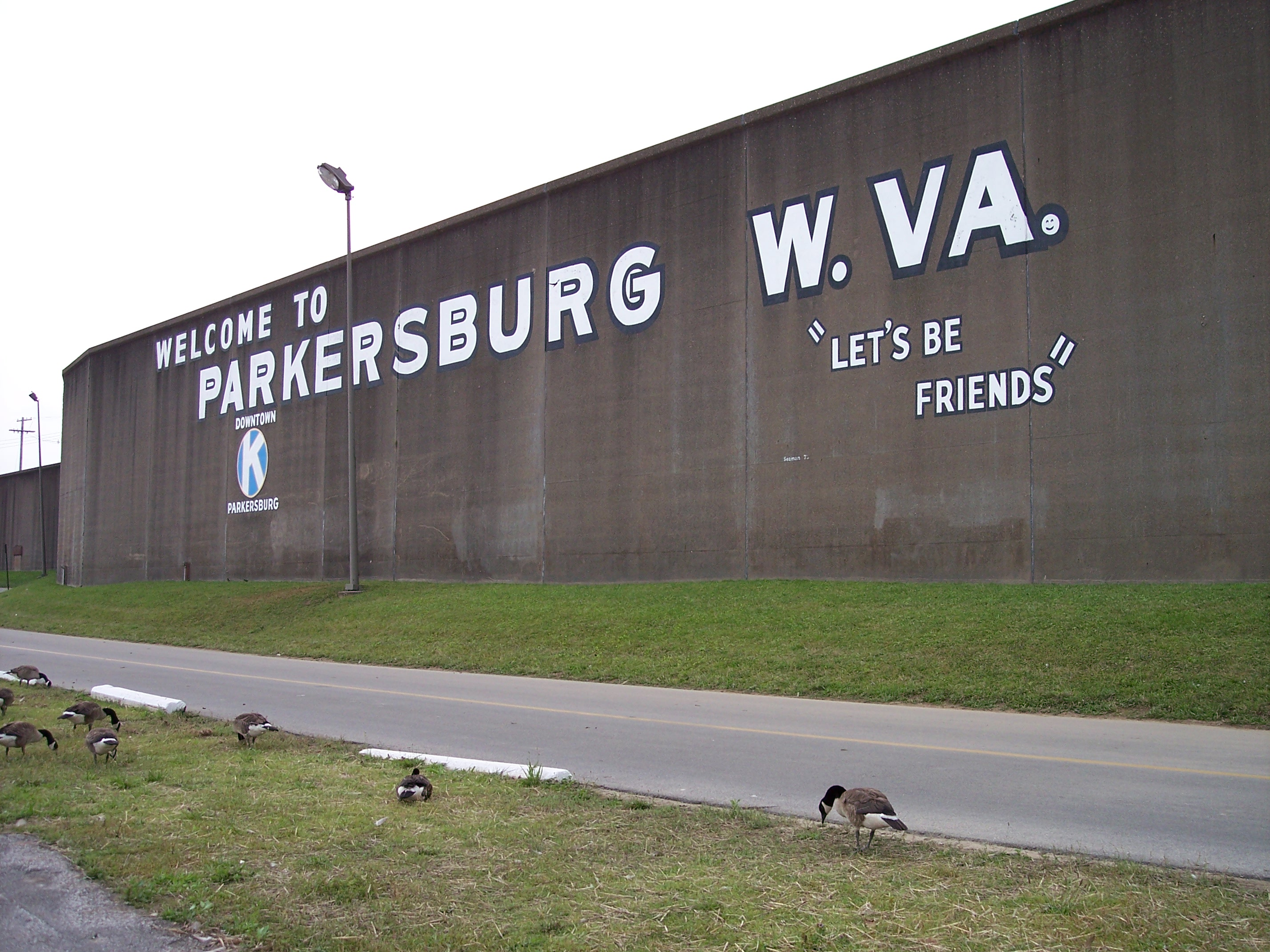
Parkersburg floodwall

- West Virginia University at Parkersburg, a public college, is located on the outskirts of the city.
- Parkersburg Bible College, a private Christian school
- Centurion Bible College

=== Primary and secondary ===
Parkersburg is the home of the Parkersburg High School Big Reds, Parkersburg South High School Patriots, and the Parkersburg Catholic High School Crusaders. The Wood County Technical Center and the Caperton Center for Applied Technology is part of Wood County Schools. There were, as of May 2020, five middle schools and 16 elementary schools dispersed throughout the city.

== Media ==
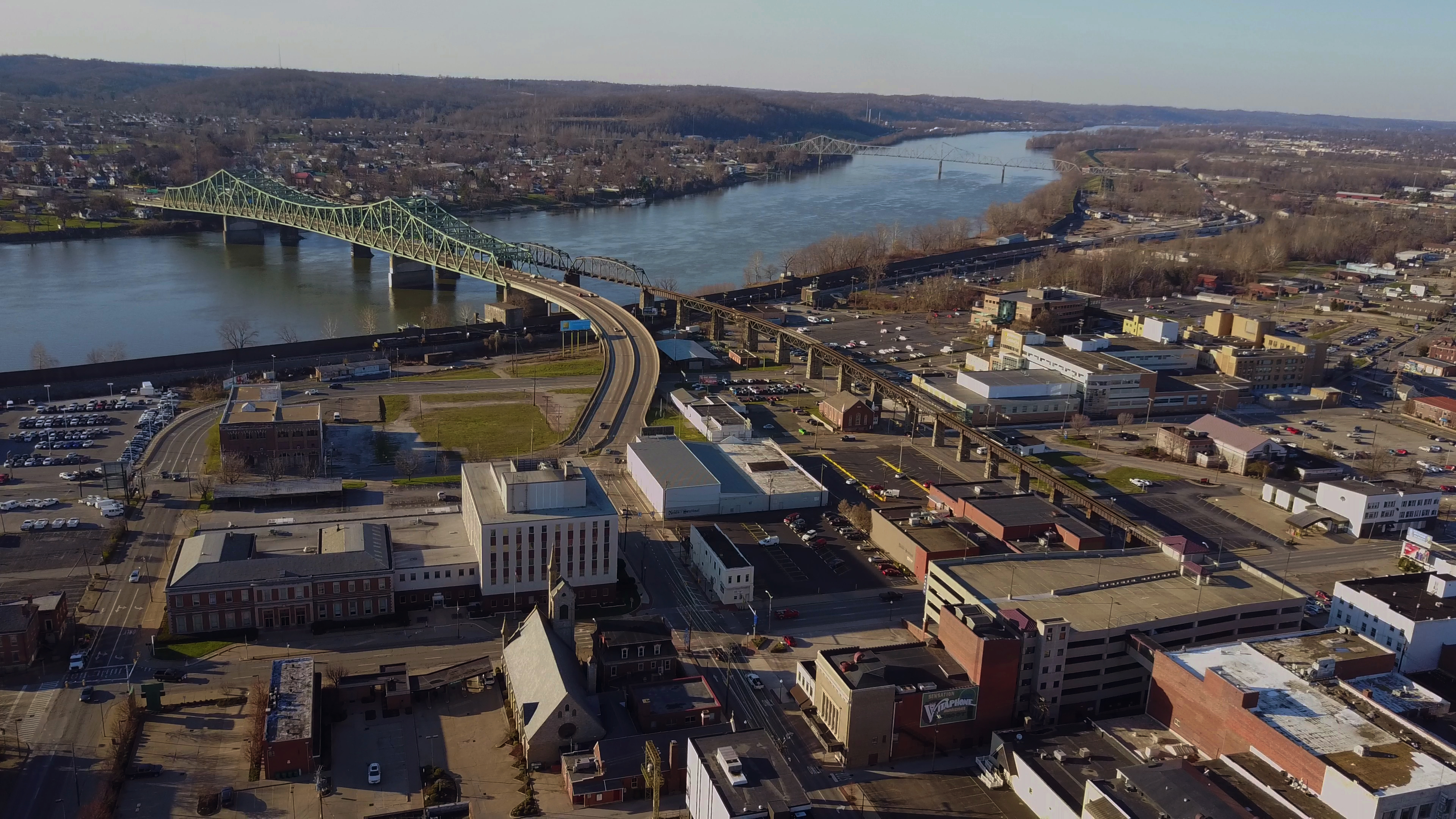
Aerial view of the Ohio River from Parkersburg

The Parkersburg News and Parkersburg Sentinel were the city's two major daily newspapers until they combined in 2009 to form one daily edition: The Parkersburg News and Sentinel. The same company also publishes The Marietta Times and West Virginia's alternative news magazine,Graffiti

There are many radio stations broadcasting from Parkersburg, including 106.1 Z106 (WRZZ),102.1 The River (WRVB), U.S. 107 WNUS, MIX 100 (WDMX), V96.9 (WVVV), WXIL, Froggy 99.1, 103.1 The Bear, and WPKM 96.3 FM "the Beat" which is the college radio station of West Virginia University at Parkersburg.

WTAP, the local NBC affiliate, is the main local television station. WIYE-LD (CBS) and WOVA-LD (Fox / CW+) are sister stations.

== Transportation ==
Parkersburg is served by two major highways, Interstate 77 and US 50. Other routes through the city include WV routes 2, 14, 47, 68, 95 and 618.

Parkersburg is served by Mid-Ohio Valley Regional Airport, with three flights a day Monday through Friday from Charlotte Douglas International Airport.

Passenger rail was available into the 1960s, with several major long-distance trains making stops in Parkersburg. These included the Baltimore and Ohio's National Limited to St. Louis to the west and Washington, D.C., Baltimore and Jersey City to the east. From 1976 to 1981 Amtrak operated the Shenandoah, serving Cincinnati to the west and Washington, D.C., to the east.

Freight rail service is provided by CSX, with local industries switched by Belpre Industrial Parkersburg Railroad and Little Kanawha River Rail.

== Pollution ==
High levels of PFOA, also known as C8, originating in landfills used by the DuPont/Chemours Washington Works chemical company have been noted in Parkersburg drinking water. Despite a 2004 class-action legal settlement obligating DuPont to install a drinking water filtration plant if asked, local water district officials have not, as of 2016, asked for one.

== In popular culture ==
- The Mark Ruffalo film Dark Waters, released in 2019, was based in events mainly from the City of Parkersburg.
- Other films shot in the city are Salvage and The Barbecue.
- Parkersburg was featured in a 2013 episode of the NBC post-apocalyptic science fiction television drama series Revolution.
- Emo/Post-Rock/Indie band The World Is a Beautiful Place & I Am No Longer Afraid to Die references the city in their song "Blank//Worker" from the 2021 album Illusory Walls.

== Sister city ==
- Parkersburg, Iowa

== See also ==
- Hughes River Wildlife Management Area
- List of cities and towns along the Ohio River
- List of Registered Historic Places in West Virginia
- Vienna, WV
- Grand Central Mall

== General sources ==
The West Virginia Encyclopedia. The WV Humanities Council. June 20, 2006. ISBN 9780977849802.
