= Washington, West Virginia =

- CDP
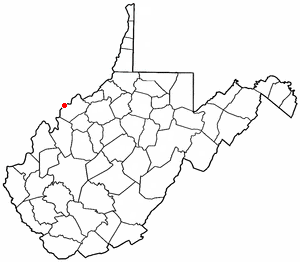
- Location of Washington, West Virginia
- Coordinates: 39°14′52″N 81°39′54″W
- Country: United States
- State: West Virginia
- County: Wood

Area
  - Total: 4.4 sq mi (11.3 km^{2})
  - Land: 4.2 sq mi (10.8 km^{2})
  - Water: 0.23 sq mi (0.6 km^{2})
- Elevation: 640 ft (200 m)

Population (2020)
  - Total: 1,151
  - Density: 276/sq mi (107/km^{2})
- Time zone: UTC-5 (Eastern (EST))
  - Summer (DST): UTC-4 (EDT)
- ZIP code: 26181
- Area code: 304
- FIPS code: 54-84724
- GNIS feature ID: 2390456

Washington is a census-designated place (CDP) in Wood County, West Virginia, United States, situated along the Ohio River. It is part of the Parkersburg-Marietta-Vienna, WV-OH Metropolitan Statistical Area. The population was 1,151 at the 2020 census. The community was named after George Washington.

The CDP is home to the Washington Works, one of the largest single facilities of chemicals manufacturing giant Chemours.

Also home to Sabic Plastics Washington Works (previously GE Plastics, acquired from Borg Warner Plastics, née Marbon), Kuraray Washington Works, Dupont Washington Works and a Linde air separation plant. Dupont polluted Washington with Perfluorooctanoic acid or PFOA, which it used to make Teflon.

== Geography ==
According to the United States Census Bureau, the CDP has a total area of 4.4 square miles (11.3 km^{2}), of which 4.2 square miles (10.8 km^{2}) is land and 0.2 square mile (0.6 km^{2}) (5.13%) is water.

== Demographics ==
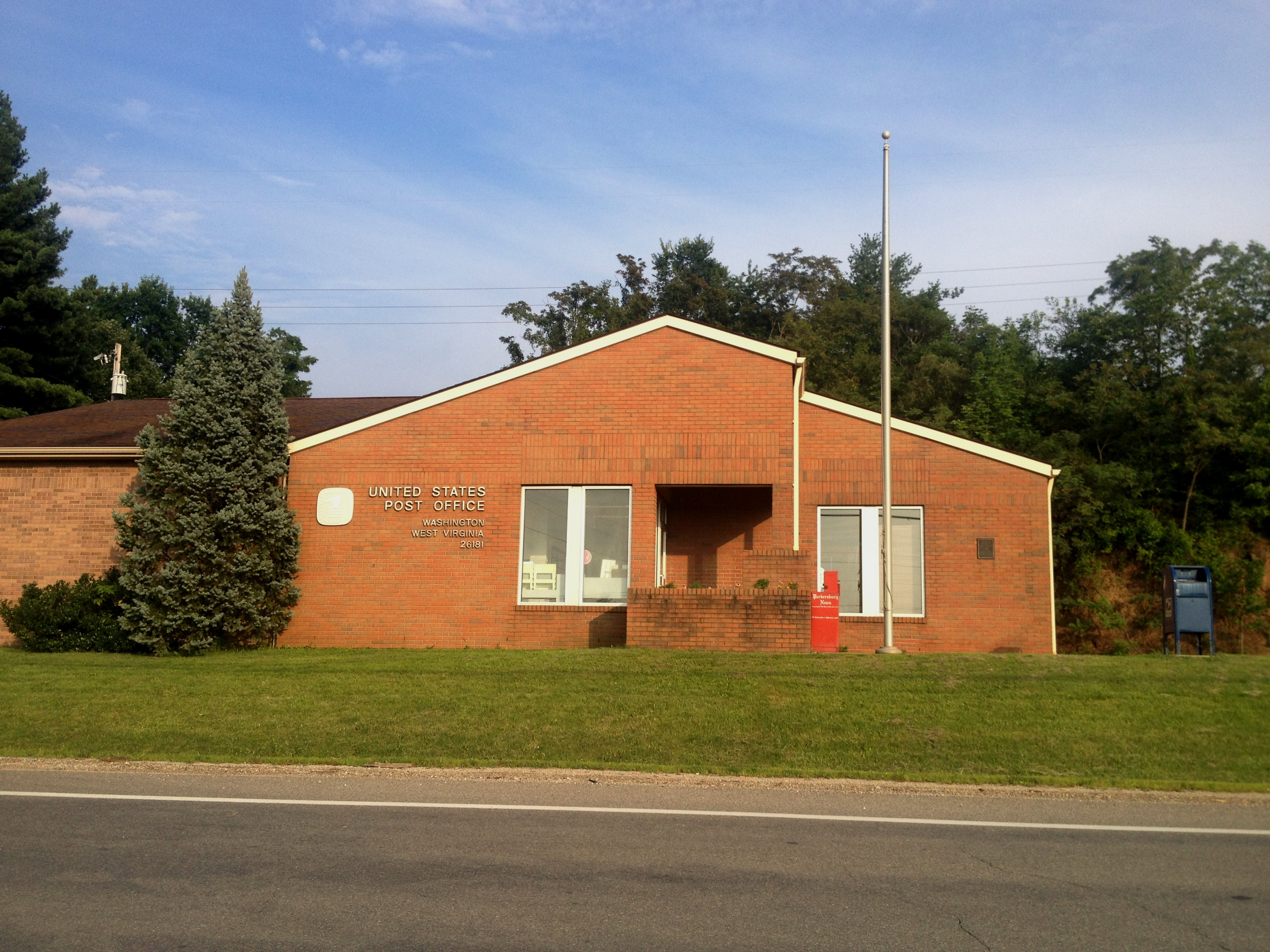
Washington, WV, post office.

Historical population
Census	Pop.	Note	%±
2000	1,170		—
2010	1,175		0.4%
2020	1,151		−2.0%
U.S. Decennial Census

As of the census of 2000, there were 1,170 people, 466 households, and 376 families residing in the community. The population density was 275.6 people per square mile (106.3/km^{2}). There were 518 housing units at an average density of 122.0/sq mi (47.1/km^{2}). The racial makeup of the community was 98.21% White, 0.17% African American, 0.60% Native American, 0.43% Asian, and 0.60% from two or more races.

There were 466 households, out of which 32.8% had children under the age of 18 living with them, 73.0% were married couples living together, 4.9% had a female householder with no husband present, and 19.1% were non-families. 16.7% of all households were made up of individuals, and 4.9% had someone living alone who was 65 years of age or older. The average household size was 2.51 and the average family size was 2.81.

The age distribution is 23.6% under the age of 18, 4.7% from 18 to 24, 26.8% from 25 to 44, 33.8% from 45 to 64, and 11.2% who were 65 years of age or older. The median age was 42 years. For every 100 females, there were 106.3 males. For every 100 females age 18 and over, there were 100.0 males.

The median income for a household in the community was $54,483, and the median income for a community is $60,000. Males had a median income of $48,036 versus $24,712 for females. The per capita income for the CDP was $25,209. About 2.1% of families and 2.3% of the population were below the poverty line, including 3.4% of those under age 18 and 5.1% of those age 65 or over.

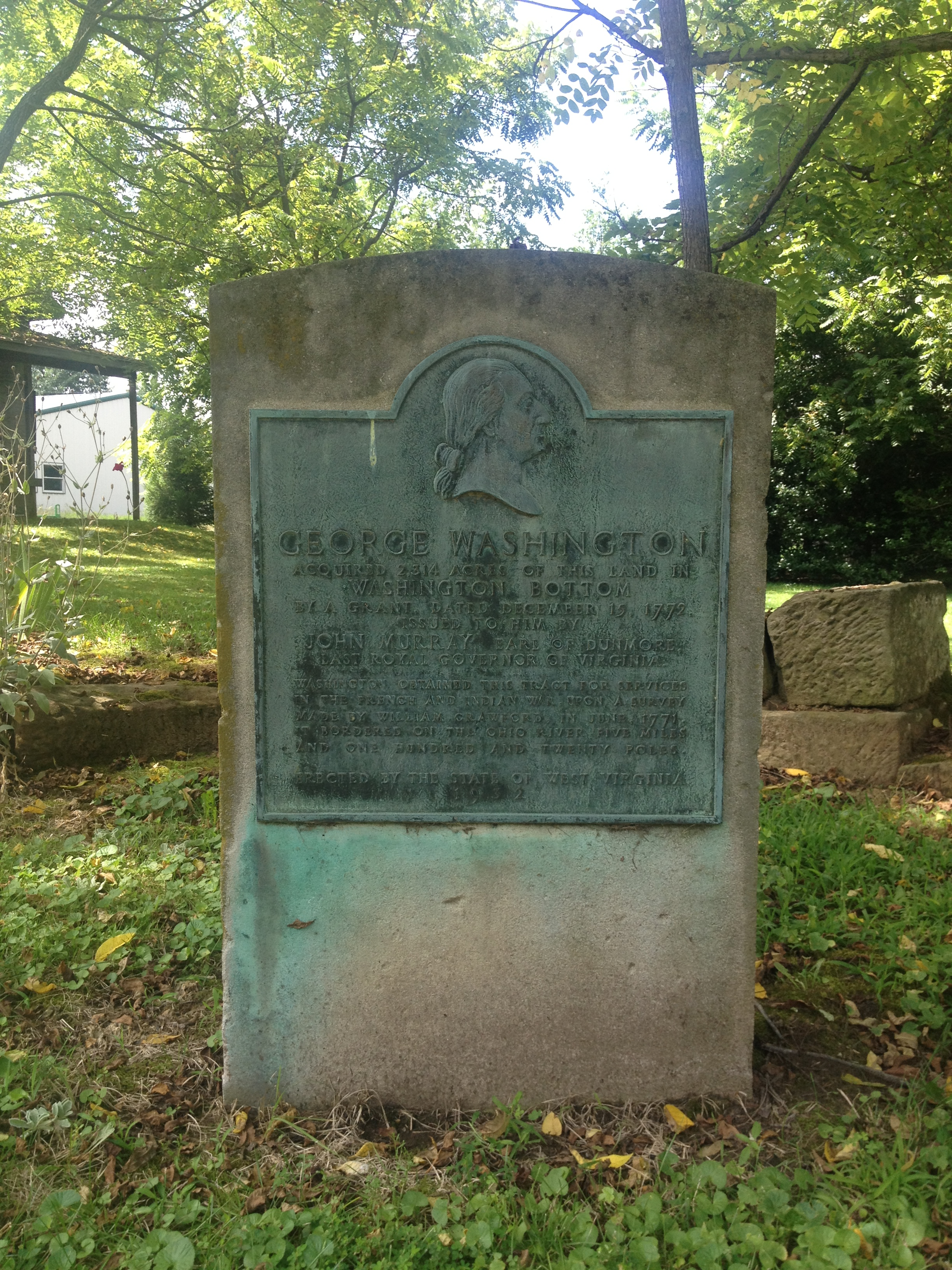
Washington marker in Washington, West Virginia.

== History ==
A commemorative marker located near the Washington, WV, post office reads;

"George Washington acquired 2,314 acres of this land in Washington Bottom by a grant, dated December 15, 1772, issued to him by John Murray, Earl of Dunmore, last Royal Governor of Virginia. Washington obtained this tract for services in the French and Indian War, upon a survey made by William Crawford, in June 1771. It borders on the Ohio River five miles and one hundred and twenty poles. Erected by the State of West Virginia 1932"

== See also ==
- List of cities and towns along the Ohio River
