= Lubeck, West Virginia =

- CDP
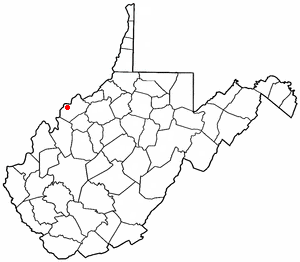
- Location of Lubeck, West Virginia
- Coordinates: 39°13′42″N 81°37′25″W
- Country: United States
- State: West Virginia
- County: Wood

Area
  - Total: 4.2 sq mi (11.0 km^{2})
  - Land: 4.2 sq mi (11.0 km^{2})
  - Water: 0 sq mi (0.0 km^{2})
- Elevation: 846 ft (258 m)

Population (2020)
  - Total: 1,309
  - Density: 308/sq mi (119/km^{2})
- Time zone: UTC-5 (Eastern (EST))
  - Summer (DST): UTC-4 (EDT)
- Area code: 304
- FIPS code: 54-49156
- GNIS feature ID: 2390096

Lubeck is a census-designated place (CDP) in Wood County, West Virginia, United States. It is part of the Parkersburg-Marietta-Vienna metropolitan area. The population was 1,309 at the 2020 census. Though first named Watertown, postmaster Theodore Frederick Henry Slevogt in 1856 changed the name to Lubeck after his hometown in Germany.

== Geography ==
According to the United States Census Bureau, the CDP has a total area of 4.3 square miles (11.0 km^{2}), all land.

== Demographics ==
Historical population
Census	Pop.	Note	%±
2000	1,303		—
2010	1,311		0.6%
2020	1,309		−0.2%
U.S. Decennial Census

At the 2000 census, there were 1,303 people, 510 households and 403 families living in the CDP. The population density was 305.0 per square mile (117.8/km^{2}). There were 540 housing units at an average density of 126.4/sq mi (48.8/km^{2}). The racial makeup of the CDP was 98.70% White, 0.46% African American, 0.08% Native American, 0.08% Asian, 0.08% from other races, and 0.61% from two or more races. Hispanic or Latino of any race were 0.23% of the population.

There were 510 households, of which 32.0% had children under the age of 18 living with them, 67.1% were married couples living together, 8.2% had a female householder with no husband present, and 20.8% were non-families. 18.4% of all households were made up of individuals, and 8.8% had someone living alone who was 65 years of age or older. The average household size was 2.55 and the average family size was 2.86.

23.1% of the population were under the age of 18, 8.2% from 18 to 24, 27.2% from 25 to 44, 28.5% from 45 to 64, and 12.9% who were 65 years of age or older. The median age was 39 years. For every 100 females there were 94.2 males. For every 100 females age 18 and over, there were 94.6 males.

The median household income was $42,614 and the median family income was $49,808. Males had a median income of $40,474 and females $24,489. The per capita income CDP was $19,656. About 9.5% of families and 8.7% of the population were below the poverty line, including 15.5% of those under age 18 and 7.8% of those age 65 or over.

== Pollution ==
The drinking water supply of Lubeck was polluted with PFOA by the DuPont chemical company.
