= U.S. Route 220 in West Virginia =

Segment of American highway

U.S. Route 220
- US 220 highlighted in red

Route information
- Maintained by WVDOH
- Length: 93 mi (150 km)
- Existed: 1926–present

Major junctions
- South end: US 220 near Blue Grass
- US 33 in Franklin; WV 28 / WV 55 in Petersburg; US 48 / WV 55 in Moorefield; US 50 from Junction to New Creek
- North end: US 220 in Keyser

Location
- Country: United States
- State: West Virginia
- Counties: Pendleton, Grant, Hardy, Hampshire, Mineral

Highway system
- United States Numbered Highway System; List; Special; Divided; West Virginia State Highway System; Interstate; US; State
← US 219	→ WV 230

U.S. Route 220 (US 220) is a U.S. Highway that travels from Rockingham, North Carolina, to South Waverly, Pennsylvania. In the state of West Virginia, it travels for 93 miles (150 km) from the Virginia state line two miles (3.2 km) south of Harper to the Maryland state line at Keyser.

== Route description ==
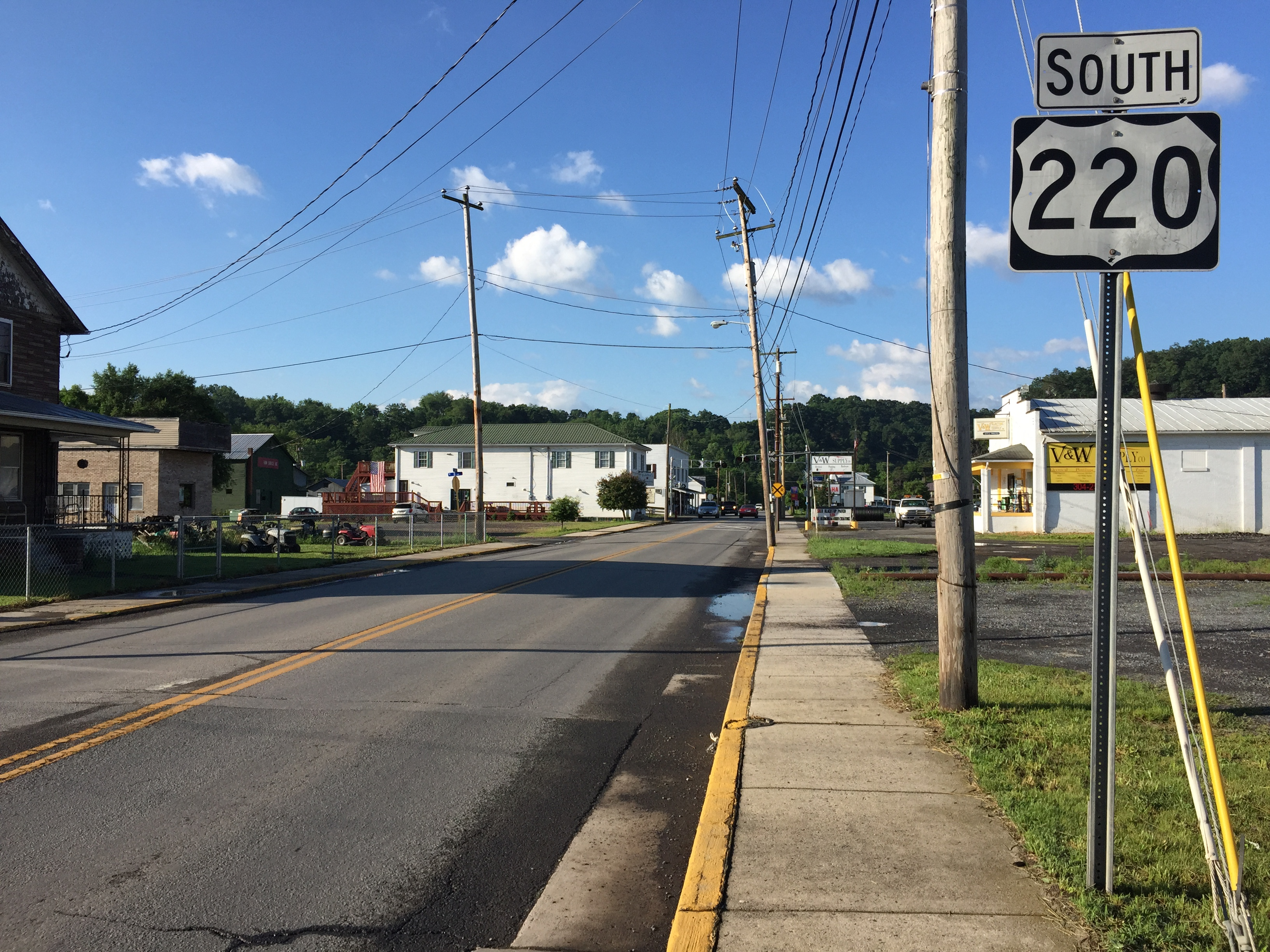
View south along US 220 in Petersburg

The highway enters West Virginia two miles (3.2 km) south of Harper in Pendleton County. From the state line, US 220 parallels the South Branch Potomac River as it progresses northward. 13 miles (21 km) north of Harper, US 220 travels through Franklin, where it intersects US 33. The highway enters Grant County approximately 17 miles (27 km) north of Franklin.

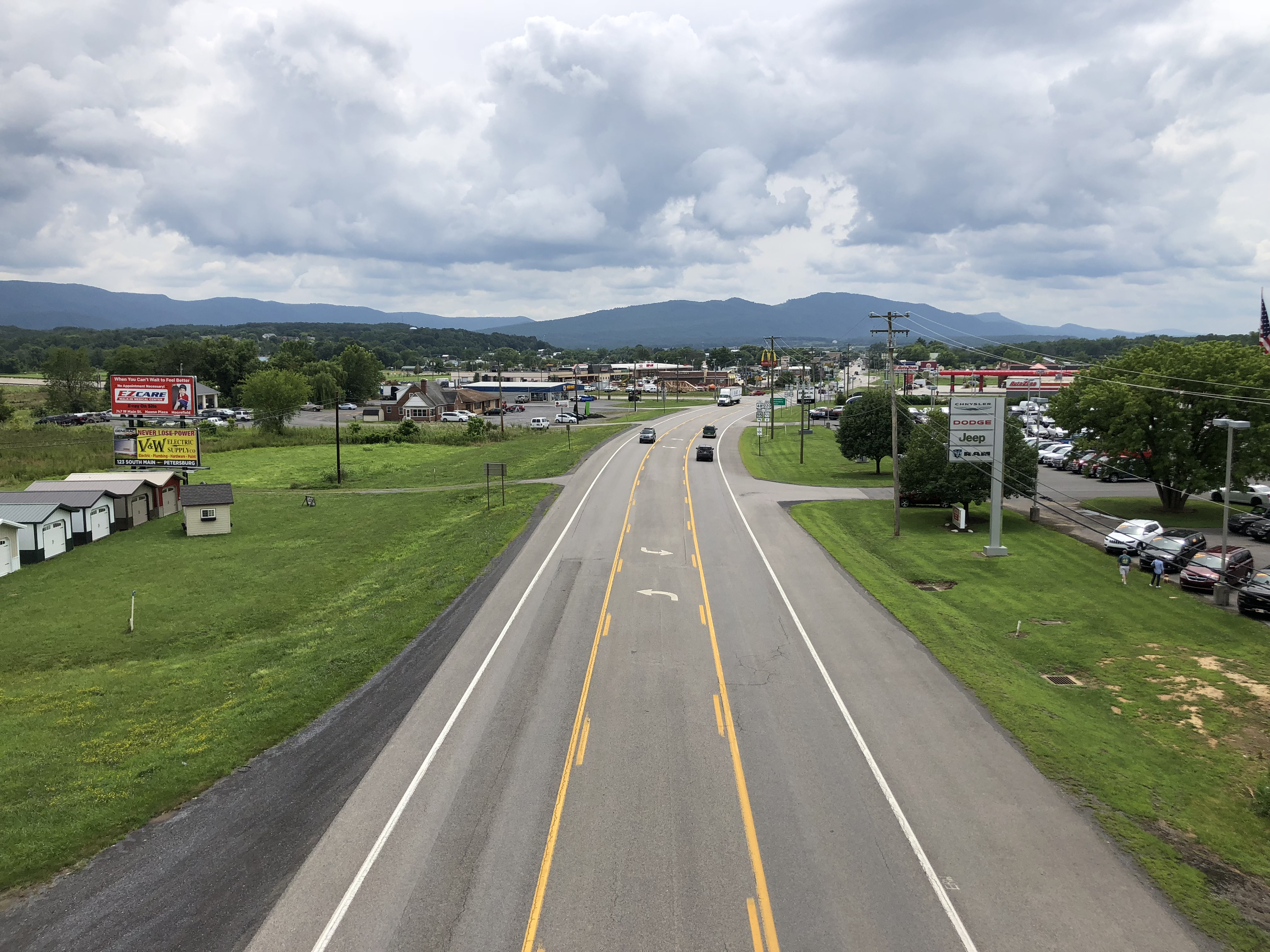
U.S. 220 southbound entering Moorefield

Within Grant County, US 220 intersects the concurrent routes of West Virginia Route 28 (WV 28) and WV 55 in Petersburg. The two state highways join US 220 eastward into Hardy County. WV 28 and WV 55 remain concurrent to Moorefield, where WV 55 splits from US 220/WV 28. North of Moorefield, US 220/WV 28 intersects the future right-of-way of US 48. US 220 and WV 28 remain concurrent into Hampshire County, where they meet US 50 in Junction. WV 28 departs US 220, following US 50 to the east, while US 220 joins US 50 westward into Mineral County. This stretch of US 220 is known as the Northwestern Turnpike.

At the top of Knobly Mountain northwest of Ridgeville, US 220 splits from US 50 and resumes a northerly alignment as it descends into the New Creek Valley. It is known as Cut Off Road south of WV 93 and New Creek Drive from there to Keyser, the county seat of Mineral County, where it becomes known as Mineral Street. In the center of the city, located seven miles (11 km) north of US 50, US 220 intersects WV 46. At the northern edge of Keyser, US 220 crosses the North Branch Potomac River via Memorial Bridge, leaving West Virginia and entering Maryland.

== Junction list ==
County	Location	mi	km	Exit	Destinations	Notes
Pendleton	Harper	0.00	0.00		US 220 south – Monterey	Continuation into Virginia
Pendleton	Franklin				US 33 east (Maple Avenue) – Harrisonburg	Southern end of US 33 concurrency; access to James Madison University
Pendleton	Franklin				US 33 west (Mountaineer Drive) – Seneca Rocks	Northern end of US 33 concurrency; access to Spruce Knob, the highest point in West Virginia
Grant	Petersburg				WV 28 south / WV 55 west (North Main Street) to WV 42 north – Petersburg, Seneca Rocks, Scherr	Southern end of WV 28 and WV 55 concurrencies
Hardy				US 220 South Branch Potomac River Bridge #1		
Hardy	Moorefield				WV 55 east to US 48 – Baker	Northern end of WV 55 concurrency
Hardy				US 220 South Branch Potomac River Bridge #2		
Hampshire	Junction				US 50 east / WV 28 north – Romney, Fort Ashby	Northern end of WV 28 concurrency; southern end of US 50 concurrency
Mineral	New Creek				US 50 west – Grafton	Northern end of US 50 concurrency
Mineral	New Creek				WV 93 west to US 50 west – New Creek, Grafton	Eastern terminus of WV 93
Mineral	Keyser				WV 46 – Piedmont, Fort Ashby	
Mineral	Keyser	93	150		US 220 north – McCoole, Cumberland	Continuation into Maryland at the Potomac River
1.000 mi = 1.609 km; 1.000 km = 0.621 mi: Concurrency terminus
