= Harper, West Virginia =

Harper is the name of several communities in the U.S. state of West Virginia.

- Harper, Pendleton County, West Virginia
- Harper, Raleigh County, West Virginia
