= West Virginia Route 972 =

State highway in West Virginia, United States

West Virginia Route 972
- WV 972 highlighted in red

Route information
- Maintained by WVDOH
- Length: 2.19 mi (3.52 km)
- Existed: 1972–2017

Major junctions
- South end: US 50 near New Creek
- North end: US 220 near New Creek

Location
- Country: United States
- State: West Virginia
- Counties: Mineral

Highway system
- West Virginia State Highway System; Interstate; US; State
| ← WV 971 | → WV 2 |

West Virginia Route 972 was a short north–south state highway in Mineral County, West Virginia. It was decommissioned in July 2017, becoming an extension of WV 93. The route connected U.S. Route 220 to U.S. Route 50 in the New Creek Valley. New Creek, West Virginia, the only populated place on the route, is located midway between US 50 and US 220. Route 972 was the highest numbered road in the state of West Virginia. Prior to 1972, WV 972 was part of US 220. In 1972, US 220 was moved to its present alignment east of New Creek.

== Route description ==
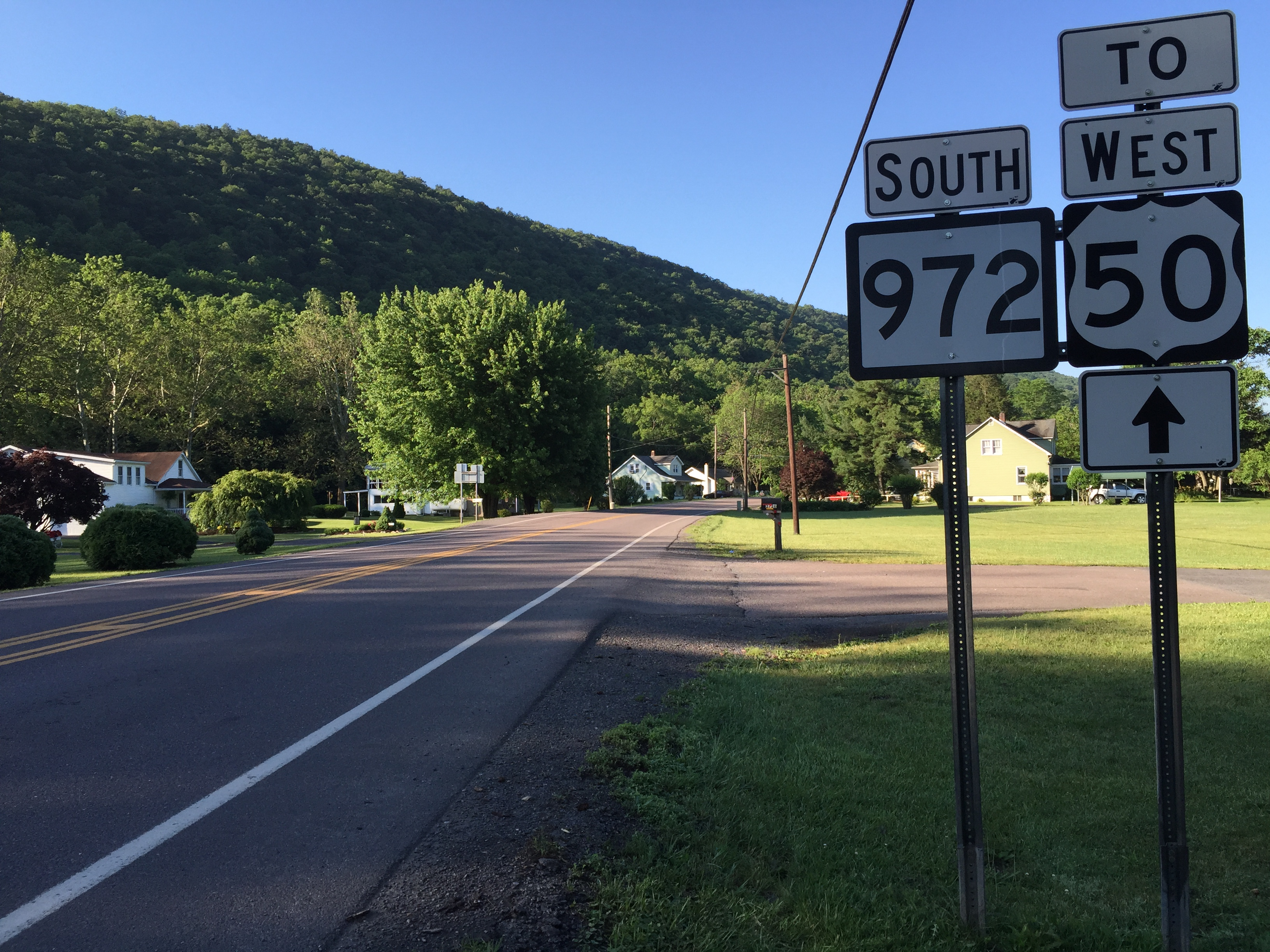
WV 972 headed southward from US 220 near New Creek with signage to approach US 50

Route 972 began at the New Creek Wye in the community of Claysville, West Virginia at an intersection with U.S. Route 50. The highway progressed to the northeast, crossing through residences to the west and forests to the east, crossing Del Signore Farm Road and passing the New Creek School. Route 972 continued through the residences along the nearby mountainside, entering the community of New Creek after an intersection with Kings Run Road. The highway continued northward through New Creek, passing through the downtown farmland and continued its northeastern trek through the mountainside. As Route 972 curved to the north, it passed through downtown New Creek's large set of residences before intersecting with Meadowlark Acre Road and terminating at an intersection with U.S. Route 220 (Cut-Off Road).

== History ==
Route 972 was a former alignment of U.S. Route 220 prior to the building of the New Creek Cut-Off, constructed through Keyser before 1943 through the New Creek Valley. In July 2017, the route became part of an extended WV 93.

== Major intersections ==
The entire route was in Mineral County.

| Location | mi | km | Destinations | Notes |
|---|---|---|---|---|
| New Creek | 0.00 | 0.00 | US 50 – Grafton, Romney | |
| | 2.19 | 3.52 | US 220 – Keyser, Romney, Moorefield | |
1.000 mi = 1.609 km; 1.000 km = 0.621 mi
