= West Virginia Route 32 =

State highway in West Virginia, United States

West Virginia Route 32

Route information
- Maintained by WVDOH
- Length: 21.8 mi (35.1 km)
- Existed: 1931–present

Major junctions
- South end: US 33 / WV 55 in Harman
- US 48 / WV 93 in Davis
- North end: US 48 / US 219 in Thomas

Location
- Country: United States
- State: West Virginia
- Counties: Randolph, Tucker

Highway system
- West Virginia State Highway System; Interstate; US; State
| ← WV 31 | → US 33 |

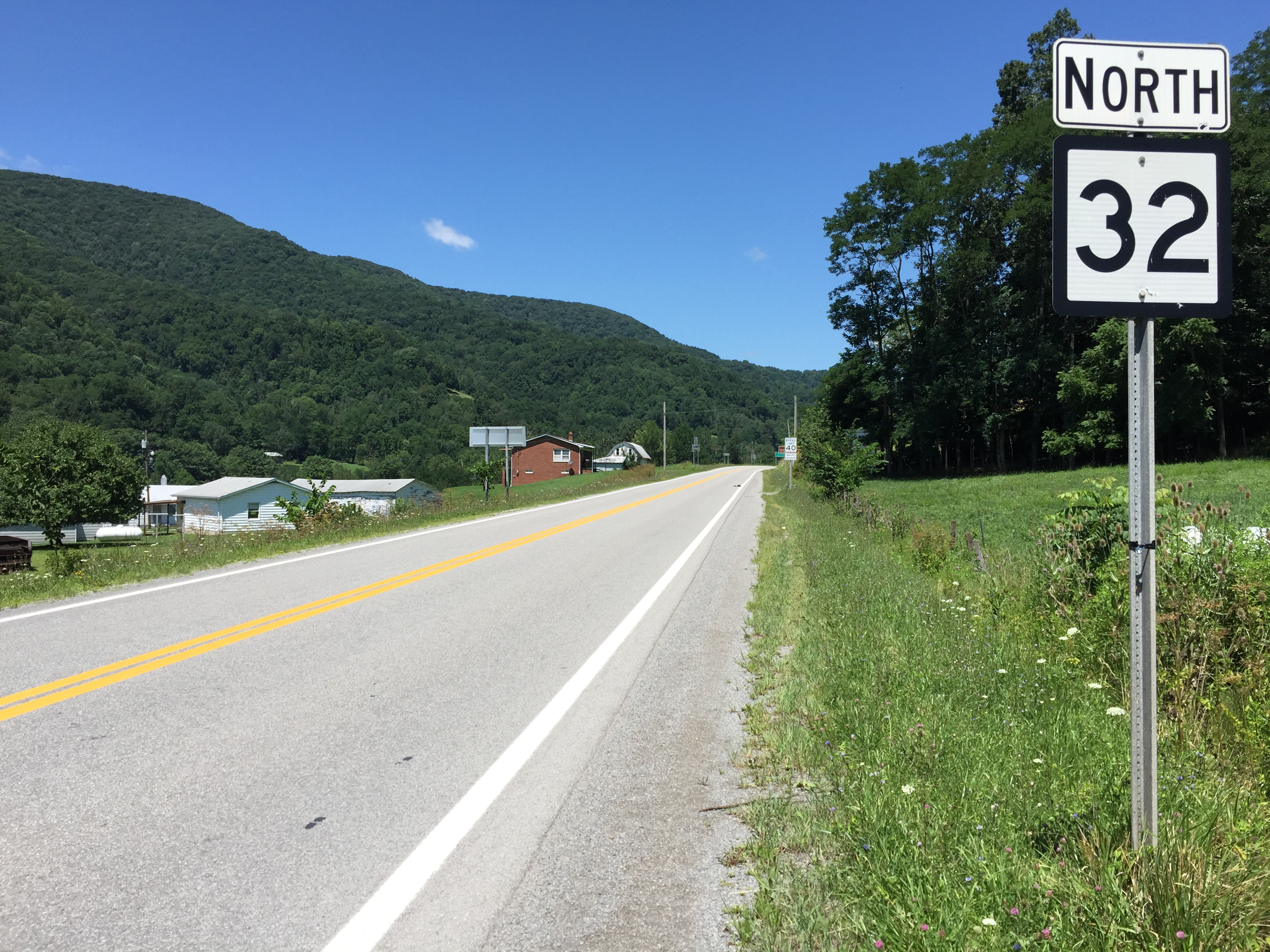
View north along WV 32 at US 33/WV 55 in Harman

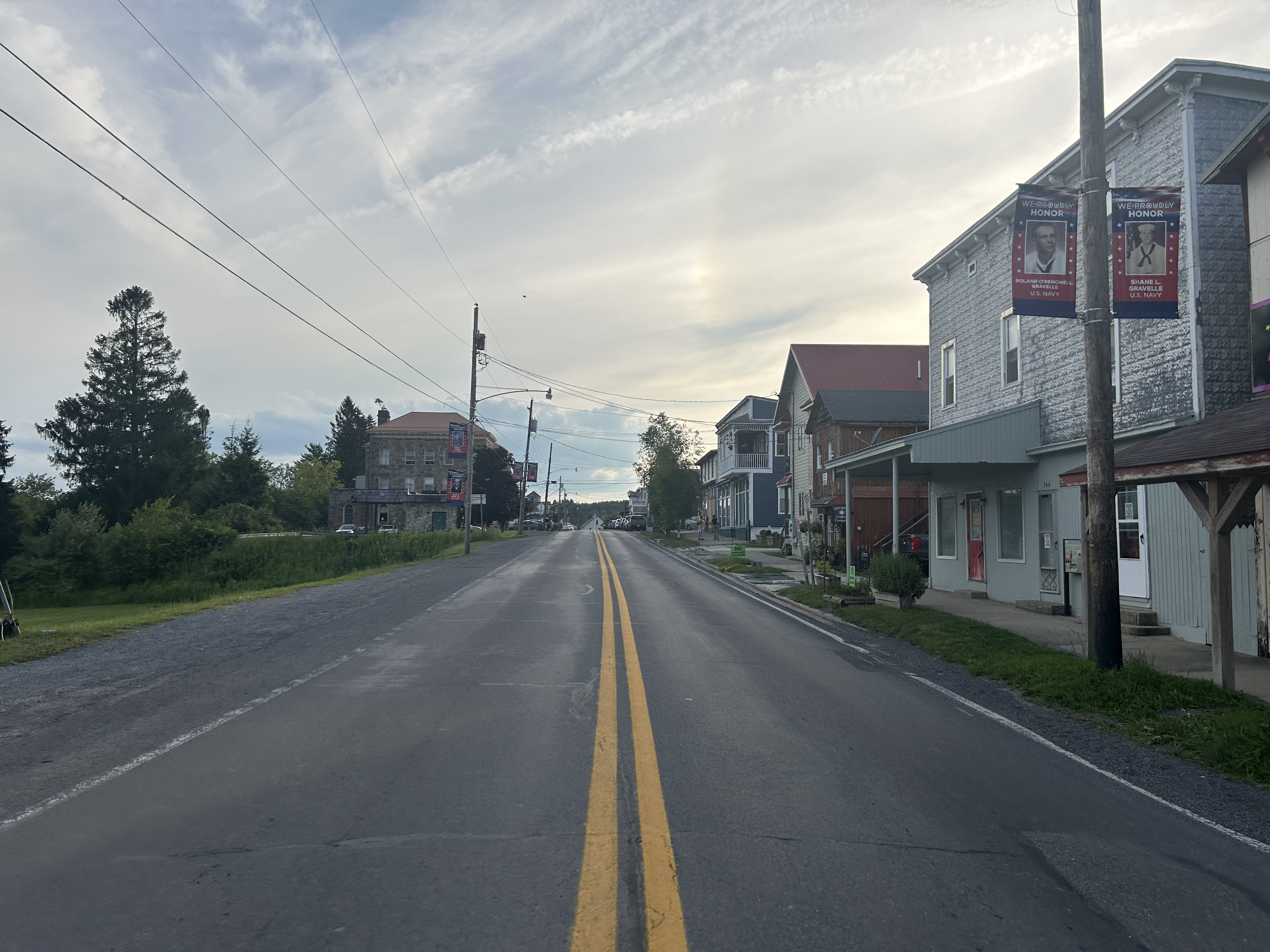
View north along WV 32 in Davis

West Virginia Route 32 is a north–south state highway connecting Randolph County and Tucker County in the northeastern portion of the U.S. state of West Virginia. The southern terminus is at U.S. Route 33 and West Virginia Route 55 in Harman. The northern terminus is at U.S. Route 219 in Thomas. The highway was originally numbered WV 40.

== Major intersections ==
| County | Location | mi | km | Destinations | Notes |
|---|---|---|---|---|---|
| Randolph | Harman | 0.00 | 0.00 | US 33 / WV 55 – Seneca Rocks, Elkins | Southern terminus |
| Tucker | | | | WV 72 north | |
| Tucker | Davis | | | US 48 east / WV 93 east – Mount Storm | |
| Tucker | Davis | | | US 48 – Parsons | Proposed junction |
| Tucker | Thomas | 21.8 | 35.1 | US 48 west / US 219 – Parsons, Oakland MD | Northern terminus |
1.000 mi = 1.609 km; 1.000 km = 0.621 mi: Unopened
