= Maryland Route 38 =

State highway in Garrett County, Maryland, US, known as Kitzmiller Rd

Maryland Route 38
- Kitzmiller Road
- Maryland Route 38 highlighted in red

Route information
- Maintained by MDSHA
- Length: 5.67 mi (9.12 km)
- Existed: 1927–present
- Tourist routes: Mountain Maryland Scenic Byway

Major junctions
- South end: WV 42 in Kitzmiller
- North end: MD 135 near Kitzmiller

Location
- Country: United States
- State: Maryland
- Counties: Garrett

Highway system
- Maryland highway system; Interstate; US; State; Scenic Byways
← MD 36	→ MD 39

Maryland Route 38 (MD 38) is a state highway in the U.S. state of Maryland. Known as Kitzmiller Road, the state highway runs 5.67 miles (9.12 km) from the West Virginia state line at the North Branch Potomac River in Kitzmiller, where the highway continues south as West Virginia Route 42 (WV 42), north to MD 135 on top of Backbone Mountain. MD 38 connects Kitzmiller with the rest of Garrett County and across the North Branch Potomac River to Blaine and Elk Garden in western Mineral County. The state highway was constructed in the late 1920s and early 1930s. MD 38 originally ran from U.S. Route 219 (US 219) near Thayerville through Deer Park and Altamont to Kitzmiller. The state highway was truncated at Backbone Mountain when MD 135 was extended west to Oakland in the mid-1950s.

== Route description ==
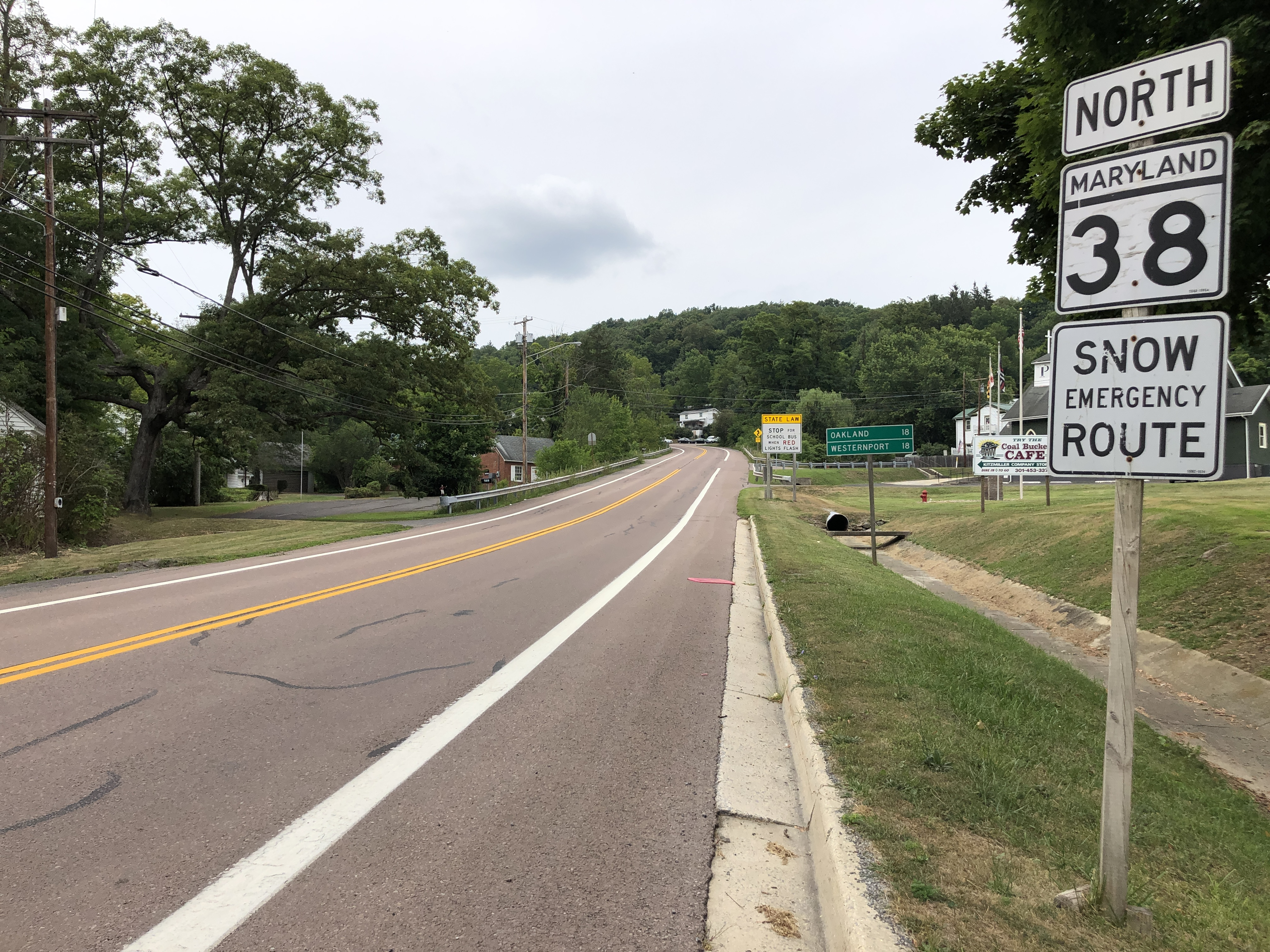
View north along MD 38 in Kitzmiller

MD 38 begins in the town of Kitzmiller at the Kitzmiller Bridge across the North Branch Potomac River. The highway continues on the other side of the river as WV 42 (Blaine Highway) in Blaine. After passing Main Street, MD 38 begins its steep, curvy ascent of Backbone Mountain as a two-lane undivided road. The southbound direction of the state highway features a mandatory truck stop to check brakes at the top of the 2-mile (3.2 km) hill. Beyond the truck pull-off, MD 38 continues uphill at a more gentle gradient all the way to its northern terminus at MD 135 (Maryland Highway) on the ridgeline of Backbone Mountain.

== History ==
MD 38 originally extended north toward Deep Creek Lake. The state highway descended Backbone Mountain toward Altamont and continued west to Deer Park following what is now MD 135 and Edgewood Drive into the center of the town. In Deer Park, MD 38 turned north along Main Street and followed Sand Flat Road to US 219 near Thayerville. MD 38 was paved from its original northern terminus through Deer Park to Altamont between 1924 and 1926. The highway was extended east to the top of Backbone Mountain by 1930; this construction included the bridge over the Baltimore and Ohio Railroad at Altamont. The present segment of MD 38 south to Kitzmiller was under construction by 1930 and completed in 1933. The present bridge across the North Branch Potomac River and an approach road beginning at State Street on the north were completed in 1955. This bridge replaced the original 1892 bridge that crossed the river just to the east of the present crossing. MD 38 was rolled back to its current northern terminus on top of Backbone Mountain in 1956. MD 135 was relocated onto the portion of MD 38 between MD 38's present terminus and Deer Park and extended west toward Oakland. Sand Flat Road was transferred to county maintenance.

== Junction list ==
The entire route is in Garrett County.

Location	mi	km	Destinations	Notes
Kitzmiller	0.00	0.00	WV 42 south (Blaine Highway) – Blaine, Elk Garden	West Virginia state line at North Branch Potomac River; southern terminus
	5.67	9.12	MD 135 (Maryland Highway) – Oakland, Westernport	Northern terminus
1.000 mi = 1.609 km; 1.000 km = 0.621 mi

== Auxiliary routes ==
MD 38 has two auxiliary routes, both located at the highway's intersection with MD 135 on top of Backbone Mountain.

- MD 38A is the designation for the tight 0.01-mile (0.016 km) ramp from northbound MD 38 to eastbound MD 135.
- MD 38B is the designation for the sweeping 0.19-mile (0.31 km) ramp from eastbound MD 135 to southbound MD 38.
