= New Creek Mountain =

Mountain in the U.S. state of West Virginia

Highest point
- Elevation: 3,084 ft (940 m) NAVD 88
- Coordinates: 39°13′40.91″N 79°07′43.59″W

Geography
- Location: Grant / Mineral counties, West Virginia, U.S.
- Parent range: Ridge-and-Valley Appalachians
- Topo map: USGS Greenland Gap

Climbing
- Easiest route: Hike

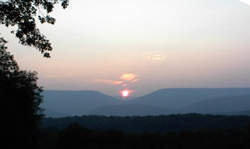
Saddle Mountain, part of New Creek Mountain, as viewed at sunrise from Skyline on U.S. Route 50 in West Virginia

New Creek Mountain is a mountain ridge of the Ridge-and-Valley Appalachians in Grant and Mineral counties in the U.S. state of West Virginia. The mountain is named for New Creek which rises and flows along its western flanks. It is part of the Wills Mountain Anticline, with Knobly Mountain along its eastern flank. The Allegheny Front rises steeply to the west of New Creek Mountain. Oriskany (Ridgeley) sandstone cliffs ring the entire mountain.

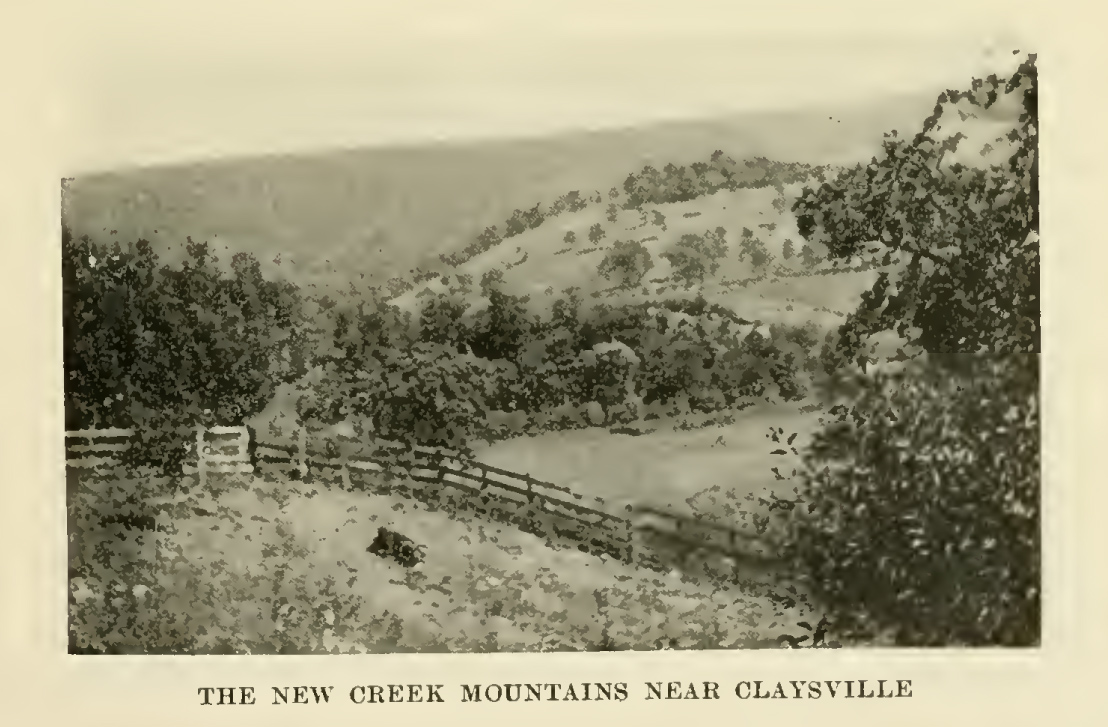
New Creek Mountain near Claysville, WV, circa 1908

Saddle Mountain, prominent in the view eastward from the Skyland Overlook on U.S. 50, is a saddle-shaped dip in the mountain's ridgecrest.

The New Creek Mountain Cliffs are 800 feet (240 m) high, lining a great cleft in the mountain that rivals the famed Franconia Notch of New England.
