= Saddle Mountain (Mineral County, West Virginia) =

Mountain in Mineral County, West Virginia

Coordinates: 39°18′09″N 79°04′44″W

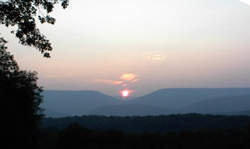
Saddle Mountain as viewed at sunrise from Skyline, on U.S. Route 50 in West Virginia

Saddle Mountain is a section of New Creek Mountain in the Ridge and Valley physiographic province of the Appalachian Mountains in Mineral County, West Virginia. The mountain is so named for its shape. It is best viewed from Skyline which is located to the west along US 50 at the intersection with WV 42, atop the Allegheny Front. The mountain's elevation is 3,074 feet (937 m).
