= West Virginia Route 93 =

State highway in West Virginia, United States

West Virginia Route 93

Route information
- Maintained by WVDOH
- Length: 37.8 mi (60.8 km)
- Existed: 1957–present

Major junctions
- West end: US 48 / WV 32 in Davis
- WV 42 near Scherr; US 50 near Claysville
- East end: US 220 near Keyser

Location
- Country: United States
- State: West Virginia
- Counties: Tucker, Grant, Mineral

Highway system
- West Virginia State Highway System; Interstate; US; State
← WV 92	→ WV 94

West Virginia Route 93 is an east–west state highway located in the Eastern Panhandle of West Virginia. WV 93 runs from U.S. Route 48 and West Virginia Route 32 in Davis in Tucker County to U.S. Route 220 near Keyser in Mineral County.

== Route description ==
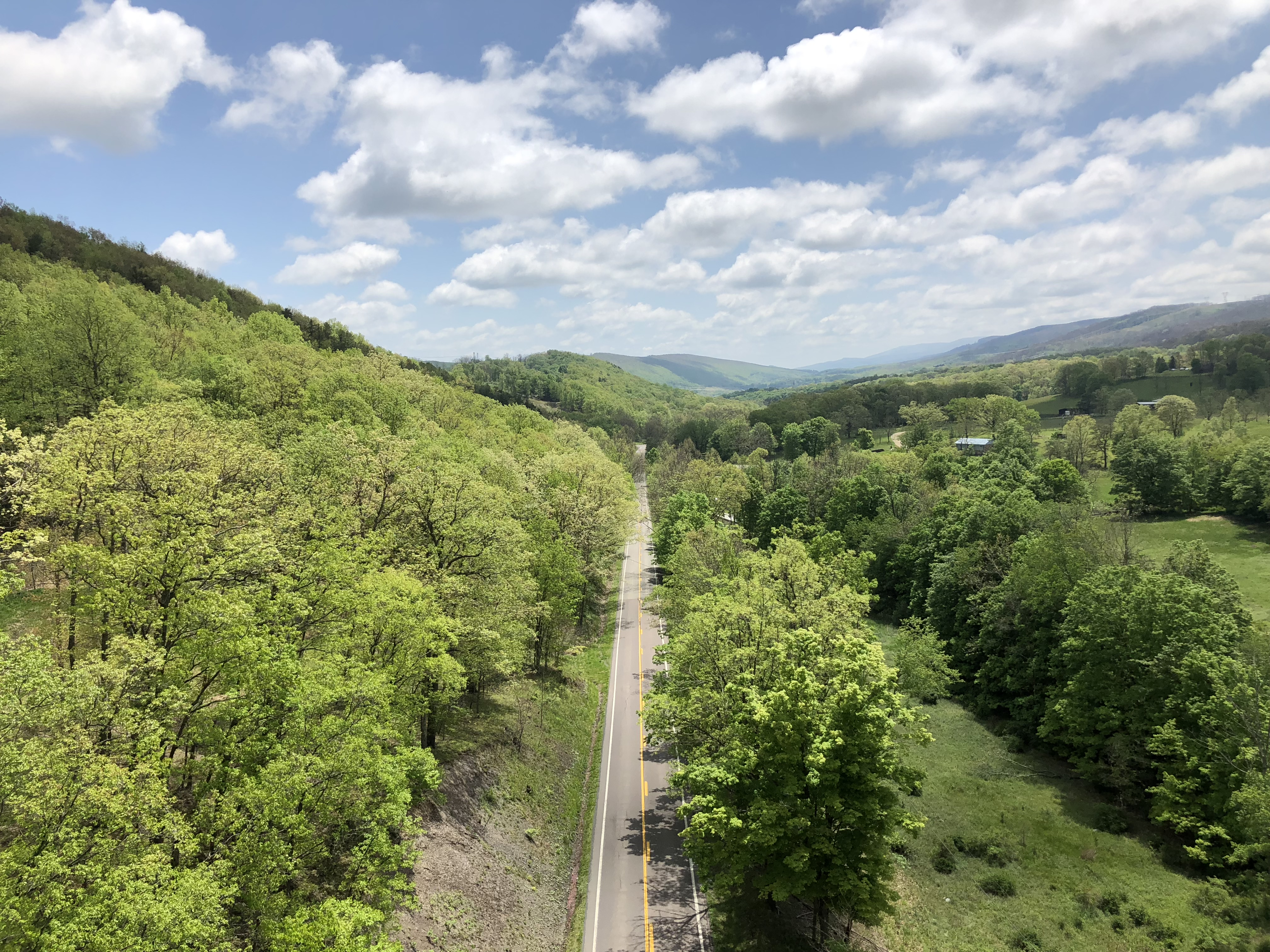
WV 93 westbound viewed from US 48 near Scherr in Grant County

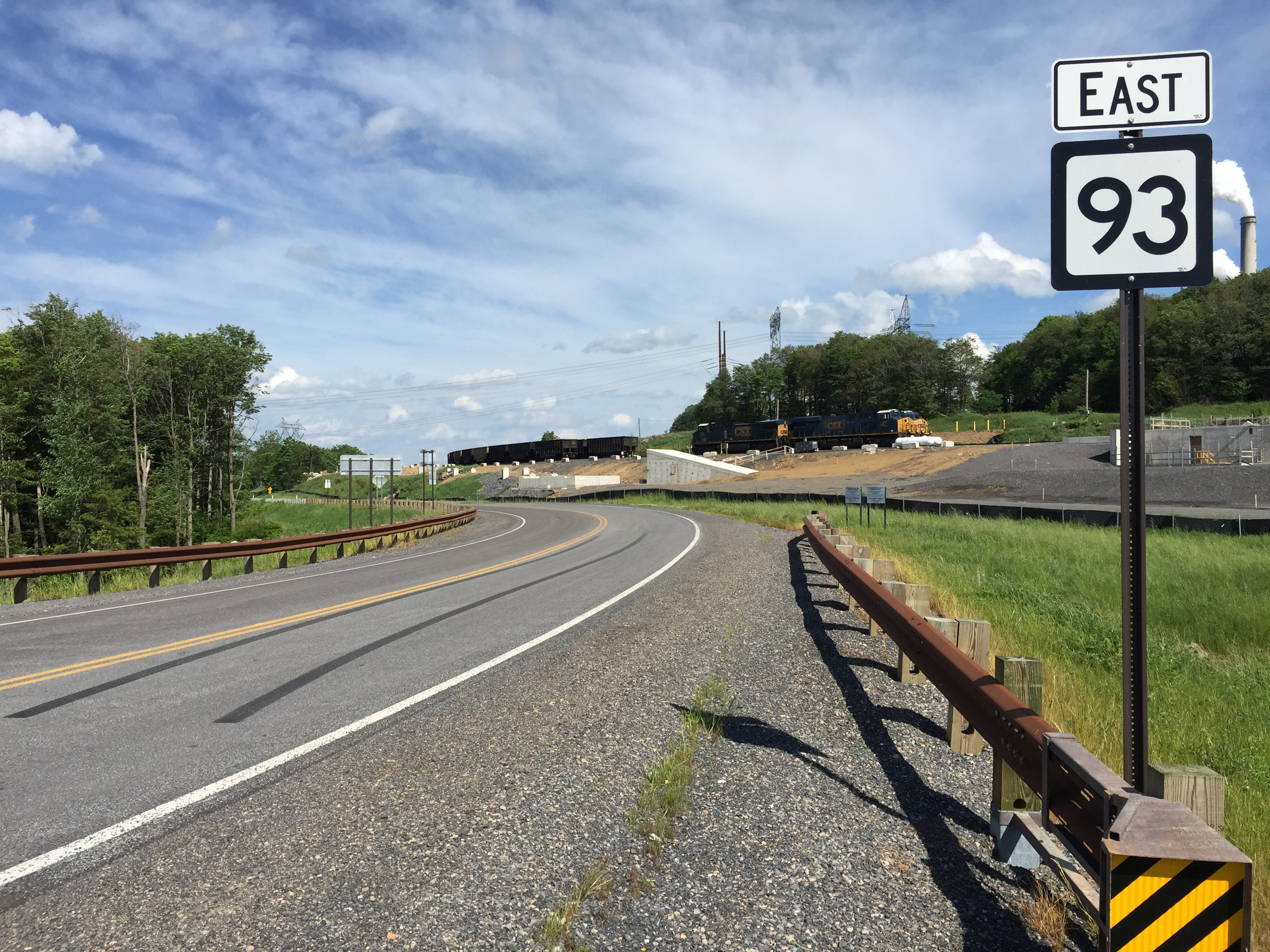
View east along WV 93 east of US 48 near Bismarck

The western terminus of the route is at West Virginia Route 32 in Davis, Tucker County. It is concurrent with U.S. Route 48 (Corridor H) between Davis and Bismarck. WV 93 passes by the Mount Storm Lake near Mount Storm. WV 93 then runs concurrent with West Virginia Route 42 upon descending the Allegheny Front.

Until July 2017, the eastern terminus was at U.S. Route 50 southwest of Claysville in Mineral County. In July 2017, WV 972 was decommissioned, and WV 93 was extended eastward, running concurrent with US 50 to the former WV 972 near New Creek, and then following the former route of WV 972 through New Creek. It terminates at an intersection with US 220 (Cut-Off Road).

== Attractions ==
=== Historical sites ===
- Claysville Church
- Log House of Claysville

== Major intersections ==
County	Location	mi	km	Destinations	Notes
Tucker	Davis	0.00	0.00	US 48 west / WV 32 – Davis, Thomas	Western terminus
Grant				US 48 east – Moorefield	East end of US 48 overlap
Grant				US 48 – Davis, Moorefield	Interchange
Grant				WV 42 north – Mount Storm	West end of WV 42 overlap
Grant	Scherr			WV 42 south – Petersburg	East end of WV 42 overlap
Grant				To US 48 – Davis, Moorefield	Access road
Mineral	Claysville			US 50 west – Grafton	West end of US 50 overlap
Mineral	New Creek			US 50 east to US 220 south – Romney	East end of US 50 overlap
Mineral		37.8	60.8	US 220 to US 50 east – Keyser, Moorefield	Eastern terminus
1.000 mi = 1.609 km; 1.000 km = 0.621 mi: Concurrency terminus
