= West Virginia Route 131 =

State highway in West Virginia, United States

West Virginia Route 131

Route information
- Maintained by WVDOH
- Length: 10.9 mi (17.5 km)

Major junctions
- North end: US 19 in Shinnston
- I-79 near Bridgeport
- South end: US 50 in Bridgeport

Location
- Country: United States
- State: West Virginia
- Counties: Harrison

Highway system
- West Virginia State Highway System; Interstate; US; State
← WV 129	→ WV 150

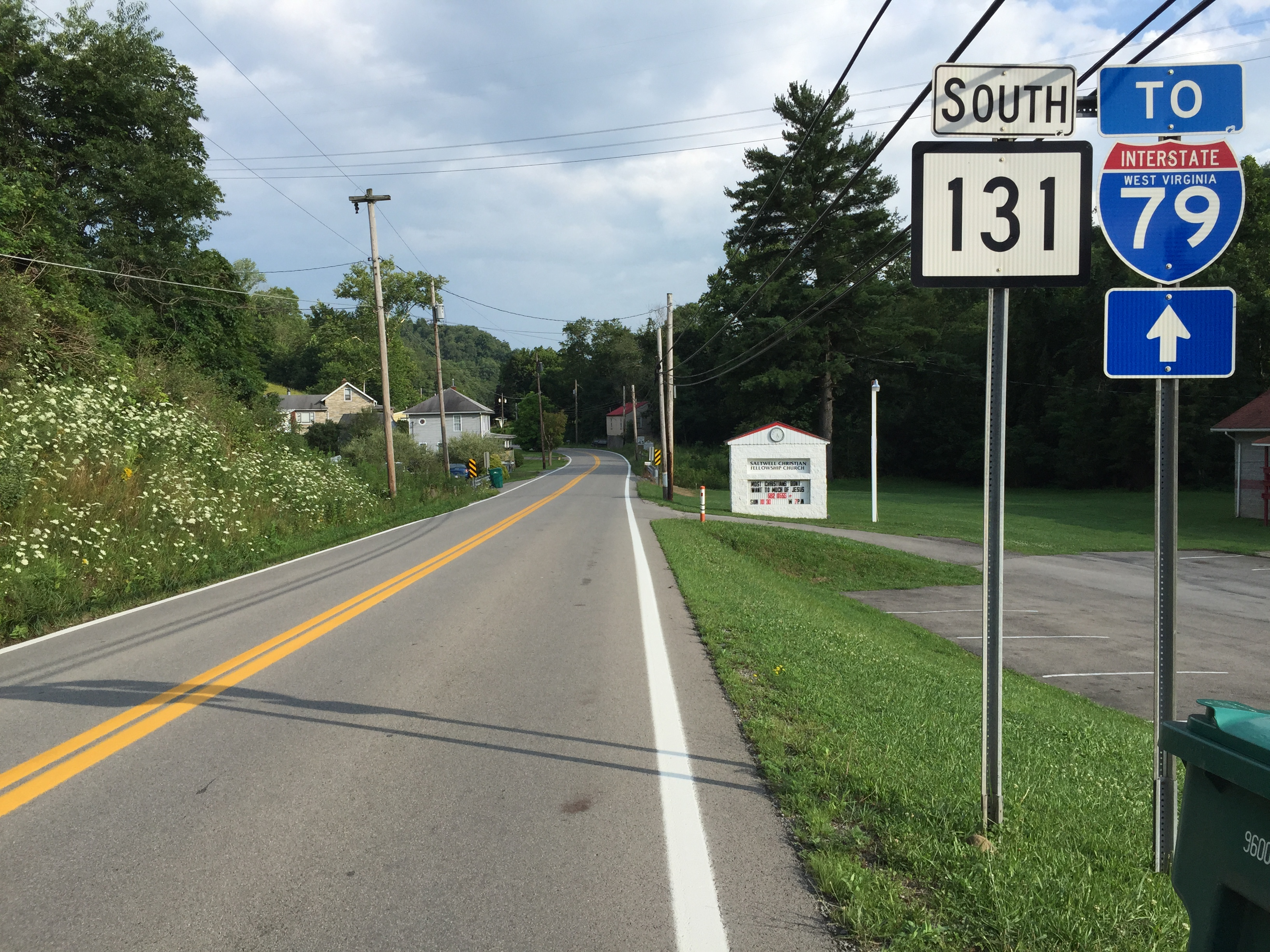
View south along WV 131 at CR 13/2 in Saltwell

West Virginia Route 131 is a north–south state highway located in northern West Virginia. The northern terminus is at U.S. Route 19 in Shinnston. The southern terminus is at U.S. Route 50 in Bridgeport.

The part of WV 131 running north–south from US 50 past I-79 is former WV 73, which continued to Morgantown and Bruceton Mills along the I-79 and I-68 corridors. The remainder of WV 131, along Saltwell Road, was County Route 13. The numerators of county routes spurring from WV 131 still reflect these former numbers.

== Major intersections ==
The entire route is in Harrison County.

Location	mi	km	Destinations	Notes
Bridgeport			US 50 – Grafton, Clarksburg	
Ryanville			WV 279 (Jerry Dove Drive) to US 50	interchange
Bridgeport			I-79 – Clarksburg, Fairmont	I-79 exit 125
Bridgeport			CR 73/73 (Old Route 73) – White Hall	former WV 73 north
Bridgeport			CR 707 south to I-79 south – FBI Center	
Shinnston			US 19	
1.000 mi = 1.609 km; 1.000 km = 0.621 mi
