= West Virginia Route 31 =

State highway in West Virginia, United States

West Virginia Route 31

Route information
- Maintained by WVDOH
- Length: 36.7 mi (59.1 km)

Major junctions
- South end: WV 16 in Harrisville
- US 50 near Cairo; WV 2 near Waverly; WV 14 concurrent near Williamstown
- North end: SR 60 in Marietta, Ohio

Location
- Country: United States
- State: West Virginia
- Counties: Wood, Ritchie

Highway system
- West Virginia State Highway System; Interstate; US; State
← US 30	→ WV 32

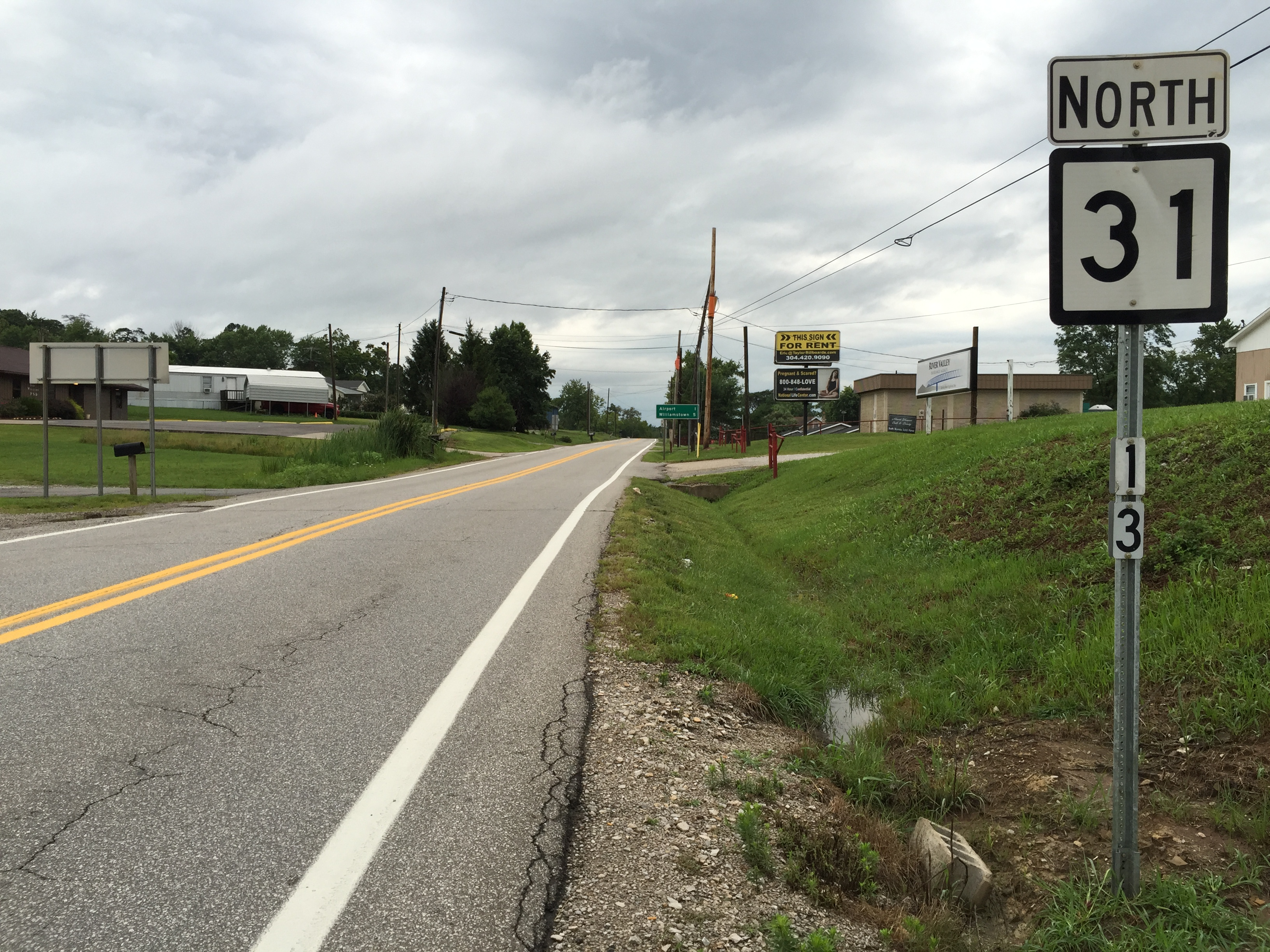
View north along WV 31 at WV 2 in Wood County

West Virginia Route 31 is a north–south state highway in the northwestern portion of the U.S. state of West Virginia. The northern terminus of the route is at the Ohio state line on the Williamstown Bridge over the Ohio River. The southern terminus is at West Virginia Route 16 in Harrisville, West Virginia.

The northernmost extent of the route from West Virginia Route 14 near Interstate 77 Exit 185 southeast of Williamstown to the Ohio state line is not signed.

== Major intersections ==
County	Location	mi	km	Destinations	Notes
Ritchie	Harrisville			WV 16 (Spring Street) – Ellenboro, Grantsville	
Ritchie				US 50 east – Clarksburg	south end of US 50 overlap
Wood	Deerwalk			US 50 west / CR 50/16 (Riser Ridge Road) – Parkersburg	north end of US 50 overlap
Wood				WV 2 south – Parkersburg	south end of WV 2 overlap
Wood				WV 2 north – Wheeling	north end of WV 2 overlap
Wood	Williamstown			WV 14 north to I-77 – Parkersburg, Marietta, OH	north end of signed WV 31; south end of WV 14 overlap
Wood	Williamstown			WV 14 south – Vienna	north end of WV 14 overlap
Wood	Williamstown			To Williamstown Bridge (SR 60 north) / SR 7 – Marietta	
1.000 mi = 1.609 km; 1.000 km = 0.621 mi: Concurrency terminus
