= Blaine, West Virginia =

Unincorporated community in West Virginia, United States

Blaine
- Unincorporated community
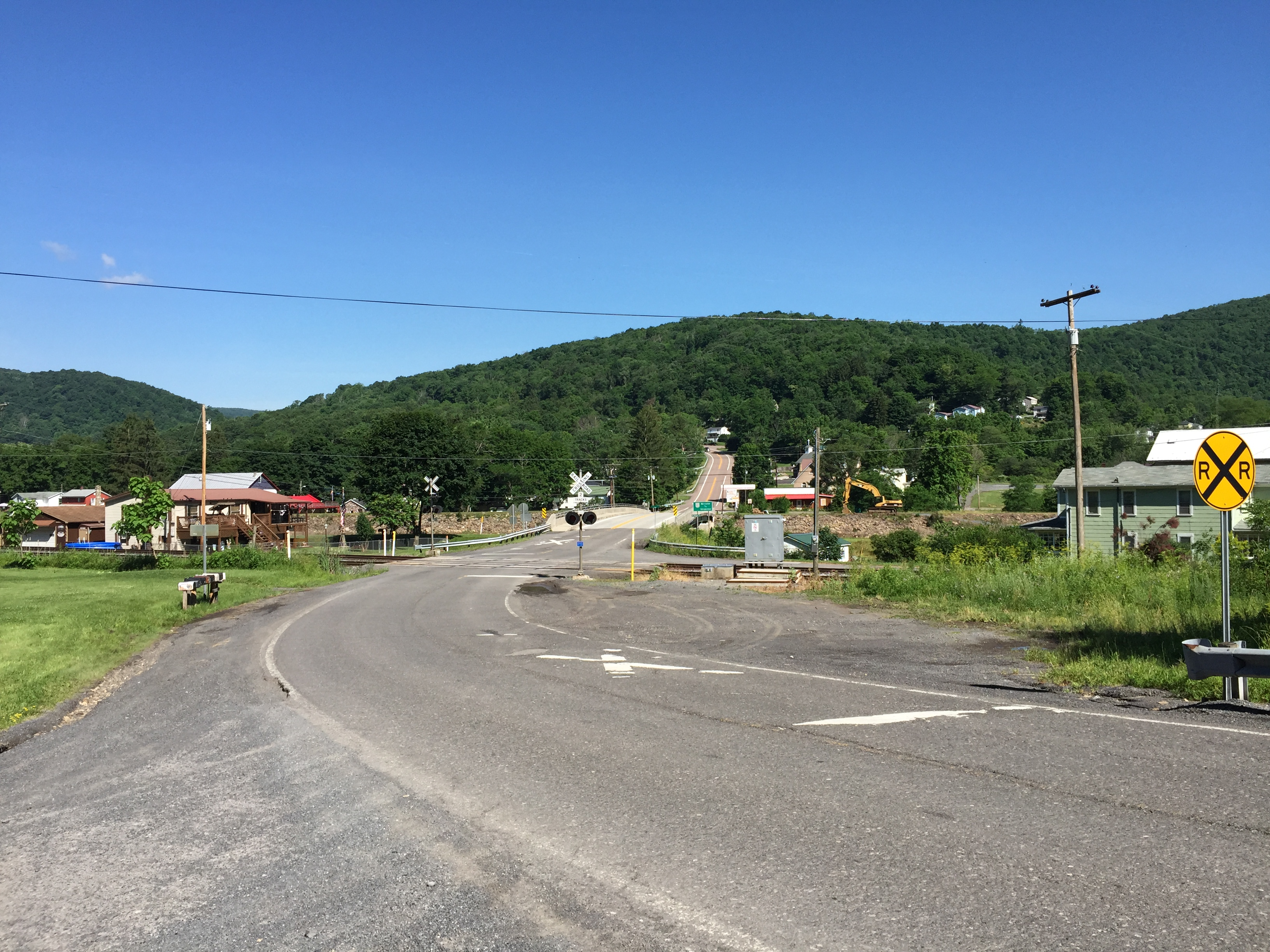
- West Virginia Route 42 in Blaine. Kitzmiller, Maryland can be seen in the distance, across the bridge over the North Branch Potomac River

- Location within the state of West Virginia Blaine (the United States)
- Coordinates: 39°23′09″N 79°10′47″W
- Country: United States
- State: West Virginia
- County: Mineral
- Elevation: 1,631 ft (497 m)
- Time zone: UTC-5 (Eastern (EST))
  - Summer (DST): UTC-4 (EDT)
- GNIS feature ID: 1553919

Blaine is an unincorporated community in Mineral County, West Virginia, United States. It is part of the Cumberland, MD-WV Metropolitan Statistical Area. It lies near the intersection of the North Branch Potomac River and West Virginia Route 42.

The community has the name of James G. Blaine, a businessperson.
