= U.S. Route 50 in West Virginia =

Segment of American highway

U.S. Route 50
- U.S. Route 50 in West Virginia, in red

Route information
- Maintained by WVDOH
- Length: 196.20 mi (315.75 km)
- Existed: 1926–present

Western section
- West end: US 50 / SR 32 in Belpre, OH
- Major intersections: I-77 in Parkersburg; US 19 in Clarksburg; I-79 in Clarksburg; US 250 near Grafton; US 119 in Grafton
- East end: US 50 near Brookside

Eastern section
- West end: US 50 in Gormania
- Major intersections: US 220 in New Creek
- East end: US 50 towards Winchester, VA

Location
- Country: United States
- State: West Virginia
- Counties: Wood, Ritchie, Doddridge, Harrison, Taylor, Preston; Grant, Mineral, Hampshire

Highway system
- United States Numbered Highway System; List; Special; Divided; West Virginia State Highway System; Interstate; US; State
← WV 49	→ WV 51

U.S. Route 50 (US 50) in West Virginia runs from the border with Ohio to Virginia, passing briefly through Garrett County, Maryland, and following the Northwestern Turnpike. Prior to the U.S. Highway System it was West Virginia Route 1 and in the 1930s, the road was not finished in Maryland. Today the section of US 50 from Clarksburg to Parkersburg on the Ohio River is part of Corridor D of the Appalachian Development Highway System.

Between Parkersburg and Wolf Summit, Route 50 roughly parallels the North Bend Rail Trail and crosses the trail at three places.

== Route description ==
=== Western segment ===
US 50 crosses the Ohio River on a bridge, with Blennerhassett Island in the middle of the river. It continues as a freeway with two interchanges at Route 892, and runs concurrently with Route 68 starting at the second interchange up to where it exits and heads into downtown Parkersburg. US 50 stays on the southern shore of the Little Kanawha River, intersecting Route 14 and then after crossing the river, Route 47 and Route 618 before becoming a divided expressway at the I-77 interchange. US 50 then briefly turns south before heading east through the forest. South of Deerwalk, the route runs concurrently with Route 31 for a few miles. In Ellenboro, US 50 has an interchange with Route 16, providing access into the town; an intersection with Route 74 does the same for Pennsboro, and several miles later, Route 18 for West Union. Route 23 intersects the highway west of East Salem and Bristol.

Upon entering Clarksburg, there is a diamond interchange with US 19 and Route 20 before US 50 passes through the town as a freeway, with several interchanges, including another with Route 20. After an interchange with I-79, US 50 becomes Main Street, passing through the city of Bridgeport and intersecting Route 131 and passing south of the North Central West Virginia Airport. The route intersects Route 279 and then runs concurrently with US 250 until just before US 50 enters Fetterman and then Grafton. US 50 intersects US 119 in the eastern part of the city before continuing east through Thornton and curving through the mountains to Evansville. Route 92 briefly runs concurrently with the highway, and Route 26 intersects the route near Fellowsville. After several miles through the forest, Route 72 briefly runs concurrently with the highway before US 50 continues east into Aurora and intersects Route 24. Then, US 50 crosses into Maryland.

=== Eastern segment ===
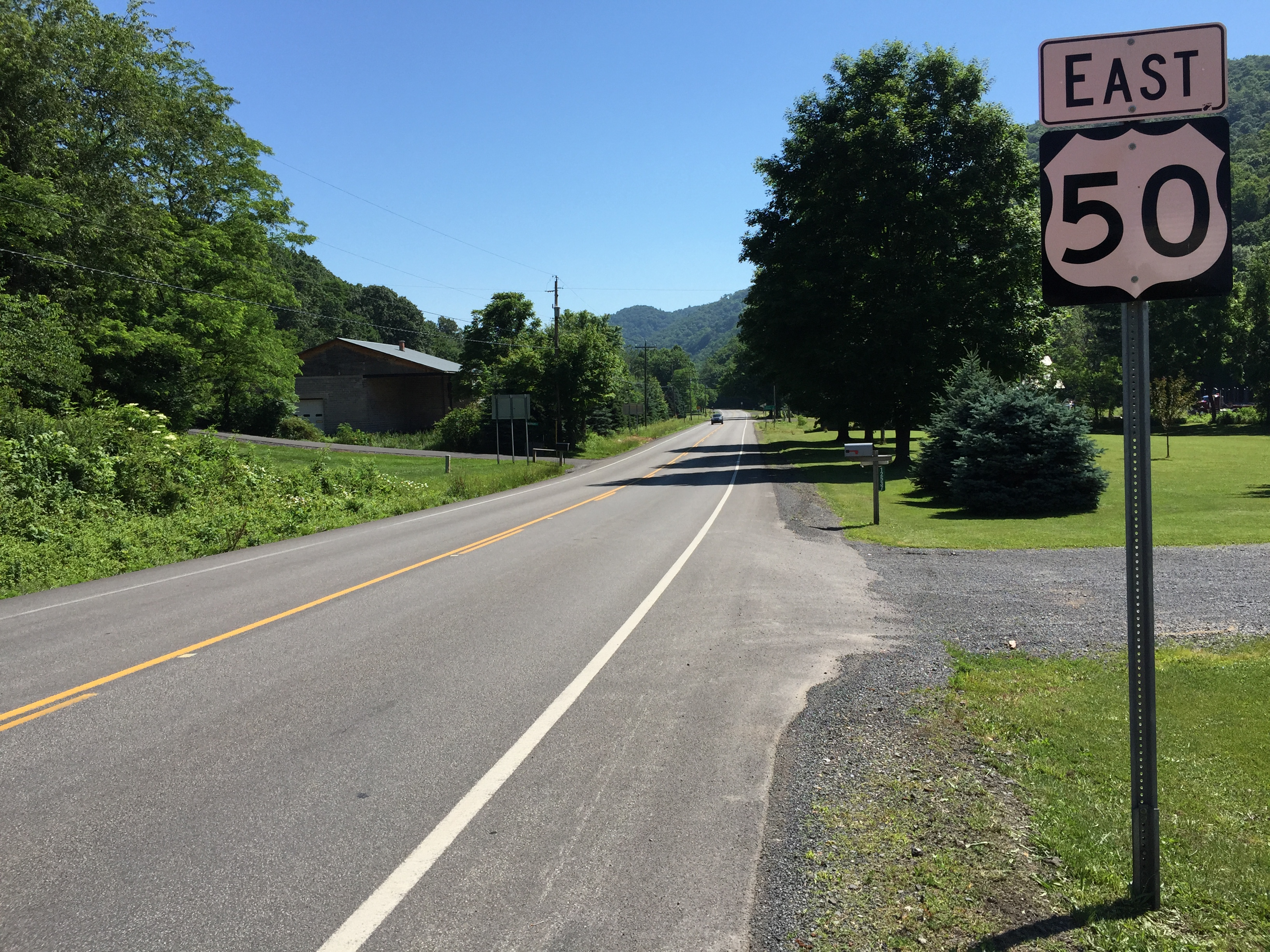
View east along US 50 east of WV 93 in Claysville, Mineral County

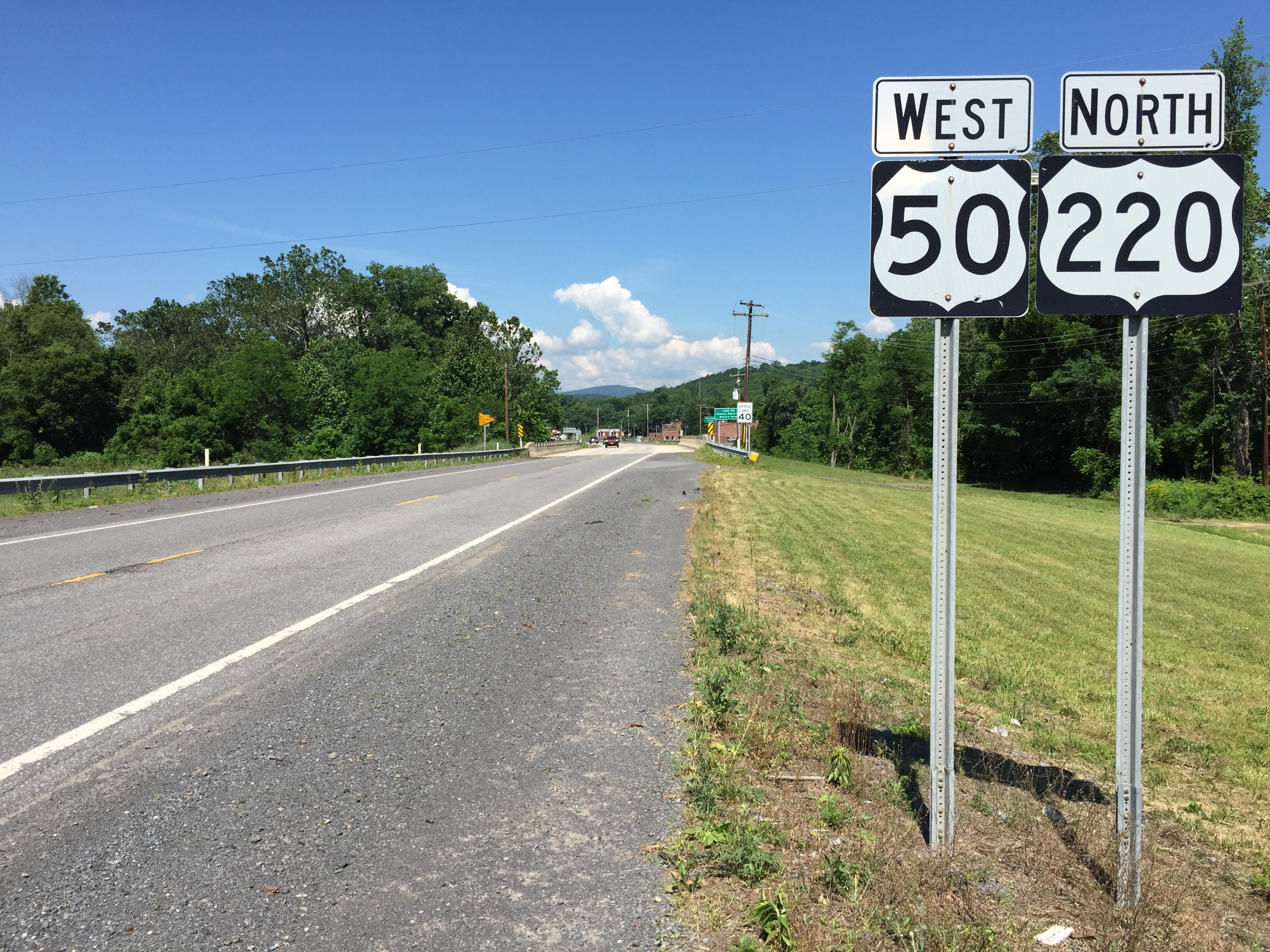
View west along US 50 and north along US 220 (Northwestern Pike) near Paterson Creek in Burlington, Mineral County

US 50 crosses back into West Virginia over the north bank of the Potomac River. After passing through Gormania, the highway continues through the forest, and runs concurrently with Route 42 from near Mount Storm to near Hartmansville. Near Claysville, the route intersects Route 93, and Route 972 intersect US 50 near New Creek. US 220 runs concurrently with US 50 through Ridgeville, Markwood, and Burlington. At Junction, US 220 splits off to the south, and Route 28 continues east with US 50 through Mechanicsburg and through the river plain. In the town of Romney, US 50 goes through downtown, while Route 28 continues north. The highway goes through Shanks and Frenchburg, as well as Augusta; Route 29 runs concurrently through Pleasantdale. US 50 continues east through Hanging Rock and Loom, crossing the Cacapon River in Capon Bridge. US 50 then continues into Virginia.

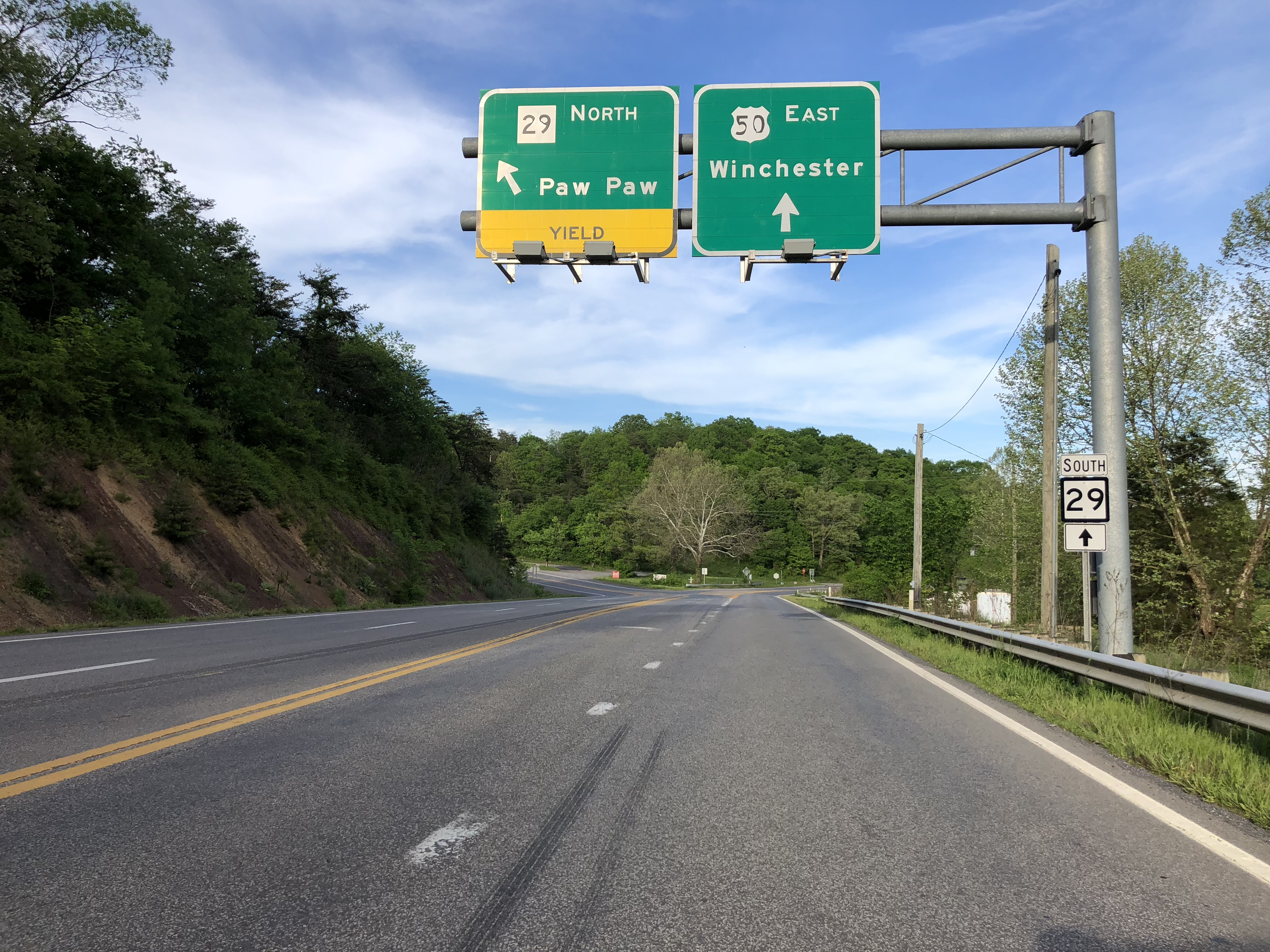
US 50 eastbound at WV 29 near Pleasantdale

== Water crossings ==
- Mill Branch east of Capon Bridge, West Virginia
- Cacapon River via Capon Bridge at Capon Bridge, West Virginia
- North River via Hanging Rock Bridge at Hanging Rock
- Tearcoat Creek via Pleasant Dale Bridge at Pleasant Dale
- North and South Forks of the Little Cacapon River at Frenchburg, West Virginia
- South Branch Potomac River via Romney Bridge at Romney
- Patterson Creek via USMC PFC Woodrow Wilson Barr Memorial Bridge at Burlington
- New Creek via New Creek Bridge at New Creek
- North Branch Potomac River via Gormania Bridge at the state line with Maryland
- Tygart Valley River via US 50 Bridge at Grafton
- West Fork River via US 50 Bridge at Clarksburg
- Ohio River via Blennerhassett Island Bridge at Parkersburg

== Historic sites ==
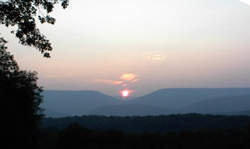
Saddle Mountain at sunrise, as viewed from Skyline atop the Allegheny Front along U.S. 50 in West Virginia

=== Mineral County ===
- Weaver's Antique Service Station
- Claysville Church
- Patterson Creek Manor
- Saddle Mountain
- Travelers Rest

=== Hampshire County ===
- Hook's Tavern, 1790
- Capon Bridge
  - Frye's Inn, c. 1800
  - Amos Pugh House
- Cooper Mountain Overlook
- Hanging Rock
- Straw's Country Store Museum
- Historic Downtown Romney
  - West Virginia Schools for the Deaf and Blind, 1846
  - Hampshire County Courthouse, 1922
  - Literary Hall, 1870
  - Indian Mound Cemetery
  - Mount Pisgah Benevolence Cemetery
- Fort Mill Ridge Civil War Trenches
- The Burg1, built c. 1769
- Sloan–Parker House (Stone House), built 1790

== Major intersections ==
County	Location	mi	km	Destinations	Notes
Wood				US 50 west to SR 7 / SR 32 – Athens, Belpre	Ohio state line (Blennerhassett Island Bridge over Ohio River)
Wood				WV 892 (Dupont Road) – Washington	interchange
Wood				CR 34/4 (River Hill Road)	interchange
Wood				WV 68 south – Ravenswood	interchange; west end of WV 68 overlap
Wood	Marrtown			CR 9 (Marrtown Road)	interchange
Wood				WV 68 north (Juliana Street) – Downtown Parkersburg	interchange; eastbound exit and westbound entrance; east end of WV 68 overlap
Wood	Parkersburg			WV 14 (Division Street) – Downtown Parkersburg	interchange
Wood				WV 47 (Staunton Avenue)	interchange
Wood				WV 618 (7th Street)	interchange
Wood				I-77 / WV 2 – Marietta, OH, Charleston	I-77 exit 176
Wood	Deerwalk			WV 31 north / CR 50/16 (Riser Ridge Road) – Deerwalk	west end of WV 31 overlap
Ritchie				WV 31 south – Cairo	east end of WV 31 overlap
Ritchie	Ellenboro			WV 16 – Ellenboro, Harrisville	interchange
Ritchie	Pennsboro			WV 74 – Pennsboro, Pullman	
Doddridge				WV 18 – West Union, Glenville	
Harrison				WV 23 – Alma, Salem, Fort New Salem, Salem International University	
Harrison	East Salem			Downtown Salem (CR 50/73)	interchange; westbound exit and eastbound entrance
Harrison	Clarksburg			US 19 / WV 20 (West Pike Street)	interchange
Harrison	Clarksburg			West Virginia Avenue / Sycamore Street	interchange
Harrison	Clarksburg			Chestnut Street	interchange
Harrison	Clarksburg			3rd Street / 2nd Street - Downtown Clarksburg	interchange
Harrison	Clarksburg			WV 20 (Joyce Street)	interchange
Harrison	Clarksburg			I-79 – Fairmont, Charleston	I-79 exit 119
Harrison	Bridgeport			WV 58 west (Virginia Avenue) to I-79	
Harrison	Bridgeport			WV 131 north (Benedum Drive) – Airport	
Harrison	Bridgeport			WV 76 east – Flemington	
Harrison	Bridgeport			WV 279 west to I-79	
Taylor				US 250 north – Fairmont	west end of US 250 overlap
Taylor	Pruntytown			US 250 south – Elkins	east end of US 250 overlap
Taylor	Grafton			WV 310 north – Valley Falls State Park	
Taylor	Grafton			US 119	
Preston				WV 92 north – Arthurdale, Reedsville	west end of WV 92 overlap
Preston				WV 92 south – Nestorville, Belington	east end of WV 92 overlap
Preston	Fellowsville			WV 26 north – Kingwood	
Preston	Macomber			WV 72 south – Parsons	west end of WV 72 overlap
Preston	Macomber			WV 72 north – Rowlesburg	east end of WV 72 overlap
Preston	Brookside			WV 24 south – Thomas	
Preston				US 50 east (George Washington Highway)	
US 50 passes through Maryland
Garrett	Gorman			US 50 west (George Washington Highway)	
North Branch Potomac River				Gormania Bridge	
Grant	Gormania			WV 90 south – Thomas	
Grant	Mount Storm			WV 42 south – Petersburg	west end of WV 42 overlap
Mineral				WV 42 north – Elk Garden, Jennings Randolph Lake	east end of WV 42 overlap
Mineral	Claysville			WV 93 west – Scherr	west end of WV 93 overlap
Mineral	New Creek			WV 93 east to US 220 north – Keyser	east end of WV 93 overlap
Mineral				US 220 north – Keyser	west end of US 220 overlap
Hampshire	Junction			US 220 south / WV 28 south – Moorefield	east end of US 220 overlap; west end of WV 28 overlap
Hampshire	Romney			WV 28 north	east end of WV 28 overlap
Hampshire				WV 29 north – Paw Paw	west end of WV 29 overlap
Hampshire				WV 29 south – Baker	east end of WV 29 overlap
Hampshire				US 50 east – Winchester	Virginia state line
1.000 mi = 1.609 km; 1.000 km = 0.621 mi: Concurrency terminus

U.S. Route 50
Previous state: Ohio	West Virginia	Next state: Maryland
Previous state: Maryland	West Virginia	Next state: Virginia
