= Bristol, West Virginia =

Unincorporated community in West Virginia, United States

- Unincorporated community
- Location within West Virginia Location within the United States
- Coordinates: 39°17′16″N 80°31′26″W
- Country: United States
- State: West Virginia
- County: Harrison
- Elevation: 1,027 ft (313 m)
- Time zone: UTC-5 (Eastern (EST))
  - Summer (DST): UTC-4 (EDT)
- Area codes: 304 & 681
- GNIS feature ID: 1553979

Bristol is an unincorporated community in Harrison County, West Virginia, United States. It is located along U.S. Route 50 1.9 miles (3.1 km) east-northeast of Salem. Bristol had a post office, which closed on October 1, 2005.

The community was settled by Seventh Day Baptists in the 1790s and originally called Cherry Camp Run. The current name is a transfer from Bristol, England.
