= Deerwalk, West Virginia =

Unincorporated community in West Virginia, United States

- Unincorporated community
- Location within West Virginia Location within the United States
- Coordinates: 39°15′14″N 81°19′40″W
- Country: United States
- State: West Virginia
- County: Wood
- Elevation: 925 ft (282 m)
- Time zone: UTC-5 (Eastern (EST))
  - Summer (DST): UTC-4 (EDT)
- Area codes: 304 & 681
- GNIS feature ID: 1554282

Deerwalk is an unincorporated community in Wood County, West Virginia, United States. Deerwalk is located on West Virginia Route 31 north of its junction with U.S. Route 50, 12.5 miles (20.1 km) east of Parkersburg.

The community was named for a deer trail near the original town site.
