= Claysville, West Virginia =

Unincorporated community in West Virginia, United States

Claysville
- Unincorporated community
- Location within the state of West Virginia Claysville (the United States)
- Coordinates: 39°20′56″N 79°03′23″W
- Country: United States
- State: West Virginia
- County: Mineral
- Elevation: 1,086 ft (331 m)
- Time zone: UTC-5 (Eastern (EST))
  - Summer (DST): UTC-4 (EDT)
- GNIS feature ID: 1537384

Claysville is an unincorporated community in Mineral County, West Virginia, United States, located at the intersection of West Virginia Route 93 and U.S. Route 50. It is part of the Cumberland, MD-WV Metropolitan Statistical Area.

The community bears the name of a pioneer settler.

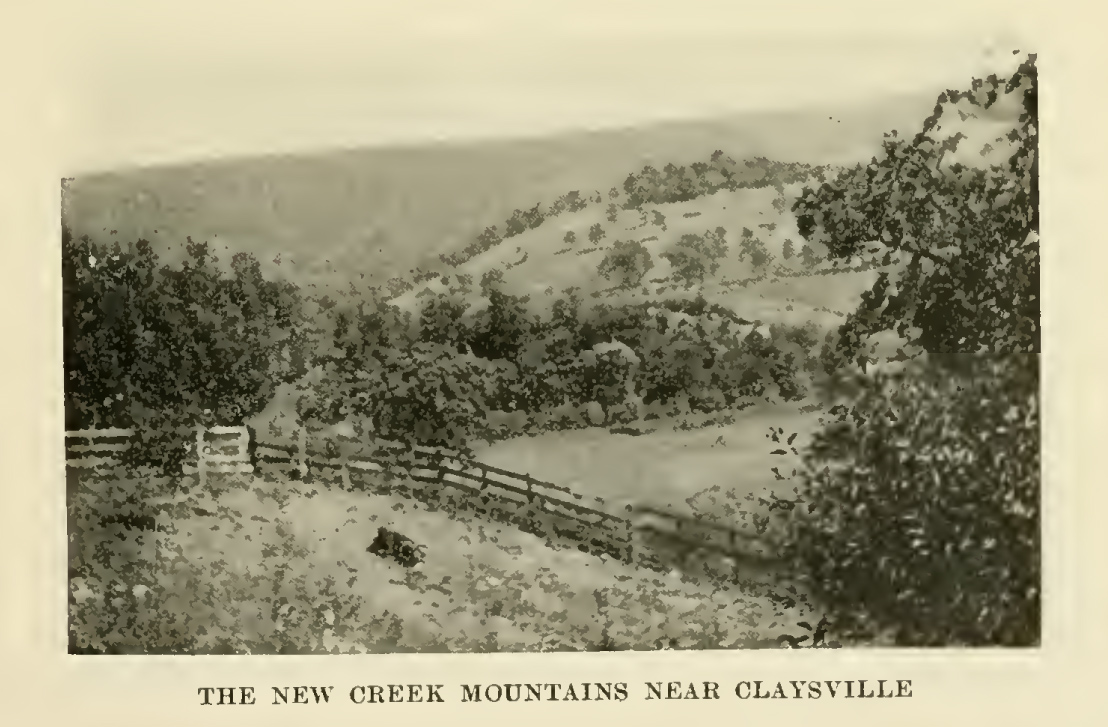
New Creek Mountain near Claysville, WV, circa 1908

== Historic sites ==
- Claysville Church
- Log House of Claysville
