= Williamstown Bridge =

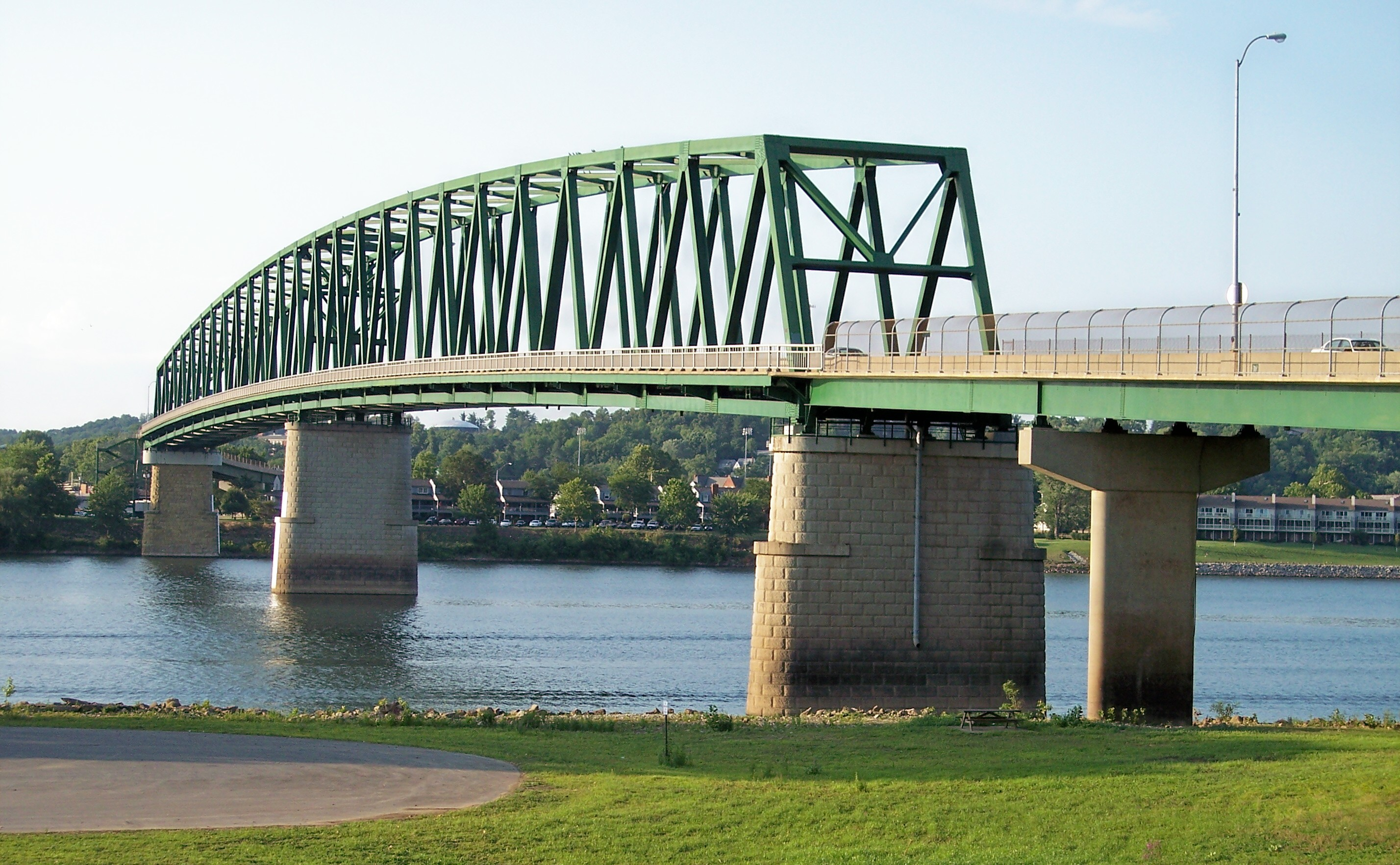
- Viewing the Williamstown Bridge from Williamstown, West Virginia.
- Coordinates: 39°24′30″N 81°26′52″W
- Carries: WV 31/ SR 60; 2 lanes plus sidewalk
- Crosses: Ohio River
- Locale: Williamstown, West Virginia
- Maintained by: West Virginia Department of Transportation

Characteristics
- Design: Steel Continuous Truss

History
- Opened: 1992

Location
- Interactive map of Williamstown Bridge

The Williamstown Bridge is a bridge over the Ohio River between Williamstown, West Virginia, and Marietta, Ohio. The bridge carries West Virginia Route 31 and Ohio State Route 60. U.S. Route 21 was also formerly routed along this bridge.

== Original bridge ==
The original bridge at this site was constructed in 1903. It was the first inland cantilever highway bridge in the United States and also site of the first strike, in 1902, by the United Steel Workers union.

== Current bridge ==
The current Williamstown Bridge was completed in 1992. It reuses some of the piers from the prior bridge, although the Marietta approaches were relocated to a new connection with Ohio State Route 7. This bridge is a continuous truss, the 28th-longest in North America.

== See also ==
- List of bridges documented by the Historic American Engineering Record in Ohio
- List of bridges documented by the Historic American Engineering Record in West Virginia
- List of crossings of the Ohio River
