= Claysville Church =

19th-century church in West Virginia, US

- Claysville Church
- 39.3425°N 79.0681°W
- Location: Claysville, Mineral County, West Virginia, U.S.

History
- Founded: 1850
- Founder(s): Daniel Hendrickson and John Fout

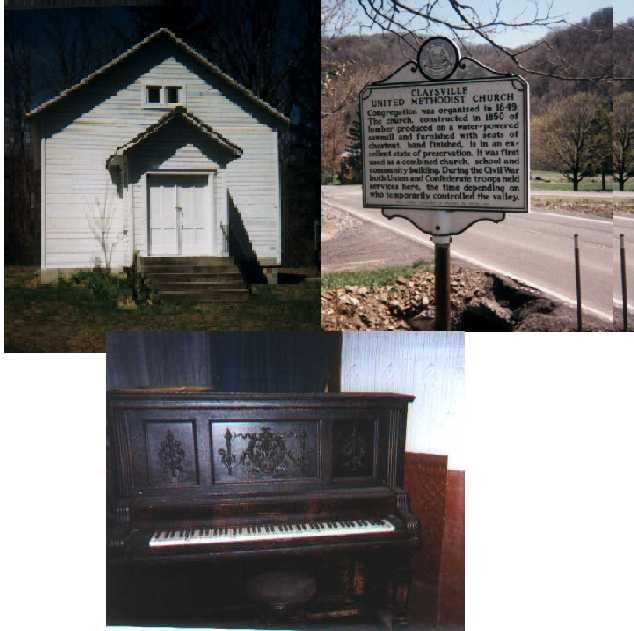
Pictures of the outside of the church, a sign beside the church, and a piano inside the church

Claysville Church is located at the intersection of the Northwestern Turnpike (now US 50) and WV 93 in Claysville, West Virginia, United States. It is the oldest organized rural church in Mineral County.

Claysville Church was built in 1850 under the direction of Daniel Hendrickson and William Fout, as a church of the Virginia Conference of the United Brethren Church. Reuben Davis and John Liller donated the land where the church is located on the spot where their separate property boundaries joined.

The church is made of lumber produced on a water-powered sawmill, and furnished with hand-finished seats. It is in an excellent state of preservation. It was first used as a combined church, school and community building.

Both Union and Confederate soldiers used the church for services during the Civil War. Due to frequent changes in control of the New Creek Valley between the Union and the Confederacy during the Civil War, soldiers from both armies worshipped at the church while under watch. Additionally, there is a cemetery with many graves sites behind the church.

When the Claysville United Methodist Church disbanded in 1869, its few remaining members had no choice but to look for affiliation elsewhere. The Claysville membership roll in 1860 shows more than 75 members, but there were only 13 when the congregation disbanded.

== History of United Brethren ==
In the local congregation voting in 1946, Claysville Church joined the Conference in forming the new Evangelical United Brethren Church (EUB), along with the Evangelical Church.

During the time of the 1946 merger, there were a total of 261 United Brethren churches in West Virginia, but only four congregations of the Evangelical Association. In 1968, the Methodists and the Evangelical United Brethren Church merged to establish the United Methodist Church, the largest Protestant organization in West Virginia. There were 240 EUB congregations in West Virginia at the time of the 1968 merger, and a total of 23,911 people were members. Today, 41.6% of the people in Mineral County are religious, with 16.3% being Methodist.

== Present ==
Mineral County Historical Society own the local church grounds. The Society meets at the church on the 4th Wednesday evening of every August. Additionally, Claysville Church is recognized by the WV Commission on Archives and History as a historical item. The church structure and interior fixtures are essentially as they were in the 1850s. The 1854 church Bible, roll books from 1856 to 1896, and other historic items are preserved.

Claysville Church is still being used for its annual Christmas program. Their program includes reading stories like "The Christmas Story", performing traditional carols like "O, Holy Night", and a candlelight service. The 2008 Claysville Church Christmas Program paid tribute to Jerry Shaver, an instrumental figure in the restoration of the church. The church is also available for weddings and gatherings; it seats 70–75 people.
