= New Creek =

Stream in eastern West Virginia, United States

Coordinates: 39°26′20″N 78°57′58″W

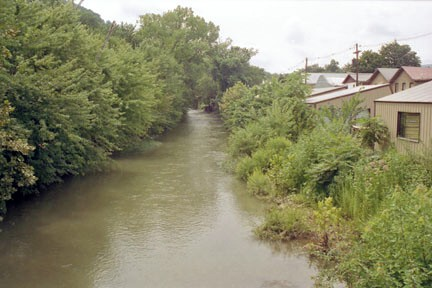
New Creek at Keyser, West Virginia in 1996

New Creek is an 18.4-mile-long (29.6 km) stream in eastern West Virginia, United States. It is the third major West Virginia tributary to the North Branch Potomac River. Via the Potomac, it is part of the watershed of the Chesapeake Bay.

== Course ==
New Creek rises on New Creek Mountain in northern Grant County and flows generally northeastwardly through western Mineral County, past the community of New Creek. It joins the North Branch of the Potomac at the city of Keyser.

== History ==
The creek was named after Peter New, an area pioneer.

== Tributaries ==
Tributary	Location
Thunderhill Run	Cross and Water Street Keyser
Stony Run	Stony Run Road & Harley O. Staggers Drive
Parr Spring Run	Mountain View Addition and US 220
Block Run	Valley View Addition and US 220
Hoffman Run	New Creek Firehall and WV 972
King Run	New Creek, WV at WV 972
Ash Spring Run	Ash Spring Run Road and US 50

== Bridges ==
Bridge	Route	Location
50/1 Bridge	County Road 50/1	4 miles south of New Creek
Claysville Bridge	WV 93	2 miles south of New Creek
Northwestern Turnpike Bridge	US 50	New Creek
US 50 to WV 972 Right Turn Bridge	WV 972	New Creek
Private Bridge	Driveway	New Creek
Private Bridge	Driveway	1/4 mile north of New Creek
Cut Off Road Bridge	US 220	1 mile north of New Creek
Spencers Bridge	Fairfax Stone Quarry Road	2.5 miles south of Keyser
Wimmer Farm Bridge	Wimmer Farm Road	2 miles south of Keyser
Harley O. Staggers Memorial Bridge	Staggers Lane	Keyser
Maryland Street Bridge	Maryland Street	Keyser
Willow Ave Bridge	Willow Ave	Keyser
Staff Sergeant Jonah Edward Kelley Bridge	WV 46	Keyser
B&O Railroad	B&O Main Line	Keyser

== See also ==
- List of West Virginia rivers
