= West Virginia Route 279 =

State highway in West Virginia, United States

West Virginia Route 279

Route information
- Maintained by WVDOH
- Length: 3.5 mi (5.6 km)
- Existed: 2002–present

Major junctions
- West end: CR 707 in Bridgeport
- I-79 in Bridgeport
- East end: US 50 in Bridgeport

Location
- Country: United States
- State: West Virginia

Highway system
- West Virginia State Highway System; Interstate; US; State
| ← WV 273 | → WV 305 |

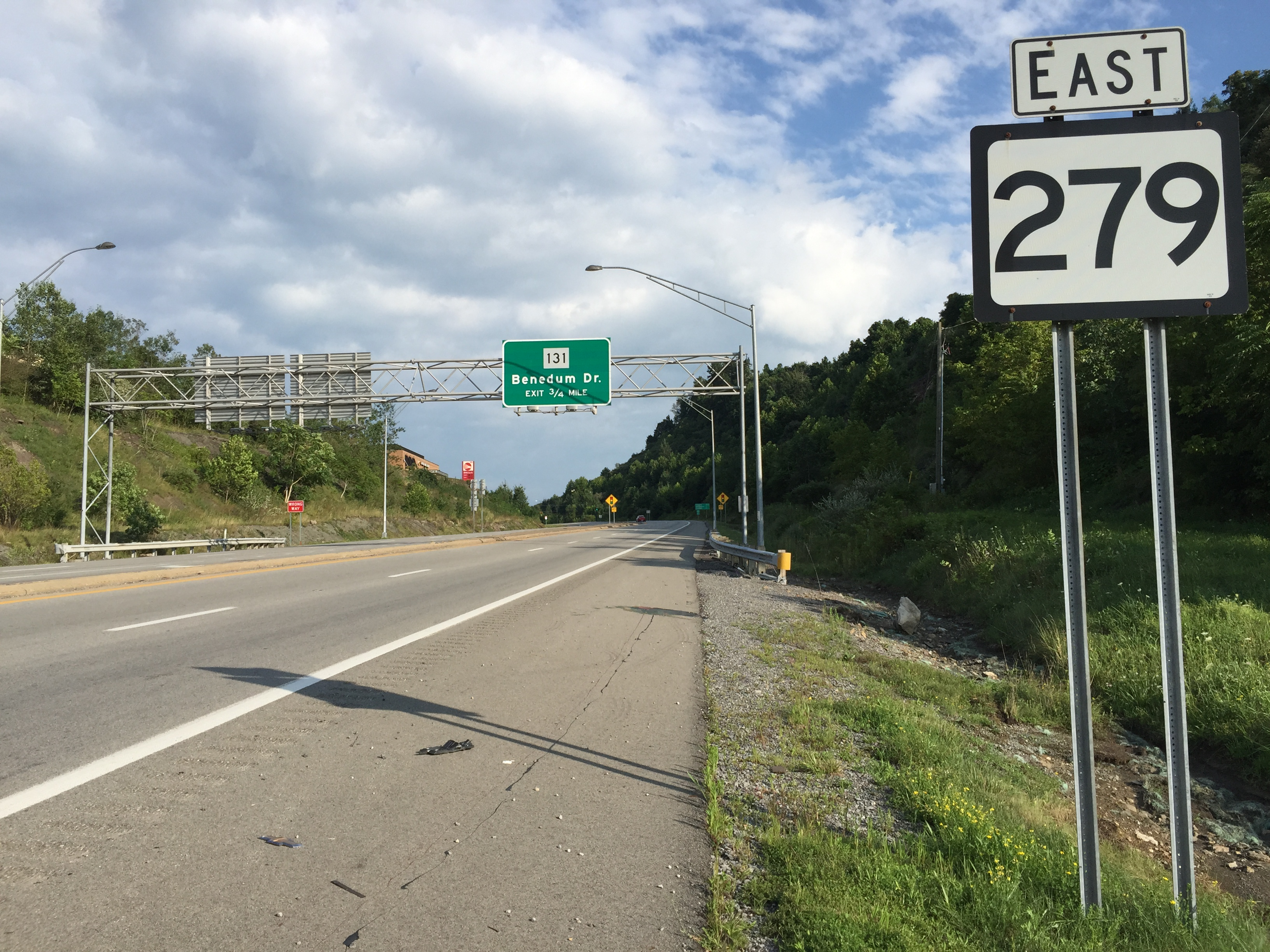
View east along WV 279 at I-79 in Bridgeport

West Virginia Route 279 is an east-west highway within the state of West Virginia. Its western terminus is at County Route 707, which leads to WV 131. Its eastern terminus is an interchange with US 50.

From east to west, the highway passes north of North Central West Virginia Airport before traveling through the Charles Pointe mixed-use master planned community. After intersecting Interstate 79, Route 279 passes near United Hospital Center, and its western terminus continues on to the FBI Criminal Justice Information Services Division campus.

== Major intersections ==
The entire route is in Bridgeport, Harrison County.

| mi | km | Destinations | Notes |
|---|---|---|---|
| | | CR 707 north – FBI Center, Shinnston | |
| | | I-79 – Clarksburg, Fairmont | I-79 exit 124 |
| | | WV 131 (Benedum Drive) – Airport | interchange |
| | | US 50 – Grafton, Bridgeport, Tygart Lake State Park | |
1.000 mi = 1.609 km; 1.000 km = 0.621 mi
