= East Salem, West Virginia =

Unincorporated community in West Virginia, United States

- Unincorporated community
- Location within West Virginia Location within the United States
- Coordinates: 39°17′20″N 80°32′10″W
- Country: United States
- State: West Virginia
- County: Harrison
- Elevation: 1,040 ft (320 m)
- Time zone: UTC-5 (Eastern (EST))
  - Summer (DST): UTC-4 (EDT)
- Area codes: 304 & 681
- GNIS feature ID: 1554355

East Salem is an unincorporated community in Harrison County, West Virginia, United States. East Salem is located along U.S. Route 50, 1 mile (1.6 km) east of Salem.
