= Ryanville, West Virginia =

Coordinates: 39°18′52″N 080°13′16″W

Location of Ryanville within West Virginia

Ryanville is a populated place in Harrison County, West Virginia, United States. It is served by ZIP code 26330 along with Bridgeport and Meadland.

== See also ==
- Bridgeport, West Virginia
