= Harper, Raleigh County, West Virginia =

Harper
- Unincorporated community
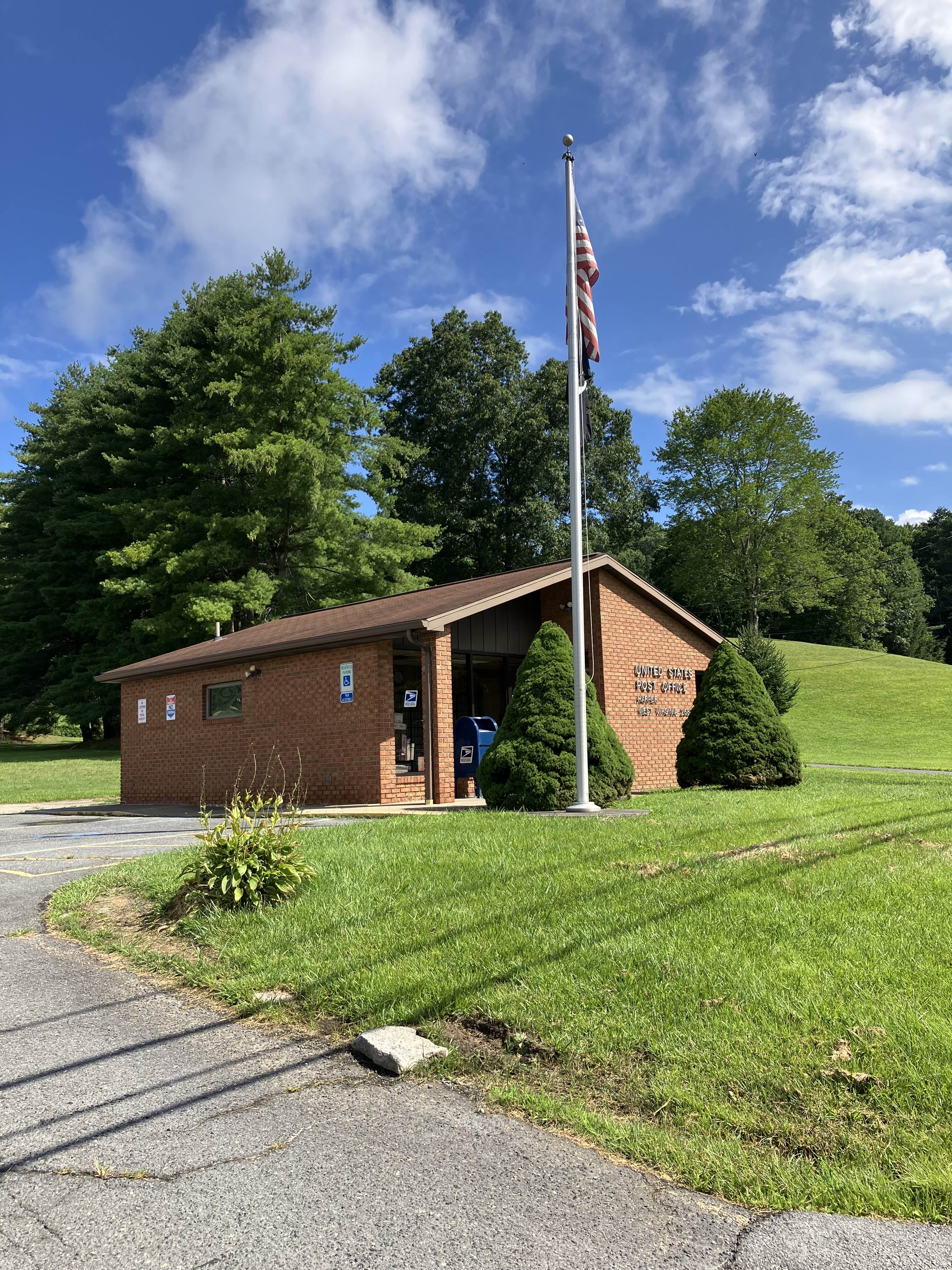
- Post office in Harper, West Virginia

- Location within the state of West Virginia Harper (the United States)
- Coordinates: 37°47′55″N 81°15′41″W
- Country: United States
- State: West Virginia
- County: Raleigh
- Elevation: 2,133 ft (650 m)
- Time zone: UTC-5 (Eastern (EST))
  - Summer (DST): UTC-4 (EDT)
- GNIS ID: 1558366

Harper was an unincorporated community in Raleigh County, West Virginia, United States.
