= Skyline, West Virginia =

Skyline
- Unincorporated community
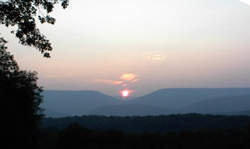
- Saddle Mountain as viewed at sunrise from Skyline, West Virginia

- Location within the state of West Virginia Skyline (the United States)
- Coordinates: 39°19′25″N 79°07′45″W
- Country: United States
- State: West Virginia
- County: Mineral
- Elevation: 2,727 ft (831 m)
- Time zone: UTC-5 (Eastern (EST))
  - Summer (DST): UTC-4 (EDT)
- GNIS feature ID: 1546877

Skyline is an unincorporated community in Mineral County, West Virginia, United States, located at the intersection of U.S. Route 50 and West Virginia Route 42 atop the Allegheny Front. Skyline is best known for its view of Saddle Mountain.
