= Kitzmiller, Maryland =

- Town
- Flag Coat of arms

- Location of Kitzmiller shown in Maryland
- Coordinates: 39°23′22″N 79°11′0″W
- Country: United States
- State: Maryland
- County: Garrett

Area
  - Total: 0.25 sq mi (0.65 km^{2})
  - Land: 0.22 sq mi (0.58 km^{2})
  - Water: 0.027 sq mi (0.07 km^{2})
- Elevation: 1,677 ft (511 m)

Population (2020)
  - Total: 300
  - Density: 1,349.0/sq mi (520.84/km^{2})
- Time zone: UTC-5 (Eastern (EST))
  - Summer (DST): UTC-4 (EDT)
- ZIP code: 21538
- Area codes: 301, 240
- FIPS code: 24-44450
- GNIS feature ID: 2391258
- Website: https://www.kitzmillermd.org

Kitzmiller is a town in Garrett County, Maryland, United States. As of the 2020 census, Kitzmiller had a population of 300.

== Geography ==
According to the United States Census Bureau, the town has a total area of 0.25 square miles (0.65 km^{2}), of which 0.22 square miles (0.57 km^{2}) is land and 0.03 square miles (0.08 km^{2}) is water.

== Demographics ==
Historical population
Census	Pop.	Note	%±
1910	865		—
1920	1,044		20.7%
1930	827		−20.8%
1940	870		5.2%
1950	652		−25.1%
1960	535		−17.9%
1970	443		−17.2%
1980	387		−12.6%
1990	275		−28.9%
2000	302		9.8%
2010	321		6.3%
2020	300		−6.5%
U.S. Decennial Census

=== 2010 census ===
As of the census of 2010, there were 321 people, 126 households, and 91 families living in the town. The population density was 1,459.1 inhabitants per square mile (563.4/km^{2}). There were 158 housing units at an average density of 718.2 units per square mile (277.3 units/km^{2}). The racial makeup of the town was 99.1% White, 0.3% Native American, and 0.6% from two or more races. Hispanic or Latino of any race were 0.3% of the population.

There were 126 households, of which 34.1% had children under the age of 18 living with them, 57.1% were married couples living together, 11.9% had a female householder with no husband present, 3.2% had a male householder with no wife present, and 27.8% were non-families. 23.0% of all households were made up of individuals, and 14.3% had someone living alone who was 65 years of age or older. The average household size was 2.55 and the average family size was 2.97.

The median age in the town was 40.4 years. 22.1% of residents were under the age of 18; 7.8% were between the ages of 18 and 24; 26.9% were from 25 to 44; 26% were from 45 to 64; and 17.4% were 65 years of age or older. The gender makeup of the town was 48.3% male and 51.7% female.

=== 2000 census ===
As of the census of 2000, there were 302 people, 127 households, and 91 families living in the town. The population density was 1,170.8 inhabitants per square mile (452.0/km^{2}). There were 155 housing units at an average density of 600.9 units per square mile (232.0 units/km^{2}). The racial makeup of the town was 99.67% White, and 0.33% from two or more races. Hispanic or Latino of any race were 0.33% of the population.

There were 127 households, out of which 36.2% had children under the age of 18 living with them, 50.4% were married couples living together, 14.2% had a female householder with no husband present, and 27.6% were non-families. 26.8% of all households were made up of individuals, and 21.3% had someone living alone who was 65 years of age or older. The average household size was 2.38 and the average family size was 2.83.

In the town, the population was spread out, with 25.2% under the age of 18, 6.6% from 18 to 24, 26.5% from 25 to 44, 21.5% from 45 to 64, and 20.2% who were 65 years of age or older. The median age was 39 years. For every 100 females, there were 86.4 males. For every 100 females age 18 and over, there were 89.9 males.

The median income for a household in the town was $25,000, and the median income for a family was $29,167. Males had a median income of $21,528 versus $16,563 for females. The per capita income for the town was $12,365. About 20.5% of families and 21.5% of the population were below the poverty line, including 31.7% of those under the age of eighteen and 13.7% of those 65 or over.

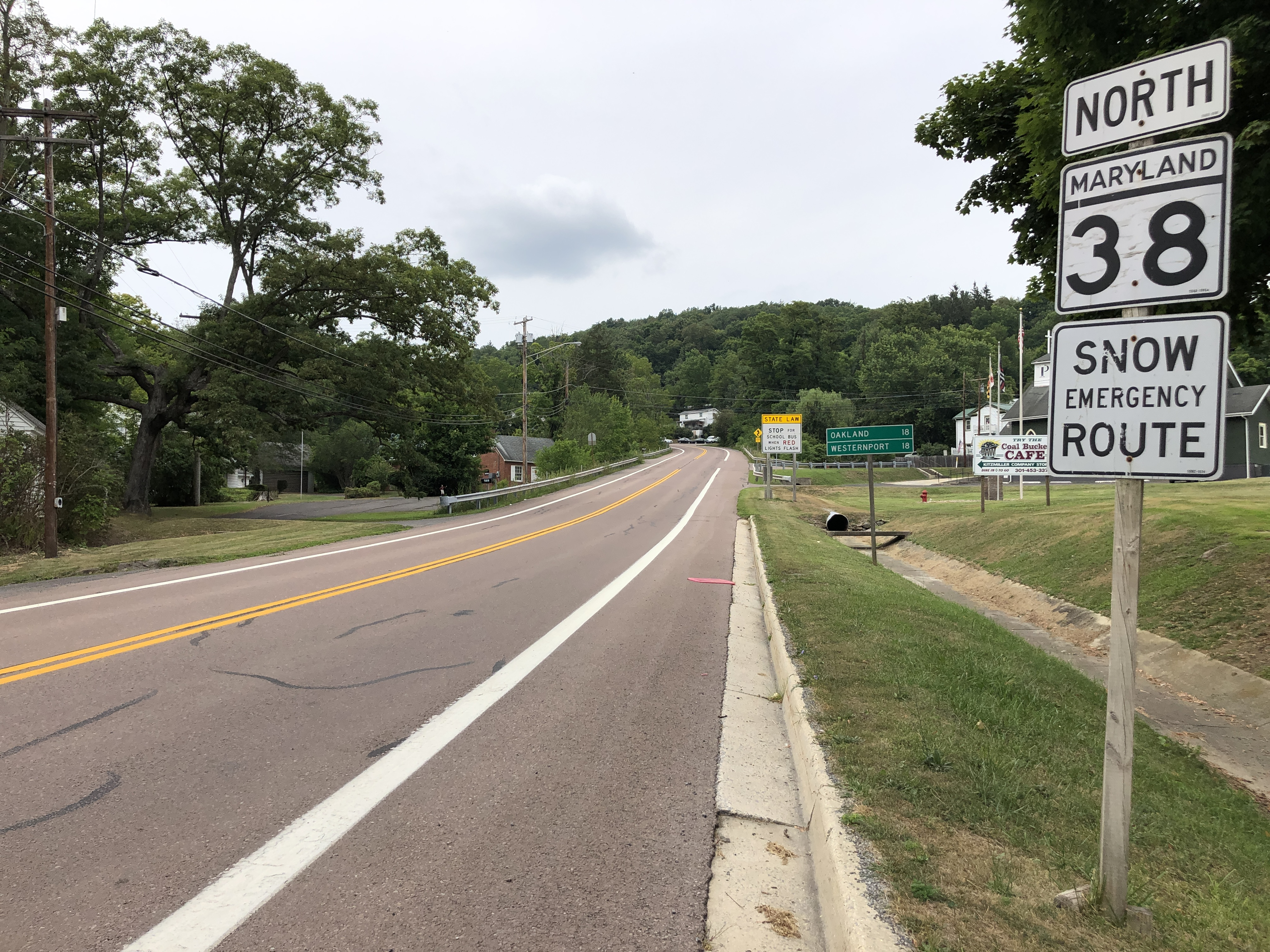
MD 38 northbound in Kitzmiller

== Transportation ==
The main method of transportation to and from Kitzmiller today is by road. Maryland Route 38 is the only state highway serving the town, connecting northward to Maryland Route 135 near Altamont and southward across the North Branch Potomac River to West Virginia Route 42 in Blaine.
