= Harper, Pendleton County, West Virginia =

Harper
- Unincorporated community
- Location within the state of West Virginia Harper (the United States)
- Coordinates: 38°31′10″N 79°28′17″W
- Country: United States
- State: West Virginia
- County: Pendleton
- Time zone: UTC-5 (Eastern (EST))
  - Summer (DST): UTC-4 (EDT)
- GNIS feature ID: 1549729

Harper is an unincorporated community on the South Branch Potomac River in Pendleton County, West Virginia, United States. Harper is located along U.S. Route 220.
