= Ellenboro, West Virginia =

- Town
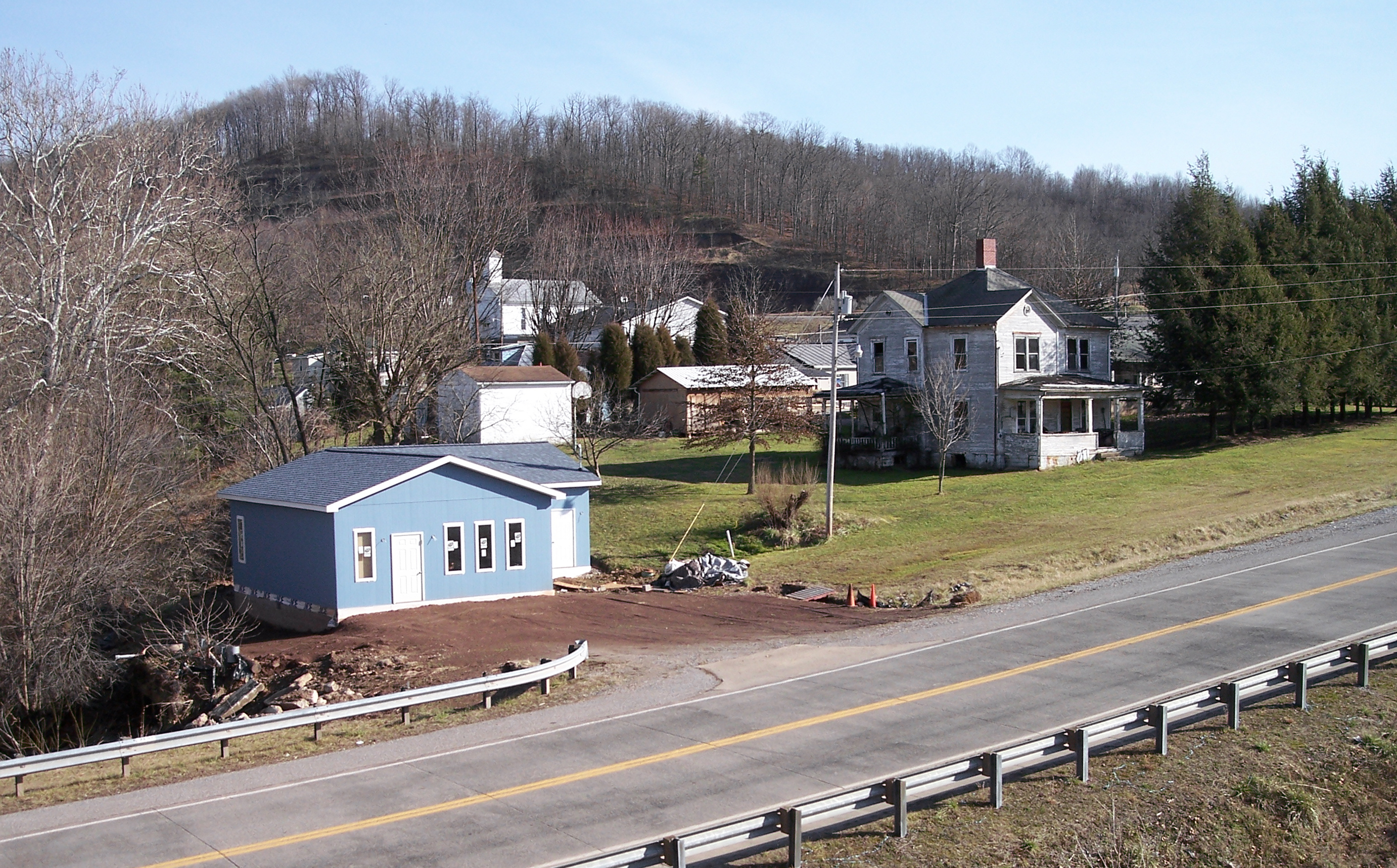
- Buildings along Route 16 in Ellenboro in 2007

- Location of Ellenboro in Ritchie County, West Virginia.
- Coordinates: 39°16′4″N 81°3′5″W
- Country: United States
- State: West Virginia
- County: Ritchie

Area
  - Total: 1.12 sq mi (2.91 km^{2})
  - Land: 1.12 sq mi (2.91 km^{2})
  - Water: 0 sq mi (0.00 km^{2})
- Elevation: 810 ft (247 m)

Population (2020)
  - Total: 221
  - Estimate (2021): 233
  - Density: 323/sq mi (124.6/km^{2})
- Time zone: UTC-5 (Eastern (EST))
  - Summer (DST): UTC-4 (EDT)
- ZIP code: 26346
- Area code: 304
- FIPS code: 54-24844
- GNIS feature ID: 1538665
- Website: local.wv.gov/Ellenboro/Pages/default.aspx

Ellenboro is a town in Ritchie County, West Virginia, United States. The population was 222 at the 2020 census. The town is located at the junction of U.S. Route 50 and West Virginia Route 16; the North Bend Rail Trail also passes through the town. The town was named for Ellen Mariah Williamson, the eldest daughter of the family that granted a right of way for the Baltimore and Ohio Railroad to build their line through the town; an earlier name for the community was Shumley. Ellenboro was incorporated in 1903.

== Geography ==
Ellenboro is located at 39°16′4″N 81°3′5″W (39.267702, -81.051299).

According to the United States Census Bureau, the town has a total area of 1.13 square miles (2.93 km^{2}), all land.

Hushers Run flows through the town.

== Demographics ==
Historical population
Census	Pop.	Note	%±
1910	204		—
1920	286		40.2%
1930	330		15.4%
1940	277		−16.1%
1950	307		10.8%
1960	340		10.7%
1970	267		−21.5%
1980	357		33.7%
1990	453		26.9%
2000	373		−17.7%
2010	363		−2.7%
2020	221		−39.1%
2021 (est.)	233	▲	5.4%
U.S. Decennial Census

Ellenboro once had a glass factory and at a much earlier time a very well known resort. However, both have ceased operation. The town was created in the early 1900s and was named after the postmaster's daughter.

=== 2010 census ===
As of the census of 2010, there were 363 people, 160 households, and 109 families living in the town. The population density was 321.2 inhabitants per square mile (124.0/km^{2}). There were 179 housing units at an average density of 158.4 per square mile (61.2/km^{2}). The racial makeup of the town was 100.0% White.

There were 160 households, of which 24.4% had children under the age of 18 living with them, 49.4% were married couples living together, 13.8% had a female householder with no husband present, 5.0% had a male householder with no wife present, and 31.9% were non-families. 28.8% of all households were made up of individuals, and 10% had someone living alone who was 65 years of age or older. The average household size was 2.27 and the average family size was 2.69.

The median age in the town was 48.4 years. 19.3% of residents were under the age of 18; 6.3% were between the ages of 18 and 24; 20% were from 25 to 44; 39.3% were from 45 to 64; and 14.9% were 65 years of age or older. The gender makeup of the town was 54.5% male and 45.5% female.

=== 2000 census ===
As of the census of 2000, there were 373 people, 158 households, and 103 families living in the town. The population density was 477.0 inhabitants per square mile (184.2/km^{2}). There were 181 housing units at an average density of 231.5 per square mile (89.4/km^{2}). The racial makeup of the town was 98.66% White, 0.27% African American, and 1.07% from two or more races.

There were 158 households, out of which 27.8% had children under the age of 18 living with them, 49.4% were married couples living together, 12.7% had a female householder with no husband present, and 34.2% were non-families. 27.8% of all households were made up of individuals, and 14.6% had someone living alone who was 65 years of age or older. The average household size was 2.36 and the average family size was 2.89.

In the town, the population was spread out, with 19.3% under the age of 18, 11.8% from 18 to 24, 28.4% from 25 to 44, 26.8% from 45 to 64, and 13.7% who were 65 years of age or older. The median age was 41 years. For every 100 females, there were 97.4 males. For every 100 females age 18 and over, there were 91.7 males.

The median income for a household in the town was $22,500, and the median income for a family was $26,563. Males had a median income of $21,111 versus $20,417 for females. The per capita income for the town was $17,418. About 26.7% of families and 30.7% of the population were below the poverty line, including 49.3% of those under age 18 and 18.0% of those age 65 or over.
