= New Creek, West Virginia =

New Creek
- Unincorporated community
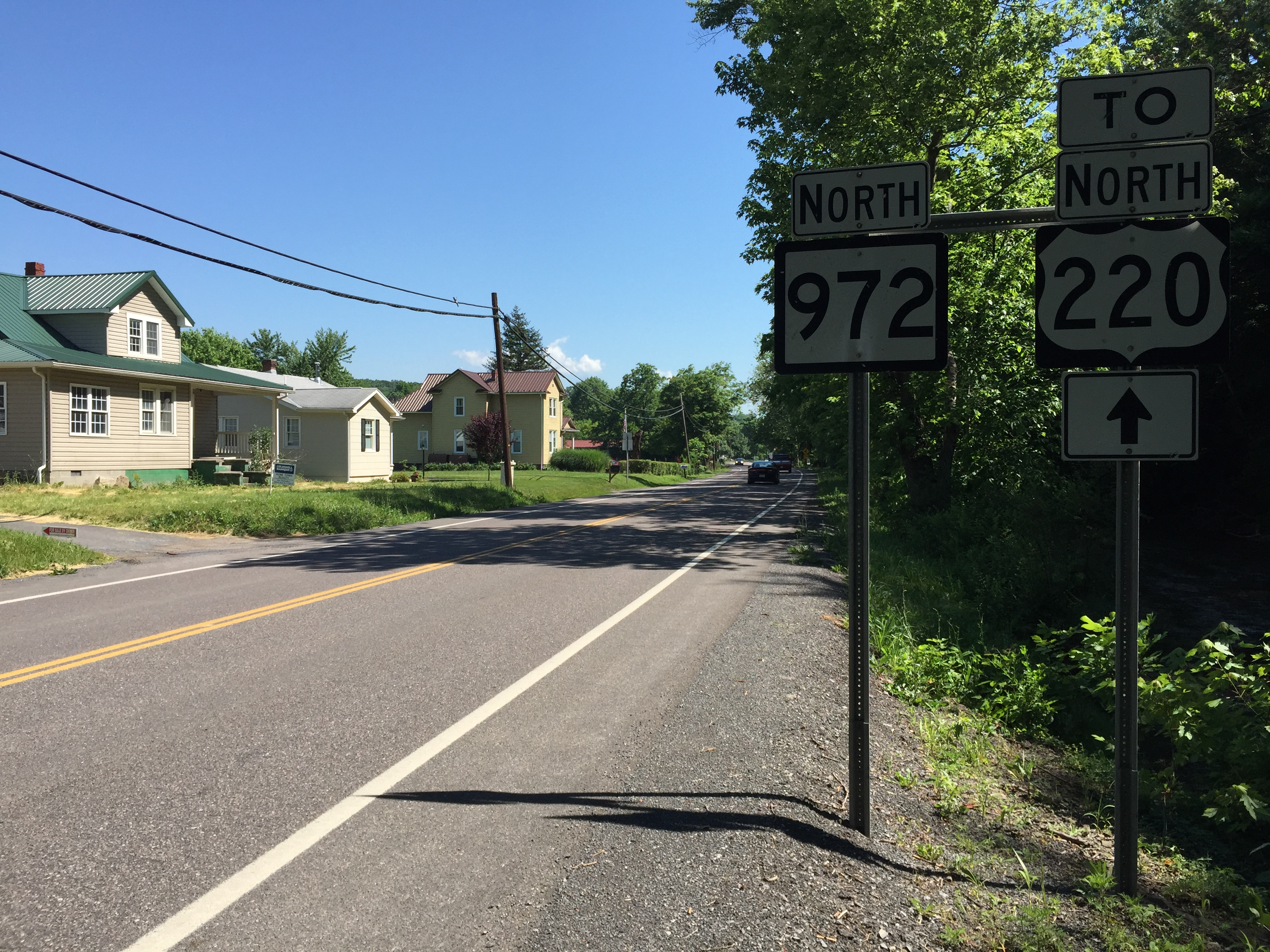
- West Virginia Route 972 in New Creek

- Location within the state of West Virginia New Creek (the United States)
- Coordinates: 39°22′30″N 79°1′36″W
- Country: United States
- State: West Virginia
- County: Mineral
- Elevation: 988 ft (301 m)
- Time zone: UTC-5 (Eastern (EST))
  - Summer (DST): UTC-4 (EDT)
- ZIP codes: 26743
- GNIS feature ID: 1555204

New Creek is an unincorporated community in Mineral County, West Virginia, United States. It lies near the intersection of New Creek and U.S. Route 50, and is 6 miles (9.7 km) south of Keyser. The ZIP code for New Creek is 26743.

During the Civil War, this community was the site of a military skirmish between Union and Confederate troops on June 19, 1861.
