= Scherr, West Virginia =

- Unincorporated community
- Location within West Virginia Location within the United States
- Coordinates: 39°11′35″N 79°10′12″W
- Country: United States
- State: West Virginia
- County: Grant
- Time zone: UTC-5 (Eastern (EST))
  - Summer (DST): UTC-4 (EDT)

Scherr is an unincorporated community in Grant County, West Virginia, United States. The community's name is pronounced like "sheer." Scherr lies to the west of the community of Greenland at the crossroads of West Virginia Route 42, West Virginia Route 93, and U.S. Route 48 (Corridor H). Scherr is home to a rock quarry, asphalt plant, and a small shut down country store.

The Scherr Formation is named after this town, and the type locality of the formation is here.

The community was named after Arnold C. Scherr, a state official who was instrumental in securing a post office for the town.
