= Mount Storm, West Virginia =

- Unincorporated community
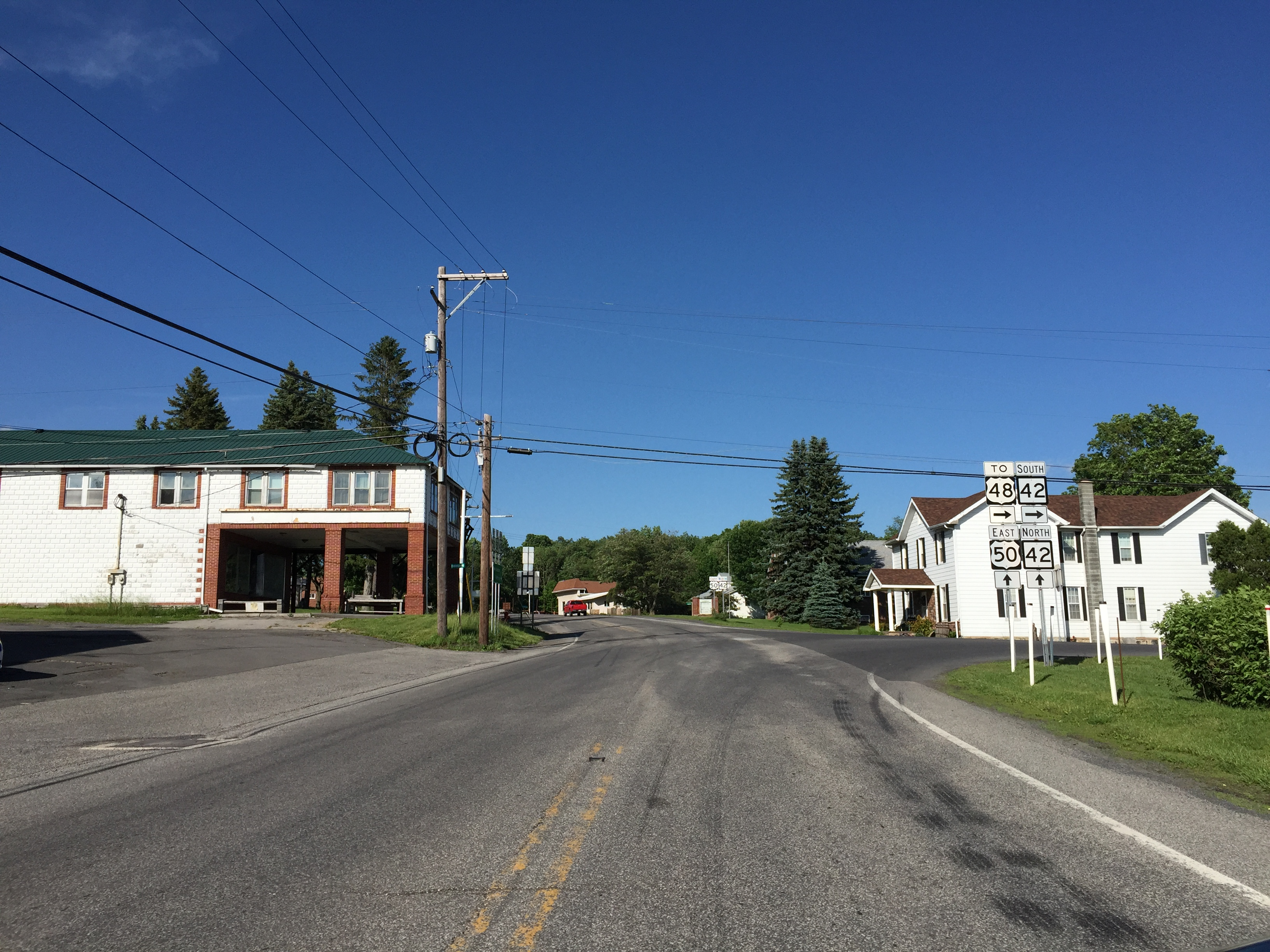
- View east along US 50 entering Mount Storm

- Location within West Virginia Location within the United States
- Coordinates: 39°16′38″N 79°14′27″W
- Country: United States
- State: West Virginia
- County: Grant

Population (2000)
  - Total: 109
- Time zone: UTC-5 (Eastern (EST))
  - Summer (DST): UTC-4 (EDT)
- ZIP code: 26739
- GNIS feature ID: 1543766

Mount Storm is an unincorporated community in Grant County, West Virginia, United States. Mount Storm lies on the Northwestern Turnpike (U.S. Route 50) at its junction with West Virginia Route 42. The community is the site of the Union School Complex, which contains Union High School.

Inclement weather over a nearby mountain caused the name of the town to be selected.

== Climate ==
The climate in this area has mild differences between highs and lows, and there is adequate rainfall year-round. According to the Köppen Climate Classification system, Mount Storm has a marine west coast climate, abbreviated "Cfb" on climate maps.
