= West Virginia Route 42 =

State highway in West Virginia, United States

West Virginia Route 42

Route information
- Maintained by WVDOH
- Length: 40.7 mi (65.5 km)

Major junctions
- South end: WV 28 / WV 55 in Petersburg
- WV 93 concurrent near Scherr; US 50 concurrent Mt. Storm to Hartmansville
- North end: MD 38 in Blaine

Location
- Country: United States
- State: West Virginia
- Counties: Grant, Mineral

Highway system
- West Virginia State Highway System; Interstate; US; State
← WV 41	→ WV 43

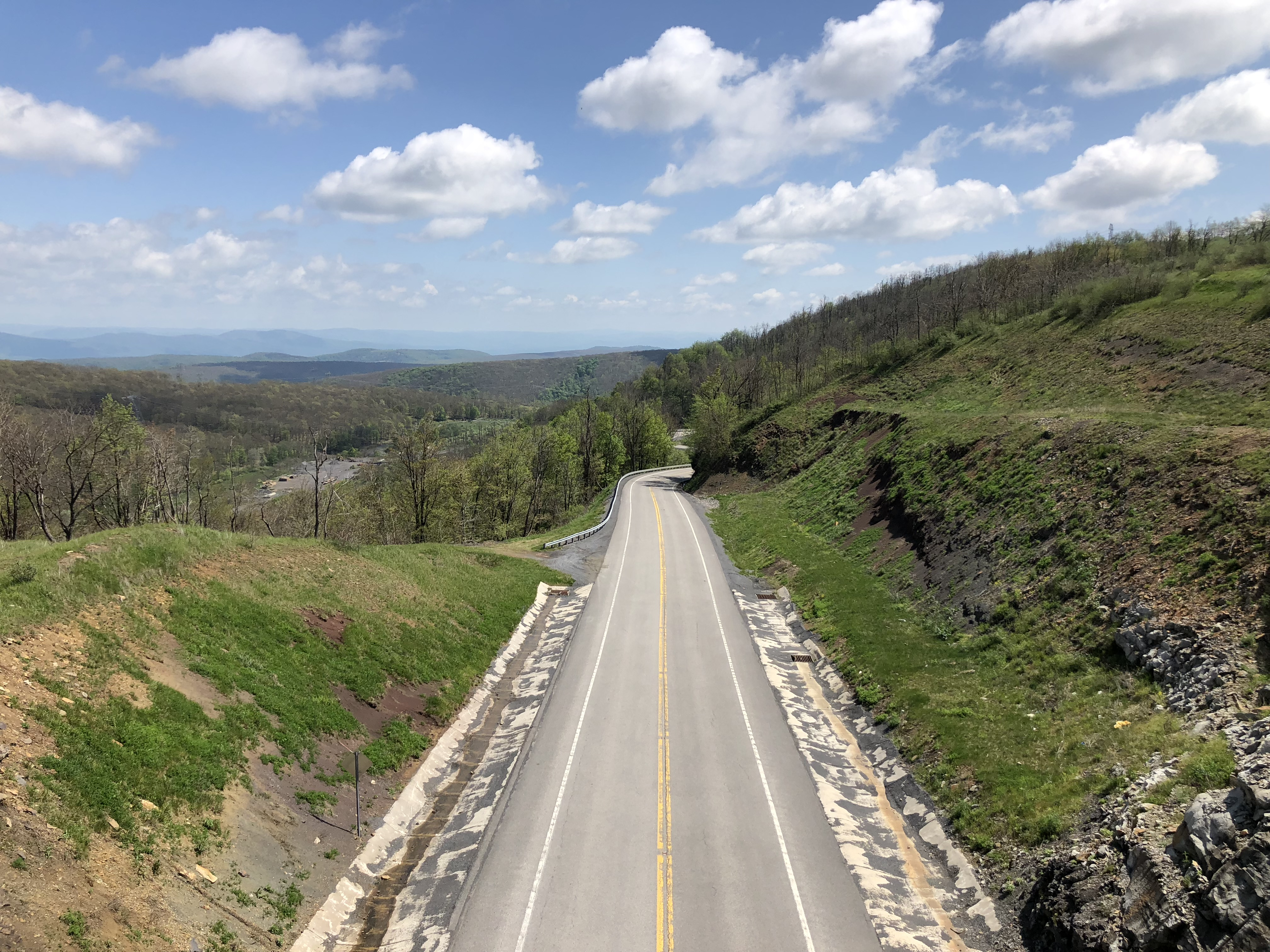
WV 42 and WV 93 descend the Allegheny Front between Bismarck and Scherr together

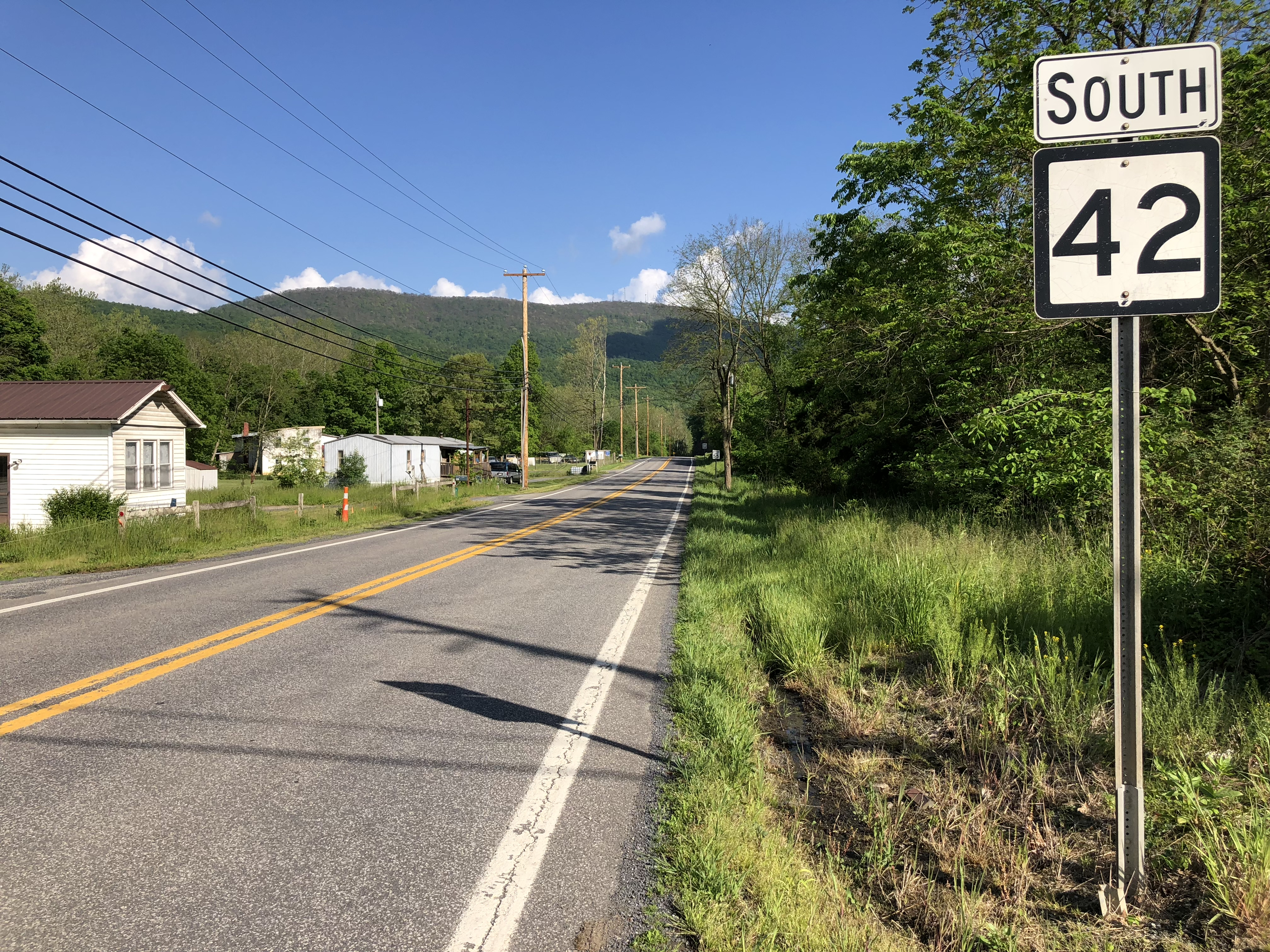
View south along WV 42 in Arthur

West Virginia Route 42 is a north–south state highway connecting Grant County to Mineral County in West Virginia's Eastern Panhandle. The southern terminus of the route is at West Virginia Route 28 and West Virginia Route 55 in Petersburg. The northern terminus is at the Maryland state line in Blaine, where WV 42 becomes Maryland Route 38 upon crossing the North Branch of the Potomac River.

WV 42 runs concurrent with West Virginia Route 93 upon descending the Allegheny Front, and also with U.S. Route 50 between Mount Storm and Skyline, where WV 42 turns left towards Elk Garden.

== Major intersections ==
County	Location	mi	km	Destinations	Notes
Grant	Petersburg			WV 28 / WV 55 – Moorefield, Seneca Rocks	
Grant	Scherr			WV 93 east – Keyser	south end of WV 93 overlap
Grant				WV 93 west – Davis, State Parks	north end of WV 93 overlap
Grant	Mount Storm			US 50 west – Grafton	south end of US 50 overlap
Mineral	Skyline			US 50 east – Romney	north end of US 50 overlap
Mineral				WV 46 east – Jennings Randolph Lake	intersection is just south of Elk Garden
Mineral				MD 38 north – Kitzmiller	Maryland state line (Kitzmiller Bridge over North Branch Potomac River)
1.000 mi = 1.609 km; 1.000 km = 0.621 mi: Concurrency terminus
