= Mill Creek (South Branch Potomac River tributary) =

Tributary stream of the South Branch Potomac River in West Virginia

Coordinates: 39°20′08″N 78°47′04″W

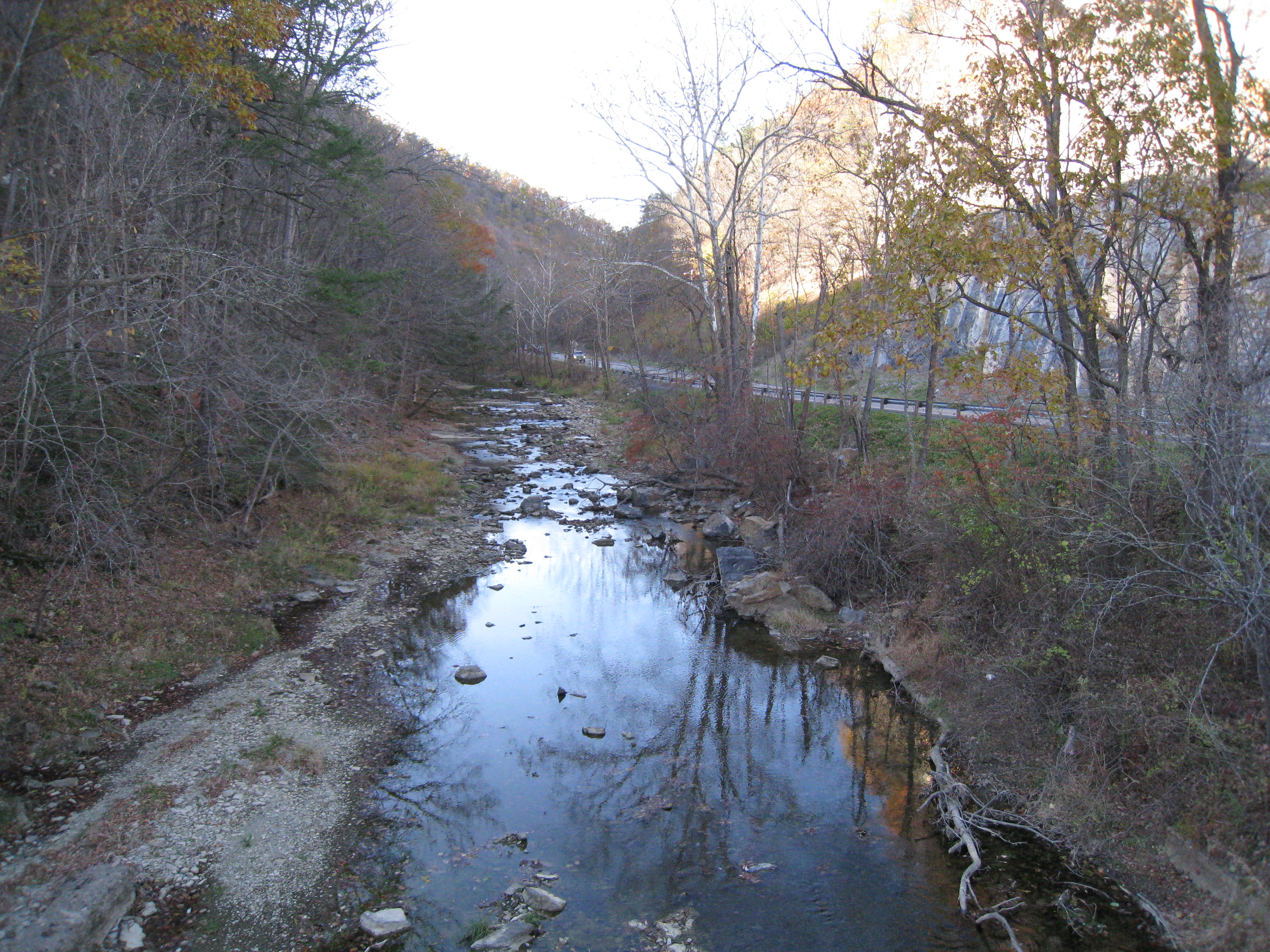
Mill Creek at Mechanicsburg Gap viewed from the Core Road (County Route 50/53) bridge near Romney

Mill Creek is a 14.0-mile-long (22.5 km) tributary stream of the South Branch Potomac River, belonging to the Potomac River and Chesapeake Bay watersheds. The stream is located in Hampshire County in West Virginia's Eastern Panhandle. Mill Creek flows into the South Branch west of Romney Bridge near Vanderlip along the Northwestern Turnpike (U.S. Route 50).

== Headwaters and course ==
Mill Creek's source lies in a hollow along Patterson Creek Mountain (2641 feet) in the extreme southwestern corner of Hampshire County near the "four corners" (where Mineral, Hampshire, Hardy, and Grant counties touch). At a confluence with Elmlick Run north of Purgitsville, Mill Creek flows northward parallel to U.S. Route 220/West Virginia Route 28 through the community of Rada. Continuing to follow U.S. Route 220/W.V. Route 28 north, Mill Creek curves eastward at Junction after flowing under U.S. Route 50. East of Junction, the creek runs by the Sloan–Parker House and continues northeastward with Mill Creek Mountain (2119 feet) bounding it to its east and Patterson Creek Mountain to its west. At Mechanicsburg, Mill Creek increases in size as it is joined by Titus Run, Sugar Run, and Dumpling Run. The wider stream makes a ninety degree turn in front of The Burg and enters Mechanicsburg Gap through Mill Creek Mountain. Mechanicsburg Gap is notable because of its many springs and the natural gateway it created for pioneers and settlers heading further west during the mid-18th century. Nearby overlooking Mill Creek and the South Branch are the Fort Mill Ridge Civil War Trenches on Mill Creek Mountain, south of the gap. At the hanging rocks at Phoenix Curve on U.S. Route 50, Mill Creek winds northward towards Vanderlip where it passes under a South Branch Valley Railroad wooden train trestle and joins the South Branch.

== Trout fishing ==
Mill Creek is stocked with rainbow trout from its mouth on the South Branch to Junction. The stream is stocked once in February and once every two weeks from March through May by the West Virginia Division of Natural Resources.

== Bridges ==
Bridge	Route	Location
Bridge at Purgitsville	US 220/WV 28	Purgitsville
Trinity Road Bridge	Trinity Road (CR 220/11)	Junction
Bridge at Junction	Northwestern Turnpike (US 50/WV 28)	Junction
Mechanicsburg Straight-Away Bridge	Northwestern Turnpike (US 50/WV 28)	Mechanicsburg
Phoenix Curve Bridge	Core Road (CR 50/53)	Mechanicsburg
Mill Meadow Wooden Tressel	South Branch Valley Railroad	Vanderlip

== Tributaries ==
Tributary streams are listed in order from south to north.

- Elmlick Run
- Camp Run
- Horselick Run
- Titus Run
- Sugar Run
- Dumpling Run
  - Mayhew Run
  - Long Meadow Run
- Core Run

== Image gallery ==
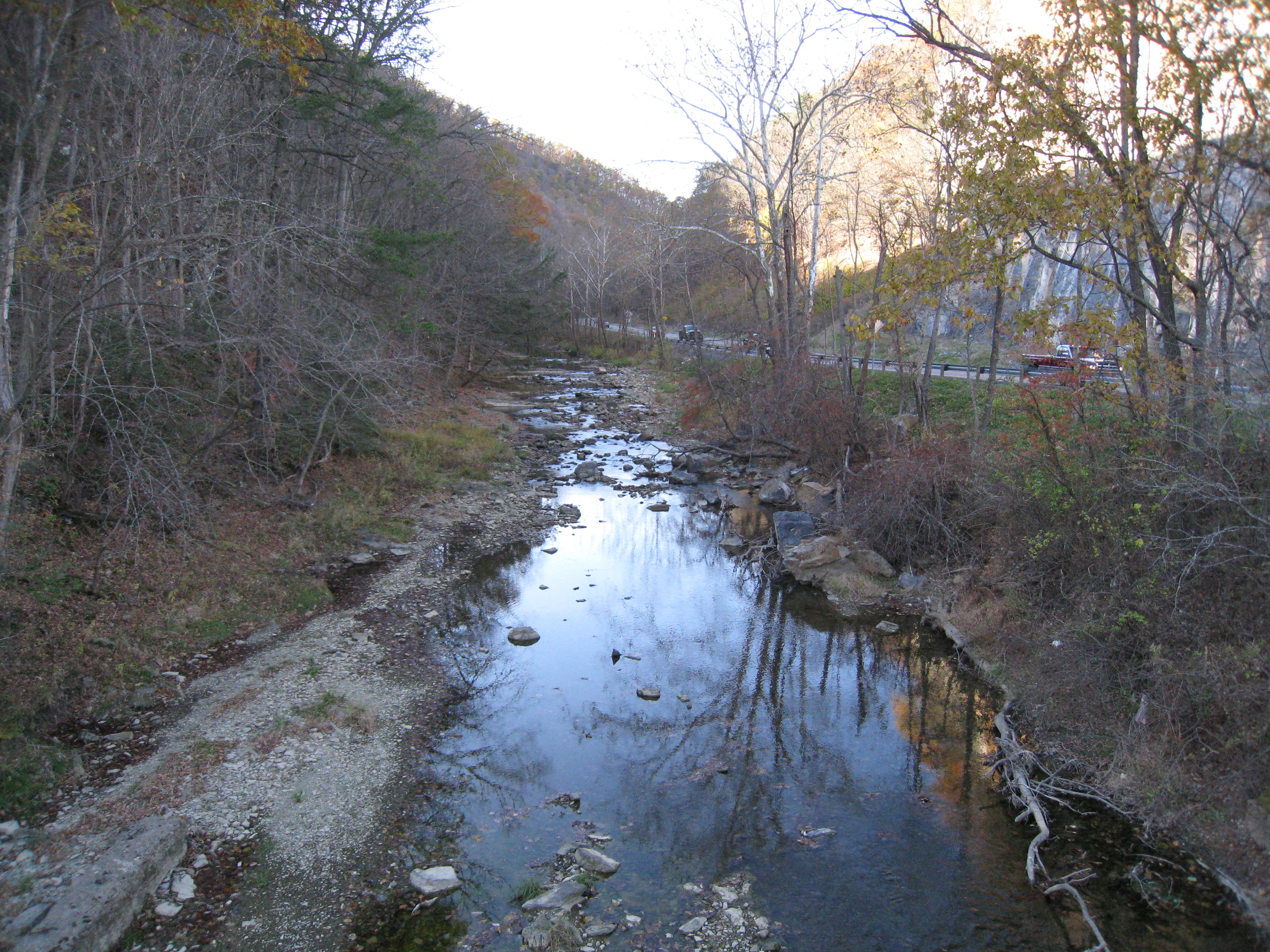
Mill Creek at Mechanicsburg Gap viewed from the Core Road (County Route 50/53) bridge near Romney

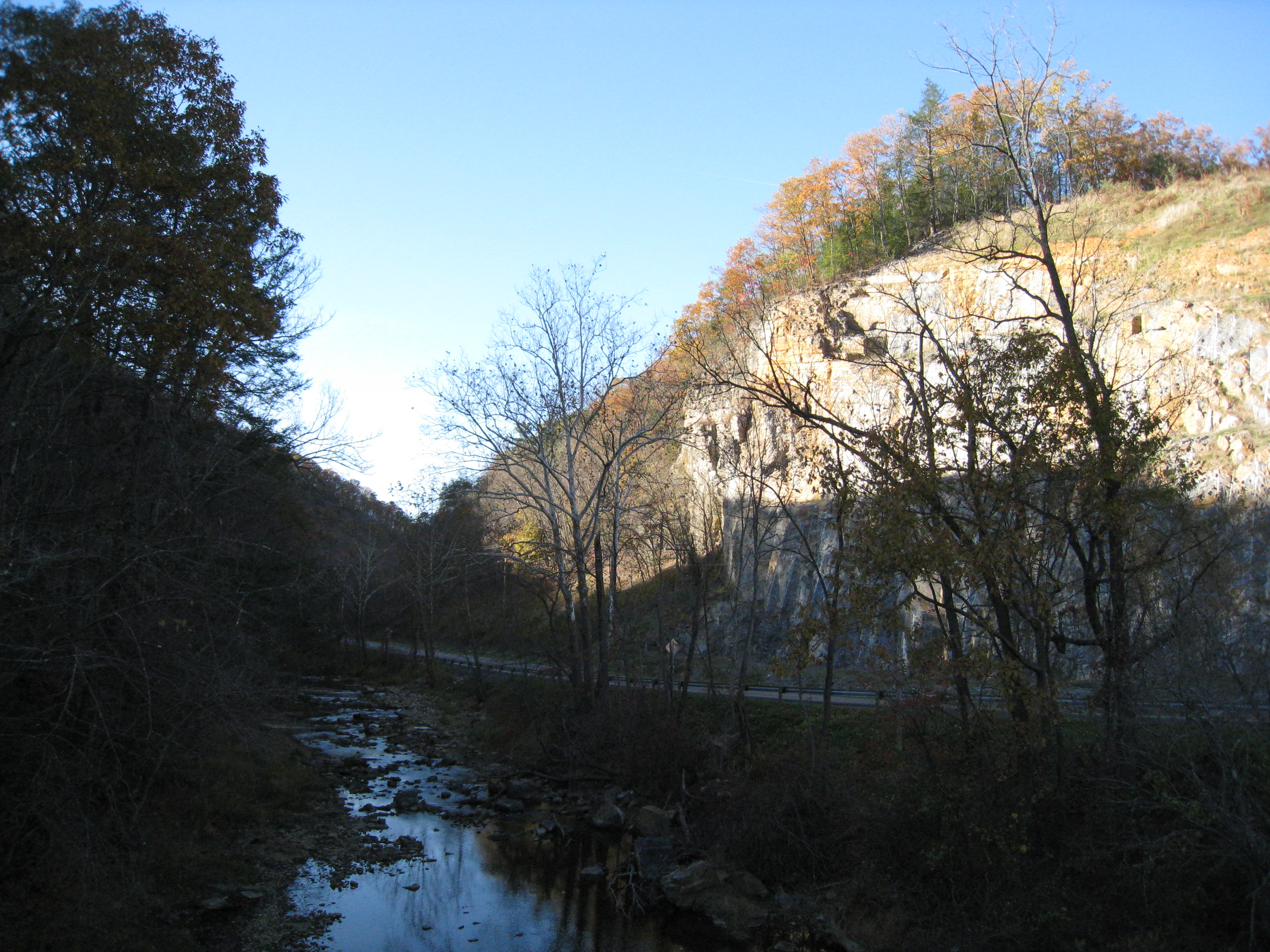
Mill Creek at Mechanicsburg Gap viewed from the Core Road (County Route 50/53) bridge near Romney

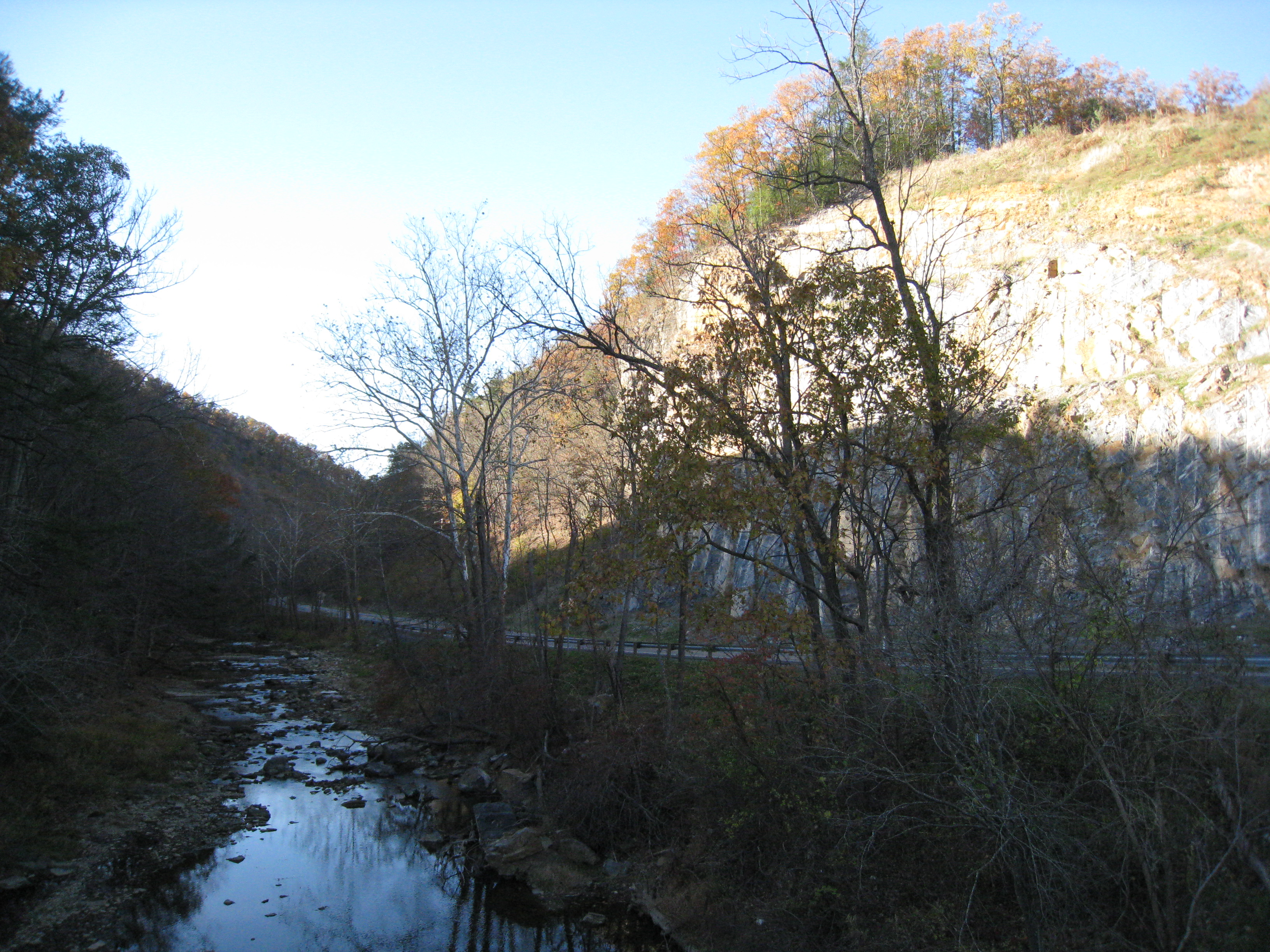
Mill Creek at Mechanicsburg Gap viewed from the Core Road (County Route 50/53) bridge near Romney

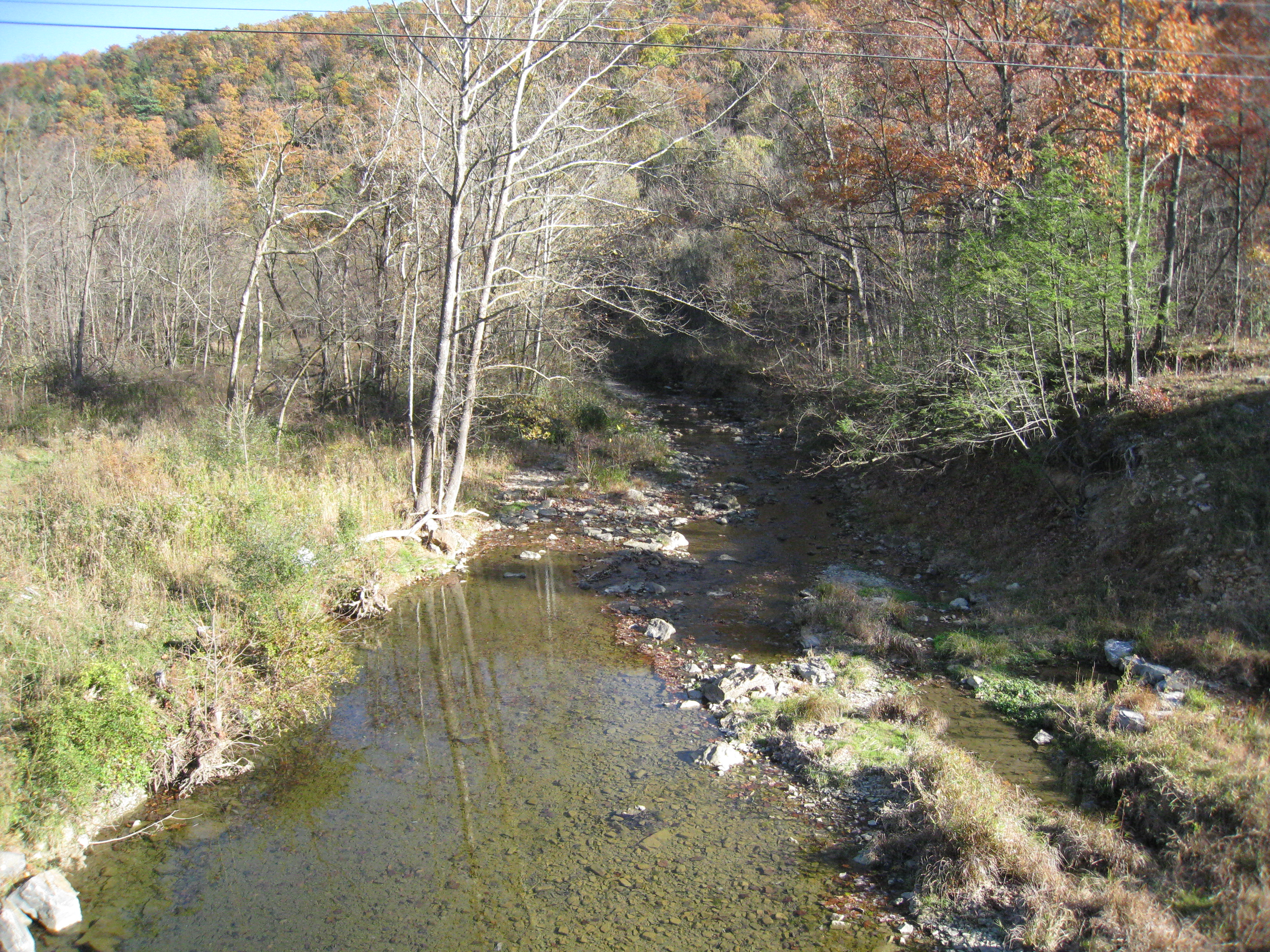
Mill Creek at Mechanicsburg Gap viewed from the Core Road (County Route 50/53) bridge near Romney

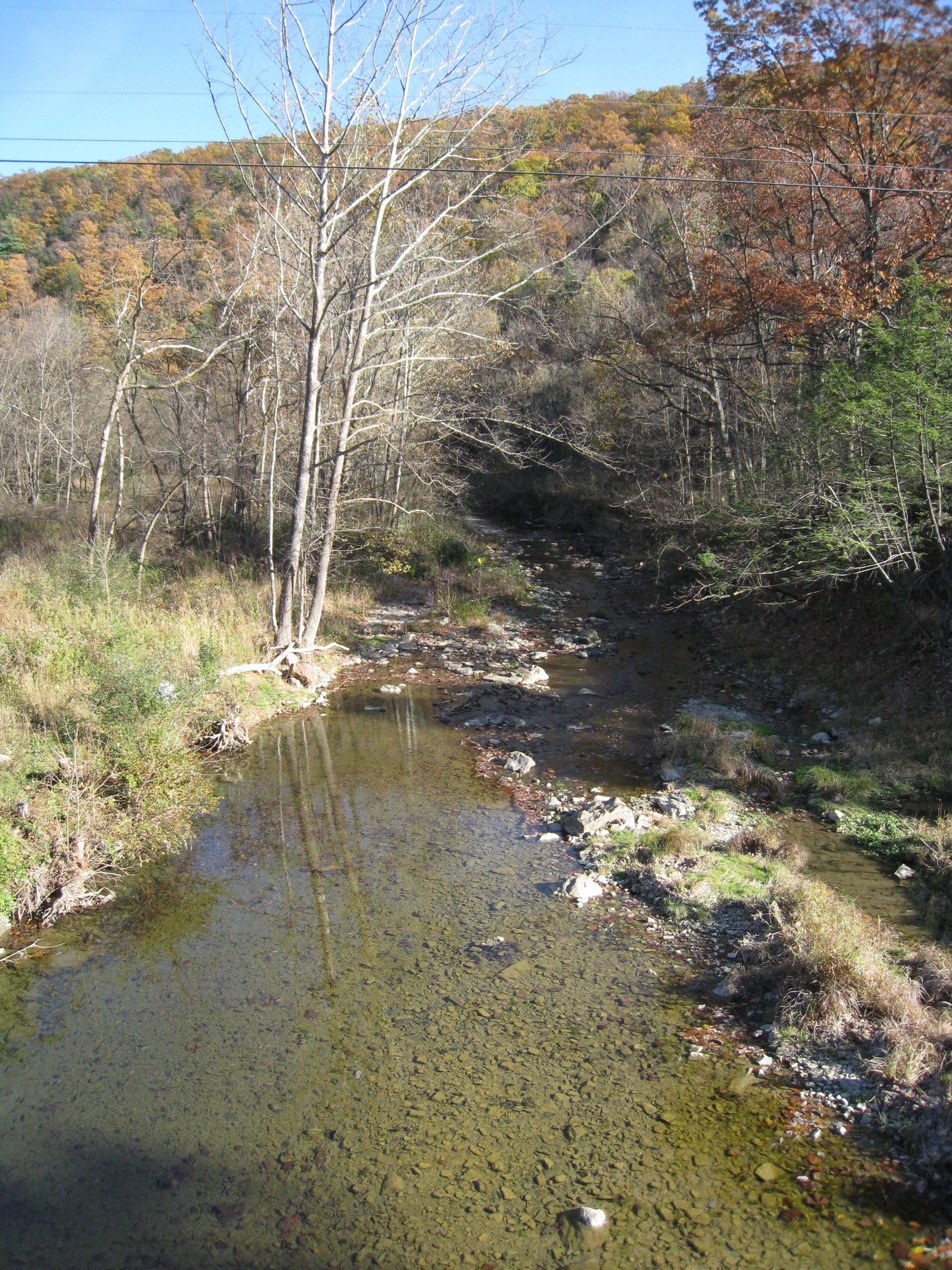
Mill Creek at Mechanicsburg Gap viewed from the Core Road (County Route 50/53) bridge near Romney

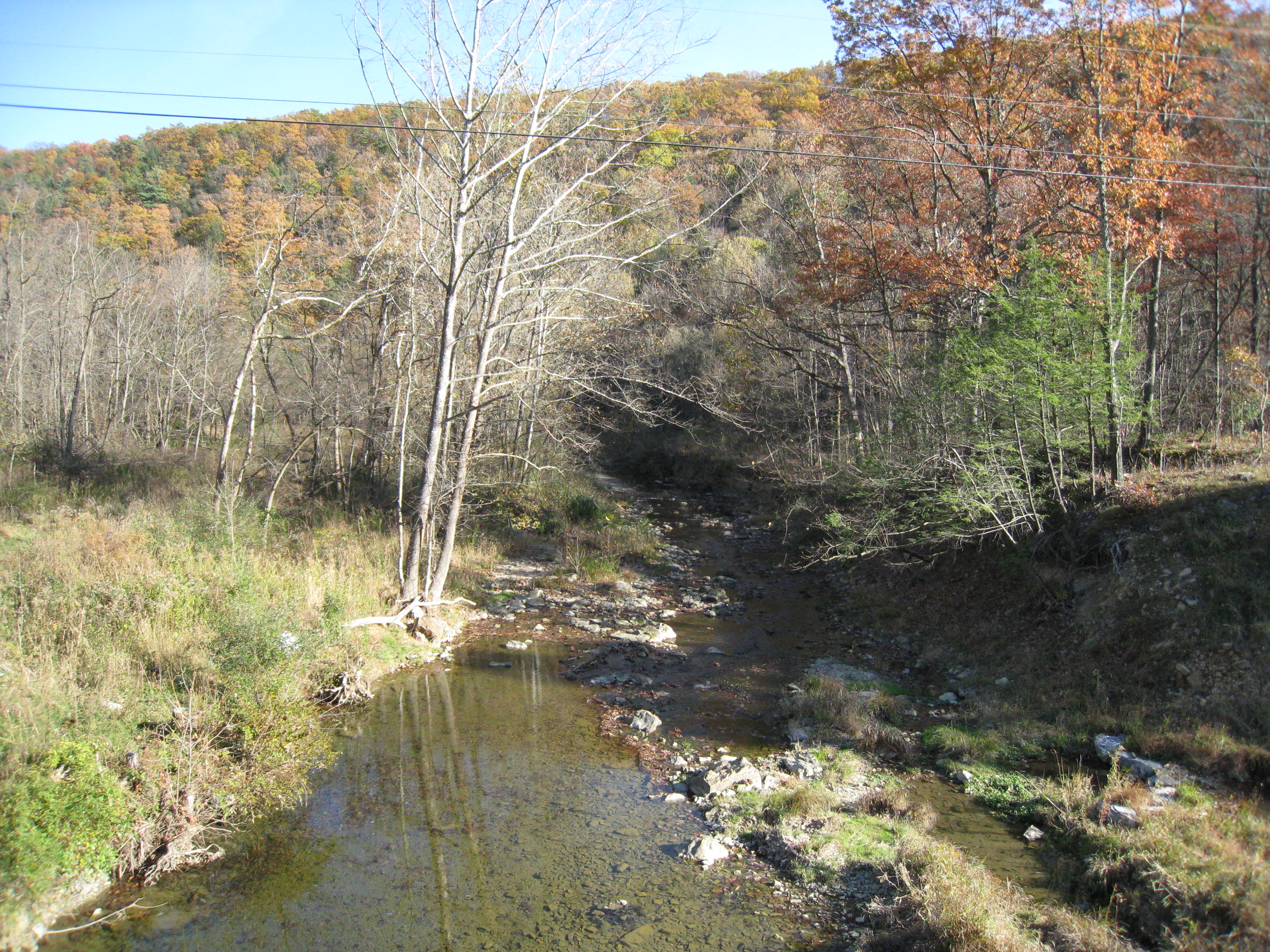
Mill Creek at Mechanicsburg Gap viewed from the Core Road (County Route 50/53) bridge near Romney

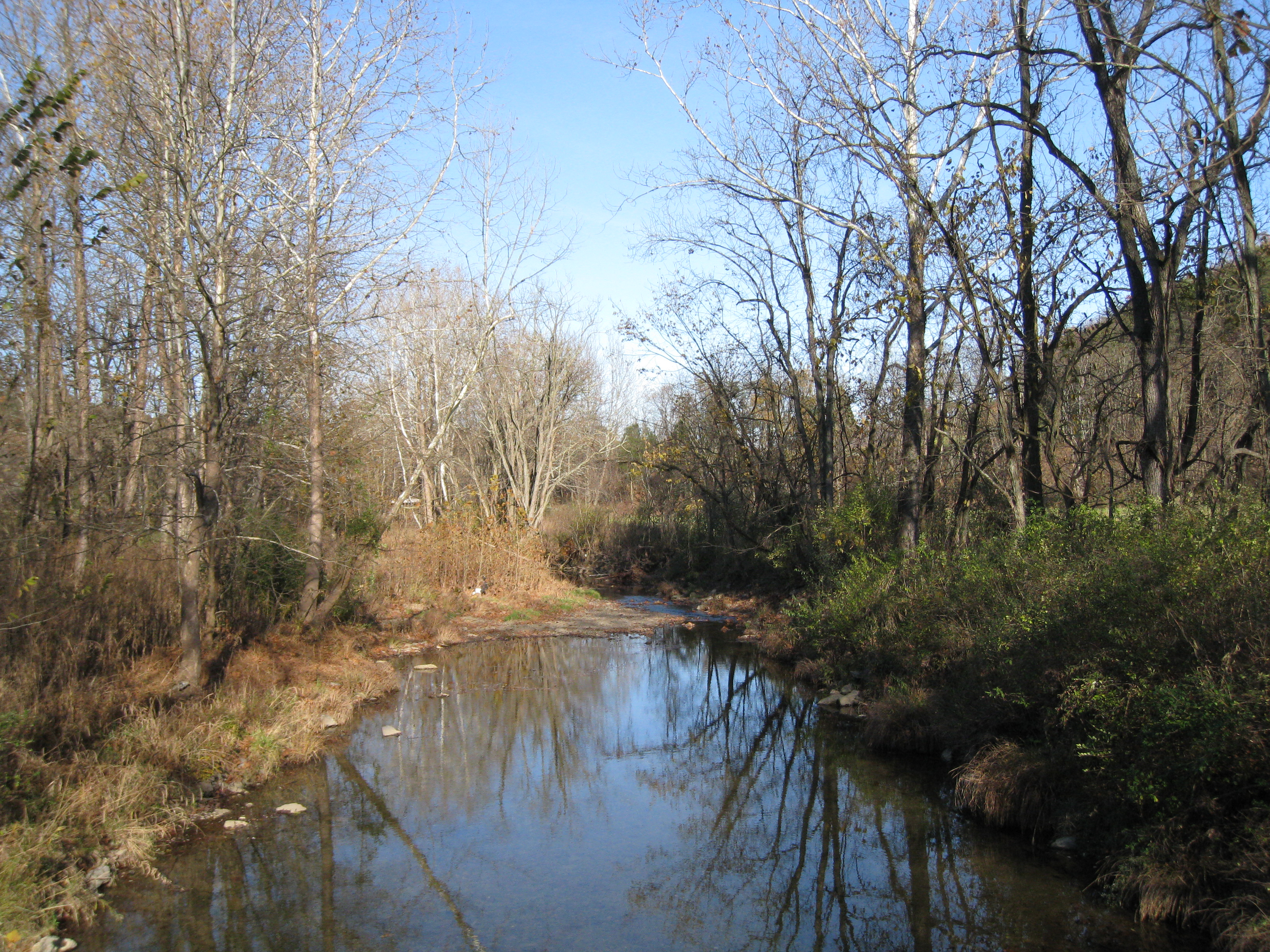
Mill Creek viewed from Trinity Road (County Route 220/11) bridge at Junction

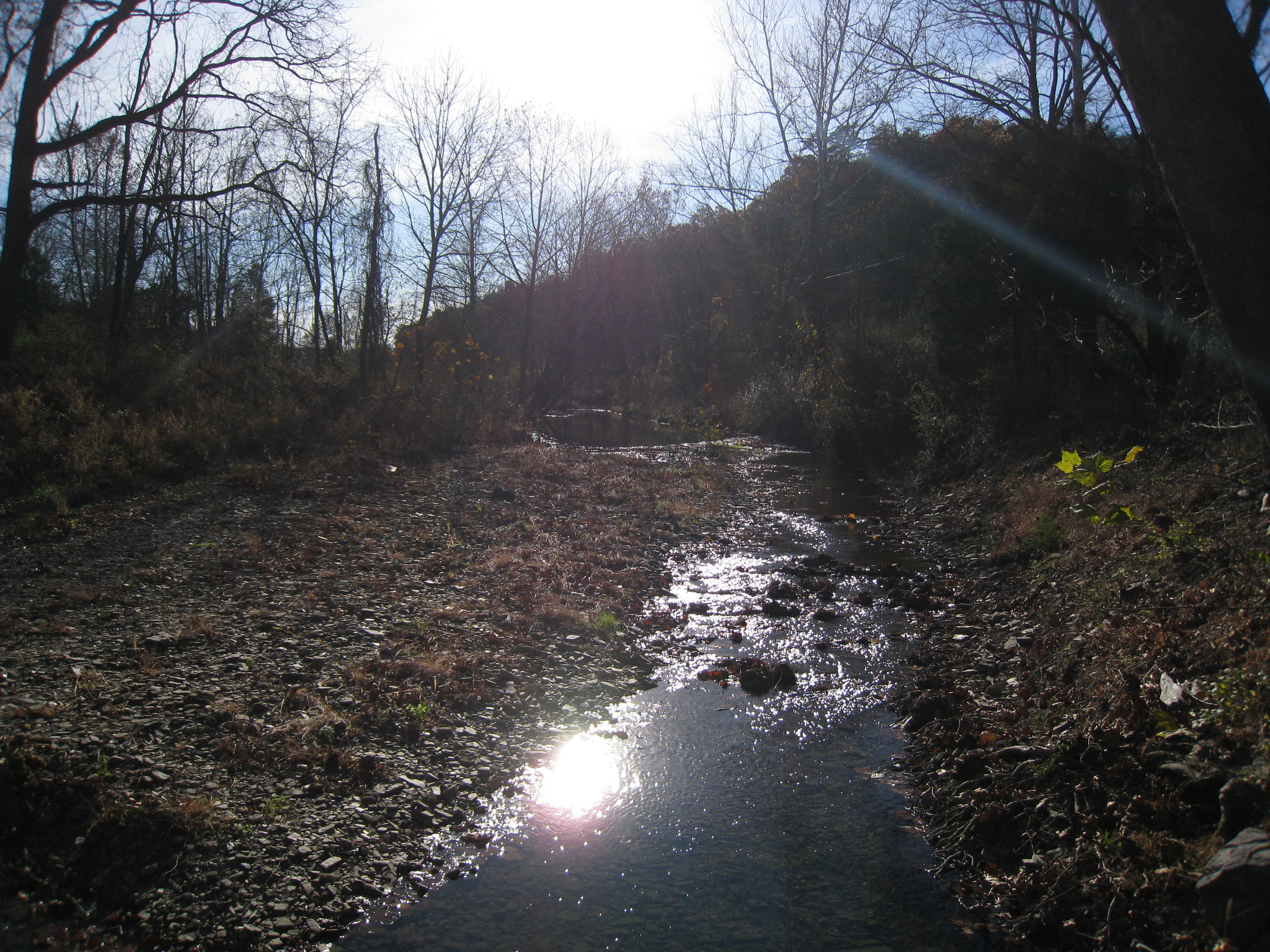
Mill Creek viewed from Trinity Road (County Route 220/11) bridge at Junction

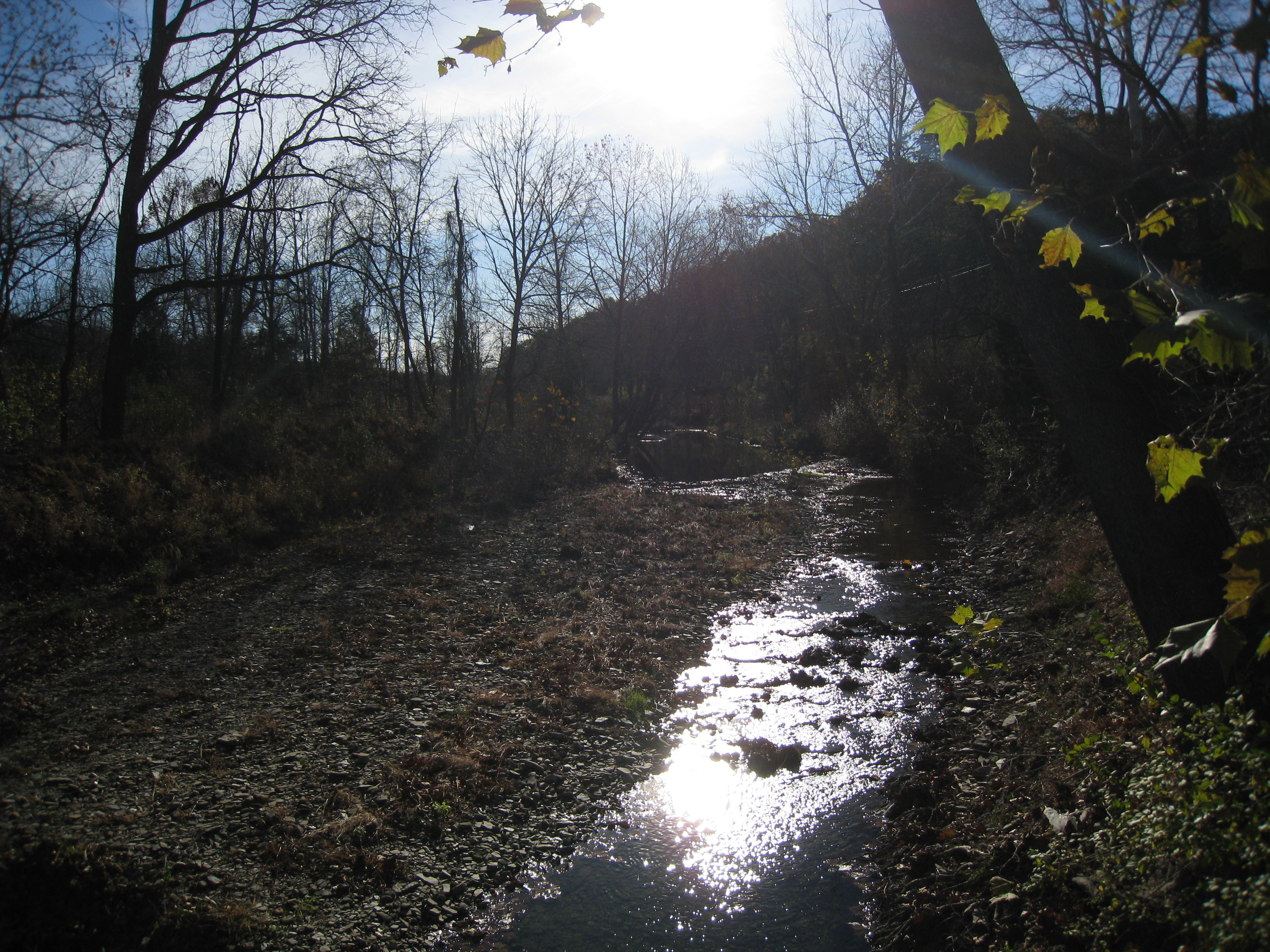
Mill Creek viewed from Trinity Road (County Route 220/11) bridge at Junction

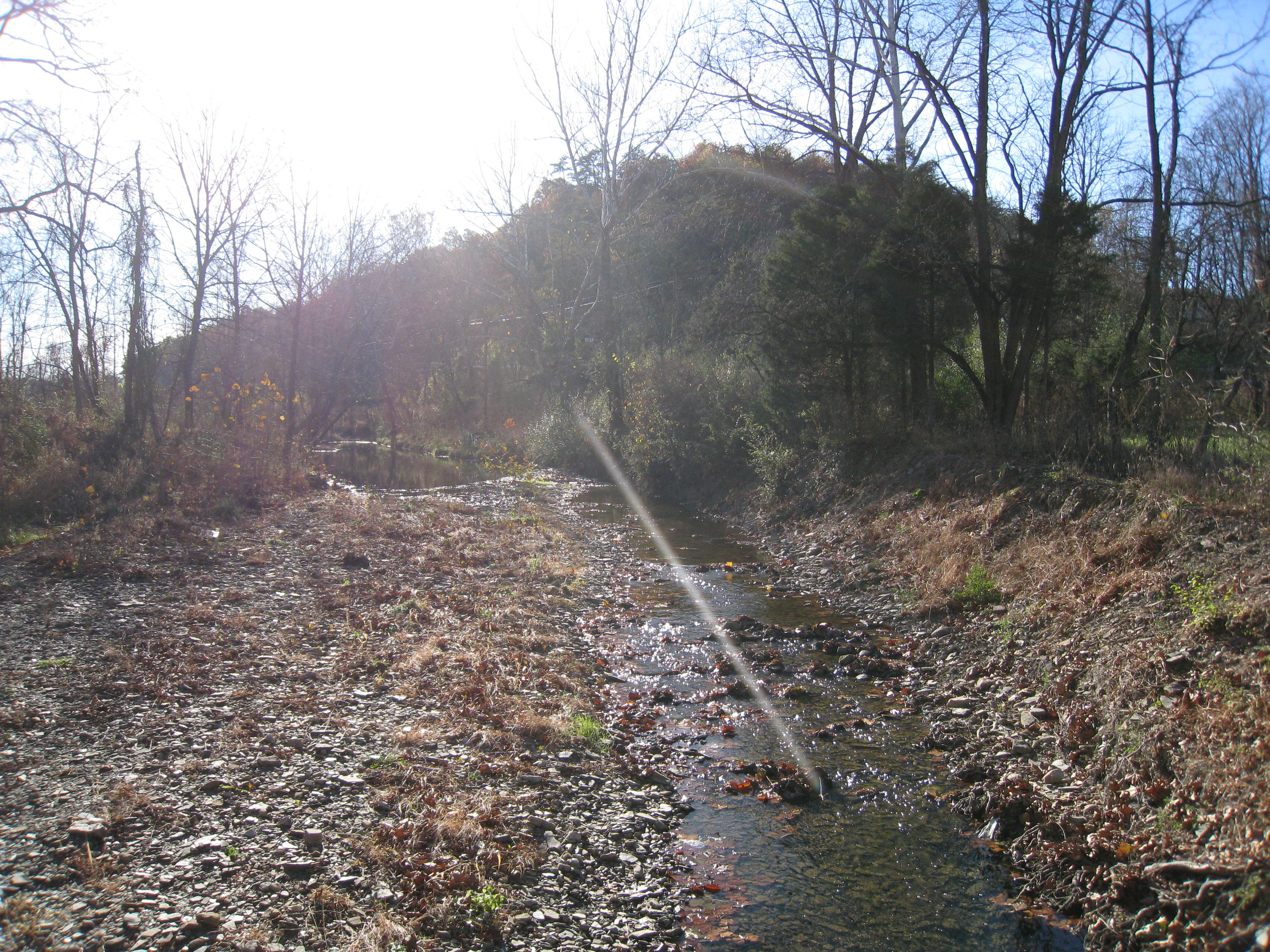
Mill Creek viewed from Trinity Road (County Route 220/11) bridge at Junction

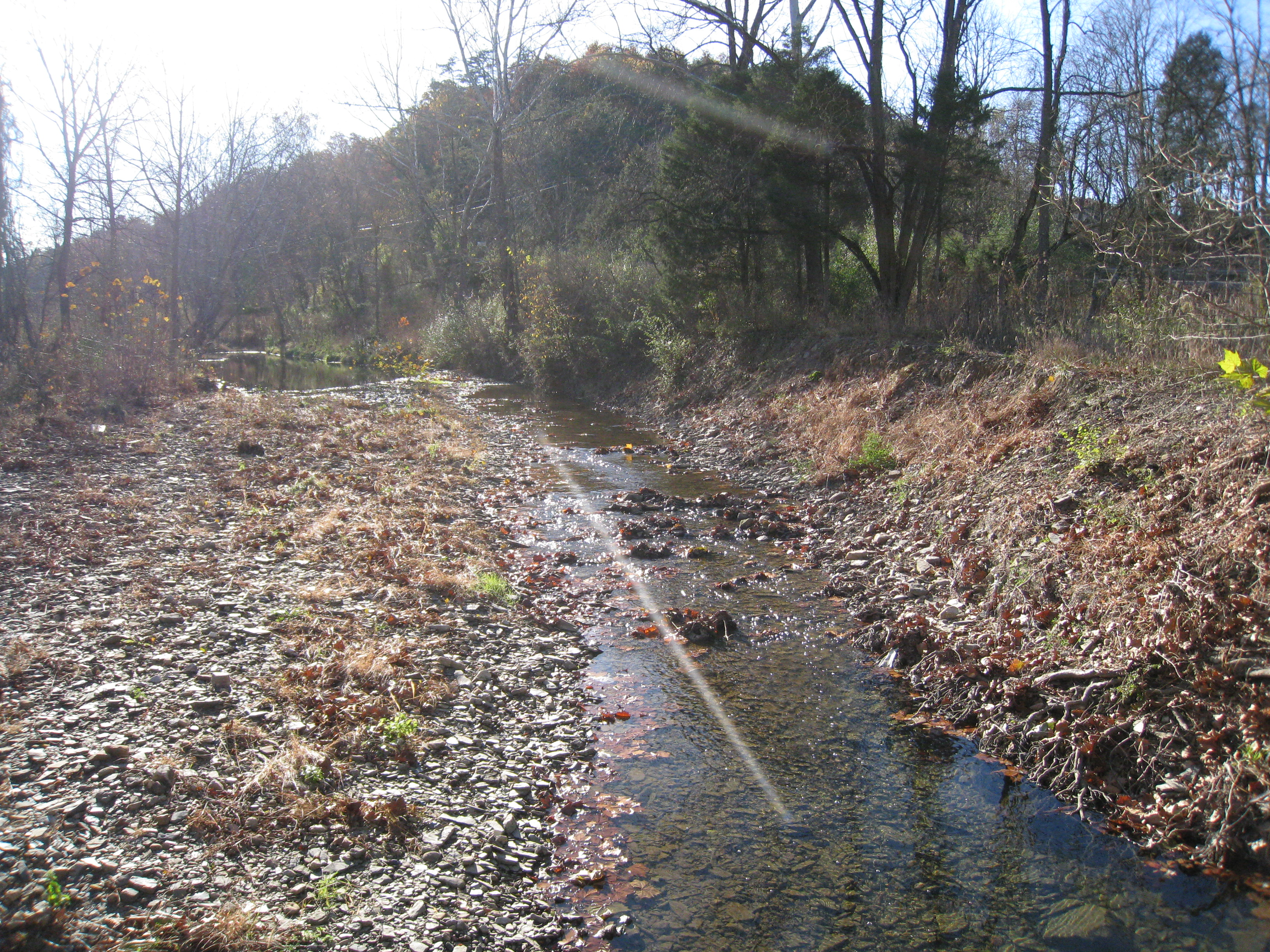
Mill Creek viewed from Trinity Road (County Route 220/11) bridge at Junction

== See also ==
- List of West Virginia rivers
