= Rada, West Virginia =

- Unincorporated community
- Location within West Virginia Location within the United States
- Coordinates: 39°16′26″N 78°54′48″W
- Country: United States
- State: West Virginia
- County: Hampshire
- Time zone: UTC-5 (Eastern (EST))
  - Summer (DST): UTC-4 (EDT)
- GNIS feature ID: 1545370

Rada is an unincorporated community in Hampshire County in the U.S. state of West Virginia. Rada is located on U.S. Highway 220/West Virginia Route 28 between Junction and Purgitsville in southwest Hampshire County along Mill Creek. It lies at an intersection of US 220/WV 28 with Rada Road (West Virginia Secondary Route 220/7).

Rada once had its own post office and school in operation here until the early 20th century. The community was named after Rada Davy, child of the postmaster during its operation.
