= Loom, West Virginia =

- Unincorporated community
- Location within West Virginia Location within the United States
- Coordinates: 39°16′43″N 78°30′41″W
- Country: United States
- State: West Virginia
- County: Hampshire
- Time zone: UTC-5 (Eastern (EST))
  - Summer (DST): UTC-4 (EDT)
- GNIS feature ID: 1554995

Loom is an unincorporated community in Hampshire County, West Virginia, United States. Loom (sometimes referred to as Loom Cemetery) is located between Capon Bridge and Hanging Rock along the Northwestern Turnpike (U.S. Route 50) on the western flanks of Cooper Mountain. Timber Mountain Road (County Route 50/22) and Beck's Gap Road (County Route 50/23) converge at Loom on U.S. Route 50.

The community's name was selected from a postal directory for its brevity.

== Historic site ==
- Central United Methodist Church & Cemetery, US Route 50 East

== Image gallery ==
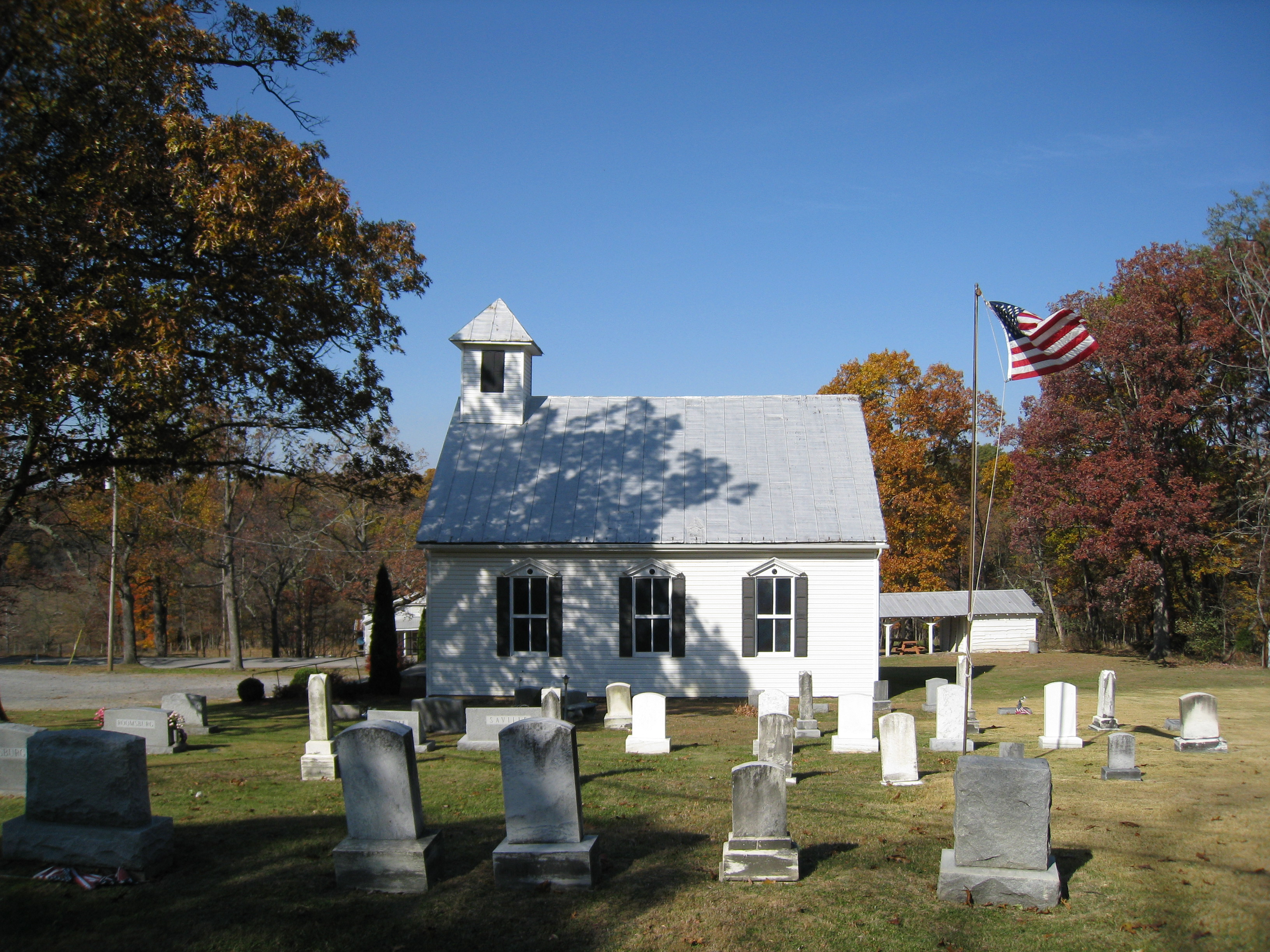
Central United Methodist Church and Cemetery along Northwestern Pike (U.S. Route 50) at Loom

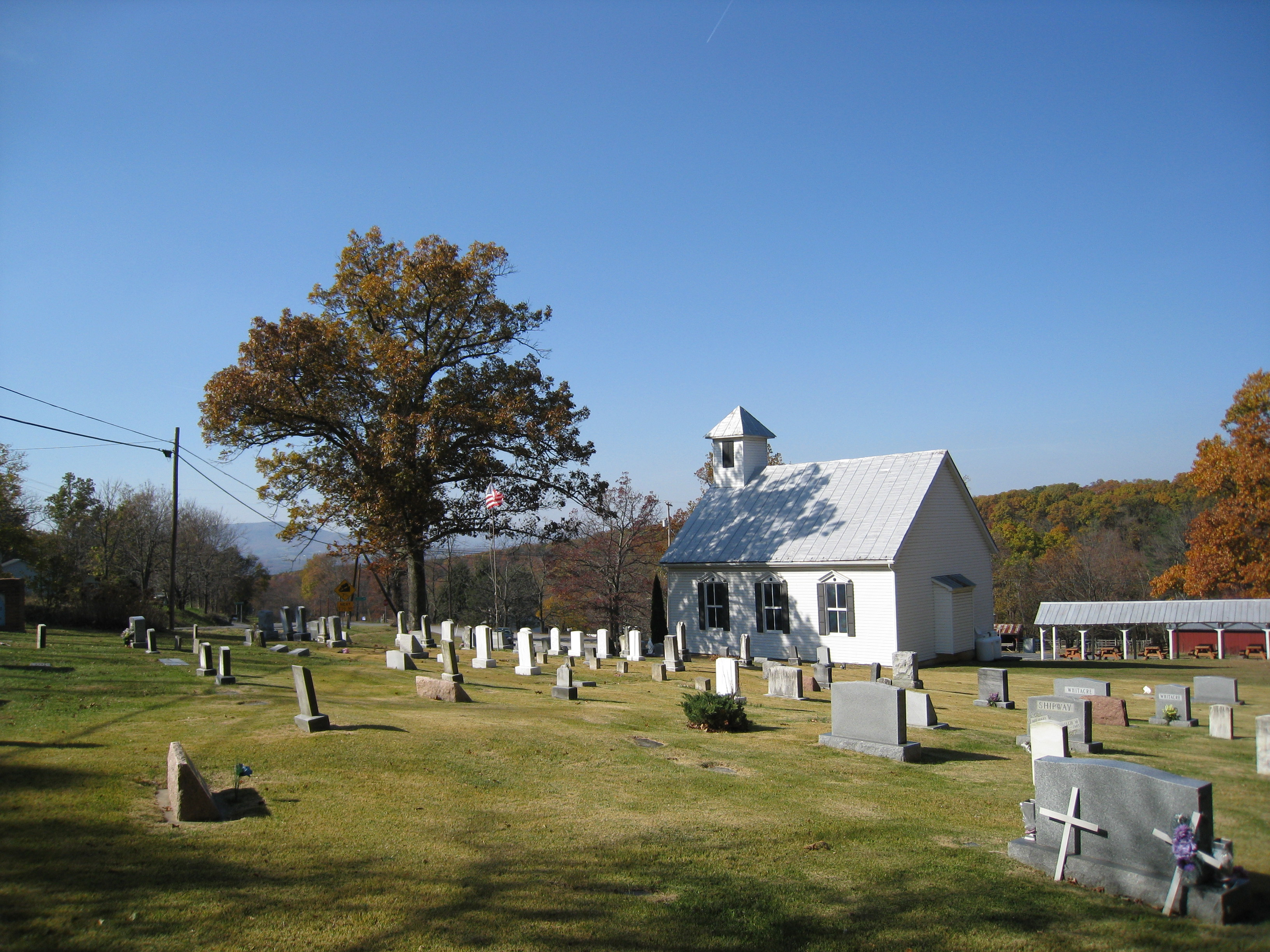
Central United Methodist Church and Cemetery along Northwestern Pike (U.S. Route 50) at Loom

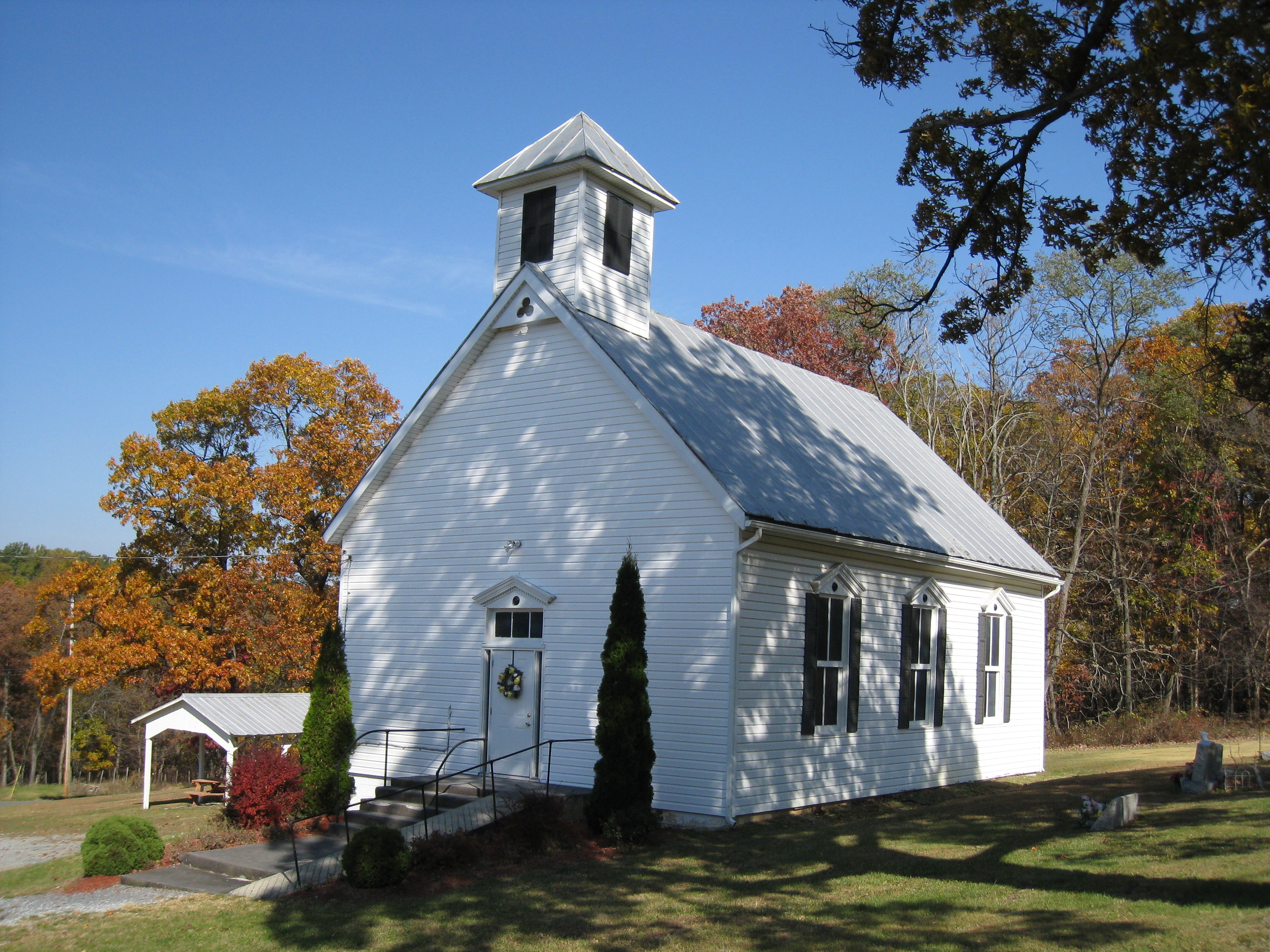
Central United Methodist Church and Cemetery along Northwestern Pike (U.S. Route 50) at Loom
