= Evansville, West Virginia =

Unincorporated community in West Virginia, United States

Evansville
- Unincorporated community
- Location within the state of West Virginia Evansville (the United States)
- Coordinates: 39°19′59″N 79°52′7″W
- Country: United States
- State: West Virginia
- County: Preston
- Elevation: 1,326 ft (404 m)
- Time zone: UTC-5 (Eastern (EST))
  - Summer (DST): UTC-4 (EDT)
- GNIS feature ID: 1538761

Evansville is an unincorporated community in Preston County, West Virginia, United States. Evansville lies on the Northwestern Turnpike (U.S. Route 50) along Little Sandy Creek.

Sources differ whether the community was named after Edward, Henry or Hugh Evans, all of whom were first settlers.
