= Cooper Mountain (West Virginia) =

Mountain in West Virginia, U.S.

Highest point
- Elevation: 2,024 ft (617 m)
- Coordinates: 39°15′28″N 78°31′33″W

Geography
- Location: Hampshire County, West Virginia, U.S.
- Parent range: Ridge-and-Valley Appalachians
- Topo map: USGS Hanging Rock

Climbing
- Easiest route: Drive

Cooper Mountain runs southwest northeast through Hampshire County in West Virginia's Eastern Panhandle, rising to its greatest elevation of 2,024 feet (617 m) above sea-level at Bens Knob. The mountain's other knob, Butchers Knob, has an elevation of 1,783 feet (543 m). Cooper Mountain is flanked to its west by North River Mountain and to its east by Parks Valley and Dillons Run. The Northwestern Turnpike (U.S. Route 50) crosses Cooper Mountain at Loom between Hanging Rock and Capon Bridge. Tourists and travelers on U.S. Route 50 pull off at the Cooper Mountain overlook for the views over Parks Valley, Capon Bridge, and the ridges of Virginia.

== Historical sites ==
- Cooper Mountain Stone Fountain, along US Route 50, was constructed around 1938 by Hubert Keister. It was abandoned in 1952 due to unsafe drinking water.

== Geology ==
Cooper mountain is situated on top of Oriskany Sandstone. There is also an anticline running along it that contains iron ore from the Clinton Series.
