= Mechanicsburg Gap =

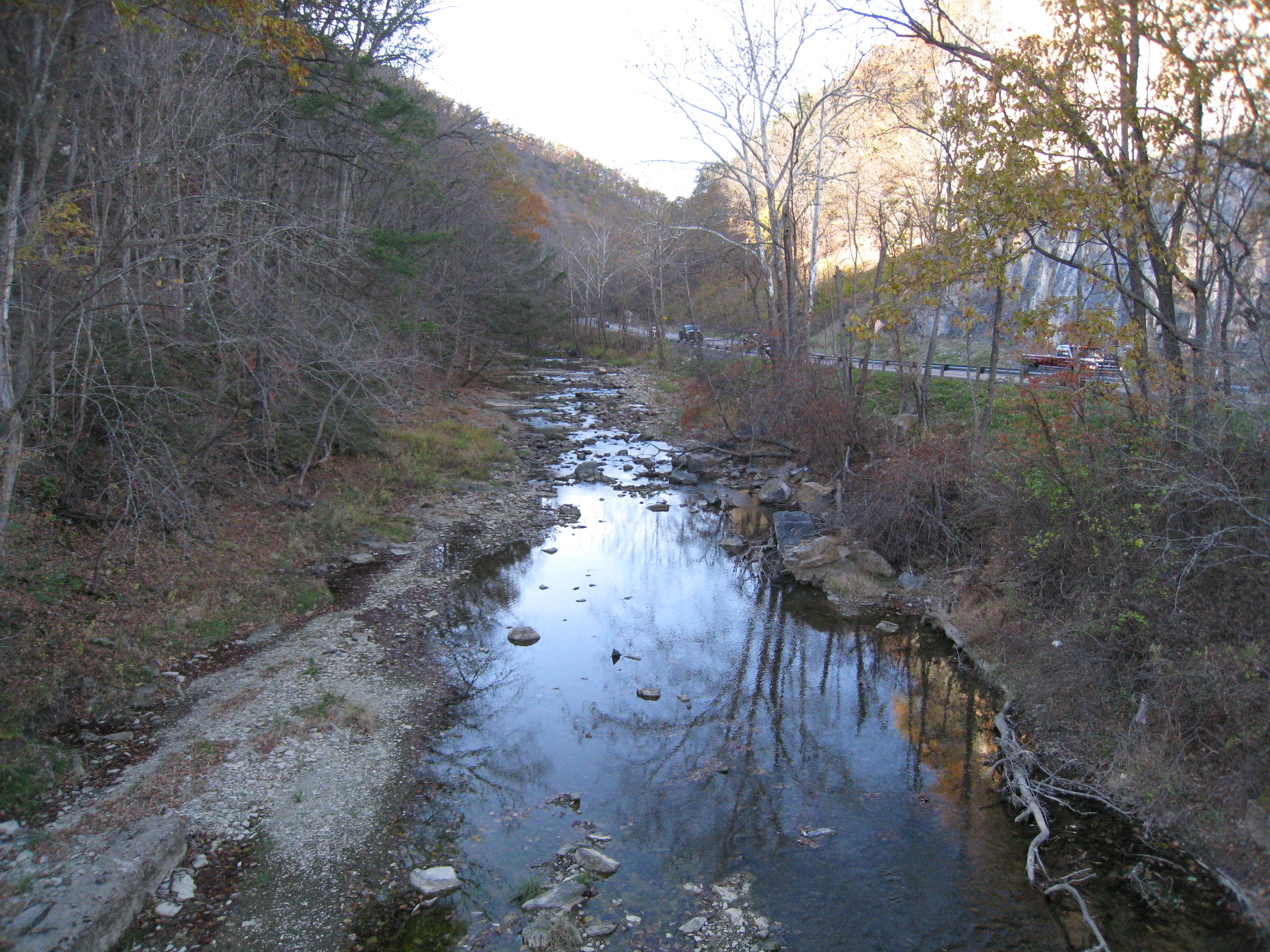
- Mill Creek at the eastern entrance of Mechanicsburg Gap.
- Interactive map of Mechanicsburg Gap
- Elevation: 876 ft (267 m)
- Traversed by: U.S. Route 50/ West Virginia Route 28

Third Approach
- Location: Hampshire County, West Virginia, United States
- Range: Mill Creek Mountain; Ridge and Valley Appalachians
- Coordinates: 39.328711°N 78.803075°W
- Topo map: USGS Romney

Mechanicsburg Gap (also known as Mill Creek Gap) is a water gap through Mill Creek Mountain in Hampshire County, West Virginia, United States.

Mechanicsburg Gap allows the passage of Mill Creek and the Northwestern Turnpike (U.S. Route 50 and West Virginia Route 28) through Mill Creek Mountain. The gap takes its name from the nearby community of Mechanicsburg, located at its western entrance.

== History ==
Mechanicsburg Gap has long been an important transportation corridor through the Ridge-and-Valley Appalachians. During the nineteenth century, the Northwestern Turnpike was routed through the gap, providing a major east-west route across the region.

The gap held strategic significance during the American Civil War. Union and Confederate forces recognized the importance of controlling the passage, and nearby Fort Mill Ridge was constructed on Mill Creek Mountain to overlook the gap and the Northwestern Turnpike.
