= Purgitsville, West Virginia =

- Unincorporated community
- Location within West Virginia Location within the United States
- Coordinates: 39°14′21″N 78°55′16″W
- Country: United States
- State: West Virginia
- County: Hampshire
- Elevation: 935 ft (285 m)
- Time zone: UTC-5 (Eastern (EST))
  - Summer (DST): UTC-4 (EDT)
- ZIP code: 26852
- Area code: 304
- GNIS feature ID: 1545324

Purgitsville is an unincorporated community in Hampshire County in the U.S. state of West Virginia. According to the 2000 census, the ZCTA for Purgitsville had a population of 813. Purgitsville is located on U.S. Highway 220/West Virginia Route 28 at its intersection with Huffman Road (West Virginia Secondary Route 220/3) south of Junction. An elementary school, Mill Creek Elementary, was open here until 1993 when it was consolidated with Romney Elementary.

The community was named after William Purgit, an early settler. In 1863, McNeill's Rangers were ambushed near the village by the Ringgold Cavalry, a Union force, but escaped with no fatalities.

== Historic sites ==
- Marvin Chapel
- Old Pine Church (1838)

== Gallery ==
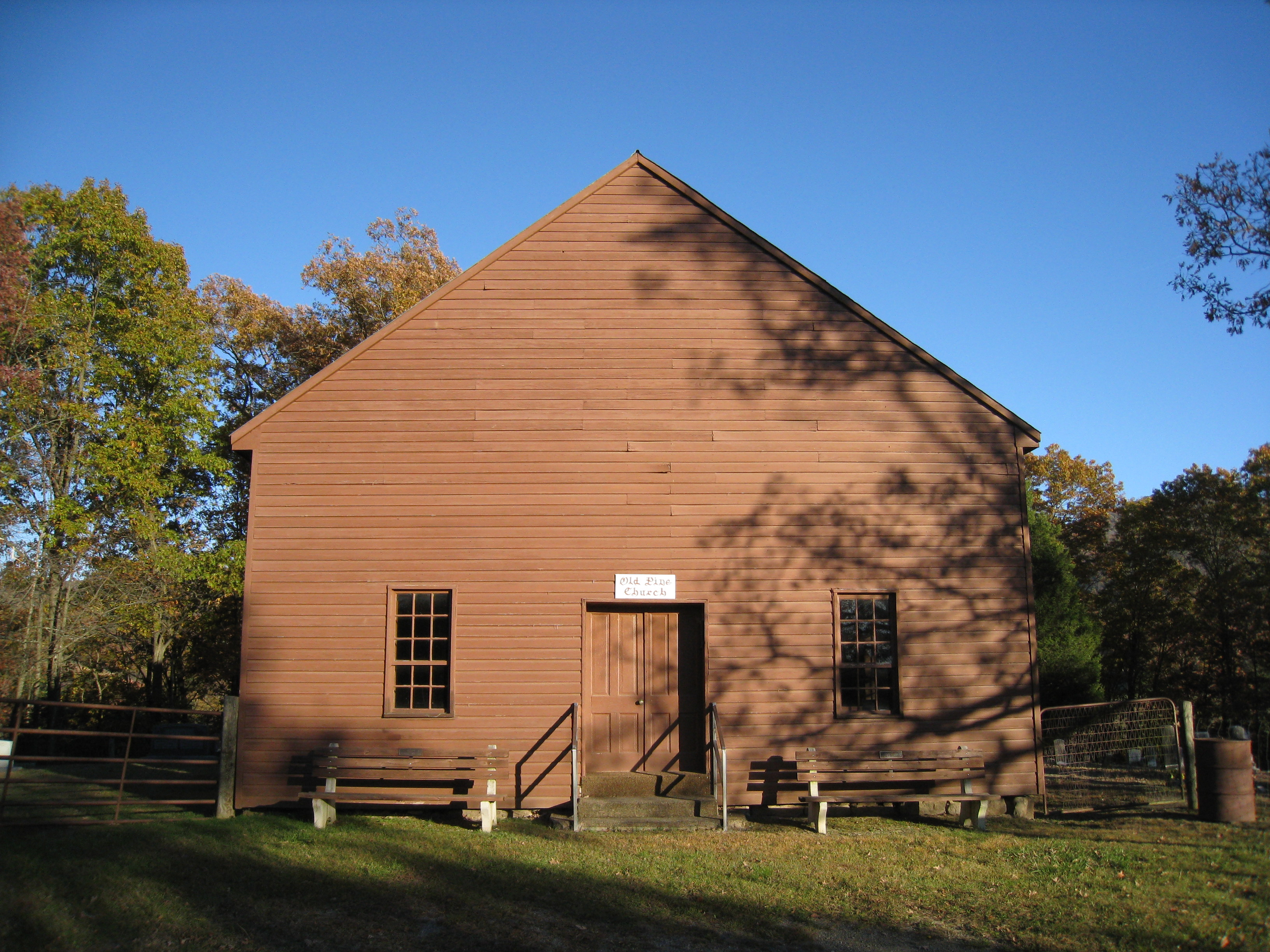
Old Pine Church off Old Pine Church Road (County Route 220/15)

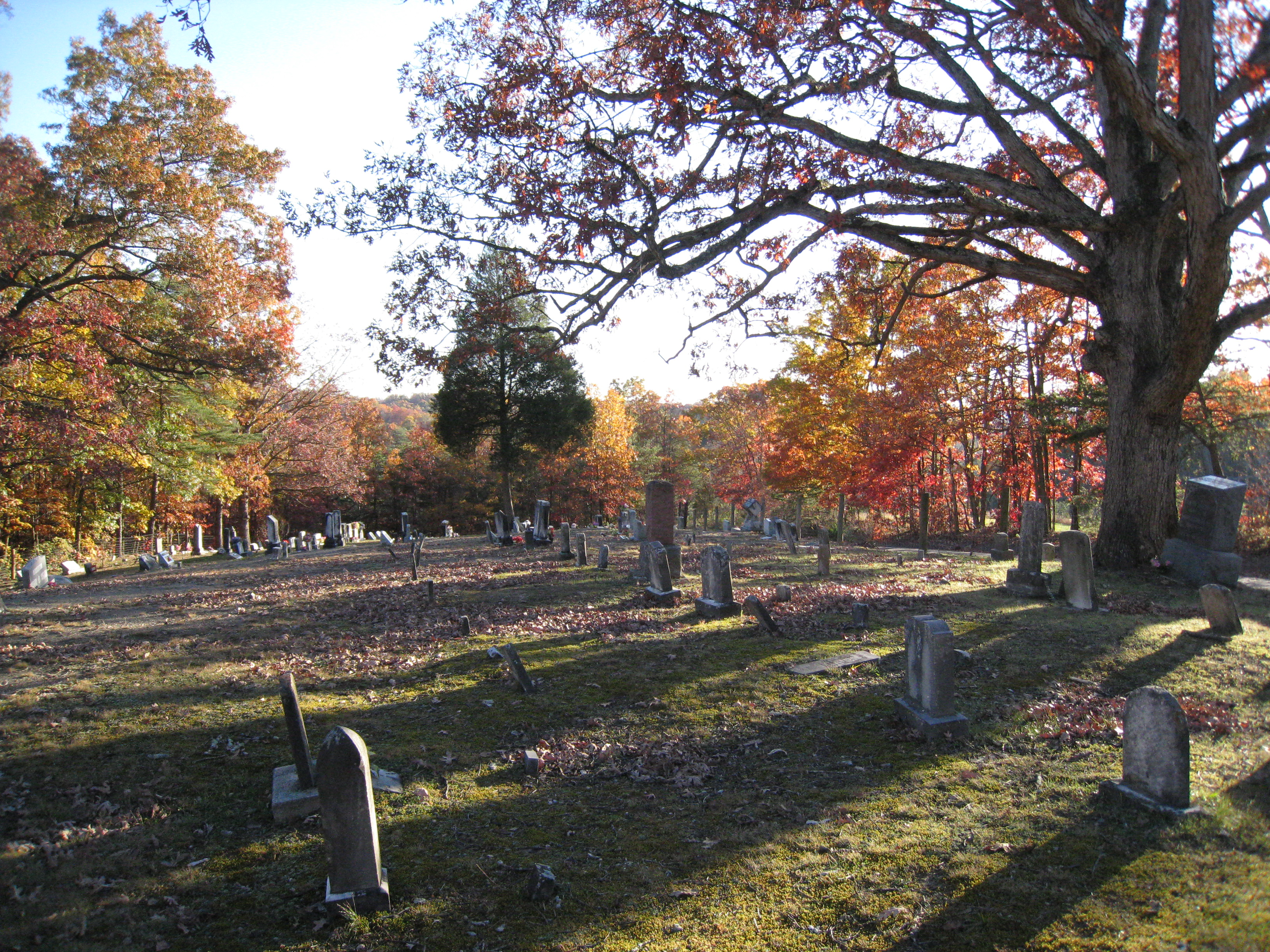
Old Pine Church Cemetery off Old Pine Church Road (County Route 220/15)

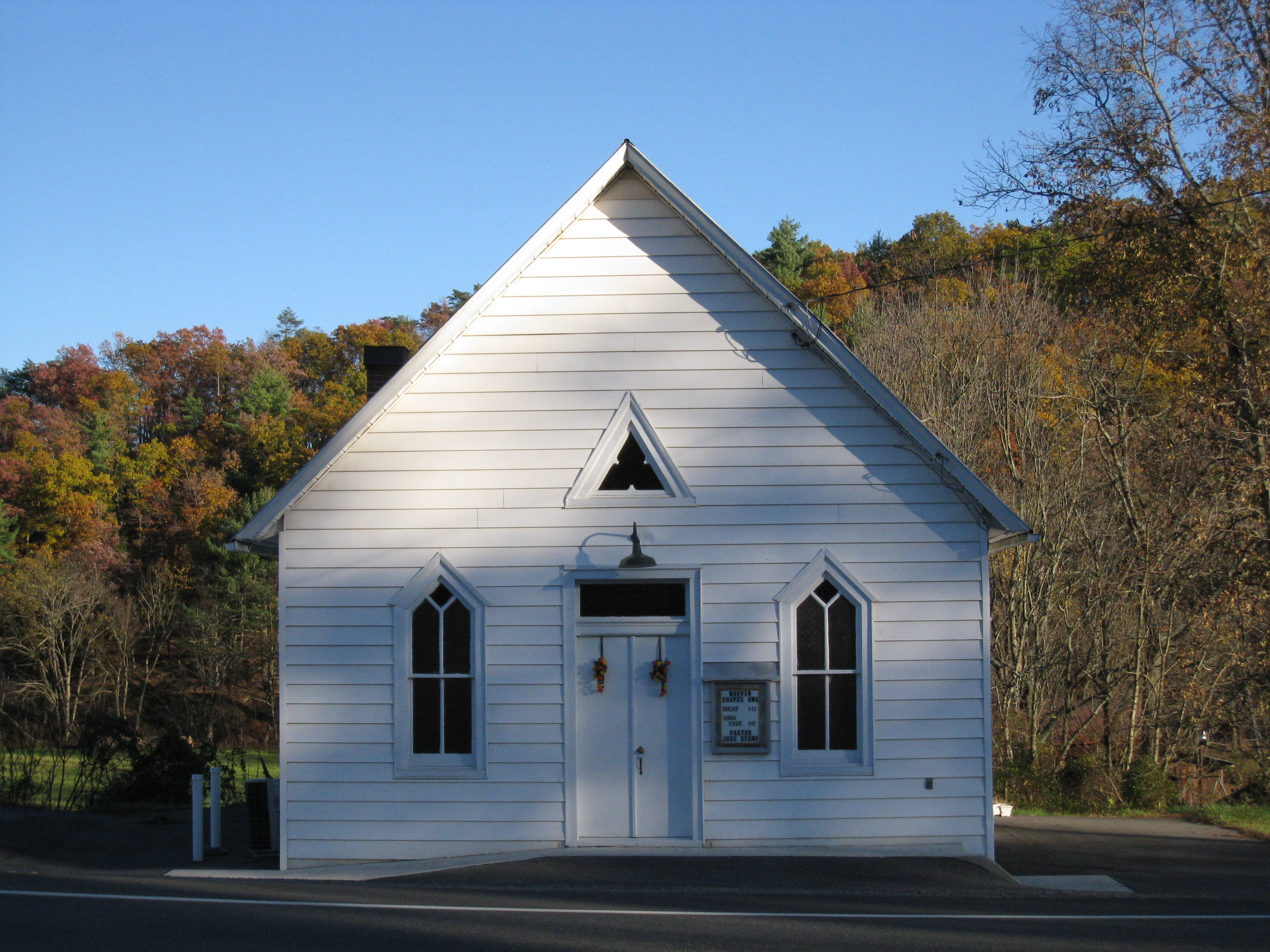
Marvin Chapel along U.S. Route 220
