= Northwestern Turnpike =

Historic road in West Virginia

The Northwestern Turnpike is a historic road in West Virginia (Virginia at the time the road was created), important for being historically one of the major roads crossing the Appalachians, financed by the Virginia Board of Public Works in 1831. In modern times, west of Winchester, Virginia, U.S. Route 50 follows the path of the Northwestern Turnpike into West Virginia, whose major Corridor D project follows the western section of the original Northwestern Turnpike.

== History ==
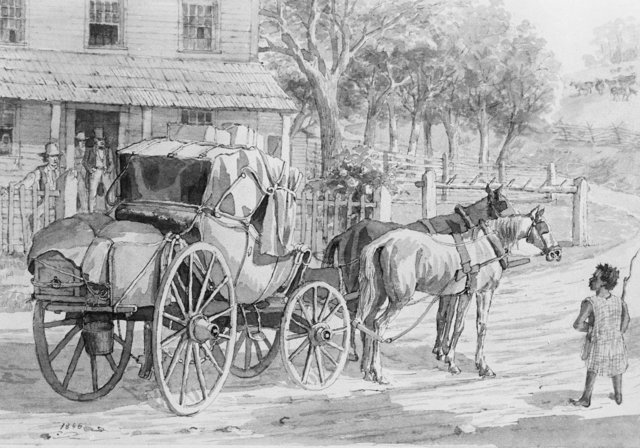
"Stagecoach stop on the Northwestern Turnpike" (1846), by Joseph H. Diss Debar. ("The first coach ... that ever traveled from Winchester to the Ohio River.")

The following description of the Northwestern Turnpike is taken from Dr. J. M. Callahan's Semi-Centennial History of West Virginia, pages 106-9, published in 1913:

"The old Northwestern Turnpike, extending from Winchester, Virginia on a general westward course to Parkersburg, West Virginia on the Ohio, is a historic highway which deserves more mention than it has ever received as a factor related to the American westward movement and to the problem of communication between East and West. It was the inevitable result of the call of the West and the need of a Virginia state road."

"Perhaps its first suggestion was recorded by George Washington, who in 1758 had been the champion of the Braddock Road (not then supposed to lie in Pennsylvania) and who in 1784 sought a route located wholly in Virginia. Returning from a visit to his western lands, after following McCulloch's Path (then the most important route across the rugged ridges between the valleys), he crossed the North Branch Potomac River on the future route of the greater Virginia highway which was partially realized in the 'state road' authorized from Winchester via Romney to Morgantown before 1786, and extended westward in 1786 by a branch road from near Cheat to Clarksburg, from which the first road was marked to the mouth of the Little Kanawha River between 1788 and 1790."

"The later turnpike was planned and constructed by Virginia partly as a result of the rival activities of New York, Pennsylvania, and Maryland to secure the advantage in transportation facilities for the trade of the West; and was especially regarded as a rival of the National Road which was opened from Cumberland to Wheeling in 1818, and with which parts of Virginia obtained better connection in 1830 by a stage line established from Winchester to Cumberland. It was built across the Appalachian Divide with the hope of securing commercial superiority, and was the main thoroughfare between East and West through northern Virginia."

"The act in incorporation of 1827, authorizing subscriptions at Winchester, Romney, Moorefield, Beverly, Kingwood, Pruntytown, Clarksburg, and Parkersburg made the mistake of arbitrarily locating the route through important towns without proper consideration of the physical features of the country. After finding a way through Hampshire County via Mechanicsburg Gap in Mill Creek Mountain, and pushing on into Preston County, the engineers encountered insurmountable obstacles to the Kingwood route, causing the stock to languish."

"The enterprise was saved by the remarkable act of 1831 which organized a road company, with the Governor as President and one of the Board of Directors, with power to borrow money ($125,000) on the credit of the State to construct a turnpike road of a minimum width of twelve feet, 'from Winchester to some point on the Ohio River to be situated by the principal engineer', and with the right to erect bridges or to regulate ferries already in existence and to establish toll-gates on each twenty-mile (32 km) section completed."

"The chief engineer was Col. Claudius Crozet, a French officer of artillery under Napoleon Bonaparte in the Russian campaign, and later professor of engineering in the United States Military Academy from 1816 to 1823. He was assisted by Charles B. Shaw."

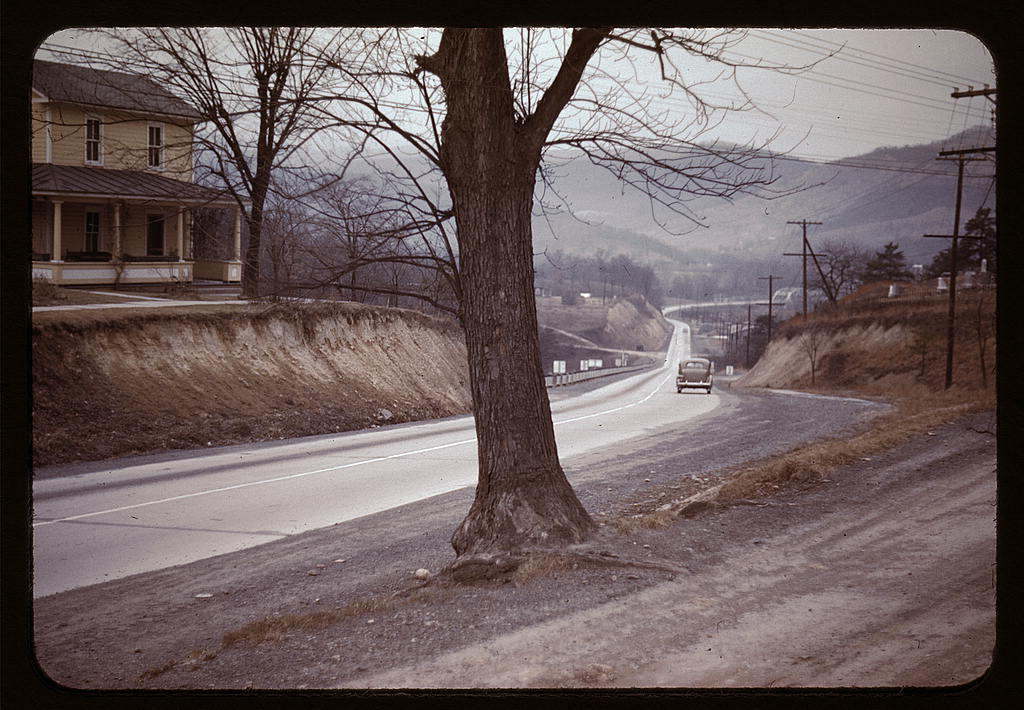
Northwestern Turnpike leading west from Romney, 1942

"The chosen route was through Hampshire County, West Virginia, Mineral County, West Virginia, Grant County, West Virginia, Garrett County, Maryland, Preston County, West Virginia, Taylor County, West Virginia, Harrison County, West Virginia, Doddridge County, West Virginia, Ritchie County, West Virginia, and Wood County, West Virginia. In Hampshire County it was established via Capon Bridge, Hanging Rock, Pleasant Dale, and Augusta to Romney, west of which it crossed the South Branch Potomac River. Through Mineral it passed via Burlington, thence westward across Patterson Creek, and through Ridgeville on the divide to New Creek which it crossed at Rees' tannery. Then turning toward the southwest, it crossed the North Branch Potomac River southwest of the present town of Gormania and entered the southwest corner of Maryland through which it passed for eight and three-fourths miles, crossing the Alleghenies and emerging into Preston east of the German settlement (later known as Aurora). It passed across the picturesque Cheat Valley considerably south of Rowlesburg, and via Fellowsville, Evansville, Thornton, Grafton, Pruntytown, and Bridgeport to Clarksburg, thence over the summit via the head of Ten Mile Creek to Salem, thence across Middle Island Creek at West Union and via Tollgate, Pennsboro, Ellenboro (earlier Shumley), the head of Goose Creek, and Murphytown to Parkersburg. Much of the route passed through a vast wilderness interspersed here and there by a few old settlements and towns."

"No longer dependent on the larger towns for its success, the road was completed through the wilds of Preston, considerably south of Kingwood, in 1832, and was opened westward to Clarksburg and Parkersburg by 1838. Its construction cost $400,000. It crossed the mountains by easy grades and the larger streams (in some sections all the streams) by good bridges. It was macadamized from Tygart Valley River to Parkersburg in 1848. About 1852, it was further improved by construction of new bridges across several streams at important crossings. In 1840, facilities for travel and news were increased on the western end of the road by the establishment of a daily line of stages, and a regular mail service, which made connection with the Ohio steamers at Parkersburg. By 1845, there was a line of fast tri-weekly stages at Romney to the Ohio at Parkersburg. It connected at Romney with stages from Winchester, from Moorefield, and from Green Spring at which connections were made with Baltimore by trains of the Baltimore and Ohio Railway. The fare from Green Spring to Parkersburg (210 miles) was $10.00."

"The road, establishing commercial and other relations, soon became a busy thoroughfare of travel and traffic which stimulated the creation of many inns and towns along the route - such as Aurora, Fellowsville, Evansville (1833), and West Union (1846). In many ways it influenced the material prosperity and social life of the people of the region through which it passed. Following the act of 1831, which provided for satisfactory adjustment of land titles, it was an important incentive to immigration and settlement and development - especially along the region of southern Preston and in Ritchie. Its construction also stimulated the construction of intersecting roads, such as the Brandonville pike, starting from Somerfield, Pennsylvania, passing via Kingwood, and connecting with the Northwestern at a point which became Fellowsville by 1848. It also doubtless influenced the legislature in 1837 to provide for a survey of Cheat from the turnpike crossing to the Pennsylvania line. On some parts of the course it furnished the incentive for the establishment of inns to meet the needs of those who desired to escape the heat of the seaboard by a summer sojourn amid the wild beauty of the mountains, whose streams were filled with trout and whose forest furnished a home for deer and other game."

"Beyond the headwaters of the Potomac, it passed over the Backbone, opening the way to a remote and inaccessible region bordering on the land of Canaan, which was made famous a few years later by 'The Clerk of Oxenford' (David Hunter Strother) in 'The Blackwater Chronicle' and later by the same writer under the nom de plume 'Porte Crayon' in 'A Visit to the Virginian Canaan.'"

"It might have been a road of greater importance if Virginia soon after its completion had not been induced to divert her interest from turnpikes to canals - influenced by the completion of a Pennsylvania system of transportation connecting with the Ohio at Pittsburgh. West of the Alleghenies, it was extensively damaged by the numerous heavy cattle driven over it in the winter and early spring. It was also much injured by high waters, especially in 1852 and 1853."

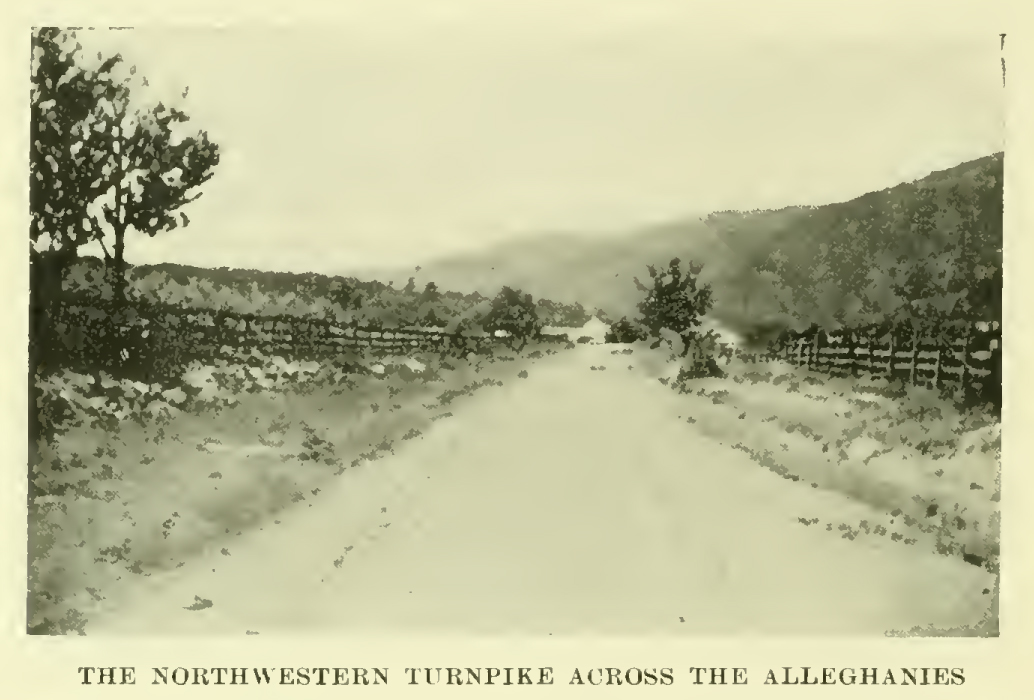
Northwestern Turnpike, circa 1908

"Although it never became of national importance as did its more renowned national rival at the north, it was for a while the busy scene of much business of a national character and gave fair promise of serving well the purpose for which Virginia had planned it until its larger usefulness was transferred to its horseless rival which, persistently overcoming obstacles and opposition, reached Cumberland by 1845, Grafton in 1852, and Parkersburg in 1857."

"Supported by a sentiment that long scorned the possibility of competition and that later opposed any improved system of transportation which, by absorbing the slower traffic, might close the taverns and ruin the local market for grain and provisions, it was finally paralleled by a railroad which diverted its travel and traffic, created rival towns, and brought pioneer prospectors and promoters who prepared the way for the later era of larger industrial development."

"Although its utility was diminished by proximity to the railroad, it was still in moderate repair in the decade after the close of the war, and it has continued a constant local benefit to the territory through which it passes."

"While the Northwestern Turnpike does not cross Hardy County, it has affected the transportation to a large extent from the Moorefield and Petersburg regions to the north, and with the completion of West Virginia Route 28 to Junction will be the main outlet, both eastward and westward, for all the region from Moorefield southward, or until such time as old West Virginia Route 54 (now WV 28) is paved from Romney to Alaska from which point a hard-surfaced road extends to Cumberland where connection is made with the National Road (U.S. Route 40)."

== Notable stops along the route ==
=== Mineral County, West Virginia ===
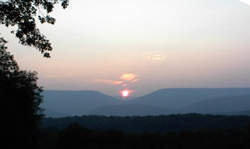
Saddle Mountain as viewed at sunrise from Skyline on U.S. Route 50 in West Virginia

- Historic Site
  - Weaver's Antique Service Station
  - Claysville Church
  - Saddle Mountain Overlook
  - Patterson Creek Manor
  - Saddle Mountain
  - Travelers Rest
- Location
  - Burlington Intersection of Patterson Creek Road
  - Claysville Near the intersection of WV 93
  - Near the intersection of WV 42
  - Burlington
  - Viewed from Skyline
  - Markwood

=== Hampshire County, West Virginia ===
- While winding through Hampshire County, the Northwestern Turnpike passes through several historic communities, some of which with only a few old buildings remaining. These communities include Junction, Mechanicsburg, Vanderlip, Romney, Shanks, Frenchburg, Augusta, Pleasant Dale, Hanging Rock, Loom and Capon Bridge.

- Attraction
  - Sloan–Parker House (Stone House), built 1790
  - The Burg, built c. 1769
  - Fort Mill Ridge Civil War Trenches
  - Mount Pisgah Benevolence Cemetery
  - Indian Mound Cemetery
  - Historic Downtown Romney
  - West Virginia Schools for the Deaf and Blind, 1846
  - Straw's Country Store Museum
  - Cooper Mountain Overlook
  - Frye's Inn, c. 1800
  - Hook's Tavern, 1790
- Location
  - Junction
  - Mechanicsburg West of Romney at Fox Hollow Road (CR 50/4)
  - Mechanicsburg at Mechanicsburg Gap
  - Romney West Main Street
  - Romney West Main Street
  - Romney Main & High Streets
  - Romney East Main Street
  - Augusta East of Augusta at Dunmore Ridge Road (CR 50/18)
  - Loom West of Capon Bridge
  - Capon Bridge
  - Capon Bridge East of Capon Bridge at Smokey Hollow Road (CR 6)
