= Mechanicsburg, West Virginia =

- Unincorporated community
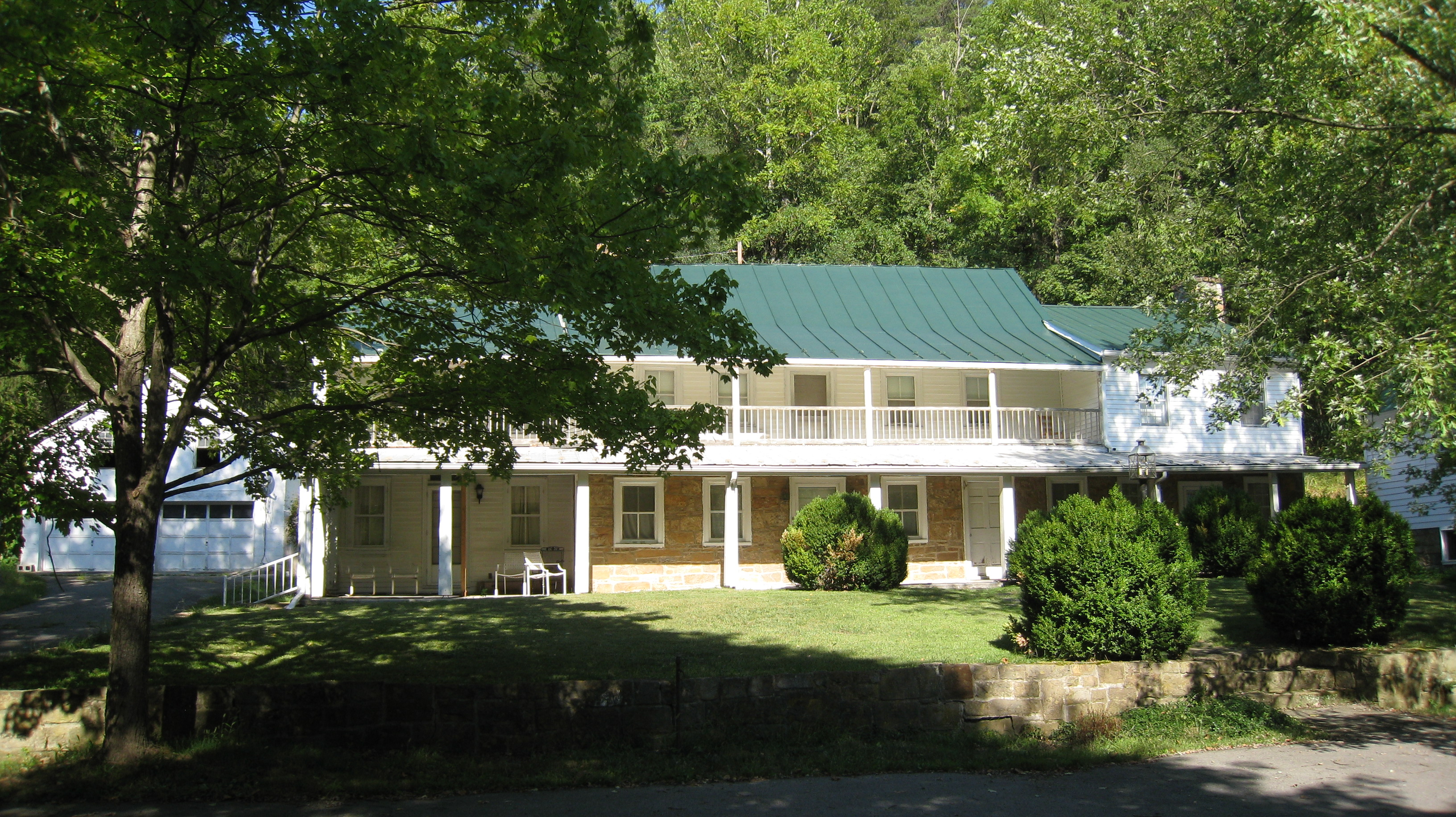
- "The Burg"

- Location within West Virginia Location within the United States
- Coordinates: 39°20′7″N 78°48′37″W
- Country: United States
- State: West Virginia
- County: Hampshire
- Time zone: UTC-5 (Eastern (EST))
  - Summer (DST): UTC-4 (EDT)
- GNIS feature ID: 1549817

Mechanicsburg, also known as Mechanicsville, is an unincorporated community in Hampshire County, West Virginia, United States. It is located on the Northwestern Turnpike (U.S. Route 50) west of Romney at Mill Creek Gap (sometimes referred to as Mechanicsburg Gap). Mechanicsburg is the site of "The Burg" (c. 1769), used as a headquarters by both armies during the American Civil War. Along Fox Hollow Road (County Route 50/4) lies the 19th-century Fox's Hollow Baptist Church and the old Mechanicsburg School.

The Fox's Hollow area of Mechanicsburg is currently experiencing major residential development, including Silver Leaf, a community of wooded five and 10-acre (40,000 m^{2}) lots.
