= Junction, West Virginia =

- Unincorporated community
- Location within Eastern Panhandle of West Virginia Location within West Virginia Location within the United States
- Coordinates: 39°18′47″N 78°51′46″W
- Country: United States
- State: West Virginia
- County: Hampshire
- Time zone: UTC-5 (Eastern (EST))
  - Summer (DST): UTC-4 (EDT)
- ZIP codes: 26824
- GNIS feature ID: 1558371

Junction is an unincorporated community in Hampshire County in the U.S. state of West Virginia. Historically referred to as Moorefield Junction, Junction received its name because of its location at the crossroads of U.S. Route 220/West Virginia Route 28 and the Northwestern Turnpike (U.S. Route 50). The community is located along Mill Creek.

== Historic sites ==
- Sloan–Parker House (1790), Northwestern Turnpike (US 50)
- Trinity Church, Trinity Road (CR 220/11)
