= Patterson Creek Mountain =

Mountain in the U.S. state of West Virginia

- Location within West Virginia

Highest point
- Elevation: 2,618 ft (798 m)
- Coordinates: 39°13′34″N 78°59′21″W

Geography
- Location: West Virginia, U.S.
- Parent range: Ridge-and-Valley Appalachians
- Topo map: USGS Old Fields

Climbing
- Easiest route: Drive

Patterson Creek Mountain is a mountain ridge that forms the border between Mineral and Hampshire counties and Grant and Hardy Counties in West Virginia's Eastern Panhandle. The mountain's namesake, Patterson Creek, parallels its western flank. The southern end of the Patterson Creek Mountain is near the confluence of Lunice Creek and the South Branch Potomac River and its northern end is located southwest of Springfield. The mountain reaches its highest elevation at Charles Knob.

== Summits and knobs ==
Patterson Creek Mountain is a mountain ridge made up of multiple peaks. The following are listed from the mountain's southern end to its northern end.

- Charles Knob, 2,723 feet (830 m)
- Round Knob, 2,308 feet (703 m)
- Turkey Mountain, 2,172 feet (662 m)
- Huckleberry Ridge, 2,539 feet (774 m)
- Slate Lick Knob, 1,713 feet (522 m)
- Middle Ridge, 1,575 feet (480 m)
- Buck Ridge, 1,200 feet (366 m)
