= List of settlements in the Eastern Panhandle of West Virginia =

List of communities in the Eastern Panhandle of West Virginia, arranged in alphabetical order. Incorporated municipalities are listed in bold. Asterisks (*) indicate a county seat.

moundsville Mcmechen

== A ==
- Allensville
- Antioch
- Arden
- Arkansas
- Arthur
- Augusta

== B ==
- Baker
- Bakerton
- Bardane
- Barnes Mill
- Barnum
- Basore
- Bass
- **Bath (Berkeley Springs)***
- Baughman Settlement
- Baxter
- **Bayard**
- Bean Settlement
- Bedington
- Berkeley
- Berryville
- Beryl
- Bessemer
- Bismarck
- Blaine
- Blair
- Blairton
- Bloomery, Hampshire County
- Bloomery, Jefferson County
- Blue Ridge Acres
- Blues Beach
- **Bolivar**
- Brake
- Brandywine
- Browns Corner
- Brushy Run
- Bubbling Spring
- Bunker Hill
- Burlington
- Burnt Factory

== C ==
- Cabins
- Campbells
- **Capon Bridge**
- Capon Lake
- Capon Springs
- Capon Springs Station
- **Carpendale**
- Cave
- Champwood
- **Charles Town***
- Cherry Grove
- Cherry Run
- Circleville
- Claysville
- Cold Stream
- **Corporation of Ranson**
- Creekvale
- Cross
- Cunningham

== D ==
- Dahmer
- Dans Run
- Darkesville
- Davis Ford
- Delray
- Dillons Run
- Dobbin
- Doe Gully
- Donaldson
- Dorcas
- Douglas Grove
- Dry Run
- Duckwall
- Duffields
- Durgon

== E ==
- Egypt
- **Elk Garden**
- Emoryville
- Engle
- Entry

== F ==
- Fairfax
- Falling Waters
- Fame
- Files Crossroad
- Fisher
- Flats
- Forge Hill
- Forks of Cacapon
- Forman
- Fort Ashby
- Fort Run
- Fort Seybert
- **Franklin***
- Franklintown
- Frenchburg

== G ==
- Ganotown
- Georgetown
- Gerrardstown
- Glebe
- Glengary
- Good
- Gormania
- Grace
- Great Cacapon
- Green Ridge
- Green Spring
- Greenland
- Greensburg
- Greenwood
- Grubbs Corner

== H ==
- Hainesville, Berkeley County
- Hainesville, Hampshire County
- Halltown
- Hampshire
- Hancock
- Hanging Rock
- Hansrote
- Harper
- **Harpers Ferry**
- Hartmansville
- Headsville
- **Hedgesville**
- Henry
- Higginsville
- High View
- Holton
- Hooks Mills
- Hopeville
- Hoy

== I ==
- Inkerman
- Intermont
- Inwood

== J ==
- Jamestown
- Jericho
- Jerome
- Jimtown
- Johnsons Mill
- Johnsontown, Berkeley County
- Johnsontown, Jefferson County
- Jones Springs
- Junction

== K ==
- Kabletown
- Kearneysville
- Kessel
- Ketterman
- Keyes Ferry Acres
- **Keyser***
- Kirby
- Kline

== L ==
- Lahmansville
- Largent
- Laurel Dale
- Leetown
- Lehew
- Levels
- Limestone
- Lineburg
- Little Cacapon
- Little Georgetown
- Loom
- Lost City
- Lost River

== M ==
- Macksville
- Magnolia
- Mannings
- Markwood
- Marlowe
- **Martinsburg***
- Mathias
- Maysville
- McCauley
- McNeill
- Mechanicsburg
- Mechanicstown
- Mechlenberg Heights
- Medley
- Meyerstown
- Middleway
- Milam
- Miles
- Millbrook
- Millen
- Milleson
- Millville
- Mitchell
- Moatstown
- Moler Crossroads
- **Moorefield***
- Mount Storm
- Mount Trimble
- Mountain Mission
- Moyers
- Mozer

== N ==
- Neals Run
- Needmore
- Nero
- Nethkin
- New Creek
- New Hope
- Nipetown
- Nollville
- North Berkeley
- North Mountain
- North River Mills

== O ==
- Oak Flat
- Oak Grove
- Oakland
- Oakmont
- Okonoko
- Old Arthur
- Old Fields
- Omps
- Onego
- Orleans Cross Roads

== P ==
- Pancake
- **Paw Paw**
- Patterson Creek
- Perry
- Peru
- **Petersburg***
- **Piedmont**
- Pikeside
- Pin Oak
- Pleasant Dale
- Propstburg
- Purgitsville

== R ==
- Rada
- Raven Rocks
- Reedson
- Reeses Mill
- Ridersville
- Ridge
- Ridgedale
- **Ridgeley**
- Ridgeway
- Rig
- Rio
- Rippon
- Riverside
- Riverton
- Rock Gap
- Rock Oak
- Rocket Center
- Rockland
- **Romney***
- Ruckman
- Ruddle
- Russelldale

== S ==
- Scherr
- Scrabble
- Sector
- Sedan
- Seneca Rocks
- Shanghai
- Shanks
- Shannondale
- Shenandoah Junction
- **Shepherdstown**
- Shiloh
- Short Gap
- Silver Grove
- Simoda
- Sir Johns Run
- Skeetersville
- Skyline
- Slanesville
- Sleepy Creek
- Smith Crossroads
- South Branch Depot
- Spring Mills
- Springfield
- Stohrs Crossroads
- Stotlers Crossroads
- Sugar Grove
- Sulphur City
- Summit Point
- Swan Pond

== T ==
- Tablers Station
- Tannery
- Tarico Heights
- Taylor
- Teterton
- Three Churches
- Tomahawk

== U ==
- Unger
- Union Corner
- Upper Tract
- Uvilla

== V ==
- Van Clevesville
- Vance
- Vanderlip
- Vanville

== W ==
- Wagoner
- Walnut Bottom
- Wappocomo
- **Wardensville**
- Wheatland
- Wiley Ford
- Williamsport
- Wilsonia
- Winebrenners Crossroad
- Woodmont
- Woodrow
- Wynkoop Spring

== Y ==
- Yellow Spring

== Z ==
- Zigler

== See also ==
- West Virginia
- List of cities in West Virginia
- List of villages in West Virginia
- List of census-designated places in West Virginia
