= List of cities and towns along the Potomac River =

This is a list of cities, towns, and communities along the Potomac River and its branches in the United States.

== Potomac River ==
=== Alphabetically ===
- Alexandria, Virginia
- Arlington, Virginia
- Belle Haven, Virginia
- Bolivar, West Virginia
- Brookmont, Maryland
- Brunswick, Maryland
- Cabin John, Maryland
- Campbells, West Virginia
- Carderock, Maryland
- Cherry Run, West Virginia
- Colonial Beach, Virginia
- Cumberland, Maryland
- Dahlgren, Virginia
- Darnestown, Maryland
- Fairview Beach, Virginia
- Falling Waters, West Virginia
- Forest Heights, Maryland
- Fort Belvoir, Virginia
- Fort Hunt, Virginia
- Fort Washington, Maryland
- Georgetown, District of Columbia
- Glen Echo, Maryland
- Great Cacapon, West Virginia
- Great Falls, Virginia
- Green Ridge, West Virginia
- Groveton, Virginia
- Hancock, Maryland
- Hancock, West Virginia
- Hansrote, West Virginia
- Harpers Ferry, West Virginia
- Huntington, Virginia
- Indian Head, Maryland
- Jerome, West Virginia
- Langley, Virginia
- Leesburg, Virginia
- Lewisetta, Virginia
- Lineburg, West Virginia
- Little Cacapon, West Virginia
- Little Georgetown, West Virginia
- Little Orleans, Maryland
- Loudoun Heights, Virginia
- Magnolia, West Virginia
- Mason Neck, Virginia
- McLean, Virginia
- Morgantown, Maryland
- Mount Vernon, Virginia
- Okonoko, West Virginia
- Orleans Cross Roads, West Virginia
- Paw Paw, West Virginia
- Point Lookout, Maryland
- Point of Rocks, Maryland
- Potomac, Maryland
- Potomac Heights, Maryland
- Quantico, Virginia
- River Creek, Virginia
- Shepherdstown, West Virginia
- Sir Johns Run, West Virginia
- Sleepy Creek, West Virginia
- South Branch Depot, West Virginia
- Sterling, Virginia
- Town Creek, Maryland
- Travilah, Maryland
- Washington, D.C.
- Williamsport, Maryland
- Woodmont, West Virginia

=== Alphabetically by state ===
==== District of Columbia ====
- Georgetown
- Washington

==== Maryland ====
- Brookmont
- Brunswick
- Cabin John
- Carderock
- Darnestown
- Forest Heights
- Fort Washington
- Glen Echo
- Hancock
- Indian Head
- Little Orleans
- Morgantown
- Point Lookout
- Point of Rocks
- Potomac
- Potomac Heights
- Town Creek
- Travilah
- Williamsport

==== Virginia ====
- Alexandria
- Arlington
- Belle Haven
- Colonial Beach
- Dahlgren
- Dale City
- Fairview Beach
- Fort Belvoir
- Fort Hunt
- Great Falls
- Groveton
- Huntington
- Langley
- Leesburg
- Lewisetta
- Loudoun Heights
- Mason Neck
- McLean
- Mount Vernon
- Quantico
- Woodbridge

==== West Virginia ====
- Bolivar
- Campbells
- Cherry Run
- Falling Waters
- Great Cacapon
- Green Ridge
- Hancock
- Hansrote
- Harpers Ferry
- Lineburg
- Little Cacapon
- Little Georgetown
- Magnolia
- Okonoko
- Orleans Cross Roads
- Paw Paw
- Shepherdstown
- Sir Johns Run
- Sleepy Creek
- South Branch Depot
- Woodmont

Moorefield West Virginia

== North Branch Potomac River ==
=== Alphabetically ===
- Barnum, West Virginia
- Bayard, West Virginia
- Beryl, West Virginia
- Blaine, West Virginia
- Bloomington, Maryland
- Bowling Green, Maryland
- Carpendale, West Virginia
- Cresaptown, Maryland
- Cumberland, Maryland
- Dans Run, West Virginia
- Forge Hill, West Virginia
- Gorman, Maryland
- Gormania, West Virginia
- Green Spring, West Virginia
- Hampshire, West Virginia
- Henry, West Virginia
- Keyser, West Virginia
- Kitzmiller, Maryland
- Luke, Maryland
- McCoole, Maryland
- North Branch, Maryland
- Oldtown, Maryland
- Patterson Creek, West Virginia
- Piedmont, West Virginia
- Pinto, Maryland
- Potomac Park, Maryland
- Rawlings, Maryland
- Ridgeley, West Virginia
- Rocket Center, West Virginia
- Wagoner, West Virginia
- Westernport, Maryland
- Wiley Ford, West Virginia

=== Alphabetically by state ===
==== Maryland ====
- Bloomington
- Bowling Green
- Cresaptown
- Cumberland
- Gorman
- Kitzmiller
- Luke
- McCoole
- North Branch
- Oldtown
- Pinto
- Potomac Park
- Rawlings
- Westernport

==== West Virginia ====
- Barnum
- Bayard
- Beryl
- Blaine
- Carpendale
- Dans Run
- Forge Hill
- Gormania
- Green Spring
- Hampshire
- Henry
- Keyser
- Patterson Creek
- Piedmont
- Ridgeley
- Rocket Center
- Wagoner
- Wiley Ford

== South Branch Potomac River ==
=== Alphabetically ===
- Blue Grass, Virginia
- Blues Beach, West Virginia
- Cave, West Virginia
- Cunningham, West Virginia
- Durgon, West Virginia
- Fisher, West Virginia
- Franklin, West Virginia
- Glebe, West Virginia
- Grace, West Virginia
- Harper, West Virginia
- Hightown, Virginia
- Ketterman, West Virginia
- McNeill, West Virginia
- Moorefield, West Virginia
- New Hampden, Virginia
- Old Fields, West Virginia
- Pancake, West Virginia
- Petersburg, West Virginia
- Ridgedale, West Virginia
- Romney, West Virginia
- Ruddle, West Virginia
- Sector, West Virginia
- Upper Tract, West Virginia
- Vanderlip, West Virginia
- Wapocomo, West Virginia

=== Alphabetically by state ===
==== Virginia ====
- Blue Grass
- Forks of Waters
- Hightown
- New Hampden

==== West Virginia ====
- Blues Beach
- Cave
- Cunningham
- Durgon
- Fisher
- Franklin
- Glebe
- Grace
- Harper
- Johnson
- Ketterman
- McNeill
- Moorefield
- Old Fields
- Pancake
- Petersburg
- Ridgedale
- Romney
- Ruddle
- Sector
- Upper Tract
- Vanderlip
- Wapocomo

== North Fork South Branch Potomac River ==
=== Alphabetically ===
- Cabins, West Virginia
- Cherry Grove, West Virginia
- Circleville, West Virginia
- Hopeville, West Virginia
- Macksville, West Virginia
- Riverton, West Virginia
- Seneca Rocks, West Virginia

== South Fork South Branch Potomac River ==
=== Alphabetically ===
- Brake, West Virginia
- Fame, West Virginia
- Fort Seybert, West Virginia
- Milam, West Virginia
- Moorefield, West Virginia
- Oak Flat, West Virginia
- Palo Alto, Virginia
- Peru, West Virginia
- Propstburg, West Virginia
- Sugar Grove, West Virginia
- Tannery, West Virginia

=== Alphabetically by state ===
==== Virginia ====
- Palo Alto

==== West Virginia ====
- Brake
- Fame
- Fort Seybert
- Milam
- Moorefield
- Oak Flat
- Peru
- Propstburg
- Sugar Grove
- Tannery
