= List of crossings of the Potomac River =

This is a list of bridges and other crossings of the Potomac River and its North and South branches. Within each section, crossings are listed from the source moving downstream.

== Potomac River ==
This list contains only crossings of the main channel. See also Washington Channel#Crossings and Boundary Channel#Crossings.

Bridge	Route	Location	Coordinates
West Virginia / Maryland
Paw Paw Bridge	WV 9 MD 51	Paw Paw / Allegany County	
abandoned rail bridge	Western Maryland Railway		
abandoned rail bridge	Western Maryland Railway		
Upper Magnolia Cut Off Bridge	CSX Cumberland Subdivision	Magnolia / Allegany County	
Lower Magnolia Cut Off Bridge	CSX Cumberland Subdivision	Magnolia / Allegany County	
abandoned rail bridge	Western Maryland Railway		
abandoned rail bridge	Western Maryland Railway		
abandoned rail bridge	Western Maryland Railway		
abandoned rail bridge	Western Maryland Railway		
US 522 Bridge	US 522	Morgan County / Hancock	
Lurgan Subdivision Bridge	CSX Lurgan Subdivision		
US 11 Bridge	US 11	Falling Waters / Williamsport	
I-81 Potomac River Bridge	I-81	Falling Waters / Williamsport	
Railroad Bridge		Berkeley County / Williamsport	
James Rumsey Bridge	WV 480; MD 34	Shepherdstown / Washington County	
Shepherdstown Railroad Bridge	Norfolk Southern	Shepherdstown / Washington County	
Old B&O Mainline Bridge	CSX Cumberland Subdivision	Harper's Ferry / Washington County	
Shenandoah Sub Bridge	CSX Shenandoah Subdivision	Harper's Ferry / Washington County	
Bollman Truss Bridge (abutments)	CSX	Harper's Ferry / Washington County	
Virginia / Maryland
Sandy Hook Bridge	US 340	Loudoun Heights / Washington County	
Brunswick Bridge	SR 287; MD 17	Lovettsville / Brunswick	
Point of Rocks Bridge	US 15	Loudoun County / Point of Rocks	
White's Ferry	SR 655; MD 107	Loudoun County / Montgomery County	
American Legion Memorial Bridge	I-495 (Capital Beltway)	Fairfax County / Montgomery County	38°58′09″N 77°10′46″W
Virginia / District of Columbia
Chain Bridge	SR 123; Clara Barton Parkway	Arlington / Washington, D.C.	38°55′47″N 77°06′59″W
Francis Scott Key Bridge	US 29	Arlington / Georgetown	38°54′09″N 77°04′12″W
Rosslyn Tunnel	Washington Metro Blue Line (Washington Metro) Orange Line (Washington Metro) Silver Line (Washington Metro)	Arlington / Georgetown	
Theodore Roosevelt Bridge	I-66 / US 50	Arlington / Washington, D.C.	38°53′32″N 77°03′36″W
Arlington Memorial Bridge		Washington, D.C.	38°53′14″N 77°03′20″W
George Mason Memorial Bridge	I-395 south / US 1 south	Arlington / Washington, D.C.	38°52′34″N 77°03′32″W
Rochambeau Memorial Bridge	I-395 (HOV)	Arlington / Washington, D.C.	38°52′33″N 77°02′30″W
Arland D. Williams Jr. Memorial Bridge	I-395 north / US 1 north	Arlington / Washington, D.C.	38°52′31″N 77°02′25″W
Charles R. Fenwick Bridge	Washington Metro Yellow Line (Washington Metro)	Arlington / Washington, D.C.	38°52′29″N 77°02′23″W
Long Bridge	CSX RF&P Subdivision	Arlington / Washington, D.C.	38°52′28″N 77°02′19″W
Virginia / Maryland
Woodrow Wilson Bridge	I-95 / I-495 (Capital Beltway)	Alexandria / Prince George's County	38°47′36″N 77°01′59″W
Governor Harry W. Nice Memorial Bridge	US 301	King George County / Charles County	38°21′42″N 76°59′50″W

== North Branch Potomac River ==
=== Dams ===
Dam	Impoundment name	Location (WV/MD)	Coordinates
Jennings Randolph Dam	Jennings Randolph Lake	Mineral County / Garrett County	39°25′56″N 79°07′22″W
NewPage Dam		Mineral County / Luke	39°28′21″N 79°03′37″W
Cumberland Flood Control Dam		Ridgeley / Cumberland	39°38′55″N 78°45′57″W

=== Bridges ===
Bridge	Route	Location (WV/MD)	Coordinates
Kempton Bridge	CR 120 (Kempton Road)	/ Kempton	39°12′23″N 79°29′20″W
Wilson Bridge	CR 903 (Wilson Road)	Wilson	39°15′13″N 79°23′55″W
Bayard Bridge	CR 902 (Bayard-Corona Road)	Bayard /	39°16′27″N 79°22′11″W
US 50 Bridge	US 50 (Northwestern Turnpike)	Gormania / Gorman	39.29278°N 79.34472°W
rail bridge	CSX Thomas Subdivision		
Kitzmiller Bridge	WV 42; MD 38	Blaine / Kitzmiller	39°23′13″N 79°10′51″W
rail bridge	CSX Thomas Subdivision		
rail bridge	CSX Thomas Subdivision		
B&O Railroad Stone Arch Bridge	CSX Mountain Subdivision	Beryl / Bloomington	39.476912°N 79.068246°W
WV 46 Bridge	WV 46	Beryl / Bloomington	39.479292°N 79.068378°W
rail bridge	CSX Thomas Subdivision		
Abandoned Bridge		Piedmont	
NewPage Paper Bridge	NewPage Corporation paper mill	Piedmont / Luke	
Piedmont Bridge	WV 46	Piedmont / Westernport	
World War II Memorial Bridge	US 220	Keyser / McCoole	
21st B&O Railroad Bridge	CSX	Keyser	
Route 956 Bridge	WV 956; MD 956	Rocket Center / Pinto	39°33′44″N 78°50′52″W
Western Maryland Scenic Railroad Bridge	Western Maryland Scenic Railroad	Ridgeley / Cumberland	
Ridgeley Bridge	WV 28 Alt. (Bridge Street)	Ridgeley / Cumberland	
C&O Canal Parkway Bridge	WV 28 (C&O Canal Parkway)	Wiley Ford / Cumberland	39.62158°N 78.773828°W
rail bridge	CSX Cumberland Subdivision		
Oldtown Toll Bridge	CR 1 (Green Spring Road)	Green Spring / Oldtown	39.537382°N 78.613458°W

== South Branch Potomac River ==
Bridge	Route	Location	Coordinates
Virginia
	SR 640 (Blue Grass Valley Road)	Hightown	
	SR 641		
	SR 640 (Blue Grass Valley Road)	Blue Grass	
	US 220 (Potomac River Road)	Forks of Waters	
West Virginia
CR 25 Bridge	CR 25 (Moyers Gap Road)	Cave / Moatstown	38°33′42″N 79°25′46″W
Johnstown Road Bridge	CR 23 (Johnstown Road)	Franklin	38°36′32″N 79°21′12″W
Dickinson Mountain Road Connector Bridge	CR 2207 (Dickenson Mountain Road)	Franklin	38°38′09″N 79°20′15″W
CR 220/12 Bridge	CR 22012	Franklin	38°38′22″N 79°19′55″W
US 33 Bridge	US 33	Franklin	38°39′35″N 79°19′06″W
River Mountain Lane Bridge			
Squire Lane Bridge			
Schmucker Road Bridge	CR 11 (Schmucker Road)	Upper Tract	38°47′12″N 79°16′00″W
Upper Tract Bridge	US 220	Upper Tract	38°48′21″N 79°16′35″W
Petersburg Bridge	US 220	Petersburg	38°59′18″N 79°07′30″W
Petersburg Gap Bridge	US 220 / WV 28 / WV 55	Welton	39°00′10″N 79°04′46″W
Fisher Bridge	CR 13 (Fisher-Moorefield Road)	Fisher/Moorefield	39°03′01″N 78°59′35″W
Richard Lee "Dickie" Moyers Veterans Memorial Bridge	US 48	Moorefield	39°04′57″N 78°58′21″W
Old Fields Bridge	US 220 / WV 28	Old Fields	39°06′13″N 78°57′34″W
Sycamore Wooden Tressel	South Branch Valley Railroad	Sycamore	39°09′09″N 78°54′52″W
Sector-Glebe Bridge (Partially Destroyed)	CR 83 (Fleming-Sector Road)	Sector/Glebe	39°13′32″N 78°51′15″W
Romney Bridge	US 50 / WV 28	Romney	39°20′21″N 78°46′33″W
Valley View Wooden Tressel	South Branch Valley Railroad	Romney	39°21′14″N 78°45′57″W
Ridgedale Wooden Tressel	South Branch Valley Railroad	Ridgedale	39°24′56″N 78°43′48″W
John Blue Bridge	WV 28	Blues Beach	39°25′33″N 78°42′56″W
Millesons Mill Bridge	CR 3 (Springfield Pike)	Millesons Mill	39°26′50″N 78°39′14″W
B&O Railroad Bridge	B&O Railroad	Mouth, Green Spring	39°31′40″N 78°35′18″W

=== North Fork South Branch Potomac River ===
Listed heading downstream from source to mouth at the South Branch Potomac River.

Bridge	Route	Location (WV)	Coordinates
CR 19 Bridge South	CR 19 (Upper North Fork Road)	Cherry Grove	38°35′18″N 79°32′47″W
Bridge North	CR 19 (Upper North Fork Road)	Cherry Grove	38°37′20″N 79°32′20″W
Snowy Mountain Road Bridge	CR 17 (Snowy Mountain Road)	Cherry Grove	38°38′11″N 79°31′12″W
Teter Gap Road Bridge	CR 288 (Teter Gap Road)	Circleville	38°39′10″N 79°30′45″W
Circleville Bridge	WV 28	Circleville	38°40′20″N 79°29′23″W
Judy Gap Bridge	US 33 / WV 28	Judy Gap	38°42′24″N 79°27′56″W
Riverton Bridge	CR 9 (Germany Valley Road)	Riverton	38°44′35″N 79°26′09″W
Germany Valley Limestone Bridge	CR 55 (Germany Valley Limestone Road)	Macksville	38°47′17″N 79°24′25″W
Harper Gap Road Bridge	CR 9 (Harper Gap Road)	Macksville	38°48′41″N 79°23′35″W
Roy Gap Road Bridge	CR 283 (Roy Gap Road)	Seneca Rocks	38°49′56″N 79°22′23″W
Smoke Hole Road Bridge	CR 2811 (Smoke Hole Road)	Cabins	38°59′04″N 79°14′02″W

=== South Fork South Branch Potomac River ===
Bridge	Route	Location	Coordinates
Virginia
	SR 614 (Cowpasture River Road N.)		38.4153°N 79.3774°W
	SR 614 (Cowpasture River Road N.)	Palo Alto	38.4235°N 79.3706°W
West Virginia
	Sweetwater Spring Road		
	Buck Hill Lane		
	driveway		
	Harveys Lane		
	CR 30 (Brushy Fork Road)		38.4769°N 79.3288°W
	CR 217 (Stony Run Flats)		
	CR 216 (Big Stony Road)		
	driveway		
	CR 21 (Sugar Grove Road)	Sugar Grove	38.5130°N 79.3106°W
	Honeycomb Lane		
	Puffenbarger Lane		
	CR 214 (Mill Gap Road)		
	Propst Memories Lane		
	Propstburg Road		
	CR 2112 (Dickinson Mountain Road)		
	Cassell Lane		
	CR 2113 (Old Sugar Grove Road)	Brandywine	
	US 33 (Blue Gray Trail)	Brandywine	38.6310°N 79.2438°W
	CR 512 (Bolton Road)		
	Siple Lane		
	CR 34 (Conrad Road)	Oak Flat	38.6740°N 79.2030°W
	CR 3 (Sweedlin Valley Road)	Fort Seybert	38.6950°N 79.1906°W
	CR 33 (Corner Road)		
	CR 7 (South Fork Road)		39.0562°N 78.9704°W
	Zirk Farm Road		
	driveway		
	Peru Hollow Road		
	Alum Road		
	Blue Rock Lane		
	driveway		
	driveway		
	Bass Lane		
	CR 7 (South Fork Road)	Milam, West Virginia	38.7977°N 79.1078°W
	driveway		
	South Branch Valley Railroad	Moorefield	39.0533°N 78.9663°W
Wendell Del Hester Memorial Bridge	US 220 / WV 28 / WV 55 (S. Main Street)	Moorefield	39.0562°N 78.9704°W

== See also ==
- White's Ferry
- White's Ford
- Potomac Aqueduct Bridge
