= Ridgedale =

Ridgedale has multiple meanings, including:

- Ridgedale, Saskatchewan
- Ridgedale Center, a regional shopping mall in Minnetonka, Minnesota
- Ridgedale, Hampshire County, West Virginia
- Ridgedale, Missouri
- Ridgedale (also known as Washington Bottom Farm), the plantation of George W. Washington, a distant relative of George Washington
