= Bayard Bridge =

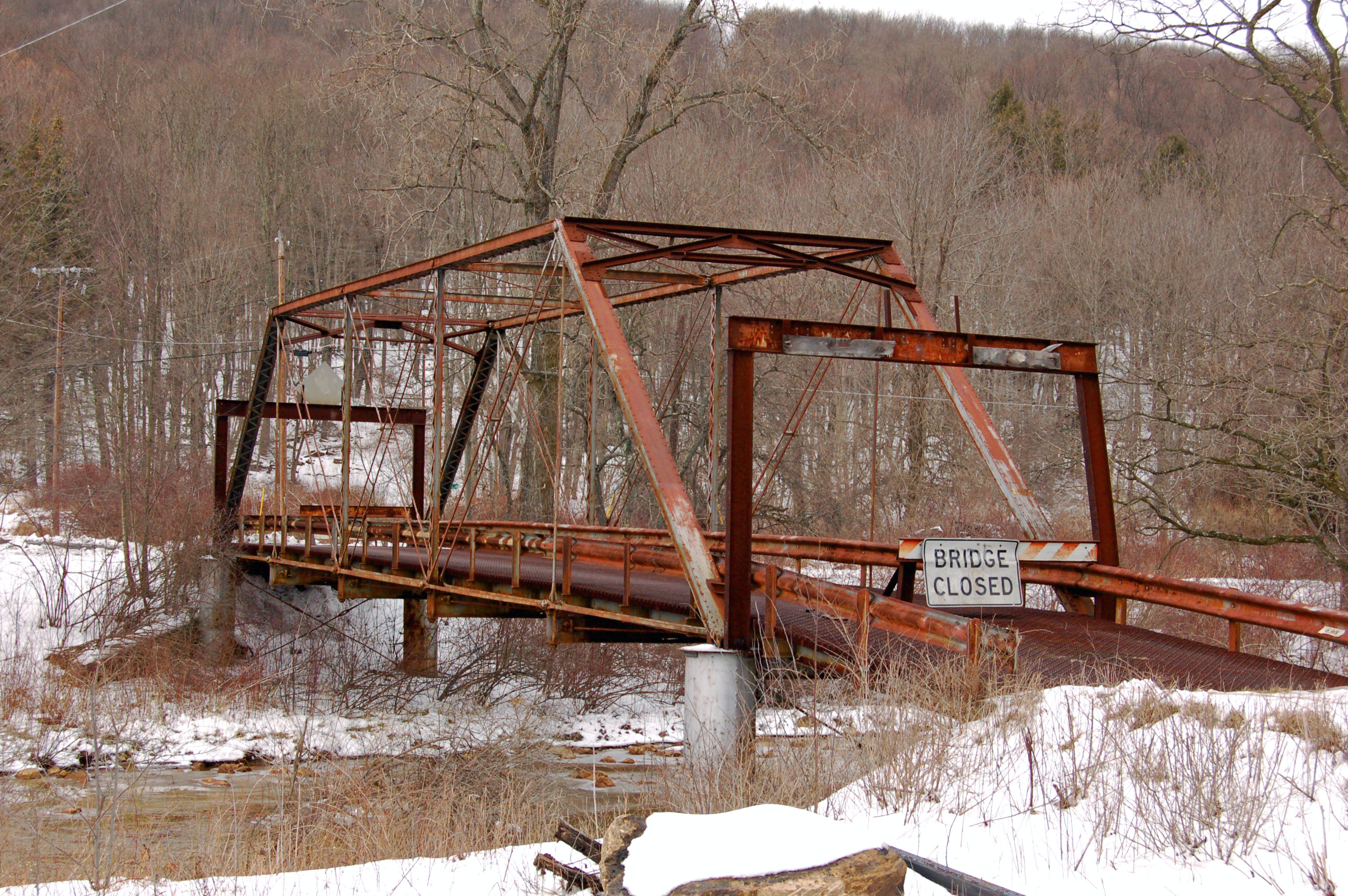
- Coordinates: 39°16′27″N 79°22′11″W
- Carries: CR 902
- Crosses: North Branch Potomac River
- Locale: Bayard, West Virginia
- Maintained by: West Virginia Division of Highways

Characteristics
- Design: through truss
- Material: Steel
- Total length: 124 feet (38 m)
- Width: 13 feet (4.0 m)
- No. of spans: 3

History
- Opened: pre-1900
- Closed: closed 1988

Statistics
- Daily traffic: closed

The Bayard Bridge is a crossing of the North Branch Potomac River between Grant County, West Virginia and Garrett County, Maryland. The bridge takes its name from the town of Bayard at its West Virginia end.

== History ==
According to West Virginia Division of Highways records, Bayard Bridge was built prior to 1900. The through truss span became limited by its narrow 13-foot (4.0 m) width, and the state decided to close this span along with ones at Dobbin and Henry in 1988.

== Replacement span ==
Since its closing, local citizens and businesses on both sides of the bridge have pushed for the construction of a replacement span at various times. As of 2008, there is a current campaign to acquire a new bridge.

== See also ==
- List of crossings of the Potomac River
