= Oak Flat =

Oak Flat may refer to:

- Oak Flat (Arizona)
- Oak Flat, West Virginia
- Oak Flat: A Fight for Sacred Land in the American West, a 2020 book by Lauren Redniss

== See also ==
- Oak Flats, New South Wales
