= Washington Bottom Farm =

Historic house in West Virginia, United States

- Ridgedale
- U.S. National Register of Historic Places
- U.S. Historic district
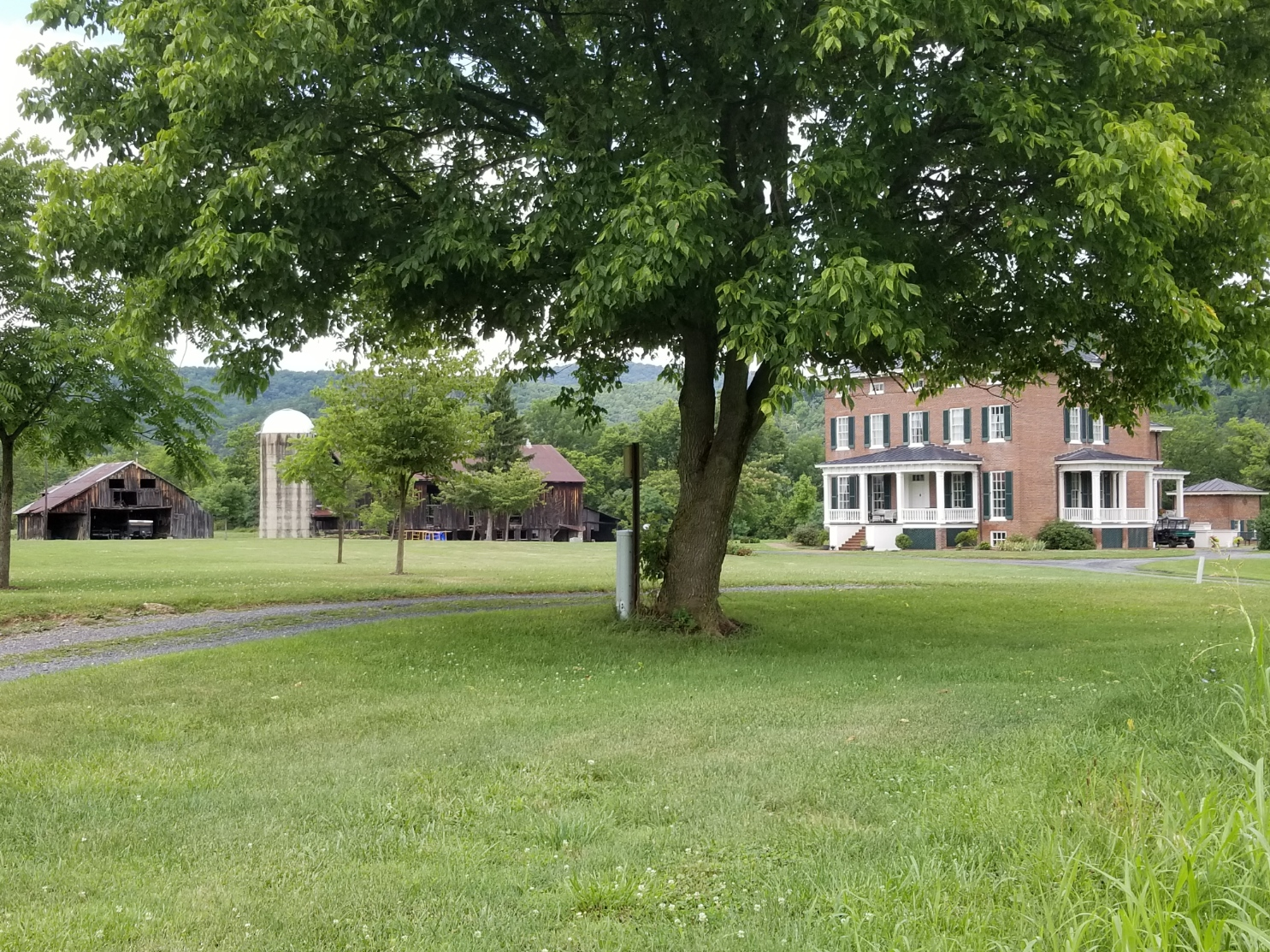

- Location within Eastern Panhandle of West Virginia Location within West Virginia Location within the United States
- Coordinates: 39°24′49″N 78°44′19″W
- Area: 251.6 acres (101.8 ha)
- Built: 1835
- Architectural style: Greek Revival
- NRHP reference No.: 01001328
- Added to NRHP: November 29, 2001

Ridgedale (also known as Washington Bottom Farm, Ridge Dale, and as the George W. Washington House and Farm) is a 19th-century Greek Revival plantation house and farm on a plateau overlooking the South Branch Potomac River north of Romney, West Virginia, United States. The populated area adjacent to Washington Bottom Farm is known as Ridgedale. The farm is connected to West Virginia Route 28 via Washington Bottom Road (West Virginia Secondary Route 28/3).

Ridgedale, constructed in 1835, was the residence of gentleman farmer George William Washington, a descendant of George Washington's great-great-grandfather Reverend Lawrence Washington. The farm is currently a private residence.

== Architecture ==
The main residence at Ridgedale farm is a high-style Greek Revival structure. The three-story brick house stands on a brick foundation and has an L-shaped plan. The house has a hip roof with a central square cupola and a widow's walk. The cupola has a window on each side with a 4 over 4 double-hung sash, and brackets under the roof edge. On the roof are five chimneys, one at each corner and one in the back ell with a slightly flared edge of corbels at the top, and a recessed panel in the center face.

The front, or south elevation, has a center hipped wooden porch with steps. The porch has a spindled handrail, wooden posts and deck, and small brackets under the eave. The main entrance is centered with a single transom and has a Greek Revival feature of a wide trim piece over the doorway. The house has five bays on each floor. The windows on the house are all double-hung sash except for the third floor which has small lozenge windows of three vertical lights in the frieze section. With pine sills and brick lintels, the first floor windows are 6/9 sash and reach to the floor in the front two rooms. The second floor windows are 6/6 sash.

The residence's west elevation is divided into two sections with the front portion of the house and the rear ell. Each section has three bays on each floor with 6/6 sash windows on the first and second floor and lozenge windows on third floor of the front section. The rear ell is slightly set back from the facade and has a kitchen porch on the first floor with wooden posts. A lower level door leads into a basement room, and the first floor door leads into the kitchen. The basement windows are 3/3 sash windows

The north side of the ell is a blank brick wall with a single lower level entrance that has a brick stairwell and original beaded door. The north side of the main house has two 6/6 sash windows.

The east façade of the house has the front portion to the left with a small center porch which matches the details on the front porch with wooden posts and a spindled handrail. There are small brackets under the eave and lattice covers the area under the porch. The porch is accessed from the two 6/9 sash windows from the front and back room, which reach to the floor. Above these openings are two 6/9 sash windows on the second floor and lozenge windows at the third floor. The right side of the house is recessed back for the rear ell which has a two-story porch. The porches were enclosed in the 1940s with glass windows, and were updated in 2010 with 4/4 casement windows and transoms and brick stairs. The wooden floor remains in its original condition.

The interior of the residence has good integrity with original wooden floors, wooden trim, a wide center hall with curved stairs, 12'ceilings, and six panel doors, some of which have graining. The trim on the second floor with 11' ceilings is simpler with narrow closets in the bedrooms having been added after 1939. The doorways on this floor have transoms opening into the hallway. 2 bathrooms were added at the front end of the hall with pocket doors and transoms. The 3rd floor has 9' ceilings which angle and the low lozenge windows and face nailed pine floor. A narrow dog-leg stairway leads to the cupola and a door opens out to the widow's walk. A dog-leg stairway also connects to the second floor of the rear porch.

== History ==
=== Fort Williams ===
The land on which Ridgedale Farm is located can be traced back to Thomas Fairfax, 6th Lord Fairfax of Cameron, as can many of the large tracts in the Eastern Panhandle of West Virginia. It was surveyed around 1749 by George Washington. The farm was first settled in 1725 by Peter Peters. On the parcel was located Fort Williams, established as a settler's fort in 1756 by Richard Williams. Williams and his family were living on the plantation of his father-in-law Peter Peters on the South Branch Potomac River in 1755 at the time of a Native American attack. Williams built his fort, Fort Williams, after he arrived home from Native American captivity, in the spring of 1756. From documentation, it appears to have been a settlers fort, although militia were stationed there at times during the course of the French and Indian War. In the spring of 1758, troops were temporarily stationed at the fort, probably under the order of Captain Thomas Wagoner, of the Virginia Regiment who was authorized by General George Washington to man any settler forts which were in need of support. No archaeological evidence has been discovered for the fort which is documented by deeds.

=== George W. Washington ===
George W. Washington (1809–1876) was the son of Edward Washington, a descendant of George Washington's great-great-grandfather Reverend Lawrence Washington, and was born near Pohick Church in Fairfax County, Virginia. He was well-educated and highly respected. He married Sarah (Sally) A. Wright (1811–1886) on February 19, 1830. She was the daughter of John Wright and his wife Rebecca Lockhart of Loudoun County, Virginia and the granddaughter of Major Robert Lockhart, a native of Lancaster County, Pennsylvania, where he served on the Committee of Public Safety in the American Revolution and was also a major in the county militia. Sarah Wright was born at "Wheatland" near Leesburg on April 22, 1811. She was educated at the Moravian Academy in Bethlehem, Pennsylvania. Major Robert Lockhart, her grandfather, devised Ridgedale and 700 acres (2.8 km^{2}) to Sarah, her brother, and sister in 1817. This land came into the ownership of George and Sarah after their marriage.

==== Establishment of Ridgedale ====
The couple moved to the Ridgedale and constructed the single pen log cabin around 1832 where they lived until the spacious Greek Revival main house was completed. As their family and resources grew, they added to the farm and constructed the main house in 1835. They had 11 children: Edward, John W., Rebecca, Esther (also known as Etta and Ettie), John, Betty, George, Robert, and Sallie. Son John W. and daughter Sallie died when less than two years old, and the second John died during the American Civil War in which his brother Edward also fought.

George W. Washington's agricultural practices included raising beef cattle, sheep, and pigs. He owned many horses, including two registered Percheron mares. Most of his horses were purchased in England and brought to the farm. He grew corn, hay, soybeans, oats, wheat, and flax. He sold cured and fresh pork, along with corn, wool, and vegetables for farm income. The earliest standing farm outbuilding was constructed around 1850. If earlier log barns existed, their sites are unknown. A newspaper account from December 25, 1907, tells of the loss by fire of an "immense basement barn." It is the following year that new silos were added to two other existing barns.

Washington kept a daily journal from 1832 to 1876 which provides a few glimpses into life on the farm. He owned approximately 300 sheep, often bought and sold cattle and horses, and owned a team of oxen and mules. He tells of chopping ice from the river in January 1868 and storing it in the icehouse. The bottom land behind the house, which totaled over 200 acres (0.81 km^{2}), was planted in hay and corn. The field in front of the house was called "the little meadow." Corn was grown in the bottom land, and timothy-grass grown and harvested in the meadow. Washington speaks of the ridge, known as Middle Ridge (geologically a continuation of Mill Creek Mountain), which was used to pasture his cattle and sheep. This section is no longer part of the farm. Corn was also grown and harvested from a high water island in the South Branch Potomac River known simply as "the island." It totals approximately 30 acres (12 ha), and not reachable by equipment is no longer farmed. Washington also kept bulls on a feed lot, near the barn area. This lot was used for feeding the dairy cattle into the 1950s by the Brinker family.

==== Slavery ====
George W. Washington and his family owned 16 slaves in 1850, and 20 are listed on the 1860 slave schedule census. Washington had inherited seven slaves in his father Edward's will dated April 8, 1813: Jesse, Duke, Reuben, Ella, Letty Seals, Jemima Seals, and Alfred.

William Bias, one of the Washington family's slaves, and his wife Ann, took the surname Washington and were conveyed by Susan Blue Parsons 2 acres (8,100 m^{2}) from Wappocomo plantation on November 7, 1874. William and Ann Washington's home, known as Washington Place, was one of the first residences in Hampshire County built by freed slaves. William Washington later acquired other properties on the hills north of Romney along what is now West Virginia Route 28 and became the first African-American land developer in the state of West Virginia. One of his subdivisions is the "Blacks Hill" neighborhood of Romney, adjacent to the Washington Place homestead.

==== American Civil War ====
===== "Camp Washington" =====
Ridgedale was the scene of activity during the American Civil War. Companies of cavalry camped in the yard, which they dubbed "Camp Washington." The Washington family hid Confederate soldiers in the house. Early in Summer 1861, Confederate General Turner Ashby and his command occupied a position on the South Branch Potomac River "upon the estate of Col. George Washington." According to Washington family tradition, General Ashby had his headquarters at or near Ridgedale. As a compliment to George W. Washington, Ashby named his headquarters "Camp Washington." His brother, Captain Richard Ashby, was carried on a litter to the Washington home at Ridgedale after he was mortally wounded at the Battle of Kelley's Island on June 28, 1861. Another account places Captain Ashby's mortal wounding by a bayonet thrust at a battle with Union forces at Dans Run along the Baltimore and Ohio Railroad on June 26, 1861. He was placed in a room associated with Ridgedale's ballroom and died there after about a week. He was cared for until he died on July 3, 1861. At his request, he was supposedly buried under an oak tree at the Indian Mound Cemetery in Romney. After the war, he was reinterred with his brother Turner Ashby at Stonewall Cemetery in Winchester, Virginia, in 1866. Their grave is marked "The Brothers Ashby."

George W. Washington kept a journal of the happenings of this period, which has preserved valuable information concerning the period of the American Civil War in Hampshire County. Washington's sons, Edward and John, both joined the Hampshire Guards before the American Civil War began, and left for Harpers Ferry in May 1861. John was killed in the Battle of Cold Harbor the following year. His son Edward was wounded in the Battle of Antietam and acted as a courier for Generals Stonewall Jackson and Jubal Anderson Early and later took part in the capture of General George Crook and Benjamin Franklin Kelley when he acted as a guide for the McNeill's Rangers. Two of Edward's sisters, Rebecca and Etta, were sent from Hampshire County to carry a message to General Jackson, then stationed near Winchester, that the Union forces were in possession of Romney. They rode horseback for their entire journey and carried the message under the saddle.

===== Southern Methodist support =====
Washington was an early supporter of the Southern Methodists in Hampshire County, of which he alludes to in his 1868 journal. He was one of the trustees who purchased land in 1851 in the town of Springfield to construct a church building for the Methodist Episcopal Church South, after Methodists split into northern and southern factions in 1846. Washington states that he and his family had not been able to attend the Springfield Methodist Church while it was in the process of being repaired after the American Civil War.

=== Robert M. Washington ===
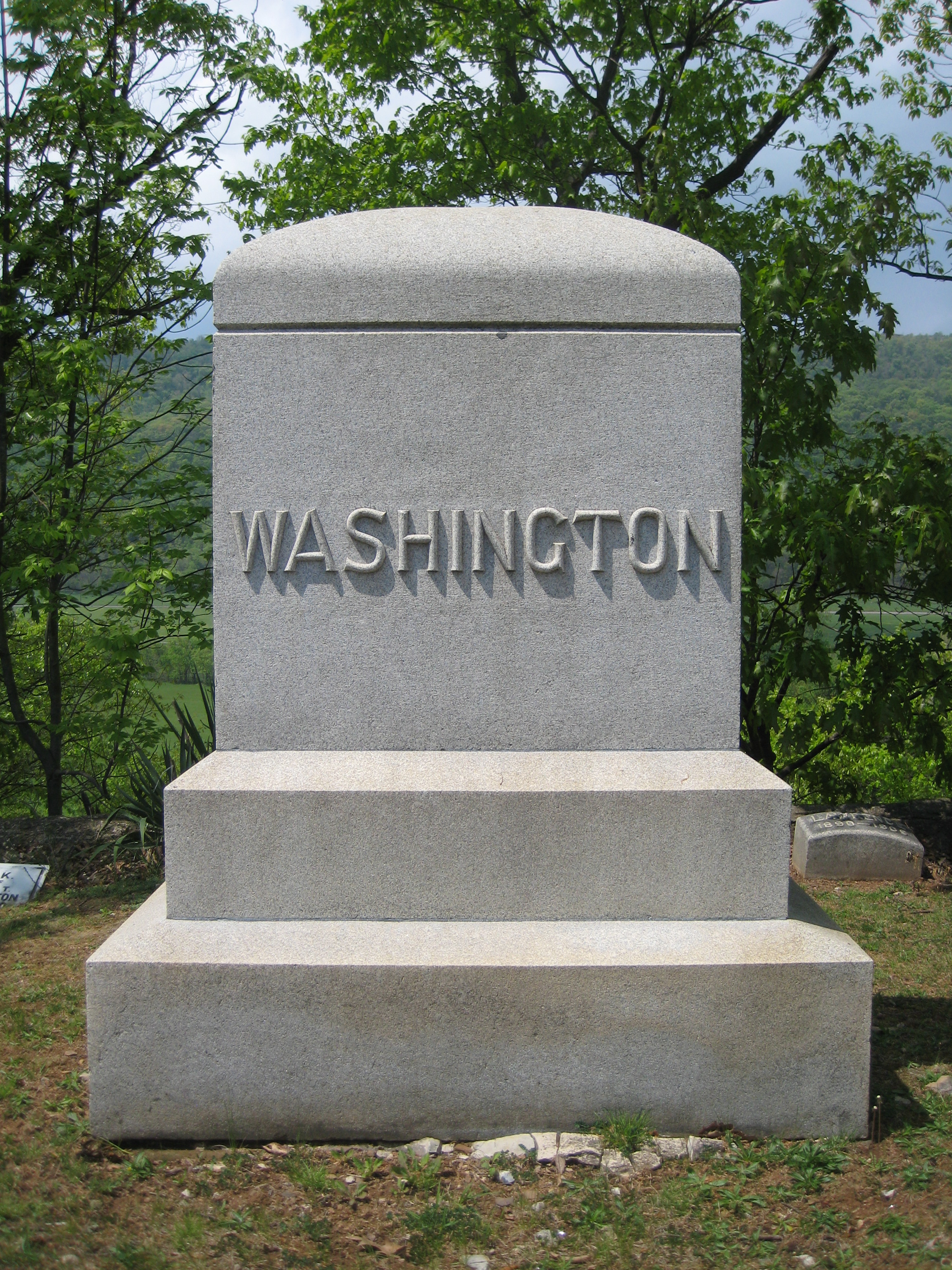
The Washington family burial plot in Indian Mound Cemetery in Romney, West Virginia.

George W. Washington died on February 6, 1876, and his will was proved four days later. His wife Sally died in 1886. They are buried at Indian Mound Cemetery in Lot 78 in Romney. The farm continued in son Robert's hands when he purchased it in January 1879 from the other heirs and devisees of his father. Those signing the conveyance were the following: his mother Sally; Edward Washington and his wife Susan; James B. Rees and wife Rebecca (Washington); Ettie Washington; George W. Washington and wife Ann E.; John J. Inskeep and wife Bettie Washington; and Sallie G. Washington. Robert retained ownership of the farm until his death in 1930. Approximately 500 acres (2.0 km^{2}) of the farm were sold in 1936 by Washington's heirs to the Brinker brothers of Cumberland, Maryland.

==== Baltimore and Ohio Railroad ====
The Baltimore and Ohio Railroad built a line near the farm in 1883. This line served the communities from Green Spring, West Virginia, to Petersburg. The railroad had a siding on the farm to drop supplies as needed, such as fencing and other materials. This was in place until 1930. The South Branch Valley Railroad continues to operate on the old Baltimore and Ohio line near Washington Bottom Farm.

=== Brinker family ===
Brothers Fred, George, and Joseph Brinker had owned a machinery dealership in Cumberland. They converted the horse barn into a dairy barn and began to operate a dairy business in 1940. In 1943, Fred's son Charles W. and wife Dorothy and two children moved from Baltimore, Maryland, to Springfield, West Virginia, to help operate the dairy farm. In 1950, they purchased a half interest, and after the accidental farm-related death of Fred Brinker, they acquired the remaining interest in the farm from family members. Charles and Dorothy Brinker lived at the farm for fifty years and operated the dairy with the help of their four children: Fred, Maryann, Robert, and Terry.

Washington Bottom Farm was then owned by Robert C. Brinker and his wife, Loretta. With their sons, Matthew and Michael, the farm was expanded in fall 2001, and the dairy was returned to operation. A milking parlor was installed in the original horse barn to handle 400 head of Holstein cattle. The main crops harvested were corn and hay to support the herd. This operation continued until 2003 when the farm was sold to Carol and Mike Shaw. Although the farm once had 700 acres (2.8 km^{2}), it now has a total of 321 acres (1.30 km^{2}) associated with the early residence and farm buildings.

Since the Shaw's purchased the farm, Ridgedale has undergone an extensive restoration project partially funded from both the West Virginia Division of Culture and History and the United States Department of the Interior through the National Park Service. The Shaw's use the home as their private residence and give tours upon request.

== Archaeology ==
A small Indian mound, is to the east of the house.

== See also ==
- List of historic sites in Hampshire County, West Virginia
- National Register of Historic Places listings in Hampshire County, West Virginia
