= Thomas Subdivision =

Railway line in Maryland and West Virginia

Overview
- Status: Active
- Owner: CSX Transportation
- Locale: West Virginia, Maryland
- Termini: Keyser; Bayard

Service
- Type: Freight rail
- System: CSX Transportation
- Operator(s): CSX Transportation (1986-Present) Chessie System (1973-1986) * Note the WM was under the control of the Chessie System at that time Western Maryland Railway (1905-1983) West Virginia Central and Pittsburg Railway (1880-1905)

Technical
- Line length: 44.2 mi
- Number of tracks: 1
- Track gauge: 4 ft 8 1/2 in (1,435 mm) standard gauge

The Thomas Subdivision is a railroad line owned by CSX Transportation in the U.S. states of Maryland and West Virginia. The line runs from Rawlings, Maryland, to Bayard, West Virginia, for a total of 44.2 miles (71.1 km). At its east end the line continues west from the Mountain Subdivision and at its west end the line comes to an end.

The line was built by the West Virginia Central and Pittsburg Railway (WVC&P) in the 1880s, and originally ran between Cumberland, Maryland and Elkins, West Virginia. The WVC&P was later merged with the Western Maryland Railway (WM) in 1905. The WM abandoned portions of the line between the 1930s and 1970s. The WM was merged into the Chessie System in 1973, and the latter merged into CSX Transportation in 1980.

== See also ==
- List of CSX Transportation lines
- Western Maryland Railway
