= Bowers House (Sugar Grove, West Virginia) =

Historic house in West Virginia, United States

- U.S. National Register of Historic Places
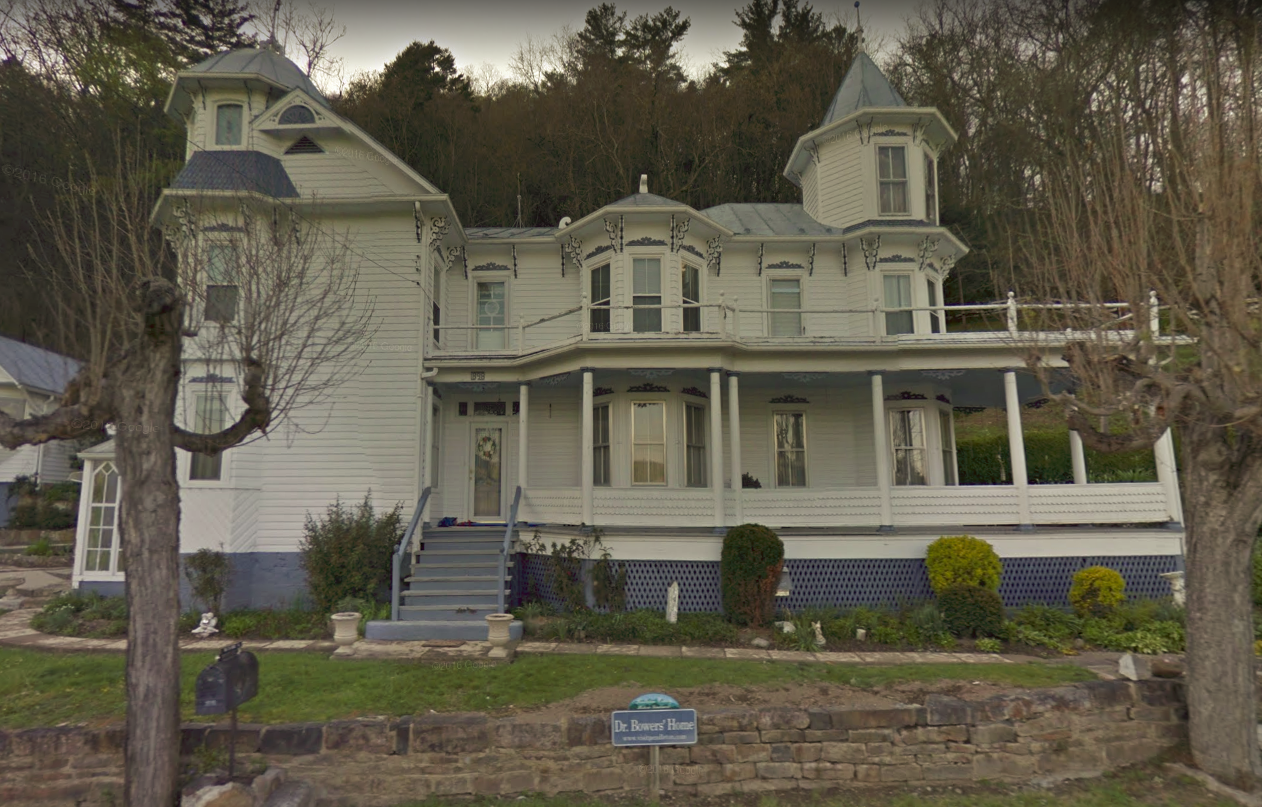

- Location within West Virginia Location within the United States
- Location: Brandywine-Sugar Grove Rd., Sugar Grove, West Virginia
- Coordinates: 38°30′43″N 79°18′37″W
- Area: less than one acre
- Built: 1898
- Architectural style: Queen Anne
- MPS: South Branch Valley MRA
- NRHP reference No.: 85001593
- Added to NRHP: July 10, 1985

Bowers House is a historic home located in Sugar Grove, West Virginia. It was built in 1898 and is a large, 2 1/2-story Queen Anne style frame dwelling. It features two asymmetrical polygonal towers, contrasting wood siding in a herringbone pattern, projecting gables and bays, and large brackets with contrasting color schemes.

It was listed on the National Register of Historic Places in 1985.
