= Sir Johns Run =

Tributary stream of the Potomac River in Morgan County, West Virginia

Coordinates: 39°39′05″N 78°14′17″W

Sir Johns Run is an 8.9-mile-long (14.3 km) tributary stream of the Potomac River in Morgan County, West Virginia. For most of its course, Sir Johns Run is a shallow non-navigable stream. It rises on the eastern flanks of Cacapon Mountain and from its source, flows north with Cacapon Mountain to its west and Warm Spring Ridge to its east. During its flow northward through the valley, Sir Johns Run is joined by a number of smaller spring-fed streams. Sir Johns Run empties into the Potomac River at the small community of the same name, Sir Johns Run. The stream takes its name from Sir John St. Clair, a deputy quartermaster present during General Edward Braddock's expedition through the area during the French and Indian War.

Steamboat inventor James Rumsey operated a mill on Sir Johns Run in the late 18th century. Rumsey and his brother-in-law, Joseph Barnes, tested a steamboat at the mouth of the stream.

== See also ==
- List of West Virginia rivers
