= Allegany Ballistics Laboratory =

Industrial complex in Rocket Center, West Virginia

Coordinates: 39°33′40″N 78°50′5″W

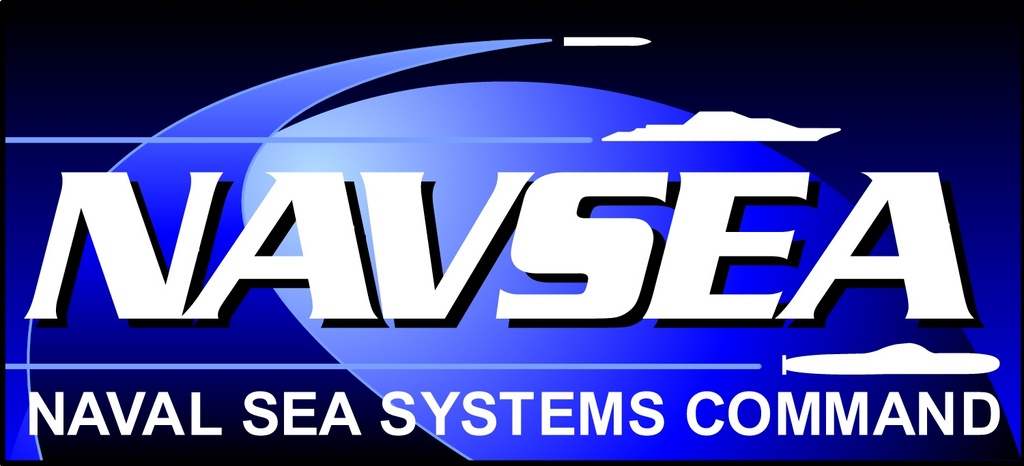
- Industry: Manufacturer of composite materials, military products
- Founded: 1944
- Headquarters: Rocket Center, West Virginia, United States
- Number of employees: 1,000
- Parent: Northrop Grumman, formerly ATK
- Website: www.atk.com

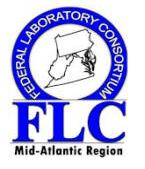

Allegany Ballistics Laboratory (ABL) located in Rocket Center, West Virginia, is a diverse industrial complex employing some 1,000 people across 1,628 acres (6.59 km^{2}). The facility is a member of the Federal Laboratory Consortium and is operated by Northrop Grumman (former Alliant Techsystems) under contract with the Naval Sea Systems Command (NAVSEA).

== Current operation ==
The ABL facility is a manufacturer of advanced composite structures for the F-22 Raptor and other aerospace projects. ATK also operates 6 of 11 known advanced fiber placement machines. In addition the site produces about 80 military products, including: 30mm shells for Apache helicopters, training grenades, fuze-proximity sensors, mortars and warheads, and tank ammunition.

Also on the site is the Robert C. Byrd Hilltop Office Complex and the Robert C. Byrd Institute for Advanced Flexible Manufacturing. At the Robert C. Byrd Complex on the hill companies have rented space to do secure research, among them IBM (which recently acquired National Interest Security Company) who is digitizing data on hurricane cleanup, avian influenza, and weather records.

It also plays a significant role in continuity of government operations.

== History ==
ABL was established in 1944 on the site of a former ammunitions plant on land owned by the Army. After World War II, the plant was transferred to the Office of Scientific Research and Development and was involved in building propulsion devices and engines for the solid-rocket industry.

Later in the decade, ownership of ABL was transferred to the Navy office of Naval Sea Systems Command. Since 1946 it was operated by the Hercules Powder Company. In 1956 when it was producing Altair rocket stages for Vanguard rockets, ABL was, "A subsidiary of the Navy operated by the Hercules Powder Company." The Navy now contracts out operation of the facility to ATK (Alliant Techsystems), a $3.4 billion corporation based in Edina, Minnesota.

In 1998, ATK's Conventional Munitions Group was selected by Lockheed Martin Aeronautical Systems to produce the fiber-placed composite pivot shaft assembly for the F-22 Raptor air-dominance fighter. Work on the production program was performed at Alliant's automated fiber placement production facility at the Allegany Ballistics Laboratory before the production of F-22 aircraft ended in 2012. The fiber placement facility was constructed as part of a $177 million renovation and restoration program funded by the U.S. Naval Sea Systems Command (NAVSEA), which owns the Allegany Ballistics Laboratory.

== Local Perception ==
As for the ecological impact, it is believed the facility contributes greatly to the pollution of the adjacent North Branch Potomac River. While this is unsupported, the company does have numerous runoff sites. Also, the groundwater in the surrounding community has been verified to contain many contaminants, although actions have since been taken to reduce these contaminants, and are part of a constant monitoring process.

== Companies ==
The following privately owned ventures are located on the ABL site:

Company	Description
Northrop Grumman Innovation Systems	Defense and Aerospace
Robert C. Byrd Institute	
International Business Machines	Information Management, Technology, and Strategic Consulting

== See also ==
- Barton Business Park
- North Branch Industrial Complex
- Upper Potomac Industrial Park
