= Charles Irving Elliott =

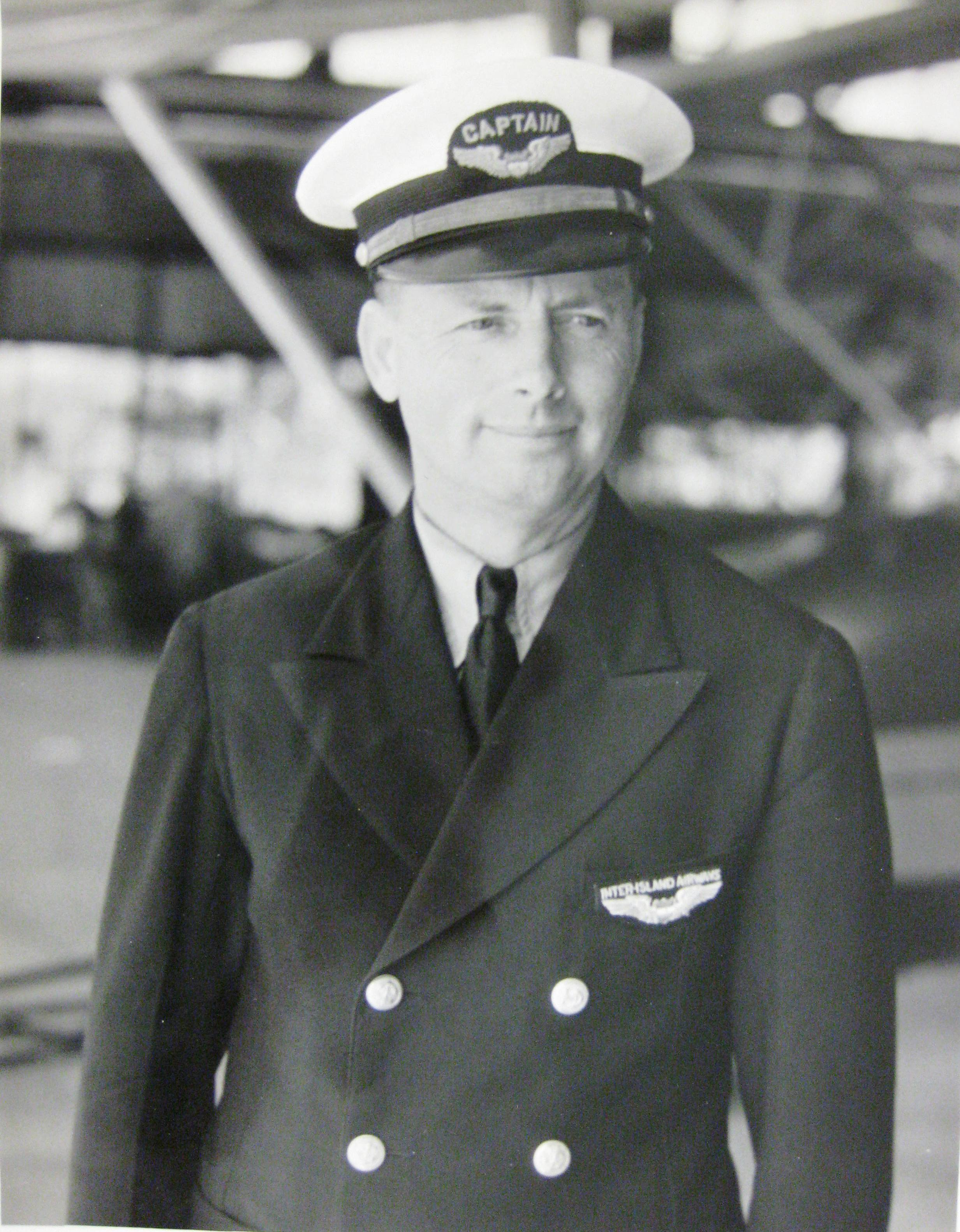
- Photo Courtesy of Hawaiian Airlines Archives
- Born: November 13, 1892; Barnum, West Virginia, US
- Died: July 5, 1972 age 79; Burbank, California, US
- Other name: "Captain Sam"
- Occupation: Chief Pilot
- Employer: Inter-Island Airways / Hawaiian Airlines
- Known for: Aviation pioneer in the Hawaiian Islands
- Spouses: Christine E. Benton, 1918–1961; Bertha Widmann, 1962–1972
- Military career
- Allegiance: United States
- Branch: United States Navy
- Service years: 1915-1929
- Rank: Chief Petty Officer Naval Aviation Pilot
- Conflicts: World War I

Charles Irving "Sam" Elliott (November 13, 1892 – July 5, 1972) was an American pioneer aviator in the Hawaiian Islands. As an airline pilot, he is credited with the first scheduled passenger flight between the Hawaiian Islands, the first scheduled airmail flight between the Hawaiian Islands, and the first scheduled cargo flight in the US/Hawaiian Islands.

== Early life ==
Elliott was born on November 13, 1892, in Barnum, West Virginia, to Fredrick and Susan (Blackburn) Elliott. Elliott had three younger sisters (Ruth, Lilly, and Myrtle) and two younger brothers (Francis and Donovan). His teenage years were spent in Seaside, Oregon, where he worked with his father as a carpenter. Elliott joined the US Navy in 1915 and married Christine E. Benton on Sept. 12, 1918 in San Diego, California.

== Naval career ==
Elliott was a carpenter's mate stationed at Rockwell Field on the San Diego Harbor. In 1919, Elliott applied for and was accepted into the Navy's flight training program offered to enlisted personnel. After graduation from flight school, he was selected to remain at the Pensacola Naval Air Station in Florida as a flight instructor. His next assignment was to fly scout planes off the Battleship USS Nevada. He was then assigned to Torpedo Plane Squadron #2 in San Diego, and made his connection to Hawaii when his unit was transferred to Naval Air Station Pearl Harbor in 1923. Being an enlisted man, Chief Petty Officer Elliott was referred to as a Naval Aviation Pilot, or AP for short.

== Airline career ==
In 1929, the newly formed Inter-Island Airways needed to hire a Chief Pilot to help begin flight operations. The founder of Inter-Island Airways, Stanley Kennedy Sr., flew Curtiss H-16 seaplanes for the US Navy in World War I. Due to his knowledge of their capabilities and the lack of suitable airports in Hawaii at the time, Kennedy wanted to hire a Chief Pilot with naval seaplane experience. Elliott was hired as Chief Pilot for Inter-Island Airways on August 1, 1929. Elliott's initial tasks were to oversee the construction of the company's hangar, hire new pilots, fly the company's Bellanca Pacemaker on sightseeing flights over Oahu, and prepare for the arrival of their Sikorsky S-38 amphibious aircraft from the factory in Connecticut. Kennedy and Elliott, both being WWI veterans, chose Armistice Day to be the inaugural day for scheduled air travel between the Hawaiian Islands.

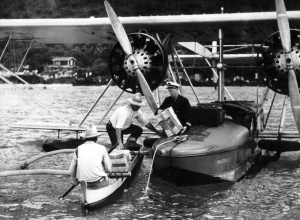
Captain Elliott in a S-38 on the bay at Kona, Hawaii (Courtesy of Hawaiian Airlines Archives)

=== First scheduled airline flight in the Hawaiian Islands ===
On November 11, 1929, Territorial Governor Lawrence M. Judd led the events attended by thousands of spectators for the first airline flight between the Hawaiian Islands. Betty Judd, the Governor's daughter, christened the two S-38's with bottles of Champaign and floral leis. Elliott captained the S-38 "Hawaii" with mate/mechanic Elmer Koski in lead-formation with the S-38 "Maui" captained by Carl Cover and mate/mechanic Leonard Fry. The two S-38's departed John Rodgers Field (now Honolulu International Airport) and met up with 49 military aircraft and the Inter-Island Airways Bellanca (flown by Darr Alkire) circling overhead to fly in formation past Honolulu and Waikiki, and then out to Diamond Head. The two S-38's continued on to Maui where they were met by "the greatest throng ever assembled with exception perhaps of the opening day of the county fair", wired the Honolulu Star-Bulletin.

The two S-38's soon departed Maui for their next leg to Hilo on the Island of Hawaii. Upon landing at Hilo, the Honolulu Star-Bulletin wired

public and official enthusiasm exceeding any similar demonstrations in the history of this island city...a vast crowd at the airport, drawn from all sections of the island in the realization that the flight opens a new era in Hawaii transportation...long before the arrival of the Sikorskys all sides of the Waiakea airport was lined by hundreds of automobiles. The report that the ships had been sighted over Hawi at 11:55am was the signal for a cheer.

=== First scheduled airmail flight in the Hawaiian Islands ===
Another milestone happened in Elliott's airline career on October 8, 1934. Territorial Governor Joseph Poindexter and Honolulu Postmaster Charles Chillingsworth led the ceremonies for the inaugural flight carrying airmail between the Hawaiian Islands. In New York City, Postmaster General James Farley extended his congratulations over a nationwide radio broadcast. Governor Poindexter handed the bags of mail up to Elliott and co-pilot James Hogg, then the S-38 "Maui" took off for Hilo introducing airmail service for the residents of Hawaii.

=== First scheduled cargo flight in the USA/Territory of Hawaii ===
During World War II, the inter-island cargo ships were commandeered into military service by the War Shipping Administration. This created a crisis for the people of Hawaii, as shipping had been the only means of transporting cargo between the islands. Hawaiian Airlines (Inter-Island Airways changed its name to Hawaiian Airlines in 1941) petitioned the Civil Aeronautics Board for authorization to fly air cargo flights between the islands. Hawaiian Airlines was rewarded with United States Air Cargo Certificate #1. On March 20, 1942, Elliott captained the first scheduled air cargo flight in the United States.

== Death and honors ==
Elliott retired from Hawaiian Airlines in 1951 and moved to the US mainland. Christine died in 1961, and on November 14, 1962, Elliott married Bertha Widmann in Las Vegas, Nevada. Elliott died in Burbank, California, on July 5, 1972, from a stroke at the age of 79. He is buried at Forest Lawn Memorial Park in Glendale, California.

- On November 11, 1964, the House of Representatives for the State of Hawaii named "Elliott Street" at the Honolulu International Airport in his honor
- On November 11, 2017, Hawaiian Airlines named its 21-acre "Charles I. Elliott Maintenance and Cargo Facility" in his honor
