= Raven Rocks, West Virginia =

- Unincorporated community
- Location within West Virginia Location within the United States
- Coordinates: 39°26′40″N 78°40′47″W
- Country: United States
- State: West Virginia
- County: Hampshire
- Time zone: UTC-5 (Eastern (EST))
  - Summer (DST): UTC-4 (EDT)
- GNIS feature ID: 1555443

Raven Rocks is an unincorporated community in Hampshire County within U.S. state of West Virginia. It lies on Springfield Pike (West Virginia Secondary Route 3) between the communities of Springfield and Millesons Mill.
