= Hampshire, West Virginia =

Hampshire
- Unincorporated community
- Location within the state of West Virginia Hampshire (the United States)
- Coordinates: 39°28′19″N 79°04′37″W
- Country: United States
- State: West Virginia
- County: Mineral
- Elevation: 1,056 ft (322 m)
- Time zone: UTC-5 (Eastern (EST))
  - Summer (DST): UTC-4 (EDT)
- GNIS feature ID: 1554633

Hampshire is an unincorporated community on the North Branch Potomac River in Mineral County, West Virginia, United States. It is part of the Cumberland, MD-WV Metropolitan Statistical Area. Hampshire is located to the south of Bloomington and to the west of Beryl.
