= New Hampden, Virginia =

Unincorporated community in Virginia, United States

- Unincorporated community
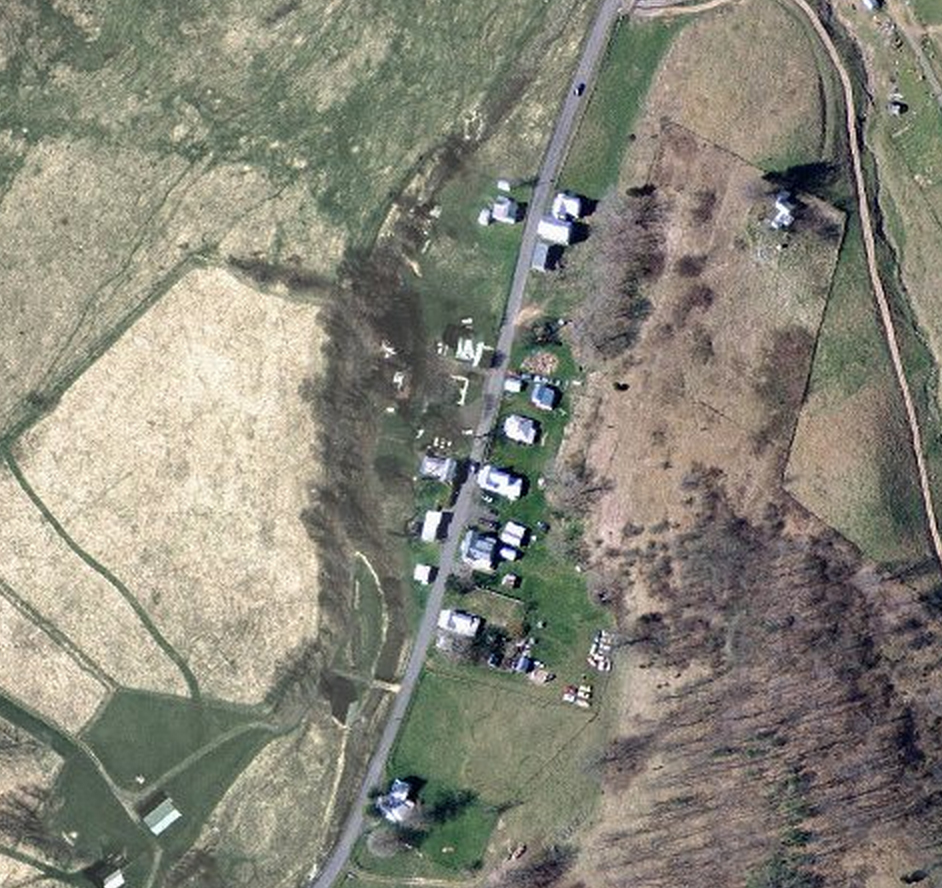
- Aerial view of New Hampden, Virginia

- Location within Virginia Location within the United States
- Coordinates: 38°29′34″N 79°33′48″W
- Country: United States
- State: Virginia
- County: Highland
- Elevation: 2,598 ft (792 m)
- Time zone: UTC−5 (Eastern (EST))
  - Summer (DST): UTC−4 (EDT)
- GNIS feature ID: 1496000

New Hampden is an unincorporated community in Highland County, Virginia, United States. New Hampden is located in the Blue Grass Valley on VA State Route 640, approximately 5.7 miles (9.2 km) north of Monterey. The community is situated on the banks of the South Branch Potomac River west of the northern end of Monterey Mountain and southwest of the community of Blue Grass and the Devils Backbone rock outcrop. The community appeared around 1858 and is characterized as having a "regular appearance" in contrast to more haphazardly developed villages. West of New Hampden is the site of a flint quarry used by Native Americans to procure sources of flint for the production of arrowheads. Some accounts state that the area was of such importance that it was considered to be neutral ground by the native tribes.

Located in New Hampden is a historic grist mill that began operations around 1816-1817 and ceased in 1944. The structure, originally known as the Rexrode Mill, still stands to the present day.
