= Wagoner, West Virginia =

Wagoner
- Unincorporated community
- Location within the state of West Virginia Wagoner (the United States)
- Coordinates: 39°32′17″N 78°40′20″W
- Country: United States
- State: West Virginia
- County: Mineral
- Elevation: 558 ft (170 m)
- Time zone: UTC-5 (Eastern (EST))
  - Summer (DST): UTC-4 (EDT)
- GNIS feature ID: 1555902

Wagoner is an unincorporated community in Mineral County, West Virginia, United States. Wagoner lies along the North Branch Potomac River at Round Bottom Hollow between the communities of Dans Run and Green Spring. Wagoner is located at the northern terminus of West Virginia Secondary Route 15/2.
