= Wilson, Maryland and West Virginia =

Unincorporated community in Maryland, United States

Wilson
- Unincorporated community
- Location within the state of West Virginia Wilson (the United States)
- Coordinates: 39°15′15″N 79°23′52″W
- Country: United States
- States: Maryland and West Virginia
- County: Garrett (Maryland) and Grant (West Virginia)
- Elevation: 2,493 ft (760 m)
- Time zone: UTC-5 (Eastern (EST))
  - Summer (DST): UTC-4 (EDT)
- GNIS feature ID: 1549992

Wilson is an unincorporated community located in both Garrett County, Maryland and Grant County, West Virginia, United States. Wilson is located along the North Branch Potomac River, 2 miles (3.2 km) southwest of Bayard. The West Virginia side of Wilson once had a post office, which closed on July 16, 1988.

George W. Wilson, an early postmaster, gave the community his name.
