= Campbells, West Virginia =

Unincorporated community in West Virginia, United States

Campbells
- Unincorporated community
- Location within the state of West Virginia Campbells (the United States)
- Coordinates: 39°37′5″N 78°24′42″W
- Country: United States
- State: West Virginia
- County: Morgan
- Time zone: UTC-5 (Eastern (EST))
  - Summer (DST): UTC-4 (EDT)
- GNIS feature ID: 1549618

Campbells is an unincorporated community in Morgan County in the U.S. state of West Virginia along the old Western Maryland Railroad line on the Potomac River. Campbells is accessible by way of Doe Gulley Lane (West Virginia Secondary Route 18/2) from Doe Gully to its east. Because of its past function as a station on the railroad, Campbells is a popular railfan site. Campbells and the remaining railroad buildings there are within the Chesapeake and Ohio Canal National Historical Park.
