= Palo Alto, Virginia =

Unincorporated community in Virginia, United States

- Unincorporated community
- Location within Virginia Location within the United States
- Coordinates: 38°25′24″N 79°22′13″W
- Country: United States
- State: Virginia
- County: Highland
- Elevation: 2,139 ft (652 m)
- Time zone: UTC−5 (Eastern (EST))
  - Summer (DST): UTC−4 (EDT)
- GNIS feature ID: 1497068

Palo Alto is an unincorporated community in Highland County, Virginia, United States. Palo Alto is located 11.4 miles (18.3 km) east-northeast of Monterey on the South Fork South Branch Potomac River. The confluence of Spring Run with the South Fork South Branch Potomac River occurs near the community and Highland County's border with Pendleton County, West Virginia, which is located less than 1/2 mile (0.80 km) north of Palo Alto.
