= Fame, West Virginia =

Unincorporated community in West Virginia, United States

Fame
- Unincorporated community
- Location within the state of West Virginia Fame (the United States)
- Coordinates: 38°44′31″N 79°9′43″W
- Country: United States
- State: West Virginia
- County: Pendleton
- Time zone: UTC-5 (Eastern (EST))
  - Summer (DST): UTC-4 (EDT)
- GNIS feature ID: 1554441

Fame is an unincorporated community on the South Fork South Branch Potomac River in Pendleton County, West Virginia, United States.
