= Forge Hill, West Virginia =

Unincorporated community in West Virginia, United States

Forge Hill
- Unincorporated community
- Location within the state of West Virginia Forge Hill (the United States)
- Coordinates: 39°27′1″N 78°57′17″W
- Country: United States
- State: West Virginia
- County: Mineral
- Time zone: UTC-5 (Eastern (EST))
  - Summer (DST): UTC-4 (EDT)
- GNIS feature ID: 1539129

Forge Hill is an unincorporated community in Mineral County, West Virginia, United States. It is part of the Cumberland, MD-WV Metropolitan Statistical Area. Forge Hill lies to the northeast of the City of Keyser on a hill of the same name, overlooking the North Branch Potomac River.
