= Moatstown, West Virginia =

Moatstown
- Unincorporated community
- Location within the state of West Virginia Moatstown (the United States)
- Coordinates: 38°32′17″N 79°23′41″W
- Country: United States
- State: West Virginia
- County: Pendleton
- Time zone: UTC-5 (Eastern (EST))
  - Summer (DST): UTC-4 (EDT)
- GNIS feature ID: 1549828

Moatstown is an incorporated community located in Pendleton County, West Virginia, United States.

It is the home to one of the founding families, Moats [formerly Motz], in West Virginia.
