= Barnum, West Virginia =

Unincorporated community in West Virginia, United States

Barnum
- Unincorporated community
- Location within the state of West Virginia Barnum (the United States)
- Coordinates: 39°26′30″N 79°06′52″W
- Country: United States
- State: West Virginia
- County: Mineral
- Elevation: 1,181 ft (360 m)
- Time zone: UTC-5 (Eastern (EST))
  - Summer (DST): UTC-4 (EDT)
- GNIS feature ID: 1553804

Barnum is an unincorporated community and coal town in Mineral County, West Virginia, United States. It is part of the Cumberland, MD-WV Metropolitan Statistical Area. Barnum lies on the North Branch Potomac River along a line of the Western Maryland Railroad no longer in operation.

Barnum is located downstream from Jennings Randolph lake which is situated between West Virginia and Maryland on the North Branch of the Potomac River.

The community has the name of William H. Barnum, a railroad official.

== Notable person ==
- Charles Irving Elliott, pioneer aviator
