= Blues Beach, West Virginia =

Unincorporated community in West Virginia, United States

- Unincorporated community
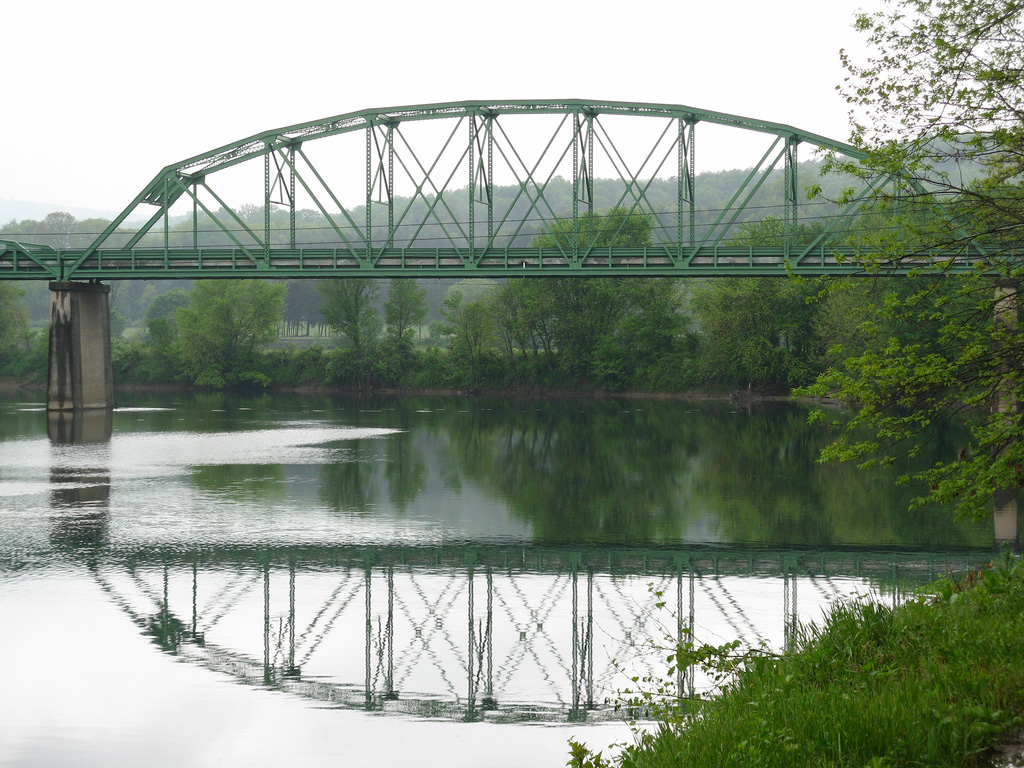
- John Blue Bridge

- Location within Eastern Panhandle of West Virginia Location within West Virginia Location within the United States
- Coordinates: 39°25′33″N 78°42′55″W
- Country: United States
- State: West Virginia
- County: Hampshire
- Time zone: UTC-5 (Eastern (EST))
  - Summer (DST): UTC-4 (EDT)
- GNIS feature ID: 1553940

Blues Beach is an unincorporated community in Hampshire County in the U.S. state of West Virginia. Blues Beach is a predominantly river camp community located south of Springfield and north of Wappocomo on West Virginia Route 28 along the South Branch Potomac River. Blues Beach is also the location of the John Blue Bridge, commonly referred to as "Blue Beach Bridge." Long Road (West Virginia Secondary Route 28/4) intersects with WV 28 here.
