= Ridgedale, Hampshire County, West Virginia =

- Unincorporated community
- Location within West Virginia Location within the United States
- Coordinates: 39°24′41″N 78°44′5″W
- Country: United States
- State: West Virginia
- County: Hampshire
- Time zone: UTC-5 (Eastern (EST))
  - Summer (DST): UTC-4 (EDT)
- GNIS feature ID: 1555478

Ridgedale is an unincorporated community in Hampshire County in the U.S. state of West Virginia. It is located within a horseshoe bend in the South Branch Potomac River between the communities of Blues Beach and Wappocomo. Ridgedale is named for the recently restored 1835 plantation built by George W. Washington (a distant relative of George Washington), also known as Washington Bottom Farm. Washington's plantation obtained its name due to its location at the foot of Mill Creek Ridge at its northernmost extent. Ridgedale is located off the South Branch Valley Railroad and is accessible from West Virginia Route 28 by way of Washington Road (West Virginia Secondary Route 28/3). Ridgedale once had a post office and a school in operation there. Today, Ridgedale consists of the old Washington farm and a number of summer camps, cabins, and vacation homes on the South Branch.
