= McNeill, West Virginia =

- Unincorporated community
- Location within West Virginia Location within the United States
- Coordinates: 39°8′24″N 78°54′48″W
- Country: United States
- State: West Virginia
- County: Hardy
- Elevation: 804 ft (245 m)
- Time zone: UTC-5 (Eastern (EST))
  - Summer (DST): UTC-4 (EDT)
- GNIS feature ID: 1549815

McNeill is an unincorporated community in Hardy County, West Virginia, United States. It lies near the South Branch Potomac River on Trough Road (County Route 6).

The community was named after the McNeill family, the original owners of the town site.
