= Peru, West Virginia =

- Unincorporated community
- Location within West Virginia Location within the United States
- Coordinates: 38°50′27″N 79°4′27″W
- Country: United States
- State: West Virginia
- County: Hardy
- Time zone: UTC-5 (Eastern (EST))
  - Summer (DST): UTC-4 (EDT)
- GNIS feature ID: 1552459

Peru is an unincorporated community on the South Fork South Branch Potomac River in Hardy County, West Virginia, United States.
