= Lineburg, West Virginia =

Lineburg
- Unincorporated community
- Location within the state of West Virginia Lineburg (the United States)
- Coordinates: 39°38′17″N 78°20′48″W
- Country: United States
- State: West Virginia
- County: Morgan
- Time zone: UTC-5 (Eastern (EST))
  - Summer (DST): UTC-4 (EDT)
- GNIS feature ID: 1554958

Lineburg is an unincorporated community in Morgan County in the Eastern Panhandle of the U.S. state of West Virginia. Lineburg lies on the western flanks of Sideling Hill on the Turkey Foot Bend of the Potomac River. The community originally served as a station on the Baltimore and Ohio Railroad, but has since become a location for vacationing weekenders from the Washington, D.C. area.
