= Woodmont, West Virginia =

Woodmont
- Unincorporated community
- Location within the state of West Virginia Woodmont (the United States)
- Coordinates: 39°37′42″N 78°18′39″W
- Country: United States
- State: West Virginia
- County: Morgan
- Time zone: UTC-5 (Eastern (EST))
  - Summer (DST): UTC-4 (EDT)
- GNIS feature ID: 1556022

Woodmont is an unincorporated community on the Potomac River in Morgan County in the U.S. state of West Virginia's Eastern Panhandle. Woodmont lies to the immediate west of the hamlet of Great Cacapon.
