= Dobbin, West Virginia =

Unincorporated community in West Virginia, United States

- Unincorporated community
- Location within West Virginia Location within the United States
- Coordinates: 39°14′19″N 79°24′51″W
- Country: United States
- State: West Virginia
- County: Grant
- Time zone: UTC-5 (Eastern (EST))
  - Summer (DST): UTC-4 (EDT)
- GNIS feature ID: 1554311

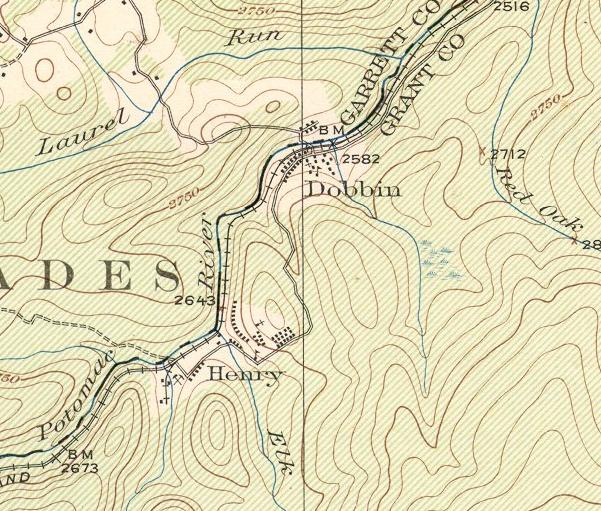
The towns of Dobbin and Henry on a 1921 USGS topographical map.

Dobbin is an unincorporated community on the North Branch Potomac River in Grant County, West Virginia, United States. Dobbin is located southwest of Bayard on West Virginia Route 90.
