= Sir Johns Run, West Virginia =

Sir Johns Run
- Unincorporated community
- Location within the state of West Virginia Sir Johns Run (the United States)
- Coordinates: 39°38′53″N 78°14′5″W
- Country: United States
- State: West Virginia
- County: Morgan
- Time zone: UTC-5 (Eastern (EST))
  - Summer (DST): UTC-4 (EDT)
- GNIS feature ID: 1555632

Sir Johns Run is an unincorporated community hamlet at the mouth of Sir Johns Run on the Potomac River in Morgan County, West Virginia northwest of Berkeley Springs. It is bound to its west by the Widmeyer Wildlife Management Area and to its east by Warm Springs Ridge (1,086 feet). While Sir Johns Run formerly served on the old Baltimore and Ohio Railroad mainline as an early passenger station for Berkeley Springs, today it is primarily a residential community of Berkeley Springs accessible by Sir Johns Run Road (County Route 3). Sir Johns Run had its own post office in operation from 1850 to 1938. Today, the stream and its namesake hamlet are a site on the Washington Heritage Trail.
