= Ruddle, West Virginia =

Ruddle
- Unincorporated community
- Location within the state of West Virginia Ruddle (the United States)
- Coordinates: 38°42′45″N 79°18′30″W
- Country: United States
- State: West Virginia
- County: Pendleton
- Time zone: UTC-5 (Eastern (EST))
  - Summer (DST): UTC-4 (EDT)
- GNIS feature ID: 1552754

Ruddle is an unincorporated community on the South Branch Potomac River located in Pendleton County, West Virginia, United States. Ruddle lies along U.S. Highway 220. According to the Geographic Names Information System, Ruddle was originally known by the names of Ruddle Mill and Ruddle's Mill.

The community was named after Edward Ruddle, the proprietor of a local mill.
