= Cunningham, West Virginia =

Unincorporated community in West Virginia, United States

- Unincorporated community
- Location within West Virginia Location within the United States
- Coordinates: 39°5′46″N 78°56′38″W
- Country: United States
- State: West Virginia
- County: Hardy
- Time zone: UTC-5 (Eastern (EST))
  - Summer (DST): UTC-4 (EDT)
- GNIS feature ID: 1554243

Cunningham is an unincorporated community in Hardy County, West Virginia, United States. It lies north of Moorefield along the South Branch Valley Railroad and Trough Road (County Route 6) on the eastern side of the South Branch Potomac River.
