= Orleans Cross Roads, West Virginia =

Orleans Cross Roads
- Unincorporated community
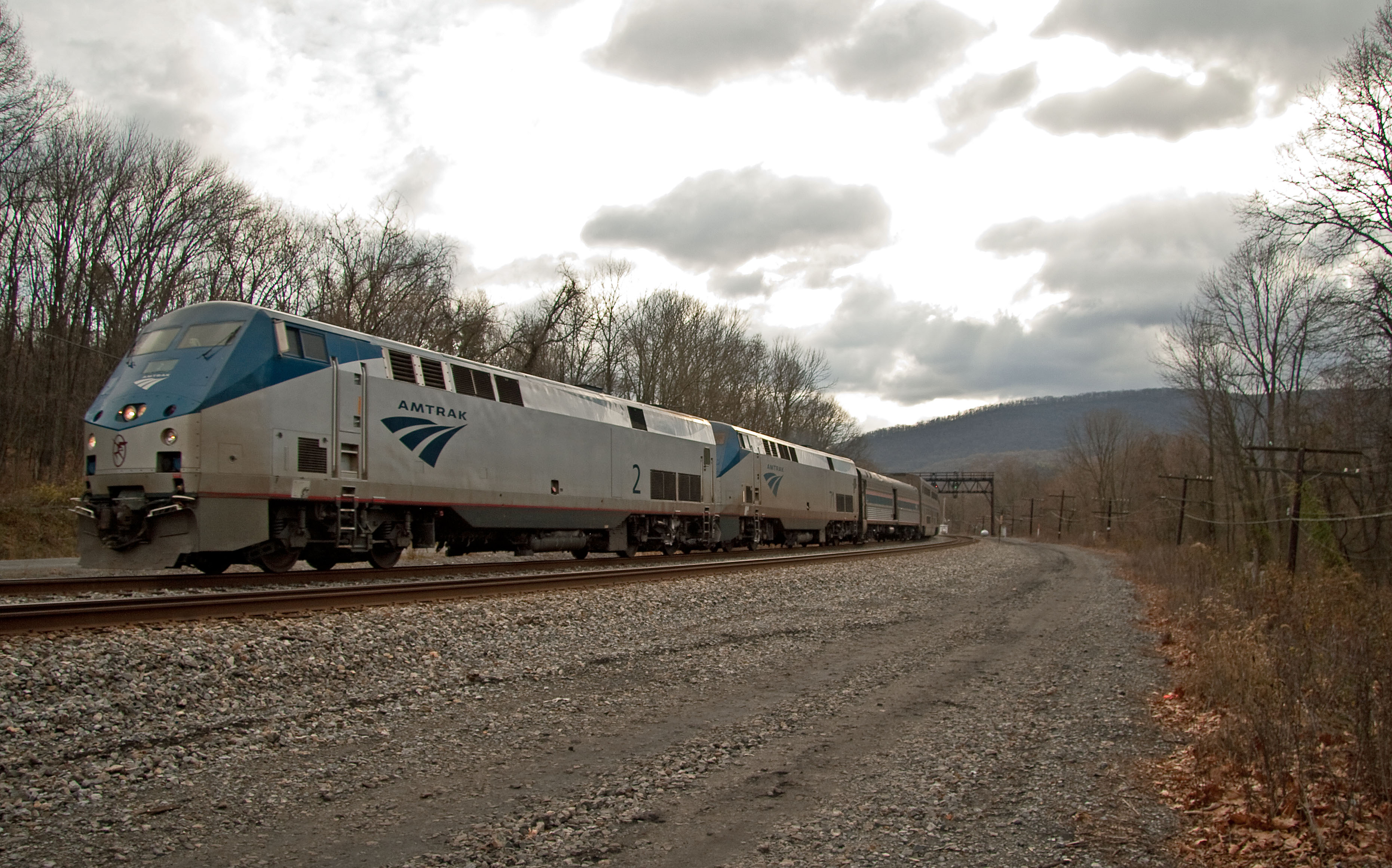
- Amtrak's Capitol Limited speeds through Orleans Cross Roads in 2010.

- Location within the state of West Virginia Orleans Cross Roads (the United States)
- Coordinates: 39°37′28″N 78°22′45″W
- Country: United States
- State: West Virginia
- County: Morgan
- Time zone: UTC-5 (Eastern (EST))
  - Summer (DST): UTC-4 (EDT)
- GNIS feature ID: 1555273

Orleans Cross Roads is an unincorporated community hamlet that lies on the western flanks of Sideling Hill on the Potomac River in Morgan County, West Virginia. To its south, Rockwell Run, a mountain stream fed by springs, empties into the Potomac. Orleans Cross Roads lies along the old Baltimore and Ohio Railroad directly across the river from Little Orleans. It is accessible by way of Orleans Road (CR 18/1) from Cacapon Road (West Virginia Route 9) via Detour Road (CR 18).

Once the site of a functioning station on the B&O, Orleans Cross Roads also had its own operating post office. The community and post office were often known as Orleans Cross Roads or Orleans Crossroads while its station was known as Orleans Road Station. It is still inhabited today and is the site of the historic Orleans Cross Roads Methodist Episcopal Church, built in the 1850s.
