= Propstburg, West Virginia =

Propstburg
- Unincorporated community
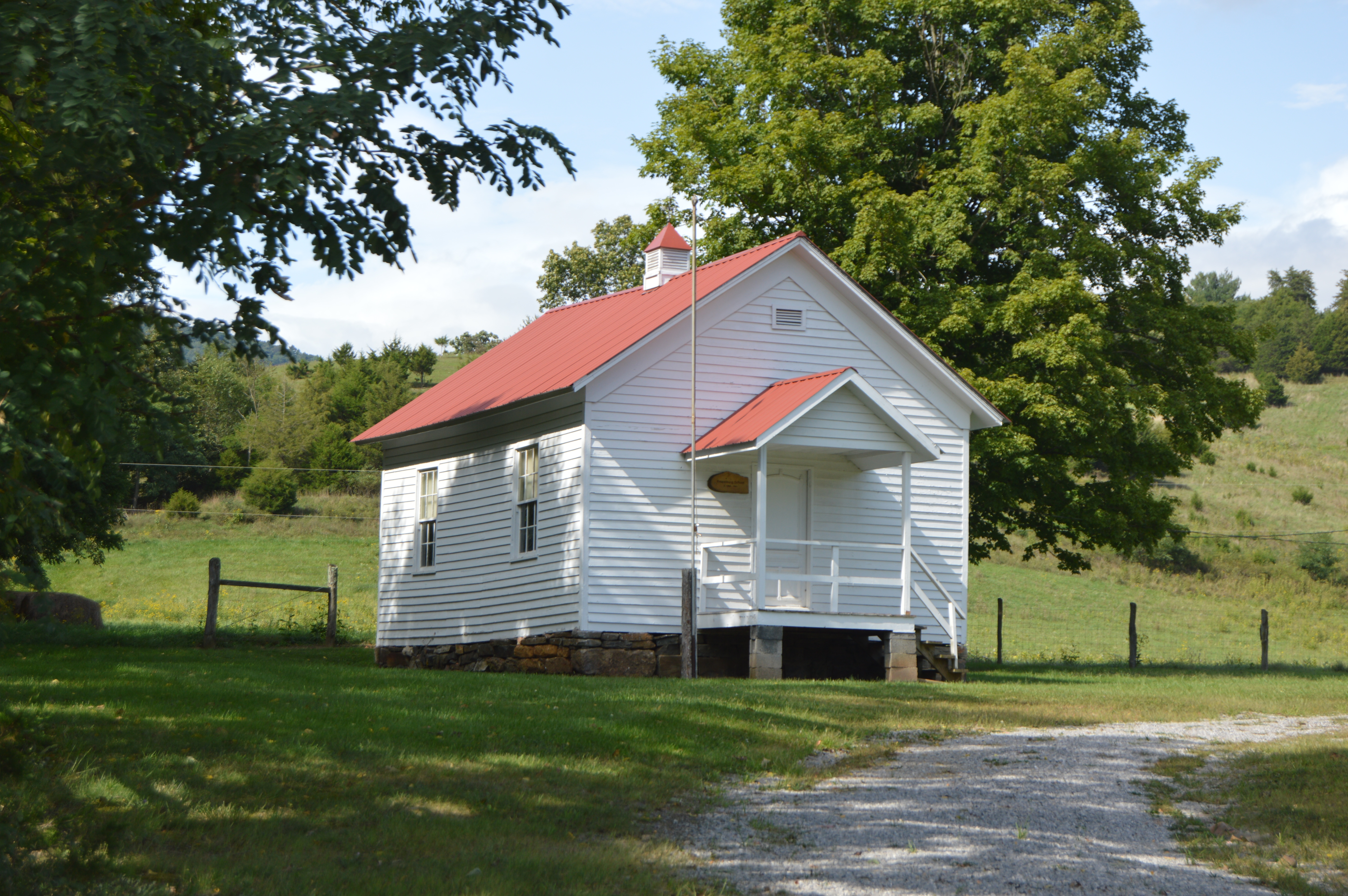
- Former schoolhouse

- Location within the state of West Virginia Propstburg (the United States)
- Coordinates: 38°36′3″N 79°15′33″W
- Country: United States
- State: West Virginia
- County: Pendleton
- Time zone: UTC-5 (Eastern (EST))
  - Summer (DST): UTC-4 (EDT)
- GNIS feature ID: 1555418

Propstburg is an unincorporated community in Pendleton County, West Virginia, United States, on the South Fork South Branch Potomac River.

== Climate ==
The climate in this area has mild differences between highs and lows, and there is adequate rainfall year-round. According to the Köppen Climate Classification system, Propstburg has a marine west coast climate, abbreviated "Cfb" on climate maps.
