= Tannery, West Virginia =

- Unincorporated community
- Location within West Virginia Location within the United States
- Coordinates: 39°3′5″N 78°57′26″W
- Country: United States
- State: West Virginia
- County: Hardy
- Elevation: 892 ft (272 m)
- Time zone: UTC-5 (Eastern (EST))
  - Summer (DST): UTC-4 (EDT)
- GNIS feature ID: 1555780

Tannery is an unincorporated community in Hardy County, West Virginia, United States. Tannery is located south of Moorefield on the South Fork South Branch Potomac River.
