= Carpendale, West Virginia =

- Town
- Location of Carpendale in Mineral County, West Virginia.
- Coordinates: 39°37′25″N 78°47′28″W
- Country: United States
- State: West Virginia
- County: Mineral

Government
  - Type: Mayor-Council

Area
  - Total: 1.31 sq mi (3.40 km^{2})
  - Land: 1.31 sq mi (3.40 km^{2})
  - Water: 0 sq mi (0.00 km^{2})
- Elevation: 735 ft (224 m)

Population (2020)
  - Total: 860
  - Estimate (2021): 852
  - Density: 689.8/sq mi (266.35/km^{2})
- Time zone: UTC-5 (Eastern (EST))
  - Summer (DST): UTC-4 (EDT)
- Postal codes: 26753 (Ridgeley, West Virginia)
- Area code: 304
- FIPS code: 54-13525
- GNIS feature ID: 2390771
- Website: https://www.townofcarpendale.com/

Carpendale is a town in Mineral County, West Virginia, United States, and part of the Cumberland, MD-WV Metropolitan Statistical Area'. The population was 861 at the 2020 census. Carpendale was incorporated on January 2, 1990, by the Circuit Court. The town is a combination of three subdivisions of which its name reflects: Carpenters Addition, Millerdale I, and Millerdale II. There are no stores in Carpendale and there is only one road in and out of the town.

== Transportation ==
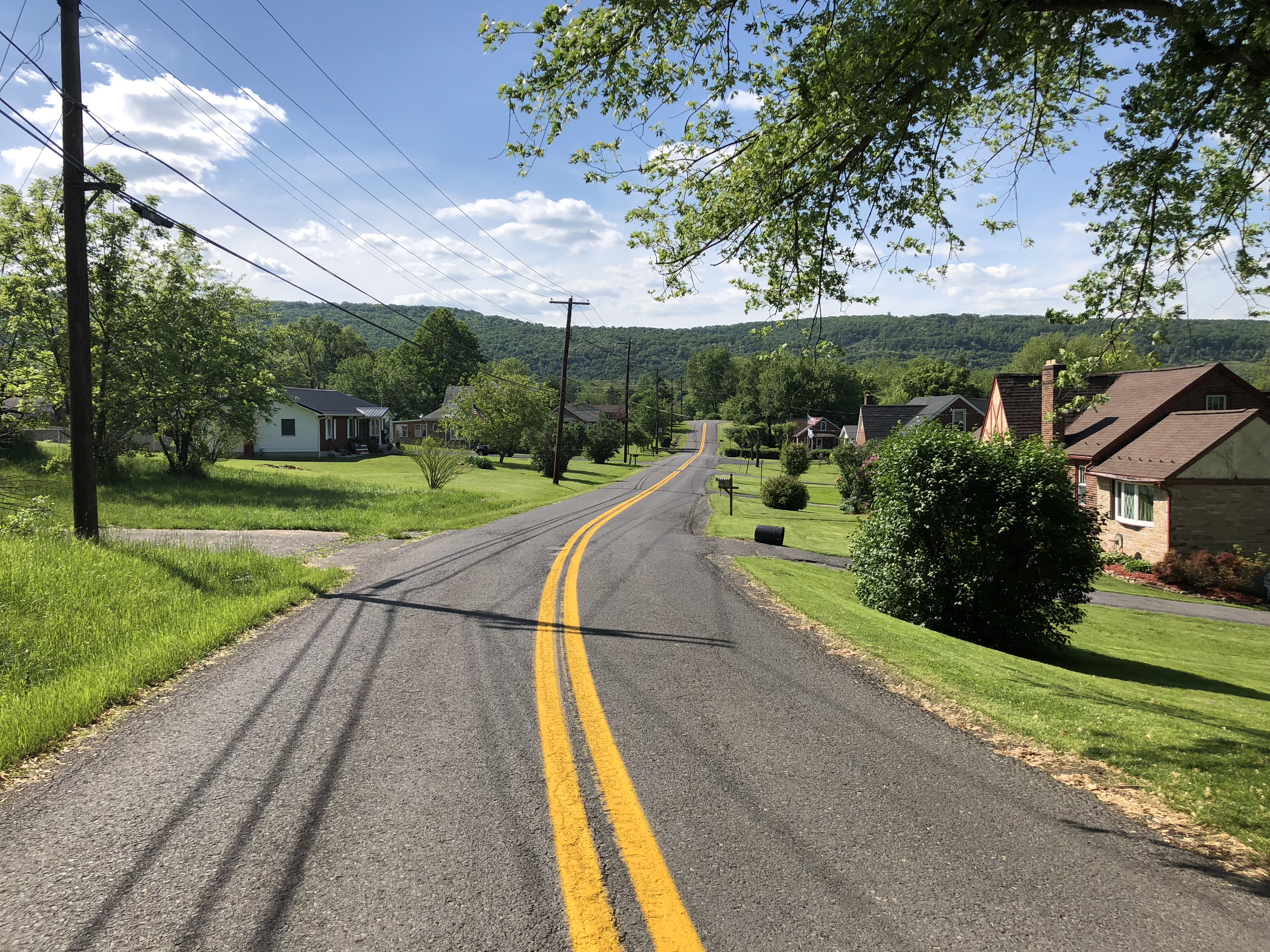
Miller Road (CR 28) in Carpendale

No significant highways serve Carpendale directly. The main road providing access to the town is Miller Road (CR 28). The nearest state highway is West Virginia Route 28 Alternate in nearby Ridgeley. The nearest Interstate and U.S. highways are Interstate 68, U.S. Route 40 and U.S. Route 220, all of which are located across the North Branch Potomac River in Cumberland, Maryland.

== Geography ==
According to the United States Census Bureau, the town has a total area of 1.31 square miles (3.39 km^{2}), all land.

== Demographics ==
Historical population
Census	Pop.	Note	%±
2000	954		—
2010	977		2.4%
2020	860		−12.0%
2021 (est.)	852	▼	−0.9%
U.S. Decennial Census

=== 2010 census ===
As of the census of 2010, there were 977 people, 402 households, and 286 families living in the town. The population density was 745.8 inhabitants per square mile (288.0/km^{2}). There were 421 housing units at an average density of 321.4 per square mile (124.1/km^{2}). The racial makeup of the town was 98.9% White, 0.5% African American, 0.1% Native American, 0.3% Asian, and 0.2% from two or more races.

There were 402 households, of which 24.6% had children under the age of 18 living with them, 59.0% were married couples living together, 8.2% had a female householder with no husband present, 4.0% had a male householder with no wife present, and 28.9% were non-families. 23.6% of all households were made up of individuals, and 12.2% had someone living alone who was 65 years of age or older. The average household size was 2.43 and the average family size was 2.86.

The median age in the town was 43.4 years. 19.2% of residents were under the age of 18; 6.9% were between the ages of 18 and 24; 26.5% were from 25 to 44; 24.7% were from 45 to 64; and 22.5% were 65 years of age or older. The gender makeup of the town was 49.0% male and 51.0% female.

=== 2000 census ===
As of the census of 2000, there were 954 people, 383 households, and 284 families living in the town. The population density was 722.4 inhabitants per square mile (278.9/km^{2}). There were 404 housing units at an average density of 305.9 per square mile (118.1/km^{2}). The racial makeup of the town was 99.27% White, 0.10% African American, and 0.63% from two or more races. Hispanic or Latino of any race were 0.21% of the population.

There were 383 households, out of which 29.0% had children under the age of 18 living with them, 62.1% were married couples living together, 8.6% had a female householder with no husband present, and 25.6% were non-families. 21.9% of all households were made up of individuals, and 10.4% had someone living alone who was 65 years of age or older. The average household size was 2.49 and the average family size was 2.89.

In the town, the population was spread out, with 22.1% under the age of 18, 7.9% from 18 to 24, 24.9% from 25 to 44, 32.0% from 45 to 64, and 13.1% who were 65 years of age or older. The median age was 40 years. For every 100 females, there were 95.5 males. For every 100 females age 18 and over, there were 93.5 males.

The median income for a household in the town was $35,404, and the median income for a family was $37,235. Males had a median income of $31,250 versus $20,795 for females. The per capita income for the town was $15,588. About 3.6% of families and 7.0% of the population were below the poverty line, including 5.6% of those under age 18 and 5.0% of those age 65 or over.
