= Durgon, West Virginia =

Unincorporated community in West Virginia, United States

- Unincorporated community
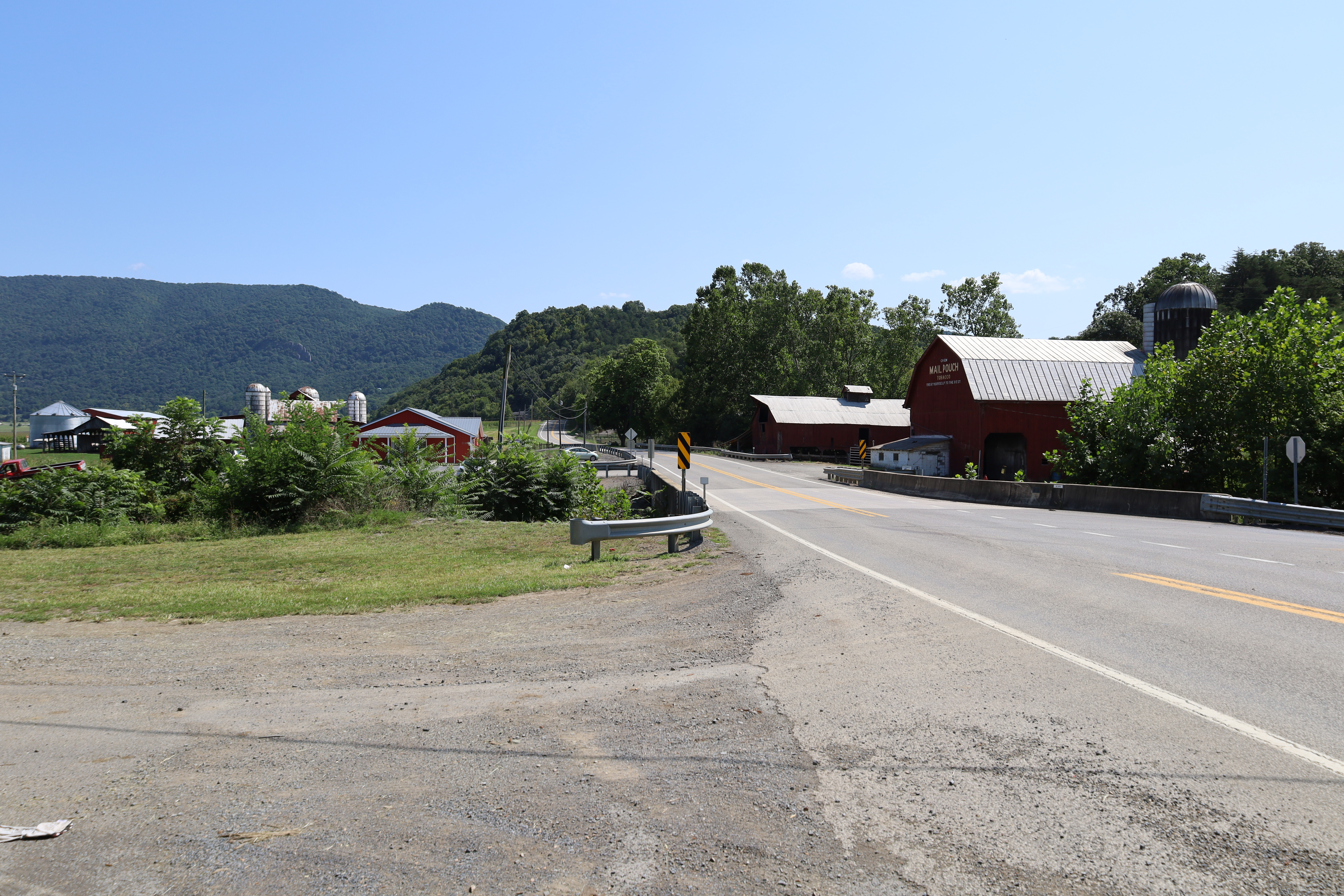

- Location within West Virginia Location within the United States
- Coordinates: 38°59′35″N 79°2′44″W
- Country: United States
- State: West Virginia
- County: Hardy
- Time zone: UTC-5 (Eastern (EST))
  - Summer (DST): UTC-4 (EDT)
- GNIS feature ID: 1554340

Durgon is an unincorporated community in Hardy County, West Virginia, United States. It is located on US 220/WV 28/WV 55 at the routes' junction with County Route 220/5, west of Moorefield along the South Branch Potomac River.
