= Pancake, West Virginia =

- Unincorporated community
- Location within West Virginia Location within the United States
- Coordinates: 39°15′29″N 78°50′2″W
- Country: United States
- State: West Virginia
- County: Hampshire
- Time zone: UTC-5 (Eastern (EST))
  - Summer (DST): UTC-4 (EDT)
- GNIS feature ID: 1555298

Pancake is an unincorporated community in Hampshire County in the U.S. state of West Virginia. Pancake is located on Pancake Road (County Route 8/2), once connecting to South Branch River Road (County Route 8) across the South Branch Potomac River. Pancake was once a stop along the South Branch Valley Railroad and is named for the Pancake family in the immediate area. The Pancake Post Office has been closed.
