= Brake, West Virginia =

Unincorporated community in West Virginia, United States

- Unincorporated community
- Location within West Virginia Location within the United States
- Coordinates: 38°53′22″N 79°2′10″W
- Country: United States
- State: West Virginia
- County: Hardy
- Time zone: UTC-5 (Eastern (EST))
  - Summer (DST): UTC-4 (EDT)
- GNIS feature ID: 1553964

Brake is an unincorporated community on the South Fork South Branch Potomac River in Hardy County, West Virginia, United States. The community is named for the family of early landowner Johann Jacob Brake ("Brechtel" in German), who emigrated from southern Germany in the early 18th century. The town once included a sawmill, gristmill, distillery, blacksmith shop, and post office. The original log house used as a post office in the early- to mid-19th century still stands. The Brake Cemetery harbors the remains of Brakes, Simons, Sees, and probably others whose stones have been lost. Brake Falls on Dumpling Run once provided power for the sawmill and gristmill. The Brake family currently resides in Ohio.

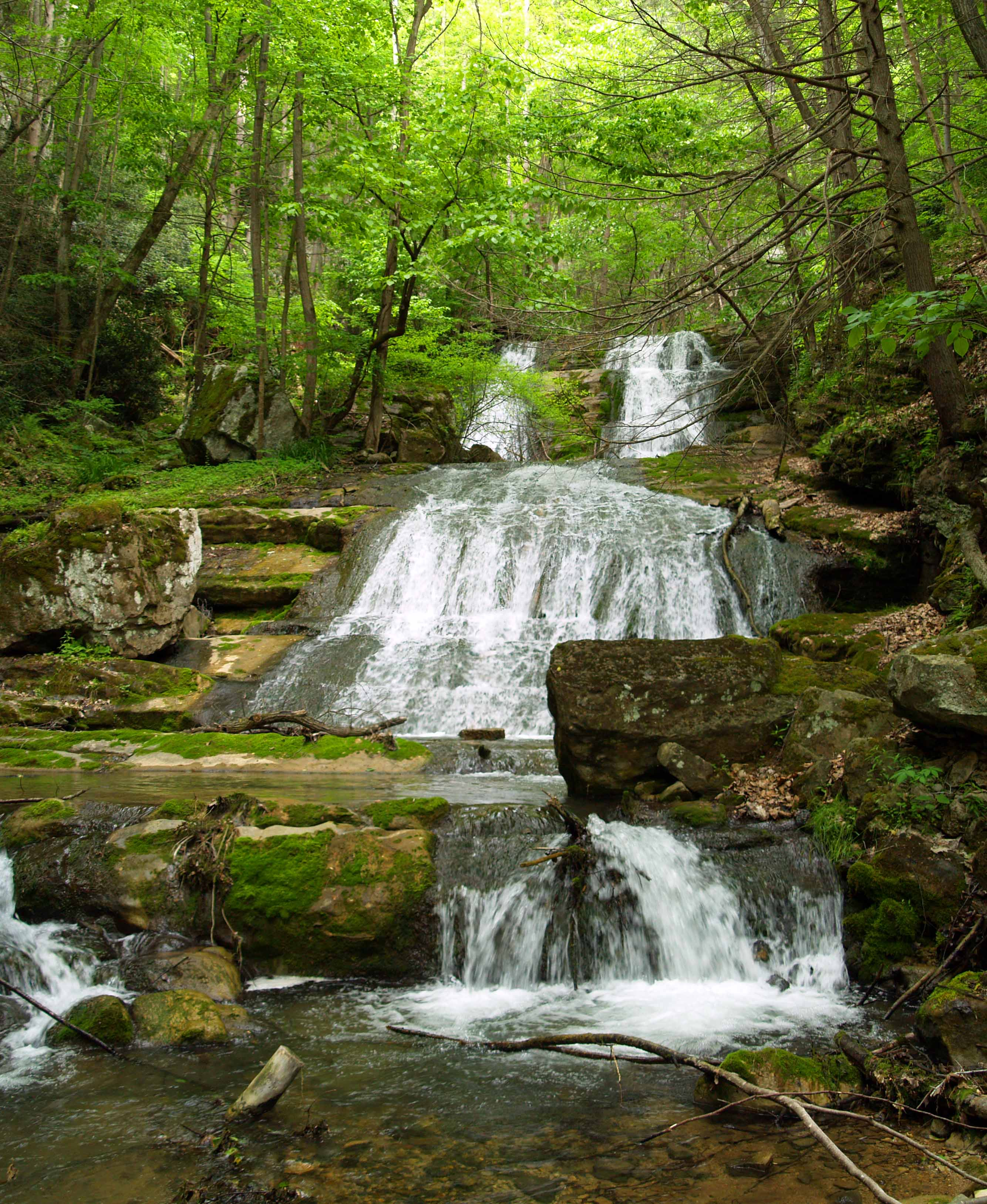
