= Rawlings, Maryland =

- Census-designated place
- Mayor: James Zapf
- Location within the State of Maryland Rawlings, Maryland (the United States)
- Coordinates: 39°32′20″N 78°52′40″W
- Country: United States
- State: Maryland
- County: Allegany

Area
  - Total: 0.90 sq mi (2.32 km^{2})
  - Land: 0.89 sq mi (2.31 km^{2})
  - Water: 0.0039 sq mi (0.01 km^{2})
- Elevation: 866 ft (264 m)

Population (2020)
  - Total: 687
  - Density: 770/sq mi (297/km^{2})
- Time zone: UTC−5 (Eastern (EST))
  - Summer (DST): UTC−4 (EDT)
- ZIP code: 21557
- FIPS code: 24-65150
- GNIS feature ID: 2583680

Rawlings is an unincorporated community and census-designated place (CDP) in Allegany County, Maryland, United States, on the McMullen Highway (U.S. Route 220). As of the 2010 census, the Rawlings CDP had a population of 693.

The community was named after Moses Rawlings, an officer in the Revolutionary War. It was originally known as "Rawlings Station" after a post office was established on the railroad there on March 7, 1856.

== Demographics ==
Historical population
Census	Pop.	Note	%±
2020	687		—
U.S. Decennial Census
