= Sugar Grove, West Virginia =

Human settlement in the United States

Sugar Grove is a community located in Pendleton County, West Virginia, United States. Its ZIP Code is 26815. It is located within the United States National Radio Quiet Zone.

The community was named for a sugar orchard at the original town site. The Bowers House was listed on the National Register of Historic Places in 1985.

The nearby Sugar Grove Station is operated by the National Security Agency.

In 2017, the Navy Operations Information Command base in Sugar Grove was auctioned off by the GSA. It was purchased by an Alabama-based investment group with plans to convert the base into a healthcare facility for active-duty military, veterans, and their families.
