= Cabins, West Virginia =

Unincorporated community in West Virginia, United States

- Unincorporated community
- Location within West Virginia Location within the United States
- Coordinates: 38°59′56″N 79°12′19″W
- Country: United States
- State: West Virginia
- County: Grant

Government
- Time zone: UTC-5 (Eastern (EST))
  - Summer (DST): UTC-4 (EDT)
- ZIP codes: 26855
- GNIS feature ID

Cabins is an unincorporated community on the North Fork South Branch Potomac River in Grant County, West Virginia, United States. Cabins lies within the Spruce Knob–Seneca Rocks National Recreation Area of the Monongahela National Forest.

According to the Geographic Names Information System, Cabins has also been known throughout its history as Cabin, Corner, Corners, and Hyre's Rock. The Board on Geographic Names officially decided upon Cabins as the community's name in 1965. The origin of the name "Cabins" is obscure.
