= Cave, West Virginia =

Unincorporated community in West Virginia, United States

Cave
- Unincorporated community
- Location within the state of West Virginia Cave (the United States)
- Coordinates: 38°32′50″N 79°26′43″W
- Country: United States
- State: West Virginia
- County: Pendleton
- Time zone: UTC-5 (Eastern (EST))
  - Summer (DST): UTC-4 (EDT)
- GNIS feature ID: 1537108

Cave is an unincorporated community in Pendleton County, West Virginia, United States. It was so named because of a nearby cave. A post office was established here in 1890. Cave is located on U.S. Route 220 along the South Branch Potomac River.
