= Milam, Hardy County, West Virginia =

- Unincorporated community
- Location within West Virginia Location within the United States
- Coordinates: 38°48′50″N 79°5′57″W
- Country: United States
- State: West Virginia
- County: Hardy
- Elevation: 1,211 ft (369 m)
- Time zone: UTC-5 (Eastern (EST))
  - Summer (DST): UTC-4 (EDT)
- GNIS feature ID: 1552093

Milam is an unincorporated community on the South Fork South Branch Potomac River in southern Hardy County, West Virginia, United States. Milam is located along County Route 7. Originally known as Wine Spring, the community's name was changed to Milam in 1898.

The community most likely was named after the local Milam family.
