= Henry, West Virginia =

- Unincorporated community
- Location within West Virginia Location within the United States
- Coordinates: 39°13′23″N 79°25′16″W
- Country: United States
- State: West Virginia
- County: Grant
- Time zone: UTC-5 (Eastern (EST))
  - Summer (DST): UTC-4 (EDT)
- GNIS feature ID: 1551412

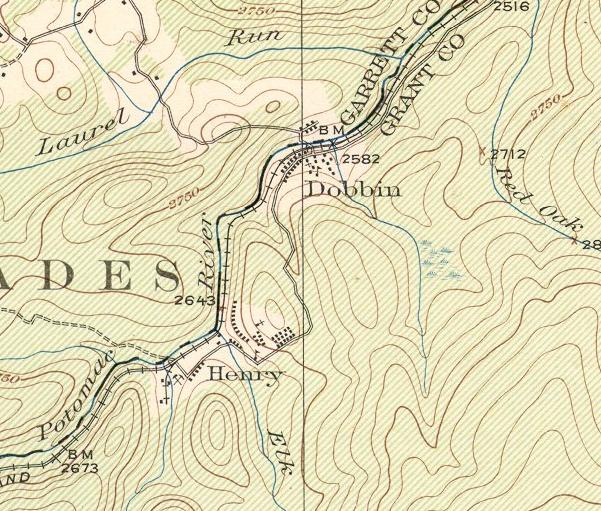
The towns of Henry and Dobbin on a 1921 USGS topographical map.

Henry is an unincorporated community on West Virginia Route 90 in northwestern Grant County, West Virginia, United States. Henry lies on Elk Creek shortly before its confluence with the North Branch Potomac River.

The community was named after Henry G. Davis, a businessman in the mining industry.
