= Wappocomo, West Virginia =

- Unincorporated community
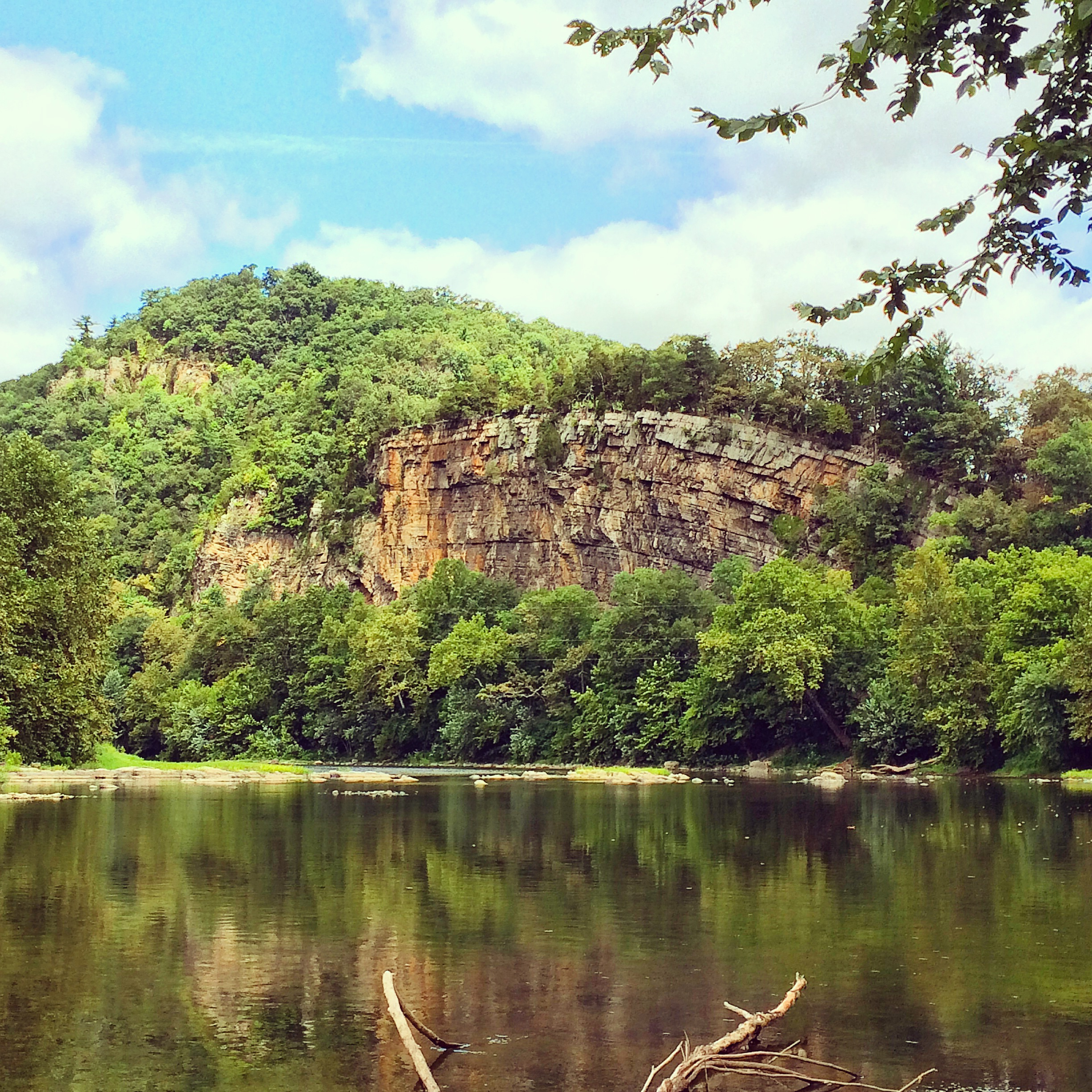
- Hanging Rocks viewed from the South Branch Potomac River

- Location within West Virginia Location within the United States
- Coordinates: 39°23′42″N 78°44′5″W
- Country: United States
- State: West Virginia
- County: Hampshire
- Time zone: UTC-5 (Eastern (EST))
  - Summer (DST): UTC-4 (EDT)
- GNIS feature ID: 1549977

Wappocomo is an unincorporated community in Hampshire County in the U.S. state of West Virginia. The community is located south of Springfield on West Virginia Route 28 at Hanging Rocks along the South Branch Potomac River. Wappocomo has also historically been referred to as The Rocks, Wapocoma, and Wapocomo.

The community's name comes from the Native Americans of the area, Wappocomo meaning South Branch Potomac River in the local Indian language.

Wappocomo has become a popular summer campsite location on the South Branch for both locals and out-of-state visitors. It should not be confused with the Wapocoma Campgrounds, located five miles south of Romney on South Branch River Road (West Virginia Secondary Route 8).

== Historic site ==
- The Rocks, a 19th-century white clapboard farmhouse
