= Glebe, West Virginia =

Unincorporated community in West Virginia, United States

- Unincorporated community
- Location within West Virginia Location within the United States
- Coordinates: 39°12′0″N 78°51′33″W
- Country: United States
- State: West Virginia
- County: Hampshire
- Time zone: UTC-5 (Eastern (EST))
  - Summer (DST): UTC-4 (EDT)
- GNIS feature ID: 1556766

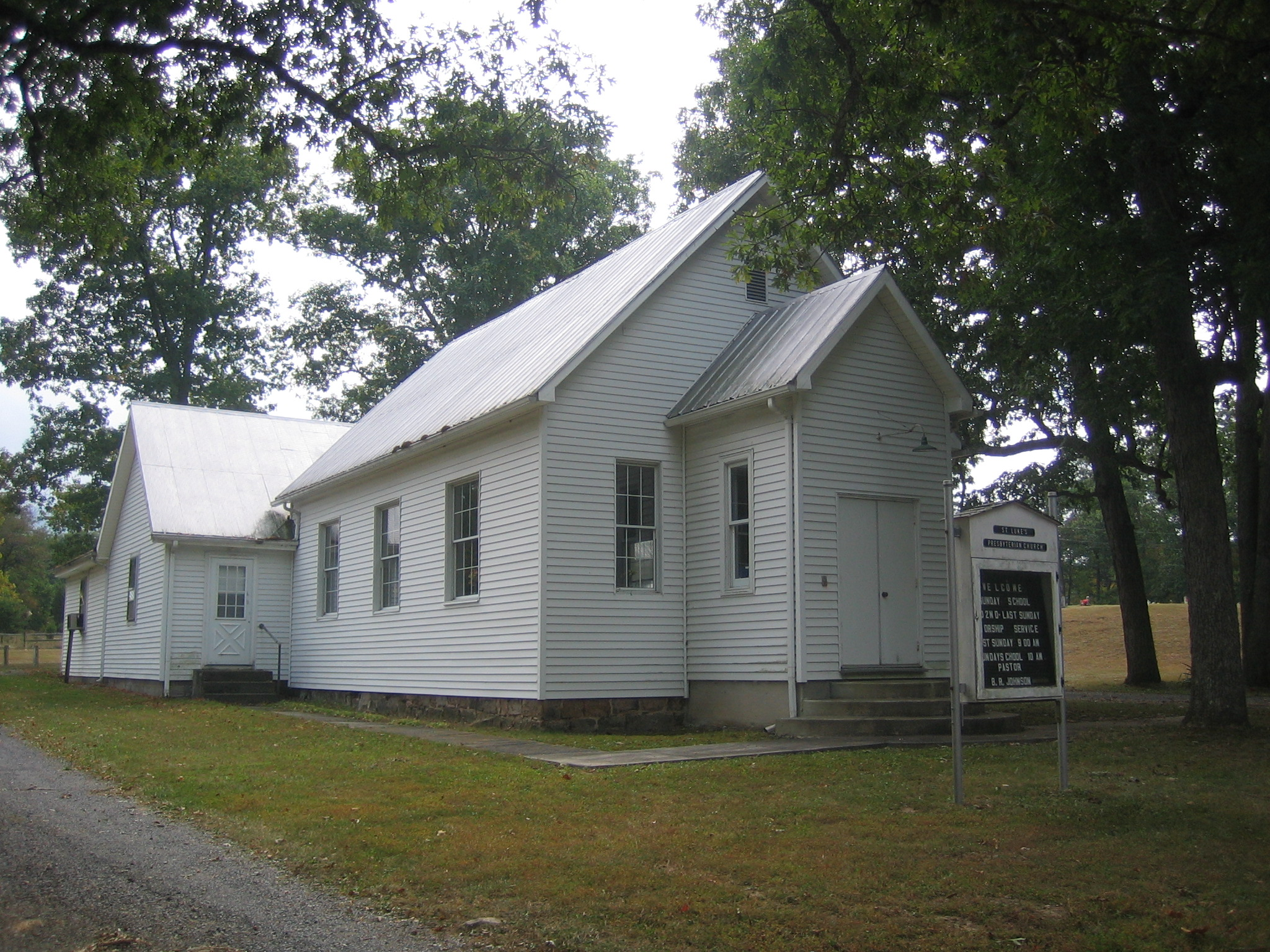
St. Luke's Presbyterian Church

Glebe was an unincorporated community in Hampshire County, West Virginia, United States. It is situated at the lower mouth of the Trough, a gorge of the South Branch Potomac River, and is about 9.5 miles (15.3 km) southwest of Romney on South Branch River Road (West Virginia Secondary Route 8). The community received its name from the old stone glebehouse (parsonage) that was constructed there in the late 18th century. The stone house later became the Hampshire County Poor Farm and remains standing. The community of Sector lies directly across the river.

While Glebe no longer has a post office, and only a few residents remain there, it is still a popular spot for canoers and fishermen because of its proximity to the Trough's mouth. For vacationers, sportsmen, and locals alike, Glebe's Trough General Store supplies canoe rentals, fishing supplies, bait, drinks, snacks, and ice.

== Historic sites ==
- Fort Van Meter, approximately one mile from Glebe
- Old Stone Glebehouse (County Poor Farm), South Branch River Road (CR 8)
- Saint Luke's Presbyterian Chapel, South Branch River Road (CR 8)
