= Rocket Center, West Virginia =

Rocket Center
- Unincorporated community
- Location within the state of West Virginia Rocket Center (the United States)
- Coordinates: 39°33′40″N 78°49′56″W
- Country: United States
- State: West Virginia
- County: Mineral
- Time zone: UTC-5 (Eastern (EST))
  - Summer (DST): UTC-4 (EDT)
- GNIS feature ID: 1717905

Rocket Center, West Virginia is the site of a government installation known as Allegany Ballistics Laboratory, part of the Naval Sea Systems Command which is currently operated by Northrop Grumman. Rocket Center shares a ZIP Code with Keyser but is located 15 miles (24 km) north along the North Branch Potomac River in Mineral County, West Virginia. There are no residents in Rocket Center.

Also on the site is the Robert C. Byrd Hilltop Office Complex and the Robert C. Byrd Institute for Advanced Flexible Manufacturing, both named for the second-longest-serving member of Congress, the late United States Senator Robert C. Byrd.
