= Macksville, West Virginia =

Macksville
- Unincorporated community
- Location within the state of West Virginia Macksville (the United States)
- Coordinates: 38°48′2″N 79°23′58″W
- Country: United States
- State: West Virginia
- County: Pendleton
- Time zone: UTC-5 (Eastern (EST))
  - Summer (DST): UTC-4 (EDT)
- GNIS feature ID: 1555022

Macksville is an unincorporated community in Pendleton County, West Virginia, United States. Macksville is located along U.S. Route 33/West Virginia Route 28 on the North Fork South Branch Potomac River.

The community derives its name from Peter McDonald, an early postmaster.
