= Fort Seybert, West Virginia =

Unincorporated community in West Virginia, United States

Fort Seybert
- Unincorporated community
- Location within the state of West Virginia Fort Seybert (the United States)
- Coordinates: 38°41′38″N 79°11′32″W
- Country: United States
- State: West Virginia
- County: Pendleton
- Time zone: UTC-5 (Eastern (EST))
  - Summer (DST): UTC-4 (EDT)

Fort Seybert is an unincorporated community located in Pendleton County, West Virginia, United States. This town was named for Captain Jacob Seybert, who built an early stockade here. It was captured by Native Americans in 1758, who spared only eleven lives (see Bemino). Fort Seybert is the only place in the United States with this name.

Fort Seybert is located along the South Fork South Branch Potomac River.
