= Beryl, West Virginia =

Unincorporated community in West Virginia, United States

Beryl
- Unincorporated community
- Location within the state of West Virginia Beryl (the United States)
- Coordinates: 39°28′20″N 79°03′49″W
- Country: United States
- State: West Virginia
- County: Mineral
- Elevation: 1,001 ft (305 m)
- Time zone: UTC-5 (Eastern (EST))
  - Summer (DST): UTC-4 (EDT)
- GNIS feature ID: 1553873

Beryl was an unincorporated community and coal town located in Mineral County, West Virginia, United States. Homes and properties were slowly purchased over the years by Westvaco paper company. By the late 1900s, all the residents were gone, and the last standing home became an office for the Westvaco woodyard. Currently, only New Page Paper (formerly Westvaco) and Kingsford Charcoal occupy the location of the town. West Virginia Route 46 allows for the only mode of transportation to Beryl.

Beryl Abernathy, the onetime postmaster, gave the community her name.
