= Oak Flat, West Virginia =

Oak Flat
- Unincorporated community
- Location within the state of West Virginia Oak Flat (the United States)
- Coordinates: 38°39′34″N 79°12′46″W
- Country: United States
- State: West Virginia
- County: Pendleton
- Time zone: UTC-5 (Eastern (EST))
  - Summer (DST): UTC-4 (EDT)
- GNIS feature ID: 1552354

Oak Flat is an unincorporated community on the South Fork South Branch Potomac River located in Pendleton County, West Virginia, United States. Oak Flat lies along U.S. Highway 33.
