= Dans Run, West Virginia =

Unincorporated community in West Virginia, United States

Dans Run
- Unincorporated community
- Location within the state of West Virginia Dans Run (the United States)
- Coordinates: 39°32′46″N 78°41′29″W
- Country: United States
- State: West Virginia
- County: Mineral
- Elevation: 568 ft (173 m)
- Time zone: UTC-5 (Eastern (EST))
  - Summer (DST): UTC-4 (EDT)
- GNIS feature ID: 1554254

Dans Run is an unincorporated community in Mineral County, West Virginia, United States. It is part of the Cumberland, MD-WV Metropolitan Statistical Area. Dans Run is located along the former Baltimore and Ohio Railroad (now CSX) at the confluence of Dans Run and the North Branch Potomac River.
