= Springfield, West Virginia =

- Census-designated place (CDP)
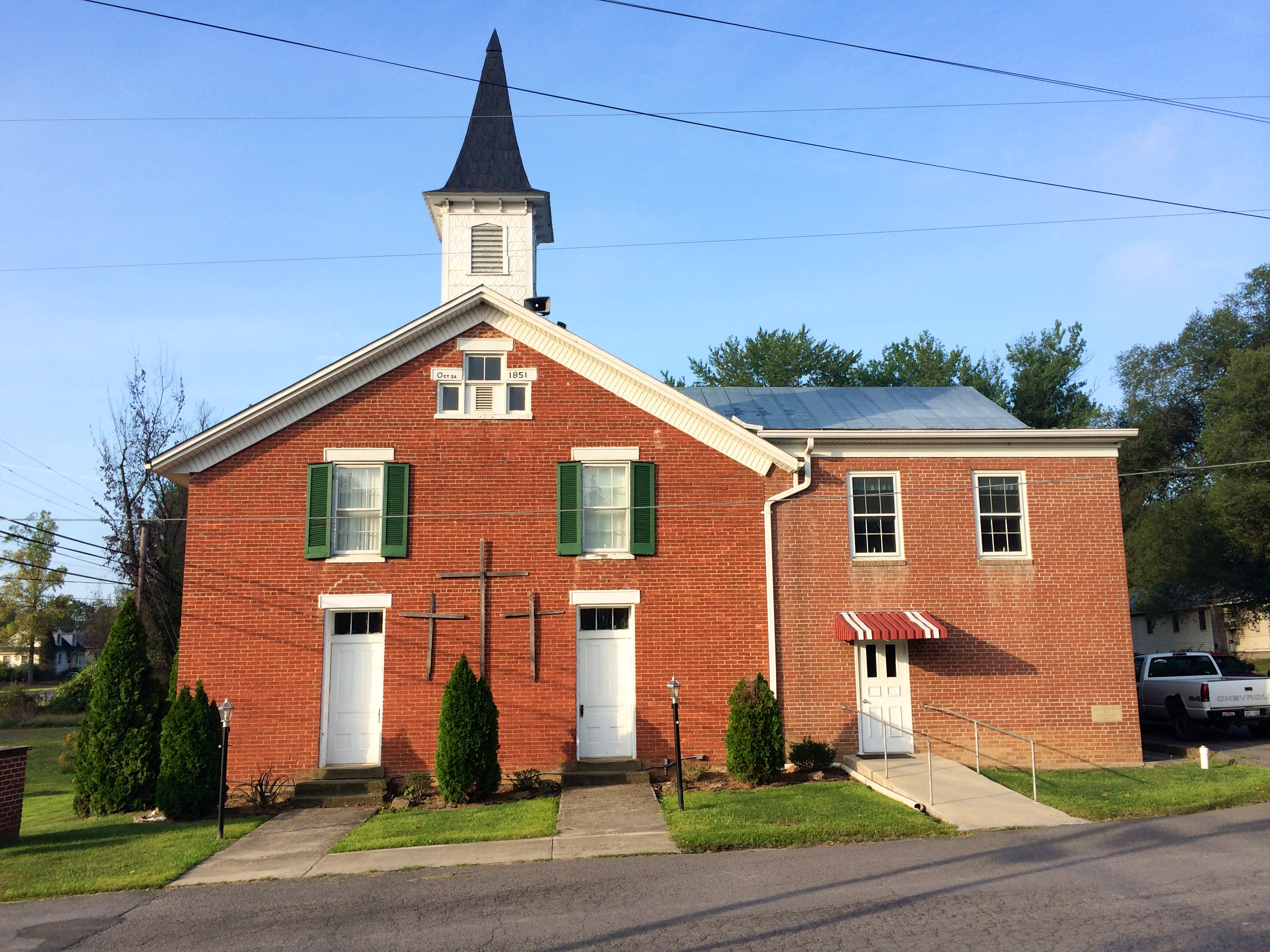
- Springfield United Methodist Church

- Location of Springfield in West Virginia
- Coordinates: 39°26′42″N 78°41′52″W
- Country: United States
- State: West Virginia
- County: Hampshire

Area
  - Total: 1.341 sq mi (3.47 km^{2})
  - Land: 1.340 sq mi (3.47 km^{2})
  - Water: 0.001 sq mi (0.0026 km^{2})
- Elevation: 764 ft (233 m)

Population (2020)
  - Total: 455
  - Density: 340/sq mi (131/km^{2})
- Time zone: UTC-5 (Eastern (EST))
  - Summer (DST): UTC-4 (EDT)
- ZIP code: 26763
- Area code: 304
- GNIS feature ID: 2586885

Springfield is a census-designated place (CDP) in northwestern Hampshire County, West Virginia, United States. As of the 2020 census, Springfield had a population of 455 (down from 477 at the 2010 census). Springfield is located north of Romney along West Virginia Route 28 at its junction with Green Spring Road (West Virginia Secondary Route 1) and Springfield Pike (West Virginia Secondary Route 3).

== History ==
Established on December 16, 1790, at the "Cross Roads" of Hampshire County on the property of William and Samuel Abernethy by an act of the Virginia General Assembly, Springfield was named in commemoration of the Battle of Springfield (1780).

George Washington first visited the Springfield area in 1748 as a member of a party that surveyed the land holdings of Thomas Fairfax, 6th Lord Fairfax of Cameron in the South Branch Potomac River Valley.

In June 1861, the town organized a company of men known as the "Potomac Guards" in support of the Confederacy. The company was under the command of Captain Philip T. Grace.

On August 23, 1861, Springfield played host to an American Civil War skirmish between the Unionists and the Confederates.

=== Historic Sites ===
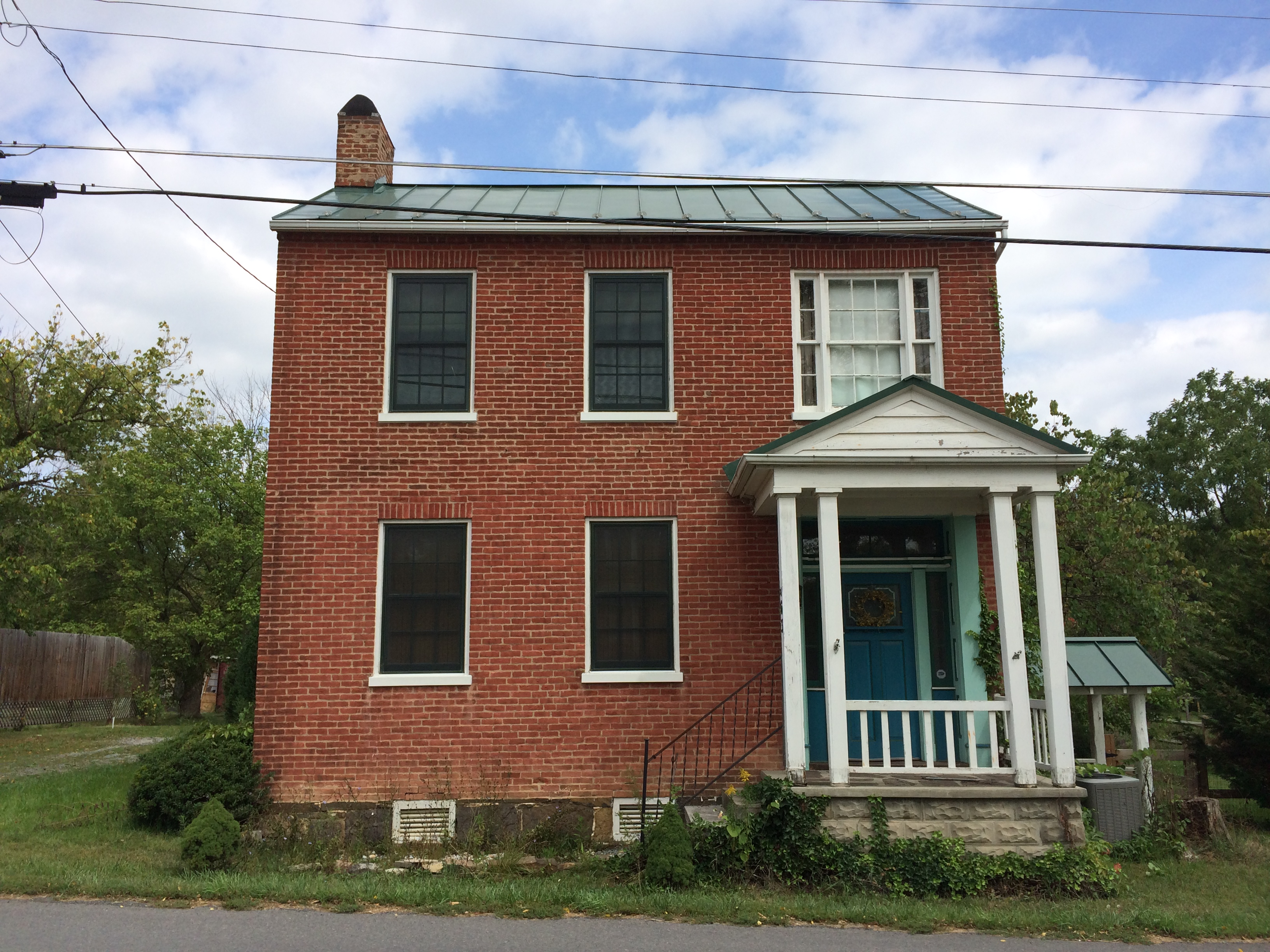
63 Springfield Pike (1860)

Today, Springfield is the site of a number of historic private residences dating from the 18th and 19th Centuries.

- 63 Springfield Pike (1860), Springfield Pike (CR 3)
- Ridgedale (George W. Washington Farm), Washington Bottom Road (CR 28/3)
- Frenchwood, Route 28 South and Market Street
  - The house is currently being restored. Captain John W. Shouse supposedly built the circa 1855 brick house.
- Springfield United Methodist Church, Vine Street
