= Allegheny Wildlife Management Area =

State Wildlife Management Area in Mineral County, West Virginia

- IUCN category V (protected landscape/seascape)
- Location within West Virginia
- Location: Mineral County, West Virginia, West Virginia, United States
- Coordinates: 39°23′45″N 79°4′7″W
- Area: 6,202 acres (25.10 km^{2})
- Operator: Wildlife Resources Section, WVDNR

The Allegheny Wildlife Management Area is located on 6,202 acres (25.1 km^{2}) on two separate tracts of mixed oak-hickory woodlands in western Mineral County along the Allegheny Front. The large land tract of 5,034 acres (2,037.2 ha) is accessible via Pinnacle Road (County Route 4) and Pine Swamp Road (County Route 220/2) four miles (6 km) southwest of Keyser. The smaller tract of 1,168 acres (4.7 km^{2}) is accessed by West Virginia Route 46 and Barnum Road (County Route 46/3) about 6 miles (10 km) north from Elk Garden. The Barnum Road tract consists of old farm fields along the river and the ridgetop, connected by steep slopes.

== Hunting and fishing ==
Hunting opportunities include bear, deer, grouse, squirrel and wild turkey. Trapping for fur can include bobcat, gray and red foxes and raccoon. Fishing in the North Branch of the Potomac River can produce smallmouth bass, panfish and trout.

Camping is not permitted in the WMA.

== Invasive species ==
The air-breathing northern snakehead fish have recently reported in the lower Potomac River. Although no snakeheads have been detected in West Virginia, this invasive species from northern China had been declared a threat to the state's aquatic ecosystem. Federal law prohibits transport of snakeheads across state lines. Anyone who catches this fish when visiting the Allegheny WMA should carefully note the catch location, kill the fish by cutting or bleeding, and contact a WVDNR district biologist. The snakehead should not be released back into the Potomac River or any tributary.

== See also ==
- Animal conservation
- Hunting
- List of West Virginia wildlife management areas
- Recreational fishing
