= Cross, West Virginia =

Unincorporated community in West Virginia, United States

Cross
- Unincorporated community
- Location within the state of West Virginia Cross (the United States)
- Coordinates: 39°25′48″N 79°5′30″W
- Country: United States
- State: West Virginia
- County: Mineral
- Time zone: UTC-5 (Eastern (EST))
  - Summer (DST): UTC-4 (EDT)
- GNIS feature ID: 1939809

Cross is an unincorporated community atop the Allegheny Plateau in the western part of Mineral County, West Virginia, United States. It is part of the Cumberland, MD-WV Metropolitan Statistical Area. Cross is located just east of Jennings Randolph Lake on West Virginia Route 46.
