= Mill Creek (Patterson Creek tributary) =

River in West Virginia, US

Coordinates: 39°20′08″N 78°54′52″W

Mill Creek is an 8.7-mile-long (14.0 km) tributary stream of Patterson Creek in Mineral County, West Virginia. It is also known as Mill Run.

== Headwaters and course ==
Mill Creek's headwaters is located between New Creek Mountain and Knobly Mountain where it begins its course flowing south between the two mountain ridges. The stream curves to the east and runs through Grayson Gap in Knobly Mountain. From Grayson Gap, Mill Creek meanders through the community of Antioch. It heads in a northeasterly direction towards the community of Markwood where Mill Creek parallels the Northwestern Turnpike (U.S. Route 50). The stream flows east through Mill Creek Country Club and to the rear of Travelers Rest. Mill Creek continues its eastern course to the south of US 50 where it is fed by Dry and Sugar Runs. After its confluence with Sugar Run, Mill Creek meanders through the town of Burlington before emptying into Patterson Creek.

== Tributaries ==
Tributary streams are listed from the source to the mouth.

- Parrill Run
- Dry Run
- Sugar Run

== See also ==
- List of rivers of West Virginia
