= Emeryville =

Emeryville may refer to:

- Emeryville, California
- Emeryville, Ontario
- Emeryville, predecessor of International Transtar, a model of International Harvester truck

== See also ==
- Emoryville
