= Patterson Creek, West Virginia =

Patterson Creek
- Unincorporated community
- Location within the state of West Virginia Patterson Creek (the United States)
- Coordinates: 39°34′0″N 78°43′59″W
- Country: United States
- State: West Virginia
- County: Mineral
- Elevation: 682 ft (208 m)
- Time zone: UTC-5 (Eastern (EST))
  - Summer (DST): UTC-4 (EDT)
- GNIS feature ID: 1555313

Patterson Creek is an unincorporated community in Mineral County, West Virginia, United States. It lies at the northeastern end of the county, and is named for Patterson Creek, which empties into the North Branch Potomac River here.
