= Headsville, West Virginia =

Headsville
- Unincorporated community
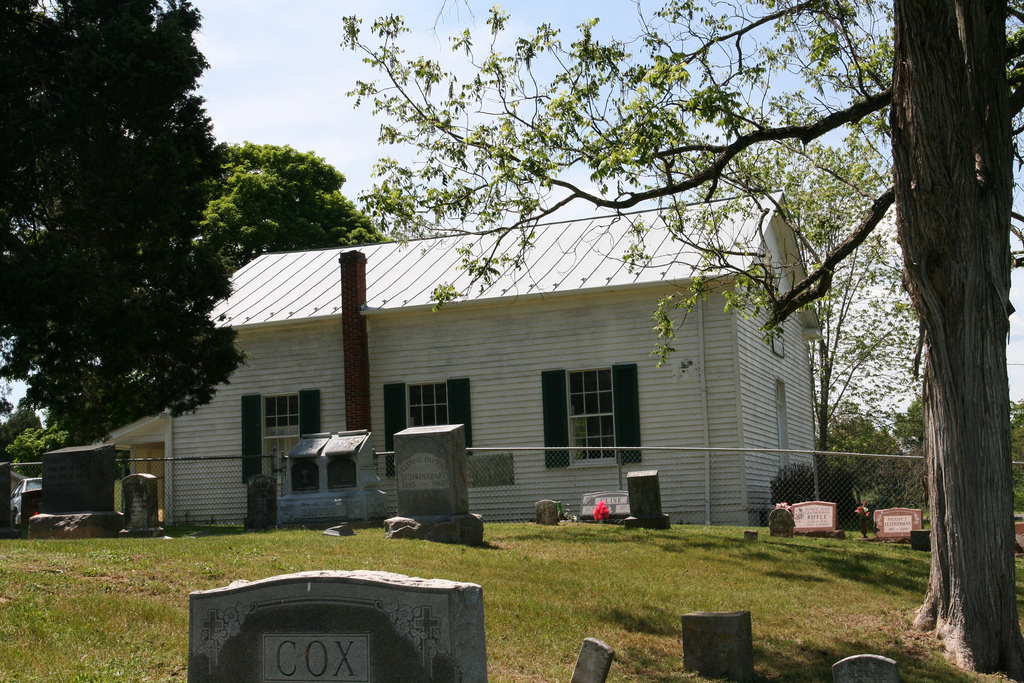
- Headsville United Methodist Church

- Location within the state of West Virginia Headsville (the United States)
- Coordinates: 39°23′33″N 78°51′21″W
- Country: United States
- State: West Virginia
- County: Mineral
- Elevation: 682 ft (208 m)
- Time zone: UTC-5 (Eastern (EST))
  - Summer (DST): UTC-4 (EDT)
- GNIS feature ID: 1554672

Headsville is an unincorporated community in Mineral County, West Virginia, United States. It is part of the Cumberland, MD-WV Metropolitan Statistical Area. It lies between U.S. Route 50 and West Virginia Route 46 alongside Pattersons Creek.

Fort Cocke of the French and Indian War was located near Headsville.

== History ==
The early settlement of Headsville began in the mid-18th century as settlers began to survey and patent land along the Patterson Creek. The village is located at the northern end of Patterson Creek Manor, a 9,000-acre land tract surveyed for Lord Fairfax in 1747. George Washington ordered the construction of Fort Cocke by Captain William Cocke in 1775 on a site along Patterson Creek just south of Headsville. The small palisade fort was abandoned during the French and Indian War. Early names for the community included "Sheetz's Mill."

The Headsville United Methodist Church began worshiping in the mid-19th century on the Parker Farm. In 1856, James Carskadon, Rev. Isaac H. Carskadon, and Henry Head oversaw the construction of a frame church on a small knoll overlooking Patterson Creek at the site of the Parker Family burial ground. The church is still in use and remains a well-preserved example of ante-bellum, rural church buildings.

== Post office ==
The original Headsville Post Office was chartered in 1813 as "Sheetz's Mill." The first postmaster was Charles Marshall. This first post office was closed in 1815, reopened in 1828 and then closed again in 1866. The Headsville Post Office was chartered on March 5, 1868 and continued operation until December 31, 1951. At the time of its closure, the post office had occupied the same building for longer than any such establishment in the United States. It was purchased by the Smithsonian Institution and moved to Washington, D.C. where it reopened in 1971 in the National Museum of American History.

After 35 years as a working model of a 19th-century post office and general store, the historic Headsville Post Office shut its doors when the museum was closed for renovation in 2006, and plans were made to reopen it at the American Philatelic Center in Bellefonte, Pennsylvania, headquarters of the American Philatelic Society.

A specially prepared climate-controlled pavilion was prepared to house the Headsville post office, named for former Third Assistant Postmaster General Gordon C. Morison and his wife Mary, who did much to promote stamp collecting. The pavilion was dedicated October 20, 2007. The first shipment of the expertly dismantled Headsville post office, carefully crated by the Smithsonian for transport, arrived in late 2007 and early 2008, and was reassembled in Bellefonte after the Morison Pavilion had been tested for environmental suitability. The historic Headsville Post Office was reopened as a Contract Post Office on March 3, 2008.
