= Stewart's Tavern =

- U.S. National Register of Historic Places
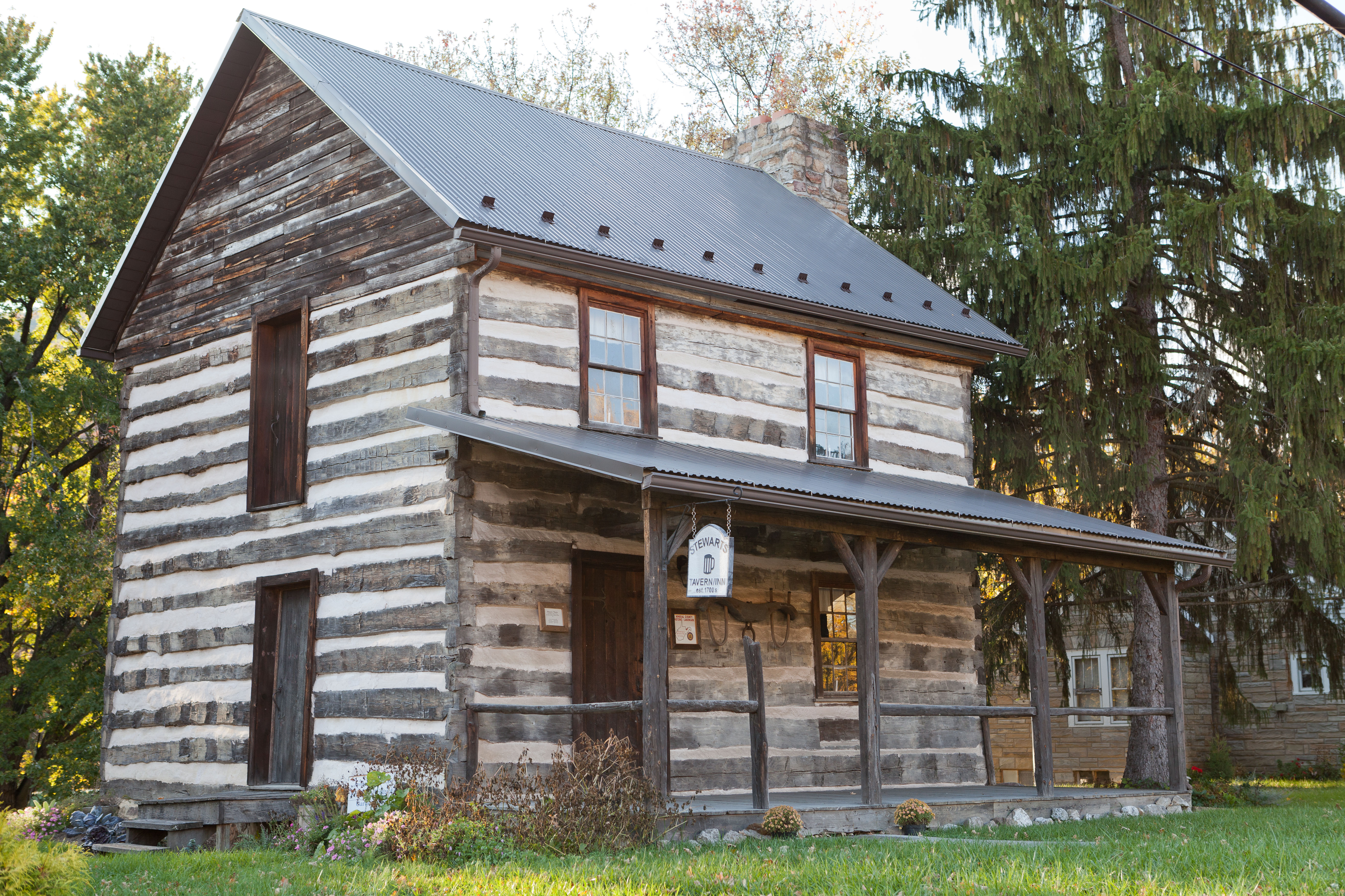
- Stewart's Tavern, October 2012

- Location within Eastern Panhandle of West Virginia Location within West Virginia Location within the United States
- Location: Short Gap Rd., near Short Gap, West Virginia
- Coordinates: 39°32′38″N 78°48′44″W
- Area: 0.1 acres (0.040 ha)
- NRHP reference No.: 00000776
- Added to NRHP: July 14, 2000

Stewart's Tavern, also known as John Stewart's Tavern Inn, is a historic inn and tavern located near Short Gap, Mineral County, West Virginia. It is a 2 1/2 story building that was built in the latter part of the 18th century with hand hewn chestnut logs having steeple notching. It sits on a stone foundation and has a side gable roof. The building was purchased by the Frankfort District Historical Society in 1988, and moved in 1989 approximately 60 feet from its original location to its present site.

It was listed on the National Register of Historic Places in 2000.
