= Patterson Creek =

Tributary of the North Branch Potomac River in West Virginia

Coordinates: 39°33′50″N 78°43′29″W

Patterson Creek is a 51.2-mile-long (82.4 km) tributary of the North Branch Potomac River in West Virginia's Eastern Panhandle, in the United States. It enters the North Branch east of Cumberland, Maryland, with its headwaters located in Grant County, West Virginia. Patterson Creek is the watershed for two-thirds of Mineral County, West Virginia. The creek passes through Lahmansville, Forman, Medley, Williamsport, Burlington, Headsville, Reeses Mill, Champwood, and Fort Ashby.

== History ==
The creek most likely was named after the local Patterson family. The place at which Patterson Creek joins the North Branch Potomac River was once known as Patterson Depot.

== Infrastructure ==
=== Tributaries ===
- Mill Creek

=== Bridges ===
Bridge	Route	Location
Rada Road Bridge	Rada Road	2 miles south of Burlington
Northwestern Turnpike Bridge	US 50	Burlington
Fort Cocke Bridge	Cabin Run Road	Headsville
Camp Minco Bridge	Patterson Creek Road	Camp Minco
West Virginia Route 46 Bridge	WV 46	Intersection of WV 46 and Patterson Creek Road
George Run Road Bridge	George Run	5 miles east of Fort Ashby
William E. Shuck Memorial Bridge	WV 28	Fort Ashby
Low Water Bridge	Dan's Run Road	Patterson Creek
B&O Railroad	B&O Main Line	Patterson Creek

== Recreation ==
=== Fishing ===
Multiple West Virginia stage record fish were caught along the Patterson Creek.

== See also ==
- Patterson Creek Cutoff
- List of rivers of West Virginia
