= Keymont, West Virginia =

Unincorporated community in West Virginia, US

Coordinates: 39°27′55″N 79°01′07″W

Keymont is an unincorporated community in Mineral County, West Virginia, United States, located between Keyser and Piedmont on State Route 46.
