= Champwood, West Virginia =

Unincorporated community in West Virginia, United States

Champwood
- Unincorporated community
- Location within the state of West Virginia Champwood (the United States)
- Coordinates: 39°26′36″N 78°49′09″W
- Country: United States
- State: West Virginia
- County: Mineral
- Elevation: 637 ft (194 m)
- Time zone: UTC-5 (Eastern (EST))
  - Summer (DST): UTC-4 (EDT)
- GNIS feature ID: 1554107

Champwood is an unincorporated community on Patterson Creek in Mineral County, West Virginia, United States. It is part of the 'Cumberland, MD-WV Metropolitan Statistical Area'. Champwood lies along West Virginia Route 46.

The name is a portmanteau of Champ Clark and Woodrow Wilson, who were, respectively, an early settler and the U.S. President.
