= Noswad, West Virginia =

Noswad
- Unincorporated community
- Location within the state of West Virginia Noswad (the United States)
- Coordinates: 39°28′51″N 78°55′34″W
- Country: United States
- State: West Virginia
- County: Mineral
- Elevation: 781 ft (238 m)
- Time zone: UTC-5 (Eastern (EST))
  - Summer (DST): UTC-4 (EDT)
- GNIS ID: 1557053

Noswad was an unincorporated community in Mineral County, West Virginia, United States.
