= West Virginia Route 956 =

State highway in West Virginia, United States

West Virginia Route 956

Route information
- Maintained by WVDOH
- Length: 4.18 mi (6.73 km)

Major junctions
- West end: MD 956 near Rocket Center
- East end: WV 28 in Short Gap

Location
- Country: United States
- State: West Virginia
- Counties: Mineral

Highway system
- West Virginia State Highway System; Interstate; US; State
← WV 901	→ WV 971

West Virginia Route 956 (WV 956) is an east–west state highway in the northeastern portion of the U.S. state of West Virginia. The western terminus of WV 956 is at the Maryland state line at Rocket Center, where it becomes Maryland Route 956 (MD 956) at the Potomac River crossing. Its eastern terminus is at a T-intersection with WV 28 at Short Gap. Along its path, WV 956 passes over Knobly Mountain. WV 956 was formerly County Route 9/6.

== Route description ==
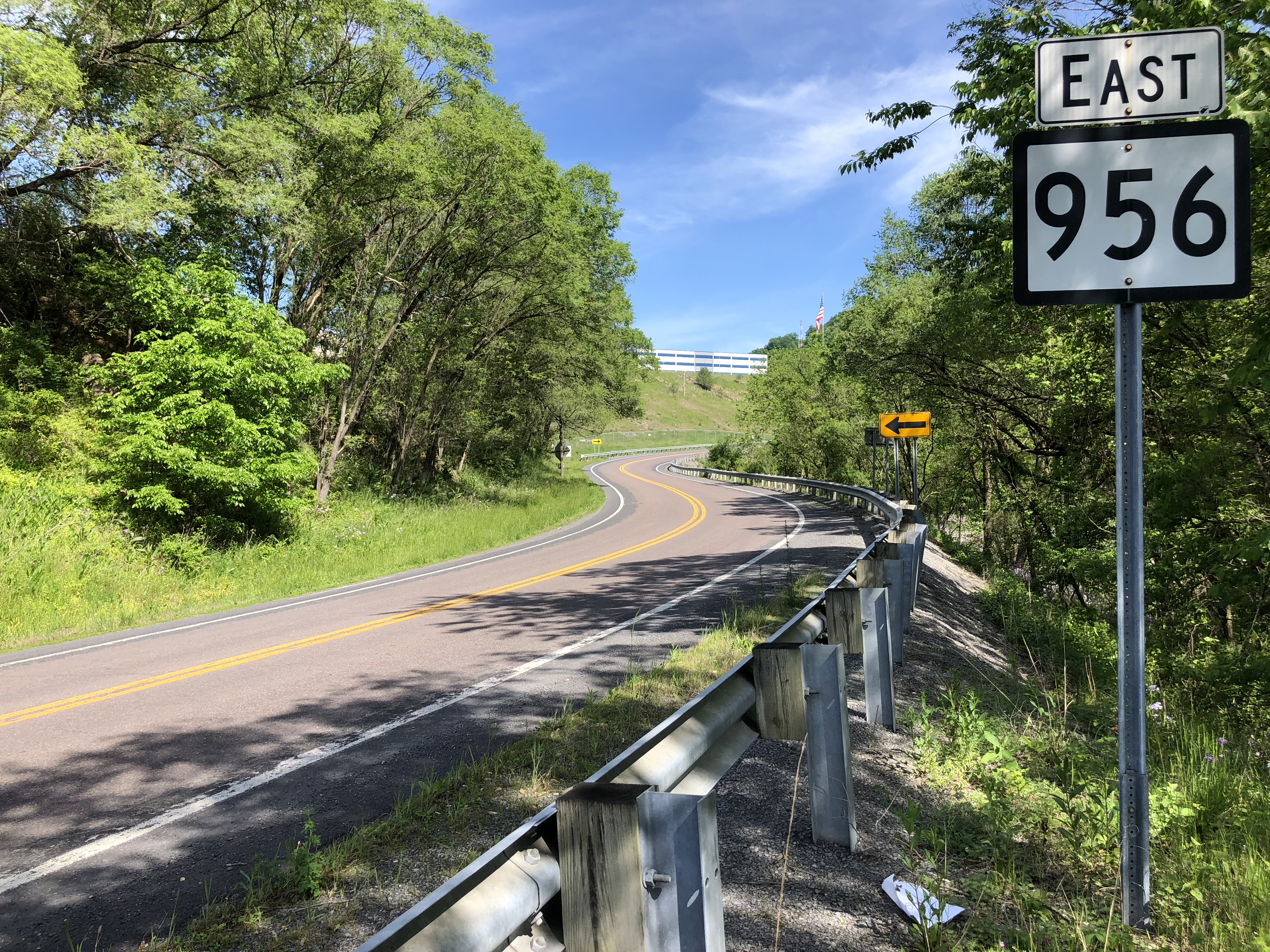
View east along WV 956 in Mineral County

WV 956 runs entirely within Mineral County. The two-lane highway begins at the Maryland state line on the bridge over the Potomac River at Rocket Center. Here, it continues the alignment of MD 956, which begins shortly northwest of this point at U.S. Route 220 (US 220). Heading southeast from the state line, WV 956 provides access to Allegany Ballistics Laboratory. The route then crosses Knobley Mountain, following a winding path through heavily wooded terrain. WV 956 straightens as it descends the mountain to the southeast. Arriving in Short Gap, WV 956 ends at a T-intersection with WV 28.

Two semi-major roads connect to WV 956, Knobley Road (Mineral County Route 9), 0.1 miles from WV 28, and Waxler Road (Mineral County Route 8), 2.2 miles from WV 28.

== Major intersections ==
The entire route is in Mineral County.

Location	mi	km	Destinations	Notes
Rocket Center	4.18	6.73	MD 956 west	Maryland state line (Pinto Bridge over North Branch Potomac River)
Short Gap	0.00	0.00	WV 28	
1.000 mi = 1.609 km; 1.000 km = 0.621 mi
