= Mineral County Courthouse =

Mineral County Courthouse may refer to:

- Mineral County Courthouse (Colorado), Creede, Colorado
- Mineral County Courthouse (Nevada), Hawthorne, Nevada
- Mineral County Courthouse (West Virginia), Keyser, West Virginia
