= Nethkin, West Virginia =

Nethkin
- Unincorporated community
- Location within the state of West Virginia Nethkin (the United States)
- Coordinates: 39°23′24″N 79°8′1″W
- Country: United States
- State: West Virginia
- County: Mineral
- Time zone: UTC-5 (Eastern (EST))
  - Summer (DST): UTC-4 (EDT)
- GNIS feature ID: 1555201

Nethkin is an unincorporated community in Mineral County, West Virginia, United States. Nethkin lies to the east of Elk Garden.

The community was named after Reese Nethken.
