= HoPWF Six-Man Tag Team Championship =

Professional wrestling trios tag team championship

Details
- Promotion: House of Pain Wrestling Federation
Statistics
- First champions: Slickyboy, Brian Anthony and Paul Beswick
- Most reigns: N/A
- Longest reign: The Highwaymen (80 days)
- Shortest reign: Slickyboy, Brian Anthony and Paul Beswick (26 days)

The HoPWF Six-Man Tag Team Championship was a professional wrestling tag team title in the House of Pain Wrestling Federation promotion. It was created on October 5, 1999, when Slickyboy, Brian Anthony and Paul Beswick won a championship tournament in Hagerstown, Maryland. The title was defended primarily in the Mid-Atlantic and East Coast, most often in Maryland, but also in Pennsylvania and West Virginia until its retirement on January 12, 2001. There are 6 recognized teams with a total of 6 title reigns.

== Title history ==
| Wrestler: | Times: | Date: | Location: | Notes: |
|---|---|---|---|---|
| Slickyboy, Brian Anthony and Paul Beswick | 1 | October 5, 1999 | Hagerstown, Maryland | Won tournament to become the first champions. |
| Cannonball, Bruiser Blackwell and Body Bag | 1 | October 31, 1999 | Elk Garden, West Virginia | Awarded titles by forfeit. |
The titles are vacated on January 4, 2000, when Body Bag left the promotion.
| The Highwaymen (Leslie Leatherman, Jake Davis and Tate Griffen) | 1 | March 11, 2000 | Keyser, West Virginia | Defeated Gutterboy, OGB and Brian Anthony to win the vacant titles. |
| Jerkface, Jimmy Jessup and Frank Savage | 1 | May 30, 2000 | Hagerstown, Maryland | |
| The Mighty Biggs | 1 | August 15, 2000 | Hagerstown, Maryland | |
The titles are vacated in November 2000.
| Aidean, Flex Fenom and Spazman Anthony | 1 | November 28, 2000 | | Defeated Leslie Leatherman, Jake Davis and Jimmy Jessup in a tournament final to win the vacant titles. |
The titles are abandoned on January 12, 2001.
