= Fountain, West Virginia =

Unincorporated community in West Virginia, United States

Fountain
- Unincorporated community
- Location within the state of West Virginia Fountain (the United States)
- Coordinates: 39°25′16″N 78°56′13″W
- Country: United States
- State: West Virginia
- County: Mineral
- Elevation: 942 ft (287 m)
- Time zone: UTC-5 (Eastern (EST))
  - Summer (DST): UTC-4 (EDT)
- GNIS feature ID: 1539173

Fountain is an unincorporated community in Mineral County, West Virginia, United States, located at the intersection of West Virginia Route 46 and Knobley Road.
