= Russelldale, West Virginia =

Russelldale
- Unincorporated community
- Location within the state of West Virginia Russelldale (the United States)
- Coordinates: 39°17′33″N 78°55′48″W
- Country: United States
- State: West Virginia
- County: Mineral
- Elevation: 879 ft (268 m)
- Time zone: UTC-5 (Eastern (EST))
  - Summer (DST): UTC-4 (EDT)
- GNIS feature ID: 1555543

Russelldale is an unincorporated community in Mineral County, West Virginia, United States. Russelldale is located on Patterson Creek Mountain to the east of Patterson Creek.
