= Knobmount, West Virginia =

Knobmount
- Unincorporated community
- Location within the state of West Virginia Knobmount (the United States)
- Coordinates: 39°37′43″N 78°47′24″W
- Country: United States
- State: West Virginia
- County: Mineral
- Elevation: 735 ft (224 m)
- Time zone: UTC-5 (Eastern (EST))
  - Summer (DST): UTC-4 (EDT)
- GNIS ID: 1717886

Knobmount is an unincorporated community in Mineral County, West Virginia, United States.
