= Oakmont, West Virginia =

Oakmont
- Unincorporated community
- Location within the state of West Virginia Oakmont (the United States)
- Coordinates: 39°22′00″N 79°11′18″W
- Country: United States
- State: West Virginia
- County: Mineral
- Elevation: 1,805 ft (550 m)
- Time zone: UTC-5 (Eastern (EST))
  - Summer (DST): UTC-4 (EDT)
- GNIS feature ID: 1544316

Oakmont is an unincorporated community and coal town located in Mineral County, West Virginia, United States. Oakmont is located on Abram Creek.

A variant name was Oakdale.
