= Jennings Randolph Lake =

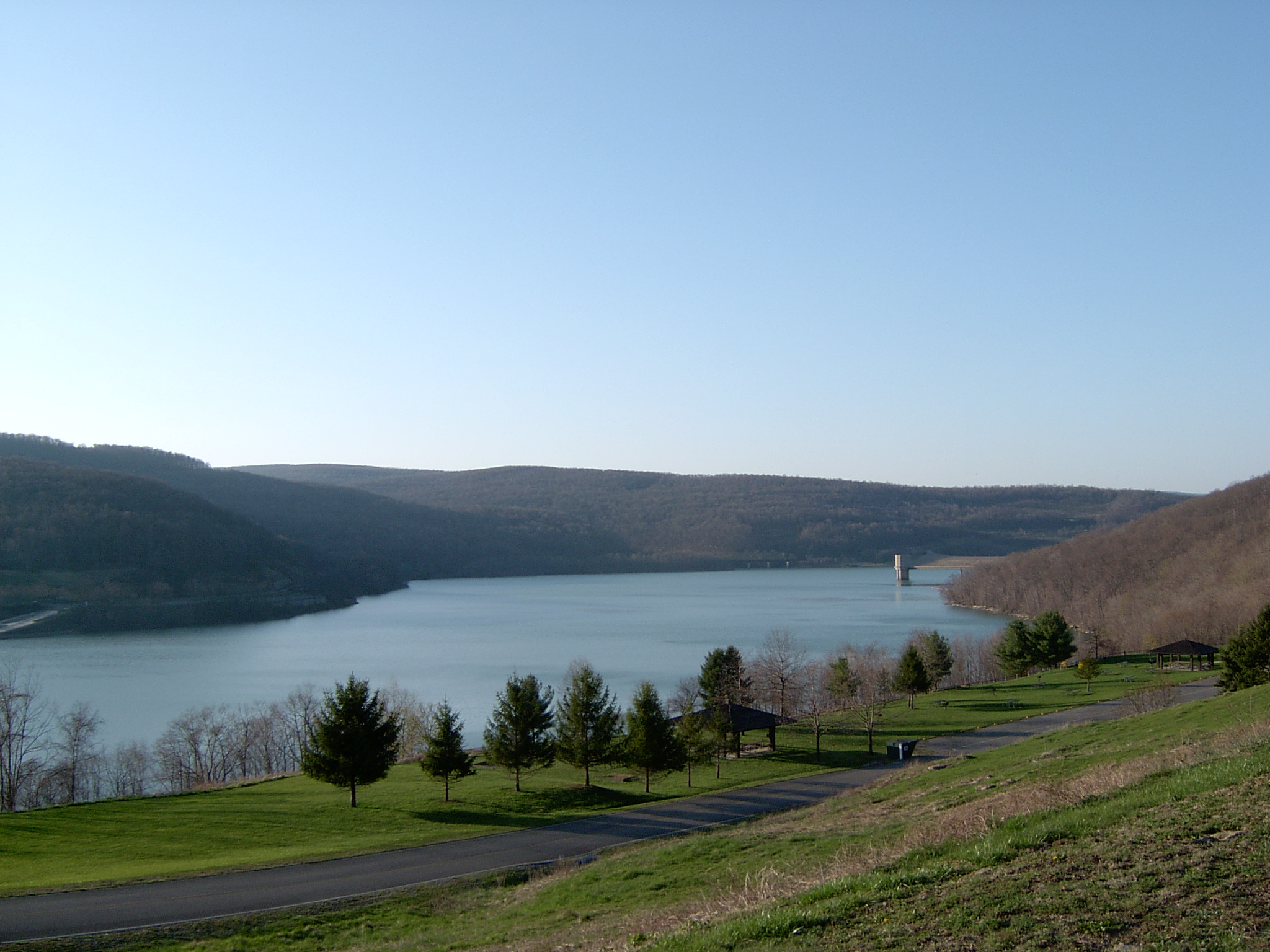
- Jennings Randolph Lake in 2005.

- Location within West Virginia Location within Maryland Location within the United States
- Location: Garrett County, Maryland / Mineral County, West Virginia, United States
- Coordinates: 39°25′57″N 79°07′18″W
- Type: reservoir
- Primary inflows: North Branch Potomac River
- Primary outflows: North Branch Potomac River
- Basin countries: United States
- Max. length: 6.6 miles (10.6 km)
- Surface area: 952 acres (3.85 km^{2})
- Max. depth: 296 ft (90 m)
- Surface elevation: 1,460 ft (450 m)

Jennings Randolph Lake is a reservoir of 952 acres (3.85 km^{2}) located on the North Branch Potomac River in Garrett County, Maryland, and Mineral County, West Virginia. It is approximately 8 miles (13 km) upstream of Bloomington, Maryland, and approximately 5 miles (8.0 km) north of Elk Garden, West Virginia.

== Construction and management ==
The lake was constructed by the U.S. Army Corps of Engineers (USACE), as authorized by the Flood Control Act of October 23, 1962 (Public Law 87-874) and is described in House Document No. 469, 87th United States Congress, second session. Originally named "Bloomington Dam", it was renamed Jennings Randolph Lake in 1987 to honor the US Senator from West Virginia who was instrumental in this and many other water resource projects across the nation. Construction of the lake was completed in 1981, and resulted in the flooding of the community of Shaw, West Virginia and the realignment of West Virginia Route 46. The dam, rolled earth and rock fill, is 296 feet (90 m) high, has a crest length of 2,130 feet (650 m) and contains 10 million cubic yards (7.6×10^{6} m^{3}) of material. Jennings Randolph Lake strives to provide water quality improvements and reduce flood damages downstream of the lake, provide a source of water supply for downstream municipalities and industries, and provide the public with recreation opportunities. With a full conservation pool, the lake controls a drainage area of 263 square miles (680 km^{2}), is about 5.5 miles (8.9 km) long, and has a surface area of 952 acres (385 ha). The lake serves as an emergency reservoir for the Washington, D.C. metropolitan area and is managed by the Corps of Engineers. Coordination of the lake's use for water supply purposes is managed by the Interstate Commission on the Potomac River Basin (ICPRB).

The impoundment also collects acid mine drainage from coal mines located upstream, which improves the water quality of the river downstream.

== Planned hydroelectric facility ==
In 2008 Fairlawn Hydroelectric Company filed a proposal with the Federal Energy Regulatory Commission (FERC) to construct a hydroelectric facility at the dam. FERC approved a license for a 14 MW facility on April 30, 2012. In 2016, Fairlawn Hydroelectric reported that it had not yet obtained construction permits from USACE, and it obtained an extension of time from FERC to begin and complete the project.

== Recreational facilities ==
- Howell Run Picnic Area
- Howell Run Boat Launch
- Robert W. Craig Campground
- Shaw Beach
- West Virginia Overlook
- Maryland Overlook
- Maryland Boat Launch

== See also ==
- List of lakes of West Virginia
