= Medley, West Virginia =

- Unincorporated community
- Location within West Virginia Location within the United States
- Coordinates: 39°10′34″N 79°3′28″W
- Country: United States
- State: West Virginia
- County: Grant
- Time zone: UTC-5 (Eastern (EST))
  - Summer (DST): UTC-4 (EDT)
- GNIS feature ID: 1543107

Medley is an unincorporated community on Patterson Creek in Grant County, West Virginia, United States.

The community most likely was named after the local Medley family.
