= Laurel Dale, West Virginia =

Laurel Dale
- Unincorporated community
- Location within the state of West Virginia Laurel Dale (the United States)
- Coordinates: 39°18′30″N 79°05′31″W
- Country: United States
- State: West Virginia
- County: Mineral
- Elevation: 1,289 ft (393 m)
- Time zone: UTC-5 (Eastern (EST))
  - Summer (DST): UTC-4 (EDT)
- GNIS feature ID: 1549779

Laurel Dale is an unincorporated community on New Creek in Mineral County, West Virginia, United States. Laurel Dale was established in 1878. The community is located along West Virginia Route 93.

The community was named for laurel plants near the original town site.
