= Reeses Mill, West Virginia =

Reeses Mill
- Unincorporated community
- Location within the state of West Virginia Reeses Mill (the United States)
- Coordinates: 39°25′50″N 78°51′17″W
- Country: United States
- State: West Virginia
- County: Mineral
- Elevation: 663 ft (202 m)
- Time zone: UTC-5 (Eastern (EST))
  - Summer (DST): UTC-4 (EDT)
- GNIS feature ID: 1555461

Reeses Mill is an unincorporated community on Patterson Creek in Mineral County, West Virginia, United States. Reeses Mill is home to Camp Minco.
