= Markwood, West Virginia =

Markwood
- Unincorporated community
- Location within the state of West Virginia Markwood (the United States)
- Coordinates: 39°20′07″N 78°57′50″W
- Country: United States
- State: West Virginia
- County: Mineral
- Elevation: 856 ft (261 m)
- Time zone: UTC-5 (Eastern (EST))
  - Summer (DST): UTC-4 (EDT)
- ZIP codes: 26710
- GNIS feature ID: 1717889

Markwood is an unincorporated community located along U.S. Route 50/U.S. Route 220 (also known as the Northwestern Turnpike) in the Mill Creek Valley west of Burlington in Mineral County, West Virginia, United States. The ZIP code for Markwood is 26710.

== Historic sites ==
- Travelers Rest Travelers Rest is located on U.S Route 50, west of Burlington in Mineral County. It was built for the wagon trains going west and would house the travelers in a large rock house, and feed and water the horses before going over the mountains. Currently it is better known as the "Stone House".

John T. McDowell (born 1870) and Luke Markwood, saw a need for a place of worship. Mr. Markwood donated the land upon which was built a church and a school, therefore giving the community the name of Markwood.
