= Forman, West Virginia =

Unincorporated community in West Virginia, United States

- Unincorporated community
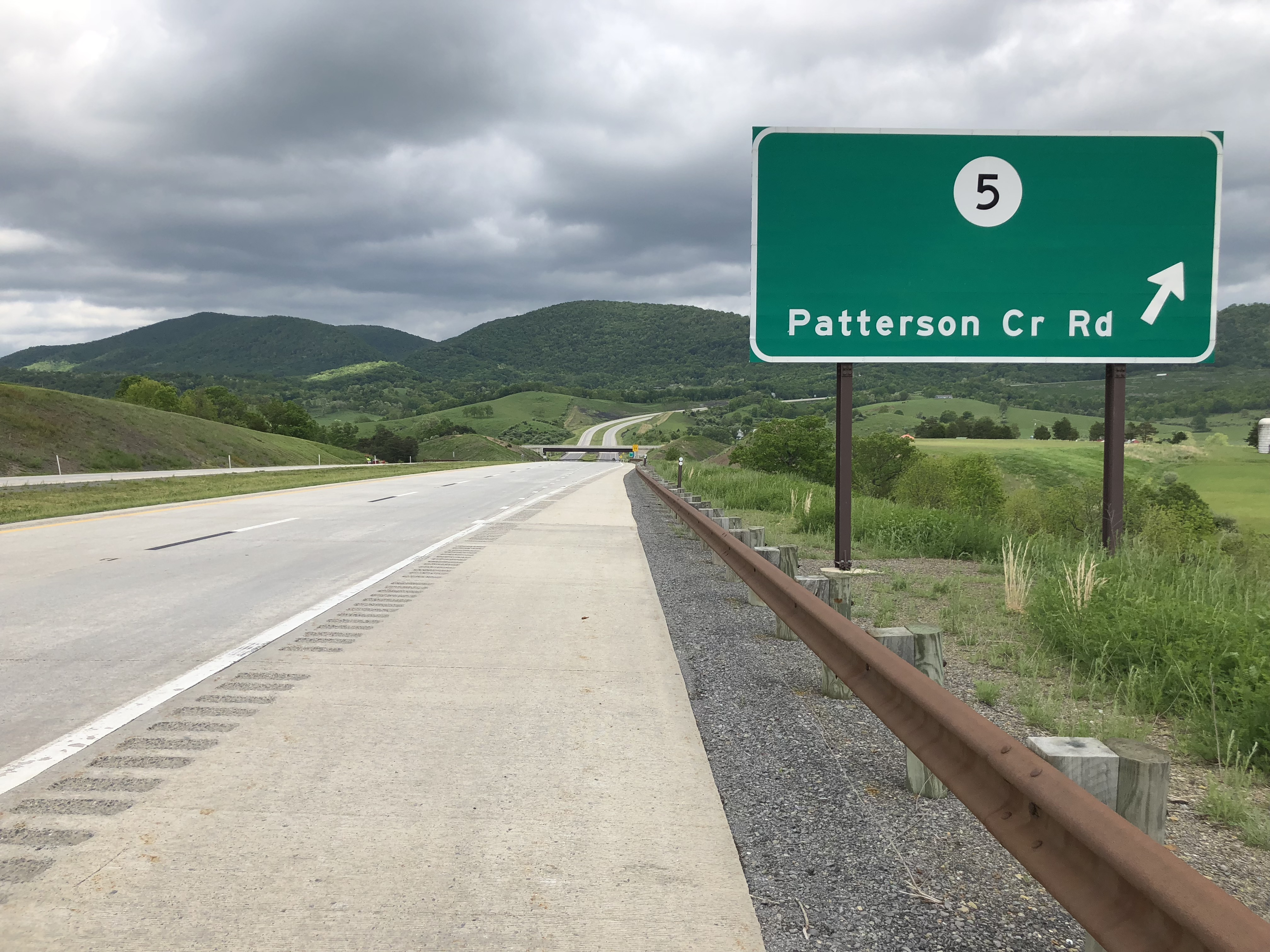
- U.S. Route 48 in Forman

- Location within West Virginia Location within the United States
- Coordinates: 39°8′24″N 79°4′30″W
- Country: United States
- State: West Virginia
- County: Grant
- Time zone: UTC-5 (Eastern (EST))
  - Summer (DST): UTC-4 (EDT)
- GNIS feature ID: 1549690

Forman is an unincorporated community on Patterson Creek in Grant County, West Virginia, United States.

The community was named after L. J. Forman, who was instrumental in securing a post office for the town.
