= Shaw, West Virginia =

Former town in Mineral County, West Virginia, United States

Coordinates: 39.4162074°N 79.1305887°W

Shaw is a former town in Mineral County, in the U.S. state of West Virginia.

== History ==
A post office called Shaw was established in 1881, and remained in operation until 1973. The community was named after Major Alexander Shaw, a railroad official. The town site was inundated and destroyed by the creation of Jennings Randolph Lake.
