= Short Gap, West Virginia =

Short Gap
- Unincorporated community
- Location within the state of West Virginia Short Gap (the United States)
- Coordinates: 39°32′37″N 78°48′40″W
- Country: United States
- State: West Virginia
- County: Mineral
- Elevation: 814 ft (248 m)
- Time zone: UTC-5 (Eastern (EST))
  - Summer (DST): UTC-4 (EDT)
- ZIP codes: 26753, 26726
- GNIS feature ID: 1546727

Short Gap is an unincorporated community in Mineral County, West Virginia, United States, at the intersection of Routes 956 and 28, approximately eight miles from Cumberland, Maryland. The community is home to Frankfort High School, Frankfort Middle School, and Frankfort Elementary School, which serve the northern part of Mineral County, including students from the towns of Ridgeley and Fort Ashby. The ZIP codes for Short Gap are 26753 (Ridgeley, West Virginia) and 26726 (Keyser, West Virginia).

Located in Short Gap on Knobley Road is Stewart's Tavern, listed on the National Register of Historic Places in 2000.

== Notable people ==
- Missy Raines (born 1962), musician
- Dave Roberts (1944–2009), Major League Baseball pitcher
