= USS Mineral County =

1944 LST-542-class tank landing ship

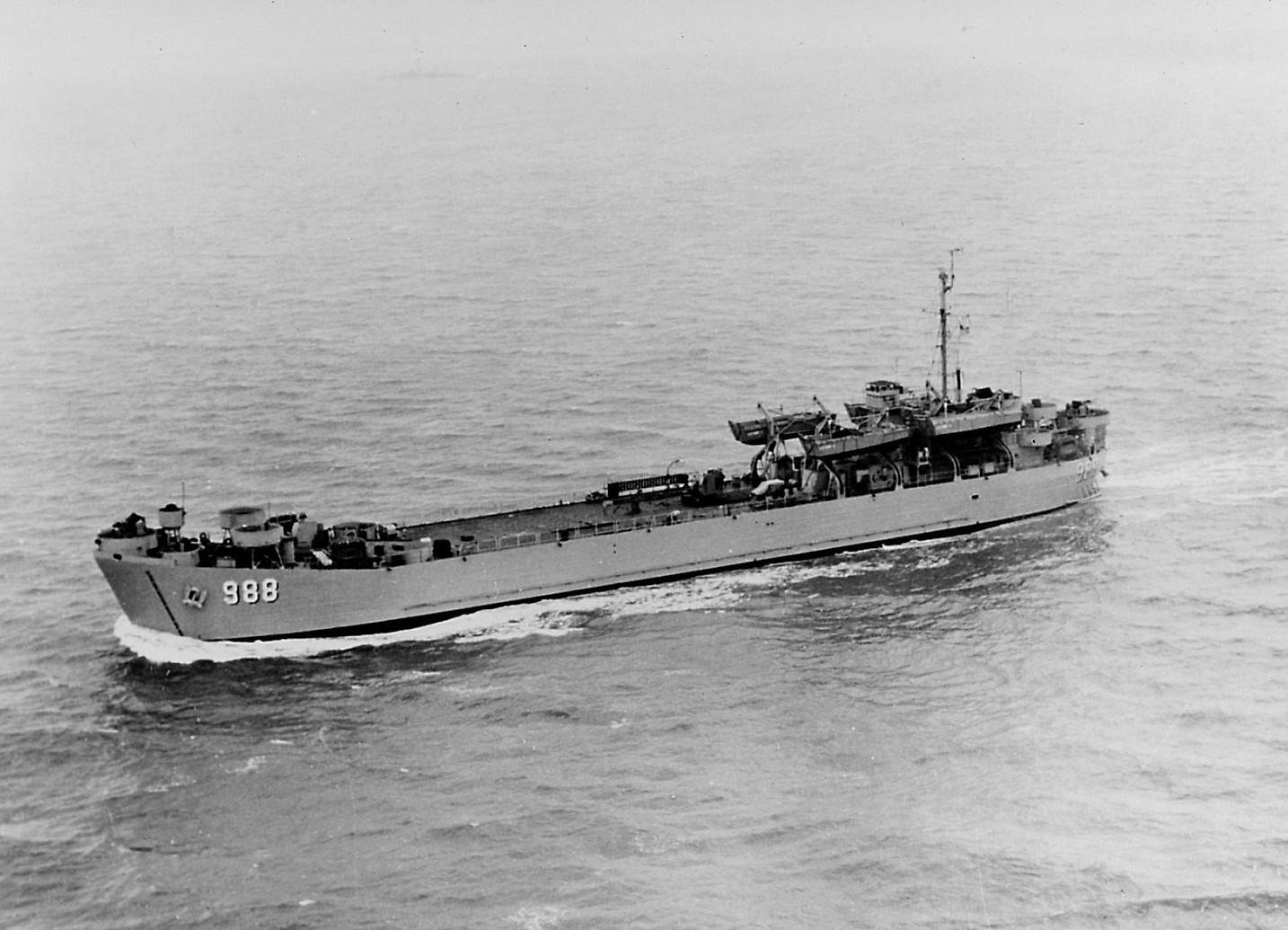
- Mineral County underway, circa 1950s

History

United States
- Name: USS LST-988
- Builder: Boston Navy Yard, Massachusetts
- Laid down: 10 February 1944
- Launched: 12 March 1944
- Commissioned: 25 April 1944
- Decommissioned: 13 June 1950
- Recommissioned: 7 June 1951
- Decommissioned: 11 October 1957
- Renamed: USS Mineral County (LST-988), 1 July 1955
- Stricken: 27 September 1957
- Honors and awards: 1 battle star (World War II)
- Fate: Sunk as a target

General characteristics
- Class & type: LST-542-class tank landing ship
- Displacement: 1,625 long tons (1,651 t) light; 4,080 long tons (4,145 t) full
- Length: 328 ft (100 m)
- Beam: 50 ft (15 m)
- Draft: Unloaded : 2 ft 4 in (0.71 m) forward; 7 ft 6 in (2.29 m) aft; Loaded : 8 ft 2 in (2.49 m) forward; 14 ft 1 in (4.29 m) aft
- Propulsion: 2 × General Motors 12-567 diesel engines, two shafts, twin rudders
- Speed: 12 knots (22 km/h; 14 mph)
- Boats & landing craft carried: 2 × LCVPs
- Troops: 16 officers, 147 enlisted men
- Complement: 7 officers, 104 enlisted men
- Armament: 8 × 40 mm guns; 12 × 20 mm guns

USS Mineral County (LST-988) was an LST-542-class tank landing ship built for the United States Navy during World War II. Named after Mineral County, West Virginia, she was the only U.S. Naval vessel to bear the name.

Originally laid down as LST-988 at the Boston Navy Yard on 10 February 1944, the ship was launched on 12 March 1944, sponsored by Mrs. Winfred K. Buckmaster, and commissioned on 25 April 1944.

== Service history ==
=== World War II, 1944–1945 ===
Following shakedown out of Little Creek, Virginia, LST-988 departed the Norfolk area on 2 June 1944 in a convoy bound for Bizerte, Tunisia. Arriving on the 22nd, she discharged her Seabee passengers and equipment and took on troops and rolling stock to be transported to Italy. She anchored at Naples on 2 July and for the next month shuttled troops and equipment along the Italian coast, to Sicily and to Corsica.

On 12 August, with Army personnel as passengers and their tanks and other vehicles as her cargo, she departed Naples for the invasion of southern France. By 0800, on 15 August, she stood off Saint-Raphaël awaiting her first beaching on enemy held shores under fire. Moving in at 1745, she had completed unloading by 1945. The following day she headed for Corsica and until 6 October shuttled troops, American and French, from Ajaccio, Corsica and Oran, Algiers to Saint-Raphaël and Marseille. During October she completed runs to Italy and Tunisia, returning in November to the Corsica-Marseille route. She completed her final Mediterranean assignment, Marseille-Bizerte-Oran, in mid-December and on the 28th got underway for Norfolk, Virginia. Arriving on 14 January 1945 she steamed to New York for overhaul, returning to Virginia in March to take on vehicles for Pearl Harbor.

Underway on 1 April, she joined a convoy for the Panama Canal Zone, thence, on 15 May, steamed north to San Francisco where she loaded explosives and ammunition for use in the western Pacific. By the end of June she had discharged her Hawaiian cargo and by 6 July was en route to Eniwetok and Guam. After off-loading her dangerous cargo at the latter island, she received word of the Japanese surrender and orders to continue transportation services in the Marshalls and Marianas.

=== Post-war activities, 1945–1946 ===
On 14 September she departed Saipan for the Philippines to begin duty with the 3rd Amphibious Force, Pacific Fleet. From the 26th until 19 November, she operated between Subic Bay and Yokohama, carrying Army occupation personnel and their equipment on the first leg of their journey to their assigned stations in the former enemy's home islands. LST-988 then commenced occupation service of her own, the transportation of cargo and passengers amongst various Japanese ports from Honshū to Kyūshū. Detached 11 April 1946, she began to make her way back to the United States. She arrived at San Francisco on 27 May, thence steamed through the Panama Canal and arrived at New York City on 13 July.

=== Naval Reserve training vessel, 1946–1950 ===
Under orders from the commandant, 3rd Naval District, she decommissioned and was placed in reserve on 25 July and, after overhaul, was placed in service on 13 January 1946 for employment as a Naval Reserve training vessel for the New York area. On 6 April 1950 she reported for inactivation at Philadelphia, and on 13 June was officially designated out of commission, in reserve. Towed to Florida the following week, she was berthed at Green Cove Springs as a unit of the Atlantic Reserve Fleet.

=== Cargo and personnel carrier, 1951–1957 ===
Shortly after her berthing at Green Cove Springs, the reopening of hostilities in Asia and high tension in Europe and the Middle East resulted in an increased demand for ships of her type. LST-988 was ordered reactivated. On 7 June 1951 she recommissioned and 13 days later reported to ServLant for duty as a troop and cargo carrier. Her assignments during the next year took her as far east as the Mediterranean and as far north as sailing beyond the arctic circle on 9 July 1952. In May 1952 she was fitted out with a helicopter pad and then ordered to Iceland for special projects with the United States Air Force. Returning to Norfolk in September, she prepared for her first extended oversea deployment since World War II, six months with the 6th Fleet in the Mediterranean, after which she resumed operations for the 2nd Fleet.

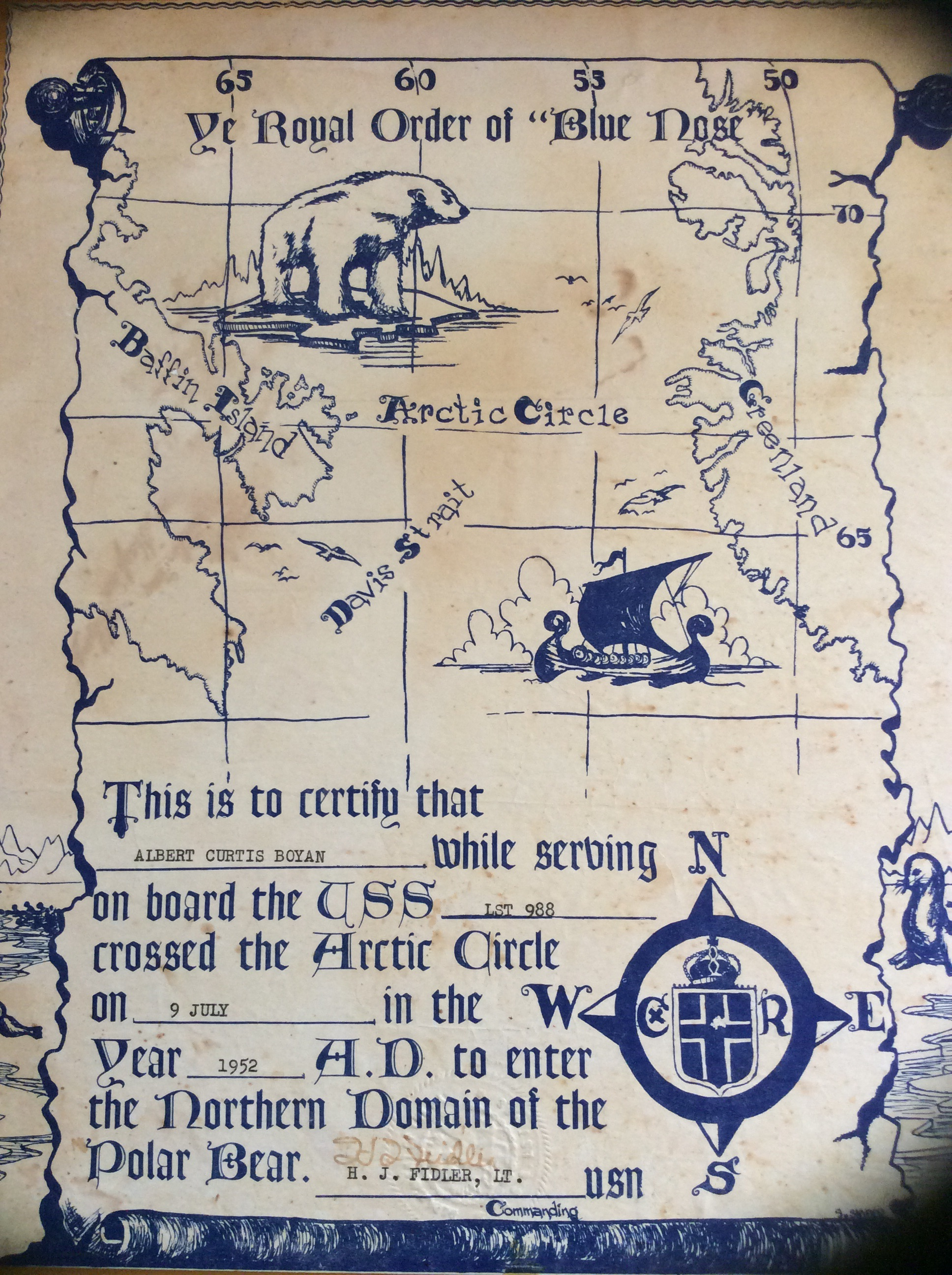
LST 988 Blue Nose Certificate Granted to A.C. Boyan on 9 July 1952

In November 1953 she commenced work as cargo and personnel carrier, helicopter supply ship, and LORAC team unit for the Navy's Hydrographic Office, then engaged in scientific research in and resurvey of the Atlantic. Renamed USS Mineral County (LST-988) on 1 July 1955, she continued to serve the Hydrographic Office until the spring of 1957 when she was ordered to prepare for inactivation.

=== Decommissioning and disposal ===
On 8 July 1957, at Norfolk, she was placed in reserve. On 27 September the ship was struck from the Naval Vessel Register, and on 11 October she decommissioned and was ordered to be stripped preparatory to use to destruction as a target vessel for the Atlantic Fleet.

== Awards ==
LST-988 received one battle star for World War II service.
