= Hartmansville, West Virginia =

Hartmansville
- Unincorporated community
- Location within the state of West Virginia Hartmansville (the United States)
- Coordinates: 39°19′19″N 79°09′18″W
- Country: United States
- State: West Virginia
- County: Mineral
- Elevation: 2,697 ft (822 m)
- Time zone: UTC-5 (Eastern (EST))
  - Summer (DST): UTC-4 (EDT)
- GNIS feature ID: 1540033

Hartmansville is an unincorporated community in Mineral County, West Virginia, United States. It is part of the Cumberland, MD-WV Metropolitan Statistical Area. Hartmansville lies along the Northwestern Turnpike (U.S. Route 50) near the Grant County line.

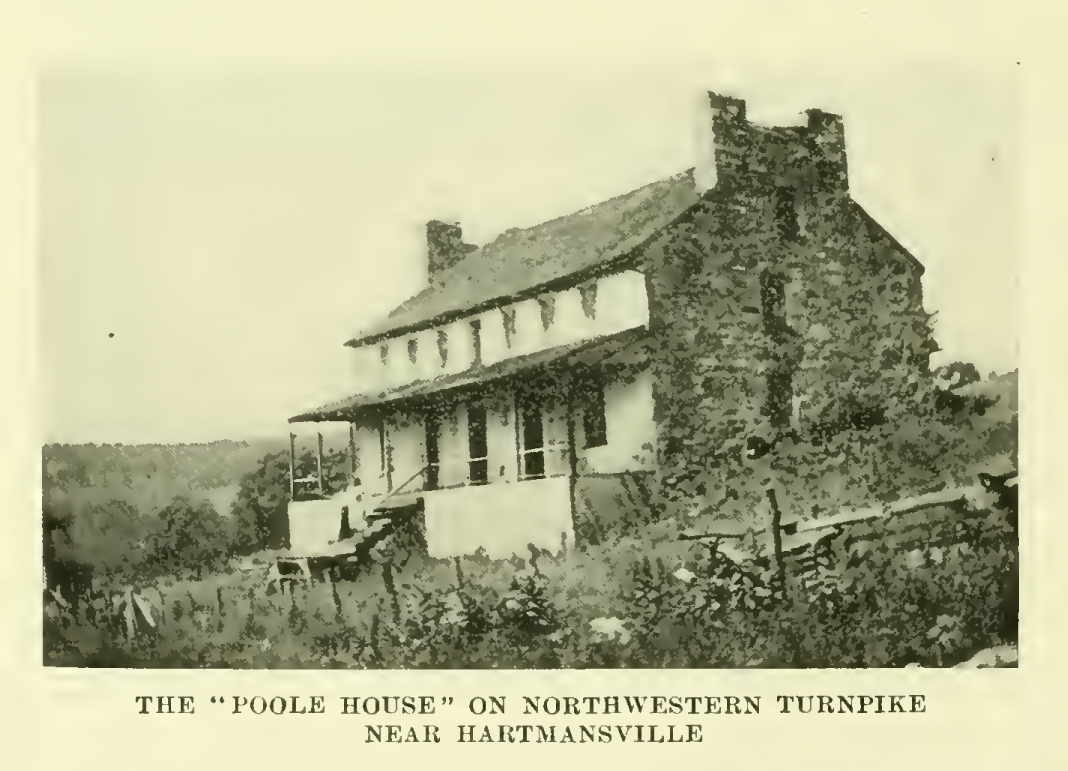
Poole House along Northwestern Turnpike near Hartmansville, WV, circa 1908

The community derives its name from Jonathan Hartman.
