= Sulphur City, West Virginia =

Sulphur City
- Unincorporated community
- Location within the state of West Virginia Sulphur City (the United States)
- Coordinates: 39°21′11″N 79°8′15″W
- Country: United States
- State: West Virginia
- County: Mineral
- Elevation: 2,530 ft (770 m)
- Time zone: UTC-5 (Eastern (EST))
  - Summer (DST): UTC-4 (EDT)
- GNIS feature ID: 1547709

Sulphur City is an unincorporated community in Mineral County, West Virginia, United States. Sulphur City is located along West Virginia Route 42.

The community was named for a sulphur spring near the original town site.
