= West Virginia Route 28 =

State highway in West Virginia, United States

West Virginia Route 28

Route information
- Maintained by WVDOH
- Length: 150.8 mi (242.7 km)

Major junctions
- South end: WV 39 in Huntersville
- WV 92 from Dunmore to Bartow; US 250 from Bartow to Thornwood; US 33 from Judy Gap to Seneca Rocks; WV 55 from Seneca Rocks to Moorefield; US 220 from Petersburg to Junction; US 50 from Junction to Romney
- North end: MD 61 / Canal Parkway at Maryland state line in Wiley Ford

Location
- Country: United States
- State: West Virginia
- Counties: Pocahontas, Pendleton, Grant, Hardy, Hampshire, Mineral

Highway system
- West Virginia State Highway System; Interstate; US; State
← WV 27	→ WV 29

West Virginia Route 28 is a north–south route through the Potomac Highlands of the U.S. state of West Virginia. The southern terminus of the route is at West Virginia Route 39 in Huntersville. The northern terminus is at the Maryland state line in Wiley Ford, where the route continues into Cumberland as Canal Parkway upon crossing the North Branch Potomac River.

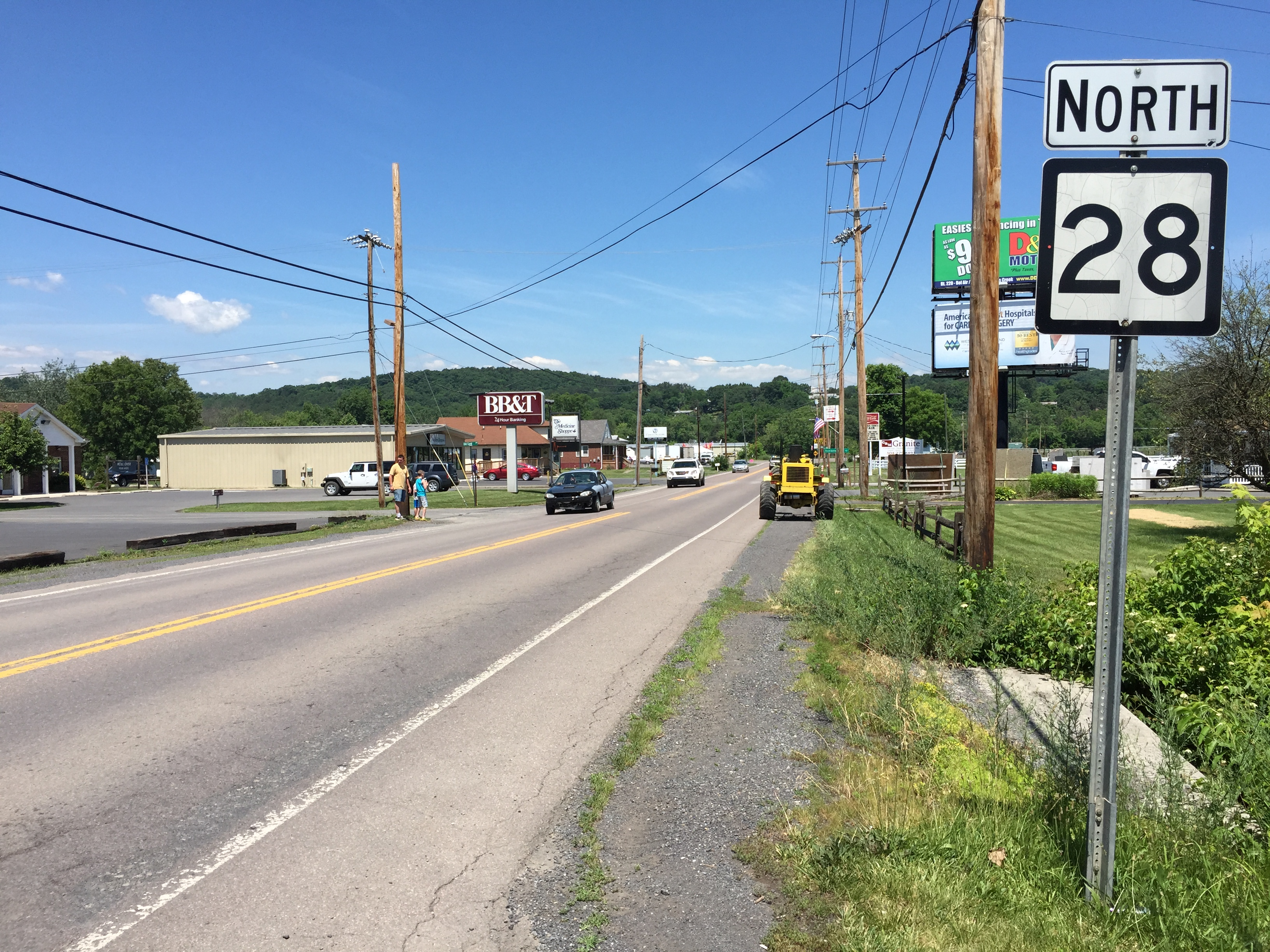
View north along WV 28 in Fort Ashby

== Attractions ==
- National Radio Astronomy Observatory
- Seneca Rocks National Recreation Area
- Fort Ashby
- Greater Cumberland Regional Airport
- Mineral County Fair
- North Fork Mountain

=== Historic sites ===
- Old Pine Church, Purgitsville
- Sloan–Parker House, Junction
- The Burg, Mechanicsburg
- Indian Mound Cemetery, Romney
- Davis History House, Romney
- Literary Hall, Romney
- Washington Place, Romney
- Wappocomo farm & Train Station, Romney
- Fort Forman site, Vance
- The Rocks, Wappocomo
- Hanging Rocks, Wappocomo
- Shouse-Martin House, Springfield
- Fort Ashby, Fort Ashby
- Fort Sellers, near Short Gap

== Major intersections ==
County	Location	mi	km	Destinations	Notes
Pocahontas				WV 39 – Warm Springs, VA, Marlinton, Watoga State Park	
Pocahontas	Dunmore			WV 92 south – White Sulphur Springs	south end of WV 92 overlap
Pocahontas				WV 66 west – Cass, Snowshoe	
Pocahontas	Bartow			US 250 north / WV 92 north – Elkins	north end of WV 92 overlap; south end of US 250 overlap
Pocahontas				US 250 south – Monterey, VA	north end of US 250 overlap
Pendleton	Judy Gap			US 33 east – Franklin	south end of US 33 overlap
Pendleton	Seneca Rocks			US 33 west / WV 55 west – Elkins	north end of US 33 overlap; south end of WV 55 overlap
Grant	Petersburg			WV 42 north – Mount Storm	
Grant	Petersburg			US 220 south – Airport	south end of US 220 overlap
Hardy				US 220 South Branch Potomac River Bridge #1	
Hardy	Moorefield			Winchester Avenue	Former route of West Virginia Route 55
Hardy	Moorefield			WV 55 east to US 48 – Baker	north end of WV 55 overlap
Hardy				US 220 South Branch Potomac River Bridge #2	
Hampshire	Junction			US 50 west / US 220 north – Keyser, Grafton	north end of US 220 overlap; south end of US 50 overlap
Hampshire	Romney			US 50 east – Winchester, VA	north end of US 50 overlap
Mineral	Fort Ashby			WV 46 west / CR 15 (Dans Run Road) – Keyser	
Mineral	Short Gap			WV 956 west	
Mineral	Wiley Ford			WV 28 Alt. north – Ridgeley	
Mineral	Wiley Ford			Canal Parkway (MD 61 north) – Cumberland	Maryland state line (Wiley Ford Bridge over North Branch Potomac River)
1.000 mi = 1.609 km; 1.000 km = 0.621 mi: Concurrency terminus

== WV 28 Alternate ==
West Virginia Route 28 Alternate
- Location: Wiley Ford
- Length: 3.0 mi (4.8 km)

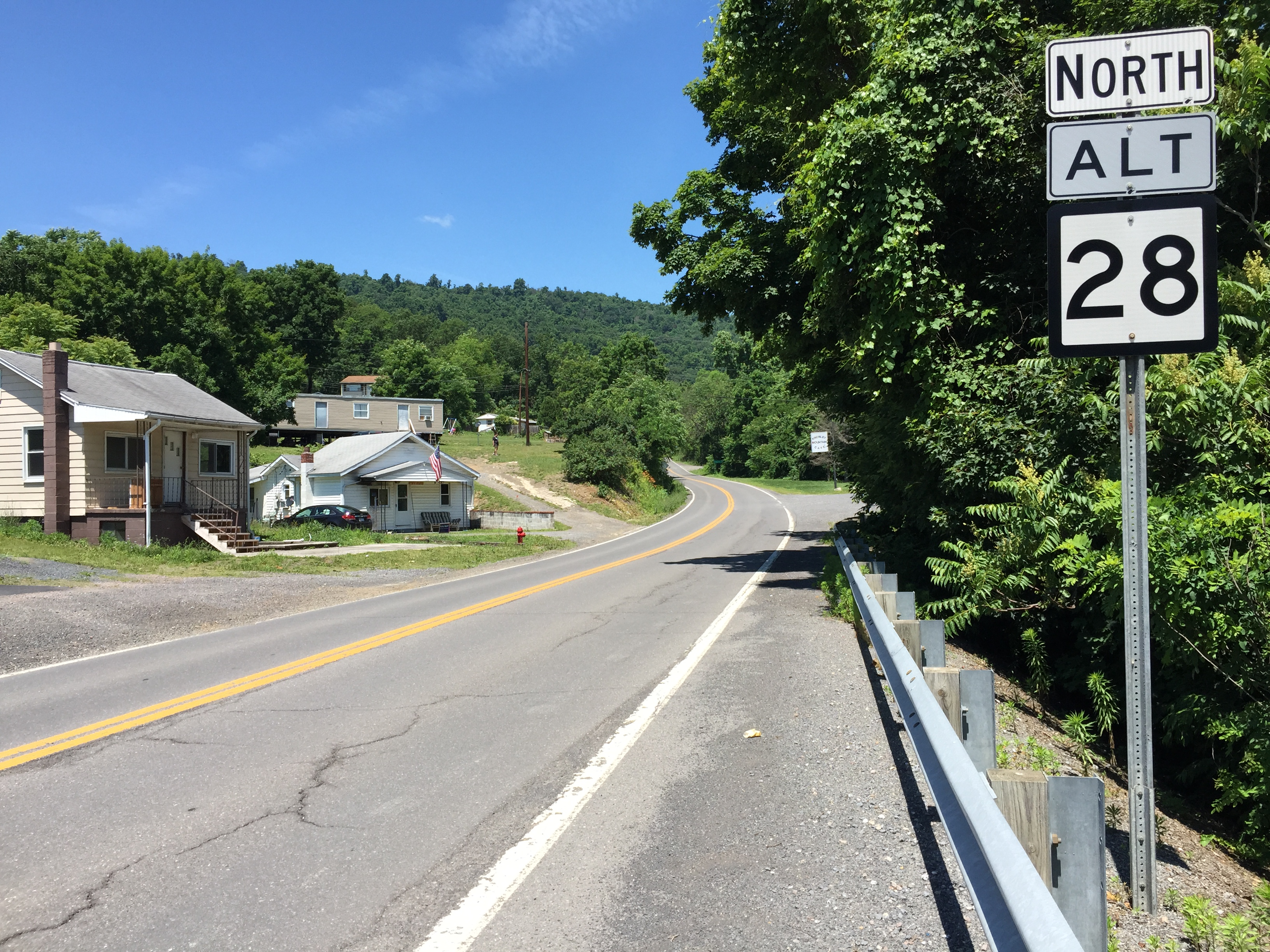
View north along WV 28 Alt. north of WV 28 in Wiley Ford

West Virginia Route 28 Alternate is a north–south alternate route of West Virginia Route 28 around Wiley Ford in northern West Virginia. The southern terminus of the route is at WV 28 in Wiley Ford. The northern terminus is at the Maryland state line in Ridgeley, where the road continues into Cumberland as MD 942 (Bridge Street) after crossing the North Branch Potomac River. The road passes by Fort Ohio in Ridgeley.

== See also ==
- Moorefield and North Branch Turnpike
