= Antioch, West Virginia =

Unincorporated community in West Virginia, United States

Antioch
- Unincorporated community
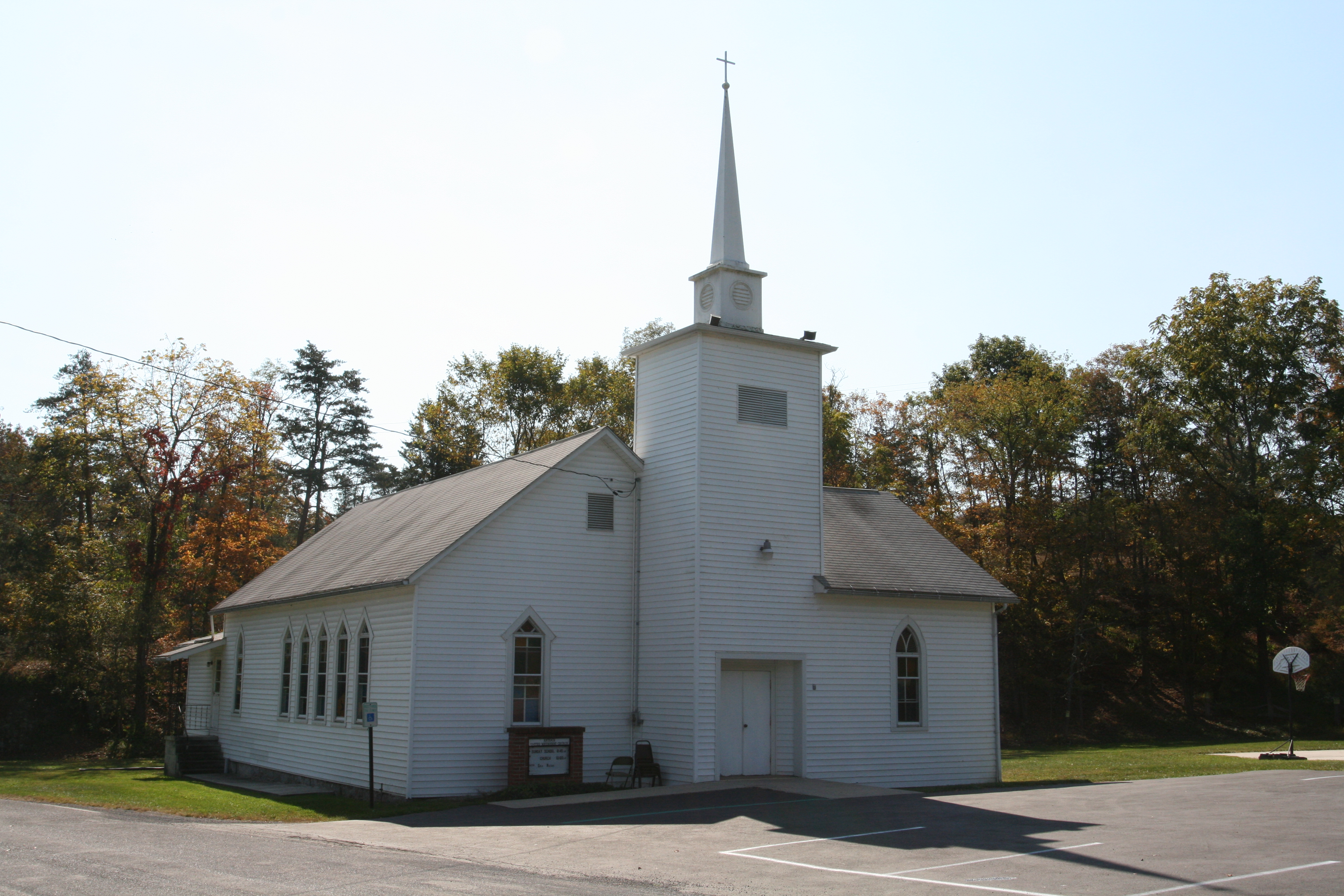
- Antioch United Methodist Church

- Location within the state of West Virginia Antioch (the United States)
- Coordinates: 39°19′25″N 79°01′03″W
- Country: United States
- State: West Virginia
- County: Mineral
- Elevation: 1,079 ft (329 m)
- Time zone: UTC-5 (Eastern (EST))
  - Summer (DST): UTC-4 (EDT)
- GNIS feature ID: 1549566

Antioch is an unincorporated community in Mineral County, West Virginia, United States. It is part of the 'Cumberland, MD-WV Metropolitan Statistical Area'. The village is located along a branch of Mill Creek where it exits Grayson Gap on the east side of Knobley Mountain. It lies at the intersection of Mikes Run Road and Knobley Road and is three miles south of U.S. Route 50.

The first European settlers arrived in the vicinity of Antioch in the last quarter of the 18th century. Samuel Barker Davis and his family were among the first to settle permanently in the village of Antioch, moving from Winchester, Virginia in 1787. Davis, a veteran of the American Revolutionary War, established a gristmill and built a log residence, both of which are still standing in Antioch today. The mill is a four-story wooden structure of mortise and tenon construction. Under the ownership of Brasher Rogers, the mill was modernized in 1880. In 1918, under the ownership of D.W. Billmyer, the mill was converted to process wool. The woolen mill continued to operate until the 1950s. Upon its closure, the machinery was sold to the Merrimack Valley Textile Museum (later the American Textile History Museum) in Lowell, Massachusetts.

Historic sites in Antioch include the Davis log cabin (1787), the woolen mill (1787), and the Antioch Methodist Church. Nearby, the site of the birthplace of Nancy Hanks Lincoln is marked by a monument.

The community takes its name from Antioch, in West Asia.
