= Wiley Ford, West Virginia =

- CDP
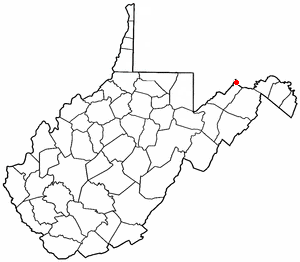
- Location of Wiley Ford, West Virginia
- Coordinates: 39°37′15″N 78°45′40″W
- Country: United States
- State: West Virginia
- County: Mineral

Area
  - Total: 2.9 sq mi (7.5 km^{2})
  - Land: 2.9 sq mi (7.5 km^{2})
  - Water: 0 sq mi (0.0 km^{2})
- Elevation: 725 ft (221 m)

Population (2020)
  - Total: 906
  - Density: 310/sq mi (120/km^{2})
- Time zone: UTC-5 (Eastern (EST))
  - Summer (DST): UTC-4 (EDT)
- ZIP code: 26767
- Area code: 304
- FIPS code: 54-87316
- GNIS feature ID: 2390515

Wiley Ford is a census-designated place (CDP) in Mineral County, West Virginia, United States and part of the 'Cumberland, MD-WV Metropolitan Statistical Area'. The population was 906 at the 2020 census (down from 1,026 at the 2010 census).

The community was named after Mr. Wiley, who settled at a nearby ford.

== Geography ==
According to the United States Census Bureau, the CDP has a total area of 2.9 square miles (7.5 km^{2}), all land.

=== Climate ===
The climate in this area is characterized by hot, humid summers and generally mild to cool winters. According to the Köppen Climate Classification system, Wiley Ford has a humid subtropical climate, abbreviated "Cfa" on climate maps.

== Demographics ==
As of the census of 2000, there were 1,095 people, 463 households, and 308 families residing in the CDP. The population density was 378.6 inhabitants per square mile (146.2/km^{2}). There were 515 housing units at an average density of 178.1 per square mile (68.8/km^{2}). The racial makeup of the CDP was 99.09% White, 0.27% Black or African American, 0.09% Native American, 0.09% Asian, and 0.46% from two or more races. There are no Pacific Islanders or people of other races. Hispanic or Latino of any race were 0.18% of the population.

There were 463 households, out of which 26.8% had children under the age of 18 living with them, 54.6% were married couples living together, 8.9% had a female householder with no husband present, and 33.3% were non-families. 28.3% of all households were made up of individuals, and 11.2% had someone living alone who was 65 years of age or older. The average household size was 2.37 and the average family size was 2.90.

In the CDP, the population was spread out, with 23.2% under the age of 18, 5.1% from 18 to 24, 27.7% from 25 to 44, 27.6% from 45 to 64, and 16.4% who were 65 years of age or older. The median age was 41 years. For every 100 females, there were 95.5 males. For every 100 females age 18 and over, there were 95.1 males.

The median income for a household in the CDP was $32,017, and the median income for a family was $37,422. Males had a median income of $31,979 versus $20,880 for females. The per capita income for the CDP was $15,380. About 5.3% of families and 10.6% of the population were below the poverty line, including 10.5% of those under age 18 and 8.6% of those age 65 or over.

== Transportation ==
- Greater Cumberland Regional Airport
