= Emoryville, West Virginia =

Unincorporated community in West Virginia, United States

Emoryville
- Unincorporated community
- Location within the state of West Virginia Emoryville (the United States)
- Coordinates: 39°21′12″N 79°10′13″W
- Country: United States
- State: West Virginia
- County: Mineral
- Elevation: 2,001 ft (610 m)
- Time zone: UTC-5 (Eastern (EST))
  - Summer (DST): UTC-4 (EDT)
- GNIS feature ID: 1538709

Emoryville is an unincorporated community and coal town in Mineral County, West Virginia, United States. It is part of the Cumberland, MD-WV Metropolitan Statistical Area. According to the Geographic Names Information System, Emoryville has also been known throughout its history as Emery, Emory, Switch Back, and Switch Back Station.

The community most likely takes its name from nearby Emory Creek.
