= Mineral County Courthouse (West Virginia) =

- U.S. National Register of Historic Places
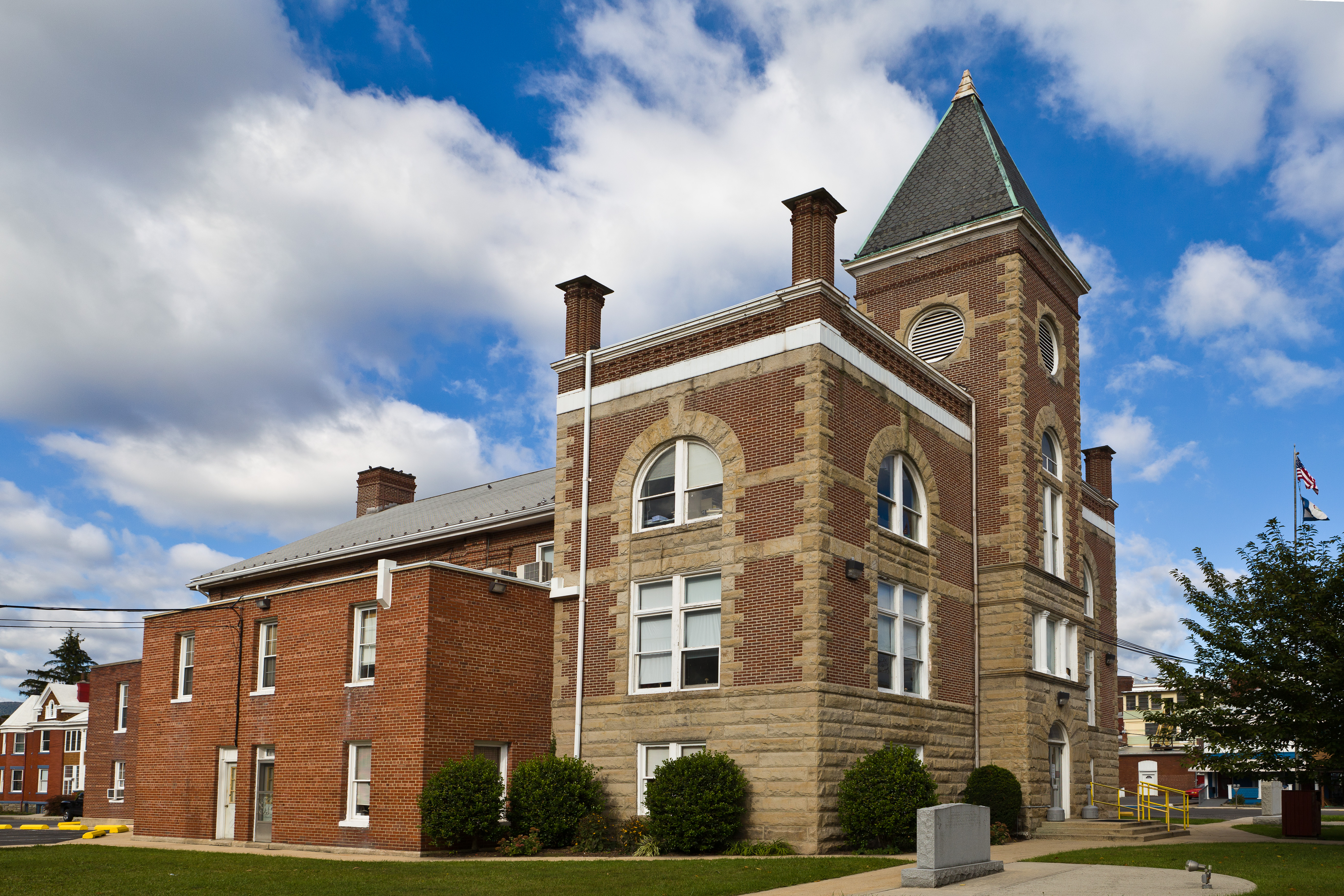
- Mineral County Courthouse, September 2012

- Location within Eastern Panhandle of West Virginia Location within West Virginia Location within the United States
- Location: 150 Armstrong St., Keyser, West Virginia
- Coordinates: 39°26′24″N 78°58′23.52″W
- Area: less than one acre
- Built: 1868
- Built by: I.B. Walton (original); E.J. Fredlock (1894 addition); J. Paul Blundon (1938&41 additions)
- Architect: C.G. Sims (original); Edward B. Franzheim, Millard F. Geisey (1894 addition); J. Paul Blundon (1938&41 additions)
- Architectural style: Romanesque Revival
- MPS: County Courthouses of West Virginia MPS
- NRHP reference No.: 05001005
- Added to NRHP: September 7, 2005

Mineral County Courthouse is a historic courthouse located at Keyser, Mineral County, West Virginia. It was built in 1868 and expanded or remodeled in 1894 and 1938–1941. The original section of the courthouse is a 2 1/2 story, brick building. The 1894 modifications are in the Romanesque Revival style. It is a three-story section constructed of brick and rusticated stone, with a low-pitched hipped roof. It features a centered tower topped with a pyramidal roof. The side and rear, two-story additions were constructed in 1938 and 1941 to provide additional county office space. U.S. Senator and vice presidential candidate Henry G. Davis donated land for the courthouse square.

It was listed on the National Register of Historic Places in 2005.
