= North Branch Potomac River =

Tributary of the Potomac River

North Branch Potomac River Tributary to Potomac River
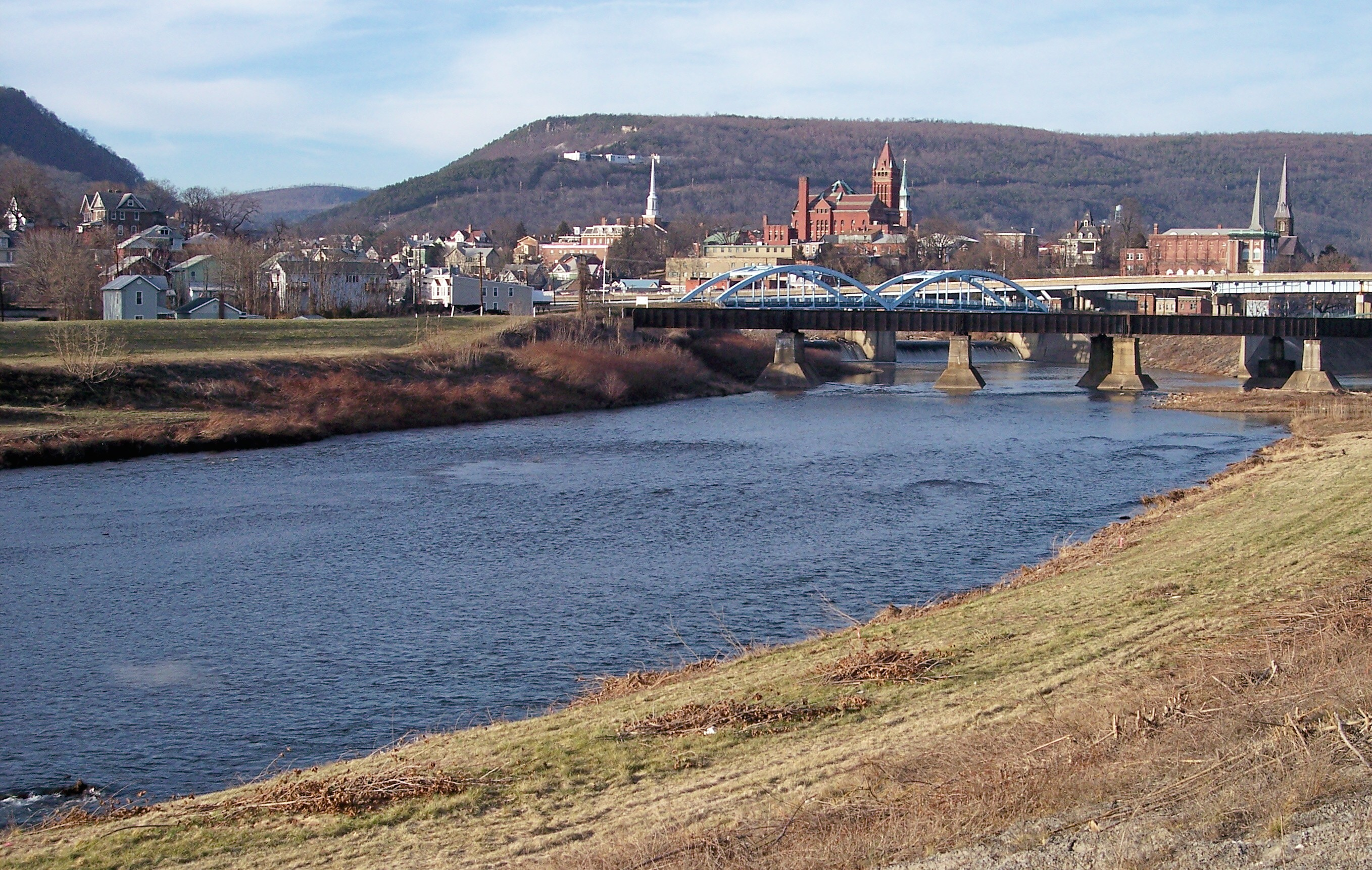
- The North Branch between Cumberland, Maryland, and Ridgeley, West Virginia in 2007

- Location of mouth

Location
- Country: United States
- State: West Virginia, Maryland
- County: Allegany (MD), Garrett (MD), Hampshire (WV), Mineral (WV), Grant (WV), Preston (WV)
- Cities (WV): Bayard, Gormania, Piedmont, Keyser
- Cities (MD): Kitzmiller, Luke, Westernport, Cumberland

Physical characteristics
- Source: Blackwater River divide
  - location: about 1 mile northwest of Fairfax, West Virginia
  - coordinates: 39°11′42.39″N 079°29′21.19″W
  - elevation: 2,960 ft (900 m)
- Mouth: Potomac River
  - location: about 1 mile east of Green Spring, West Virginia
  - coordinates: 39°31′42.33″N 078°35′15.05″W
  - elevation: 525 ft (160 m)
- Length: 101.27 mi (162.98 km)
- Basin size: 1,343.04 square miles (3,478.5 km^{2})
- Discharge
  - location: Potomac River
  - average: 5.13 cu ft/s (0.145 m^{3}/s) at mouth with Potomac River

Basin features
- Progression: Potomac River → Chesapeake Bay → Atlantic Ocean
- River system: Potomac River
- Tributaries
  - left: Laurel Run, Sand Run, Nyedegger Run, Glade Run, Steyer Run, Laurel Run, Crooked Run, Lostland Run, Short Run, Three Forks Run, Stony Hollow, Elklick Run, Folly Run, Laurel Run, Savage River, Georges Creek, Stony Run, Wildcat Hollow, Culvert Hollow, Dry Run, Deep Hollow, Warrior Run, Wills Creek, Collier Run, Mill Run, Seven Springs Run
  - right: Red Oak Creek, Buffalo Creek, Difficult Creek, Stony River, Maple Run, Abram Creek, Deep Run, Howell Run, Piney Swamp Run, Montgomery Run, Slaughterhouse Run, Powder House Run, Thunderhill Run, New Creek, Willow Run, Ashcabin Run, Koulip Hollow, Buckwheat Hollow, Patterson Creek, Dans Run, Round Bottom Hollow, Kern Hollow, Green Spring Run
- Waterbodies: Bloomington Lake
- Bridges: West Kempton Road (x2), Corona Bayard Road, Kitzmiller Road, Masteller Road, WV 46, US 220, Black Oak Road, WV 956, WV 28 Alt, Canal Parkway, Green Spring Road

The North Branch Potomac River flows from Fairfax Stone in West Virginia to its confluence with the South Branch Potomac River near Green Spring, West Virginia, where it turns into the Potomac River proper.

== Course ==
From the Fairfax Stone, the North Branch Potomac River flows 27 miles (43 km) to the man-made Jennings Randolph Lake, an impoundment designed for flood control and emergency water supply. Below the dam, the North Branch cuts a serpentine path through the eastern Allegheny Mountains. First, it flows northeast by the communities of Bloomington, Luke, and Westernport in Maryland and then on by Keyser, West Virginia to Cumberland, Maryland. At Cumberland, the river turns southeast. 103 miles (166 km) downstream from its source, the North Branch is joined by the South Branch between Green Spring and South Branch Depot, West Virginia from whence it flows past Hancock, Maryland and turns southeast once more on its way toward Washington, D.C., and the Chesapeake Bay.

== Water quality ==
Historically, the North Branch had highly acidic water due to waste from coal mining and paper production in the region. In 1969, one measuring station recorded a pH of 2.3, comparable to lemon juice. This regularly killed wildlife across a 60–80 km (40–50 mi) span. It was somewhat mitigated by the construction of the Bloomington Dam, which allowed for flow control based on density. The dam was constructed in 1981; by 1987, the pH had returned to the neutral range in some areas, but dissolved aluminum and manganese concentrations were still at toxic levels, which continued to impede full wildlife recovery. In 1990, Maryland installed lime dosers, devices which dispense alkaline lime into the river, to further mitigate acidity in problem spots. This was successful, and today fish can survive in the river again.

== Tributaries ==
- Stony River (West Virginia)
- Abram Creek (West Virginia)
- Savage River (Maryland)
- Georges Creek (Maryland)
  - Laurel Run (Maryland)
- New Creek (West Virginia)
- Limestone Run (West Virginia)
- Warrior Run (Maryland)
- Wills Creek (Pennsylvania/Maryland)
  - Brush Creek (Pennsylvania)
  - Little Wills Creek (Pennsylvania)
- Evitts Creek (Maryland and Pennsylvania)
- Patterson Creek (West Virginia)
  - Mill Creek (West Virginia)
- Dans Run (West Virginia)
- Green Spring Run (West Virginia)
