= Knobly Mountain =

Mountain in the U.S. state of West Virginia

Highest point
- Elevation: 1,808 ft (551 m)
- Coordinates: 39°20′49″N 79°00′40″W

Geography
- Location: Grant / Mineral counties, West Virginia, U.S.
- Parent range: Ridge-and-Valley Appalachians
- Topo map: USGS Antioch

Knobly Mountain is a ridge and part of the Ridge-and-Valley Appalachians, located east of New Creek Mountain in Mineral and Grant counties, West Virginia, in the United States.

The summit was so named on account of its uneven outline.
