= Mineral County, West Virginia =

County in West Virginia, United States

- County
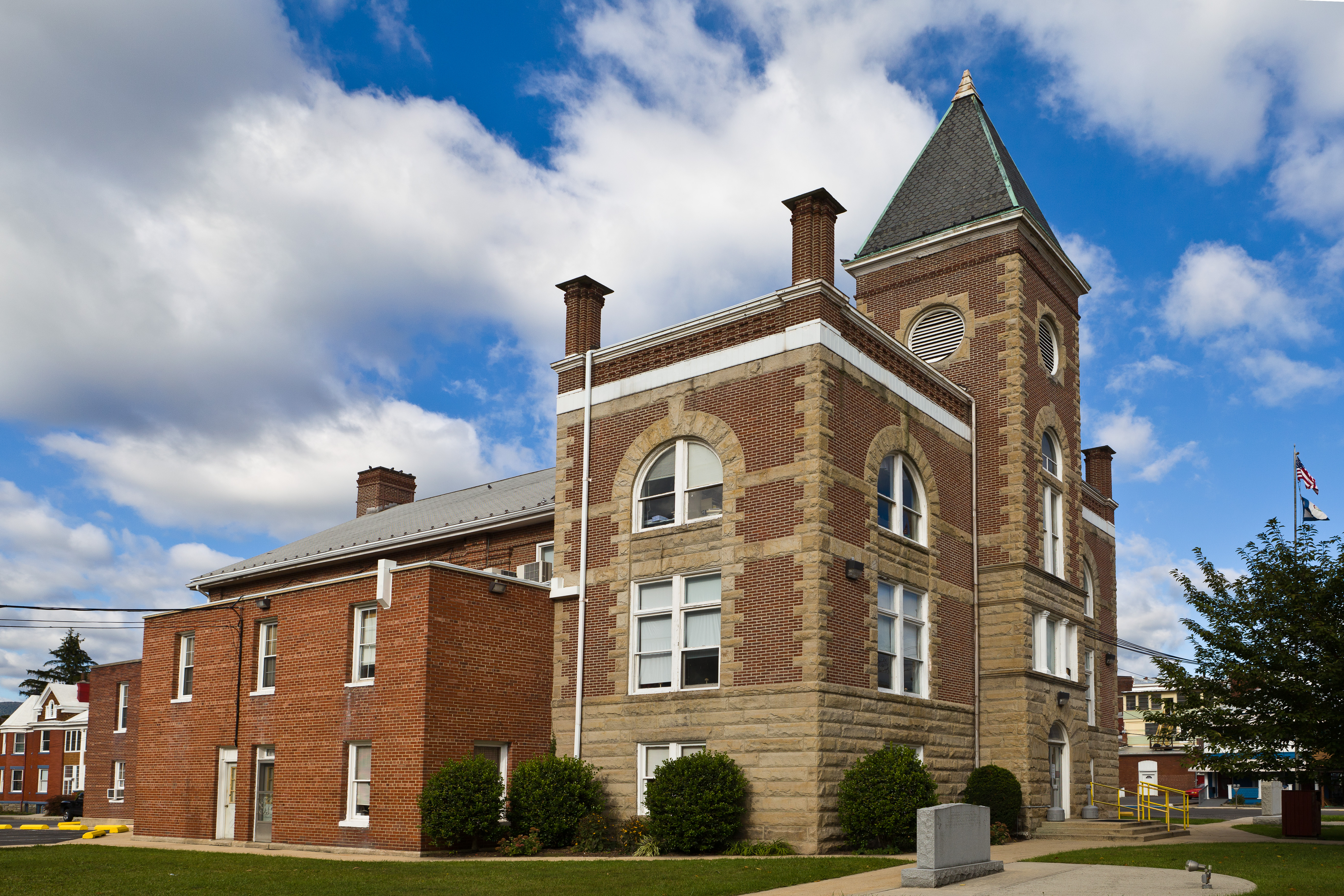
- Mineral County Courthouse in Keyser

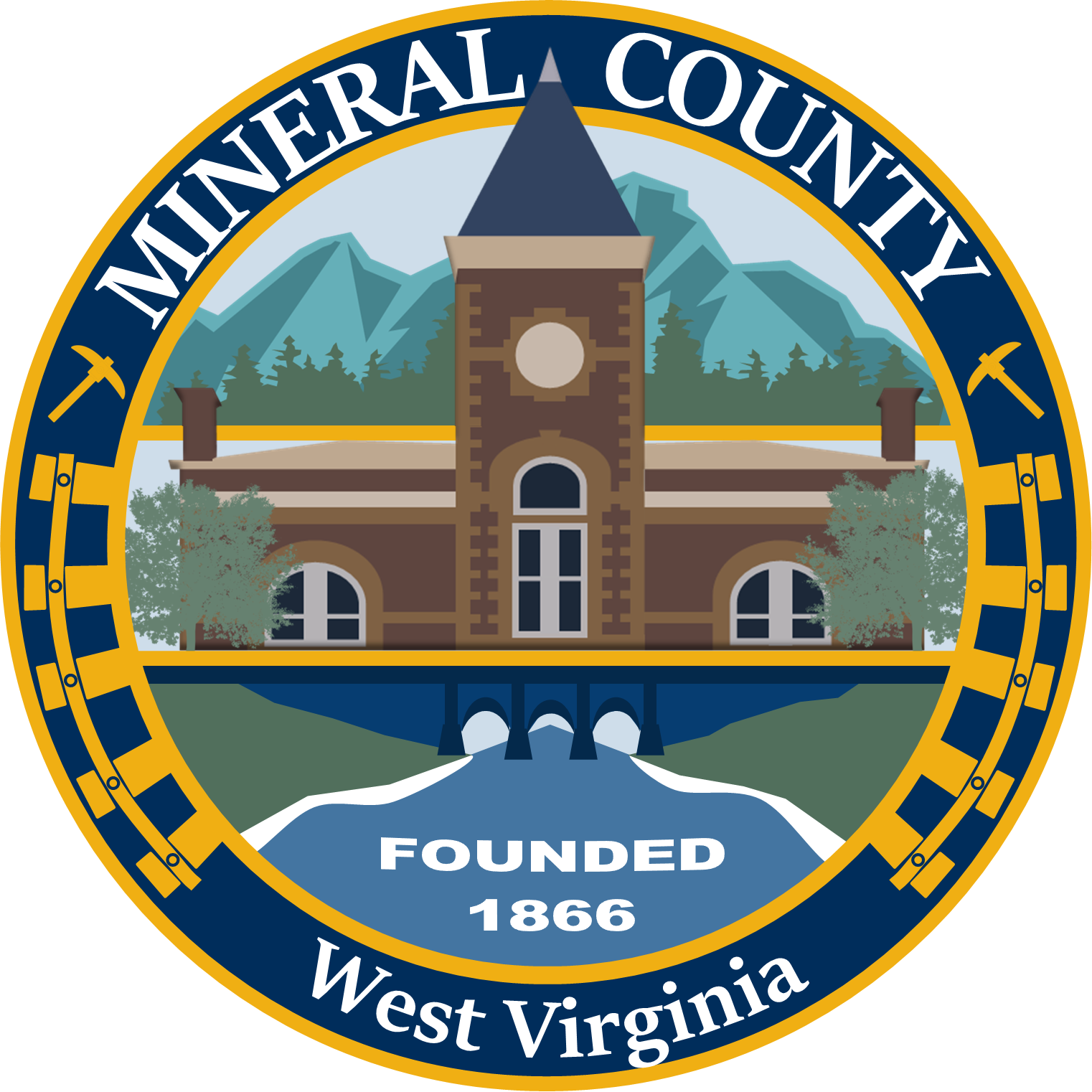
- Seal

- Location within the U.S. state of West Virginia
- Coordinates: 39°25′N 78°56′W
- Country: United States
- State: West Virginia
- Founded: February 1, 1866
- Seat: Keyser
- Largest city: Keyser

Area
  - Total: 329 sq mi (850 km^{2})
  - Land: 328 sq mi (850 km^{2})
  - Water: 1.4 sq mi (3.6 km^{2}) 0.4%

Population (2020)
  - Total: 26,938
  - Estimate (2025): 26,792 ▼
  - Density: 82.1/sq mi (31.7/km^{2})
- Time zone: UTC−5 (Eastern)
  - Summer (DST): UTC−4 (EDT)
- Congressional district: 1st
- Website: www.mineralwv.gov

Mineral County is a county in the U.S. state of West Virginia. It is part of the Cumberland metropolitan area, together with Cumberland, Maryland. As of the 2020 census, the population was 26,938. Its county seat is Keyser. The county was founded in 1866.

== History ==
=== Ancient history ===
Indigenous peoples lived throughout the highlands along rivers in this area for thousands of years. Archeologists have identified artifacts of the Adena culture, dating from 1000 BC to 200 BC. They were among the several early Native American cultures who built major earthwork mounds for ceremonial and burial use. Remnants of their culture have been found throughout West Virginia. They were followed by other indigenous peoples.

With the growth of fur trading to the north after European encounter in the coastal areas, the nations of the Haudenosaunee (or Iroquois Confederacy), based in present-day New York, moved into the Ohio Valley in search of new hunting grounds. By the 17th century they had conquered other tribes, pushed them out to the west, and preserved the area for hunting.

=== 1863 to present ===
It was not until after West Virginia became a state in 1863 that present-day Mineral County was organized. It was created in 1866 by an Act of the West Virginia Legislature from the existing Hampshire County. The name was selected due to its reserves of minerals, especially coal - although coal, a type of sedimentary rock, is not a mineral because it does not have a crystalline structure.

The seminal point in the creation of the county was the arrival of the main line of the Baltimore and Ohio Railroad in 1842. The county seat of Keyser was named for an executive of the railroad.

In 1863, West Virginia's counties were divided into civil townships, with the intention of encouraging local government. This proved impractical in the heavily rural state, and in 1872 the townships were converted into magisterial districts. After its formation in 1866, Mineral County was divided into seven townships: Cabin Run, Elk, (Note: Also called "Elk Garden" in early records.) Frankfort, Mill Creek, New Creek, Piedmont, and Welton. Mill Creek Township was returned to Hampshire County in 1871, and in 1872 the six remaining townships became magisterial districts. Except for minor adjustments, they remained relatively unchanged until the 1980s, when they were consolidated into three new districts: District 1, District 2, and District 3.

== Geography ==
According to the United States Census Bureau, the county has a total area of 329 square miles (850 km^{2}), of which 328 square miles (850 km^{2}) is land and 1.4 square miles (3.6 km^{2}) (0.4%) is water.

=== Mountains ===
The Allegheny Front in West Virginia lies in Mineral County and includes the highest point in the county. Known as "the Pinnacle", it is 3,104 feet (946 m) above sea level. From the abandoned fire tower four states are visible, Pennsylvania, Maryland, West Virginia, and Virginia. The Allegheny Front is the largest mountain in the county; on the north end it is also known as Green Mountain. Prior to 1830, the only medical aid available to the settlers was common sense, home remedies and liberal dosages of prayer. The first resident physician in what is now Mineral County was Dr. John Green, who was born in Bolton, England, in 1799, and immigrated to America in 1828. He lived on a farm, which he called Iceland, located near the ridge of the escarpment about three miles from Sulphur City. The area was later named for his son, Tom Green, and is known as Green Mountain. On top of the Allegheny Plateau is located the town of Sulphur City and Elk Garden, West Virginia in the southwestern portion of the county. The Potomac River Valley lies to west and north of the mountain, and the New Creek Valley lies to the east.

Knobly Mountain lies between the New Creek and Patterson Creek valleys. It is the longest mountain in Mineral County stretching from the Grant County line in the south to the Potomac River in the north at Ridgeley, West Virginia.

To the east of the Patterson Creek Valley lie a series of low hills which form the eastern border of the county with Hampshire County.

=== Rivers ===
- North Branch Potomac River is the largest river, though not actually in the county. It forms the northern border of the county and the state border with actual border being the low water mark on the south side. Jennings Randolph Lake is located on this stream.
- New Creek enters the North Branch Potomac River at Keyser with the headwaters starting at Dam Site 14 in Grant County, West Virginia. It is the water supply for the city of Keyser.
- Patterson Creek enters the Potomac River east of Cumberland, Maryland, with headwaters being in Grant County, West Virginia. The Patterson Creek watershed contains two-thirds of Mineral County.

=== Minerals ===
Natural gas is found east of the Allegheny Front as well as iron ore deposits. The county no longer produces iron, but several abandoned iron furnaces from the 19th century still exist.

== Demographics ==
Historical population
Census	Pop.	Note	%±
1870	6,332		—
1880	8,630		36.3%
1890	12,085		40.0%
1900	12,883		6.6%
1910	16,674		29.4%
1920	19,849		19.0%
1930	20,084		1.2%
1940	22,215		10.6%
1950	22,333		0.5%
1960	22,354		0.1%
1970	23,109		3.4%
1980	27,234		17.9%
1990	26,697		−2.0%
2000	27,078		1.4%
2010	28,212		4.2%
2020	26,938		−4.5%
2025 (est.)	26,792	▼	−0.5%
U.S. Decennial Census; 1790–1960 1900–1990; 1990–2000 2010–2020

=== 2020 census ===
As of the 2020 census, the county had a population of 26,938. Of the residents, 20.4% were under the age of 18 and 22.1% were 65 years of age or older; the median age was 44.5 years. For every 100 females there were 97.4 males, and for every 100 females age 18 and over there were 96.3 males.

The racial makeup of the county was 91.8% White, 2.7% Black or African American, 0.2% American Indian and Alaska Native, 0.4% Asian, 0.4% from some other race, and 4.5% from two or more races. Hispanic or Latino residents of any race comprised 1.1% of the population.

There were 11,114 households in the county, of which 27.4% had children under the age of 18 living with them and 25.0% had a female householder with no spouse or partner present. About 28.1% of all households were made up of individuals and 14.3% had someone living alone who was 65 years of age or older. The average household and family size was 3.19.

There were 12,453 housing units, of which 10.8% were vacant. Among occupied housing units, 77.9% were owner-occupied and 22.1% were renter-occupied. The homeowner vacancy rate was 1.6% and the rental vacancy rate was 11.2%.

Mineral County, West Virginia – Racial and ethnic composition Note: the US Census treats Hispanic/Latino as an ethnic category. This table excludes Latinos from the racial categories and assigns them to a separate category. Hispanics/Latinos may be of any race.
Race / Ethnicity (NH = Non-Hispanic)	Pop 2000	Pop 2010	Pop 2020	% 2000	% 2010	% 2020
White alone (NH)	25,924	26,742	24,603	95.74%	94.79%	91.33%
Black or African American alone (NH)	689	769	711	2.54%	2.73%	2.64%
Native American or Alaska Native alone (NH)	30	34	36	0.11%	0.12%	0.13%
Asian alone (NH)	51	110	113	0.19%	0.39%	0.42%
Pacific Islander alone (NH)	2	1	5	0.01%	0.00%	0.02%
Other race alone (NH)	23	16	50	0.08%	0.06%	0.19%
Mixed race or Multiracial (NH)	201	338	1,111	0.74%	1.20%	4.12%
Hispanic or Latino (any race)	158	202	309	0.58%	0.72%	1.15%
Total	27,078	28,212	26,938	100.00%	100.00%	100.00%

=== 2020 income and poverty estimates ===
The median income for a household was $57,345 and the poverty rate was 12.1%.

=== 2010 census ===
At the 2010 census, there were 28,212 people, 11,550 households, and 7,879 families residing in the county. The population density was 86.1 inhabitants per square mile (33.2/km^{2}). There were 13,039 housing units at an average density of 39.8 units per square mile (15.4 units/km^{2}). The racial makeup of the county was 95.3% white, 2.8% black or African American, 0.4% Asian, 0.1% American Indian, 0.1% from other races, and 1.2% from two or more races. Those of Hispanic or Latino origin made up 0.7% of the population. In terms of ancestry, 32.9% were German, 16.0% were Irish, 11.3% were English, and 10.0% were American.

Of the 11,550 households, 28.5% had children under the age of 18 living with them, 53.5% were married couples living together, 10.0% had a female householder with no husband present, 31.8% were non-families, and 27.0% of all households were made up of individuals. The average household size was 2.39 and the average family size was 2.87. The median age was 42.3 years.

The median income for a household in the county was $36,571 and the median income for a family was $46,820. Males had a median income of $44,068 versus $25,675 for females. The per capita income for the county was $20,805. About 11.7% of families and 16.1% of the population were below the poverty line, including 25.2% of those under age 18 and 12.7% of those age 65 or over.

=== 2000 census ===
At the 2000 census, there were 27,078 people, 10,784 households, and 7,710 families residing in the county. The population density was 83 people per square mile (32 people/km^{2}). There were 12,094 housing units at an average density of 37 units per square mile (14 units/km^{2}). The racial makeup of the county was 96.16% White, 2.55% Black or African American, 0.11% Native American, 0.20% Asian, 0.01% Pacific Islander, 0.21% from other races, and 0.76% from two or more races. 0.58% of the population were Hispanic or Latino of any race.

There were 10,784 households, out of which 30.40% had children under the age of 18 living with them, 57.90% were married couples living together, 9.70% had a female householder with no husband present, and 28.50% were non-families. 25.00% of all households were made up of individuals, and 11.50% had someone living alone who was 65 years of age or older. The average household size was 2.46 and the average family size was 2.93.

In the county, the population was spread out, with 23.40% under the age of 18, 8.60% from 18 to 24, 27.10% from 25 to 44, 25.90% from 45 to 64, and 15.10% who were 65 years of age or older. The median age was 39 years. For every 100 females there were 95.80 males. For every 100 females age 18 and over, there were 93.00 males.

The median income for a household in the county was $31,149, and the median income for a family was $37,866. Males had a median income of $32,337 versus $20,090 for females. The per capita income for the county was $15,384. About 11.50% of families and 14.70% of the population were below the poverty line, including 21.10% of those under age 18 and 11.60% of those age 65 or over.

== Politics ==
After having leaned strongly towards the Democratic Party between the New Deal and Bill Clinton's presidency, most of West Virginia has, since 2000, seen a swing towards the Republican Party due to declining unionization and differences with the Democratic Party's liberal views on social issues. Mineral County, in contrast, was formed from the Unionist portion of Hampshire County following the Civil War and has always leaned Republican, although it has never been nearly so rock-ribbed as analogously created Grant County. Nonetheless, Mineral County would not vote Democratic between 1888 and 1932 inclusive – although voting for Theodore Roosevelt in 1912 – and the last Democrat to carry the county was Jimmy Carter in 1976.

United States presidential election results for Mineral County, West Virginia
Year	Republican		Democratic		Third party(ies)	
Year	No.	%	No.	%	No.	%
1868	363	56.45%	280	43.55%	0	0.00%
1872	528	55.35%	426	44.65%	0	0.00%
1876	697	41.79%	971	58.21%	0	0.00%
1880	772	44.37%	922	52.99%	46	2.64%
1884	985	47.77%	1,077	52.23%	0	0.00%
1888	1,251	50.04%	1,209	48.36%	40	1.60%
1892	1,356	49.69%	1,279	46.87%	94	3.44%
1896	1,547	53.27%	1,307	45.01%	50	1.72%
1900	1,661	56.40%	1,241	42.14%	43	1.46%
1904	1,802	54.96%	1,397	42.60%	80	2.44%
1908	1,986	55.46%	1,512	42.22%	83	2.32%
1912	513	14.69%	1,367	39.16%	1,611	46.15%
1916	1,965	51.83%	1,747	46.08%	79	2.08%
1920	3,646	57.90%	2,516	39.96%	135	2.14%
1924	3,551	49.62%	2,860	39.96%	746	10.42%
1928	5,860	71.36%	2,310	28.13%	42	0.51%
1932	4,519	50.95%	4,098	46.21%	252	2.84%
1936	4,486	45.50%	5,333	54.09%	40	0.41%
1940	5,133	49.70%	5,195	50.30%	0	0.00%
1944	4,635	53.75%	3,989	46.25%	0	0.00%
1948	4,382	48.71%	4,586	50.98%	28	0.31%
1952	5,598	55.19%	4,545	44.81%	0	0.00%
1956	6,412	64.12%	3,588	35.88%	0	0.00%
1960	6,299	60.20%	4,164	39.80%	0	0.00%
1964	3,801	37.47%	6,344	62.53%	0	0.00%
1968	4,545	45.26%	4,225	42.07%	1,273	12.68%
1972	7,157	68.60%	3,276	31.40%	0	0.00%
1976	5,130	46.52%	5,898	53.48%	0	0.00%
1980	6,125	54.33%	4,671	41.43%	478	4.24%
1984	7,291	65.46%	3,832	34.40%	15	0.13%
1988	6,015	59.49%	4,059	40.14%	37	0.37%
1992	4,837	45.09%	3,992	37.21%	1,899	17.70%
1996	4,380	48.26%	3,487	38.42%	1,209	13.32%
2000	6,180	63.18%	3,341	34.15%	261	2.67%
2004	7,854	68.53%	3,518	30.70%	89	0.78%
2008	7,616	65.96%	3,750	32.48%	181	1.57%
2012	7,833	71.29%	2,885	26.26%	270	2.46%
2016	9,070	77.71%	2,050	17.56%	551	4.72%
2020	10,040	77.97%	2,660	20.66%	176	1.37%
2024	10,247	79.41%	2,483	19.24%	174	1.35%

== Government ==
=== County Commission ===
Mineral County is governed by a three-member commission, one member to be elected every two years to a six-year term of office. The County Commission, as the governing body, is responsible for the fiscal affairs and general administration of county government. The County Commission does not possess home rule per Article 6, Section 39a of the Constitution of West Virginia.

==== Commissioners ====
- Jerry Whisner, Republican Commission President
- Roger Leatherman, Republican: term ending 2020
- Charles "Dutch" Staggs

==== Appointed commissions ====
- The Mineral County Planning Commission is charged with administering Mineral County's land use ordinances. It operates under section §8A-2-1 of the West Virginia state code. Its subdivisions include Industrial Park Construction, Storm Water Management, and Flood Plain Management. Members are appointed to the planning commission, by the county commission, for 3 year terms.
- The Mineral County Development Authority administers industrial parks and seeks to bring new business to the county.

=== Office of Assessor ===
- Assessor: Jill Cosner, Republican.

==== Circuit Clerk ====
•Krista Dixon

=== County Clerk ===
The Clerk is elected to a six-year term with the right to succeed himself/herself. The primary duties and responsibilities of the Clerk of the County Commission may be identified as two basic functions:

1. to act as clerk (fiscal officer, secretary) of the County Commission, and
2. to act as the receiver of fees charged for the instruments to be filed and recorded within the county. The official books and papers of the Office of the Clerk of the County Commission are considered permanent public records.

The County Commissions through their clerks shall have the custody of all deeds and other papers presented for record in their counties and they shall be preserved therein. They shall have jurisdiction in all matters of probate, the appointment and qualification of personal representatives, guardians, committees, curators and the settlement of their accounts. The Clerk shall have custody of all election records, payroll and budgetary accounting, and accounts payable.

County Clerk: Lauren Ellifritz, Republican

=== Sheriff-Tax Office ===
==== Sheriff ====
- Joel Whisner

===== Chief Tax Deputy =====
- Chris Spurling

=== State representatives ===
==== House of Delegates ====
District	Representative	Party	County/Counties
87	Gary G. Howell	Republican	Mineral (part)
88	Rick Hillenbrand	Republican	Mineral (part), Hampshire (part)

==== Senate ====
District	Senator	Party	County/Counties
14	Jay Taylor	Republican	Barbour, Grant (part), Mineral, (part); Monongalia (part), Preston, Hardy, Taylor, Tucker
14	Randy Smith	Republican	Barbour, Grant (part), Mineral, (part); Monongalia (part), Preston, Hardy, Taylor, Tucker
15	Craig Blair	Republican	Berkeley (part), Hampshire, Mineral, (part); Morgan
15	Charles Trump	Republican	Berkeley (part), Hampshire, Mineral, (part); Morgan

== Economy ==
=== Industrial parks ===
The Mineral County Development Authority operates industrial parks near Keyser, featuring rail access, and near Fort Ashby, with fiber optics and sitewide wireless Internet Keyser Industrial Park Fort Ashby Business and Technology Park

== Education ==
The school district for Mineral County is Mineral County Schools.

=== High schools ===
Mineral County Schools includes two high schools: Frankfort High School located near Short Gap and Keyser High School located south of Keyser.

=== Colleges ===
Potomac State College, a two-year school, is located in the county seat of Keyser, West Virginia on the site of Civil War Fort Fuller.

== Transportation ==
=== Airport ===
The Greater Cumberland Regional Airport is located in Wiley Ford.

=== Public transportation ===
The Potomac Valley Transit Authority provides deviated fixed route and demand response public transportation services to residents.

=== Rail ===
CSX lines run along the Potomac River on the northern border of the county. Amtrak service is available in Cumberland, Maryland, just across from Ridgeley, West Virginia. Keyser's railroad station closed in the 1980s.

=== Major highways ===
- U.S. Route 50
- U.S. Route 220
- West Virginia Route 28
- West Virginia Route 42

- West Virginia Route 46
- West Virginia Route 93
- West Virginia Route 956

== Parks and public recreational attractions ==
=== Larenim Park ===
Owned by Mineral County, the park size is 365 acres (1.48 km^{2}). Includes two pavilions with 10 tables, an amphitheater with seating capacity of 600. One Little League field and one softball field. Fishing Areas; two flood control dams stocked by WVDNR, 5 and 2.5 acres (20,000 and 10,000 m^{2}). All 365 acres (1.48 km^{2}) are open to public hunting by permit. Approximately 5 miles of trails. An arboretum is under construction at Larenim to include a Shale Barrens Conservancy. Larenim Park is also home to the local theater group, McNeill's Rangers.

=== Barnum Whitewater Area ===
Owned by Mineral County with size of approximately 40 acres (160,000 m^{2}). Includes four miles (6.4 km) of rail/trail. This area has approximately 1-mile (1.6 km) of river frontage on the North Branch of the Potomac River below Jennings Randolph Lake, along the old Western Maryland Railway right-of-way. It is one of the best trout streams in West Virginia and also provides seven miles (11 km) of whitewater rafting and canoeing for the entire family to enjoy. Public hunting permitted on surrounding state lands.

=== MINCO Park ===
Owned by Mineral County Schools, MINCO Park's size is 13.5 acres (55,000 m^{2}). Its facilities include two pavilions with 50 picnic tables, nine cabins, a dining field, a chapel, meeting room, and bath/shower facilities.

=== Van Myra Campground ===
Owned by the State of West Virginia and leased by Mineral County, the campground area is 10 acres (40,000 m^{2}). Three picnic tables, four mini-pavilions, and picnic area only comprise this facility.

=== Dam Site #21 ===
Owned by Mineral County, 178 acres (0.72 km^{2}), with no facilities. Fishing 10 acres (40,000 m^{2}) flood control dam.

=== Jennings Randolph Lake ===
Jennings Randolph Lake, named for Senator Jennings Randolph. The lake was originally named Bloomington Lake. The lake was constructed in 1981 on top of the town of Shaw, West Virginia by the United States Army Corps of Engineers. The lake is located near Elk Garden. The lake offers extensive recreational opportunity with its 952 acres (3.85 km^{2}) and more than 13 miles (21 km) of shoreline. Howell Run Picnic Area overlooks the lake and contains 40 picnic sites, two pavilions, a playground and vault toilets. The Howell Run Boat Launch consists of a two lane concrete ramp. the Robert W. Craig Campground is situated on a high ridge overlooking the dam site and features 87 campsites, potable water, hot showers, vault toilets and a playground. A 3/4 mile long interpretive trail has been developed in the area. The West Virginia Overlook area contains a two tier Visitor Center. Waffle Rock, a unique natural rock formation, can also be viewed from the Overlook.

=== Golf courses ===
- Polish Pines – Privately owned, nine holes, Club House
- Mill Creek – Privately owned, nine holes, Club House

=== Libraries ===
Mineral County is home to the Keyser-Mineral County public library. It was a product of the Works Progress Administration and opened in 1937. In 1962 in moved to a larger location, in the building formerly occupied by the Farmers and Merchants bank. The library is funded by the West Virginia Library Commission, Mineral County Court, and Keyser City Council. In addition to the main branch in Keyser, the library also has branches in Burlington and Fort Ashby.

There is also the Piedmont Public Library that is a County United Way agency. The library is funded by County United Way and West Virginia Library Commission.

== Communities ==
=== City ===
- Keyser (county seat)

=== Towns ===
- Piedmont
- Ridgeley
- Carpendale
- Elk Garden

=== Magisterial districts ===
- District 1
- District 2
- District 3

=== Census-designated places ===
- Burlington
- Fort Ashby
- Wiley Ford

=== Unincorporated communities ===
- Antioch
- Atlantic Hill
- Barnum
- Beryl
- Blaine
- Champwood
- Claysville
- Cross
- Dans Run
- Emoryville
- Foote Station
- Forge Hill
- Fountain
- Hampshire
- Hartmansville
- Headsville
- Keymont
- Lakewood, Ridgeley
- Laurel Dale
- Limestone
- Markwood
- Nethkin
- New Creek
- Oakmont
- Patterson Creek
- Reeses Mill
- Ridgeville
- Rocket Center
- Russelldale
- Short Gap
- Skyline
- Sulphur City
- Wagoner

== Historical sites ==
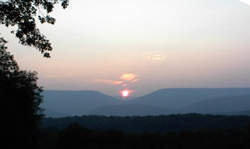
Saddle Mountain as viewed from Highland Acres Farm

- Carskadon Mansion
- Claysville Church
- Claysville Log House
- Fort Ashby
- Fort Cocke
- Fort Fuller
- Fort Ohio
- Fort Sellers
- Mineral County Courthouse (West Virginia)
- Nancy Hanks Birthplace
- New Creek Blockhouse
- Northwestern Turnpike
- Patterson Creek Manor
- Saddle Mountain
- Traveler's Rest
- Weaver's Antique Service Station
- Wind Lea

== Notable people ==
- Colonel James Allen
- John Ashby
- Woodrow Wilson Barr
- Thomas Carskadon
- Henry G. Davis
- Thomas Beall Davis
- Lynndie England
- Henry Louis Gates
- Nancy Hanks Lincoln, mother of Abraham Lincoln
- Jonah Edward Kelley
- John Kruk
- Leo Mazzone
- Catherine Marshall
- Walter E. "Jack" Rollins
- Harley Orrin Staggers
- Harley O. Staggers Jr.
- Ken Ward Jr.
- Steve Whiteman

== See also ==
- Allegheny Wildlife Management Area
- Mineral Daily News-Tribune - local newspaper
- National Register of Historic Places listings in Mineral County, West Virginia
- USS Mineral County (LST-988)
