= Elk Garden, West Virginia =

- Town
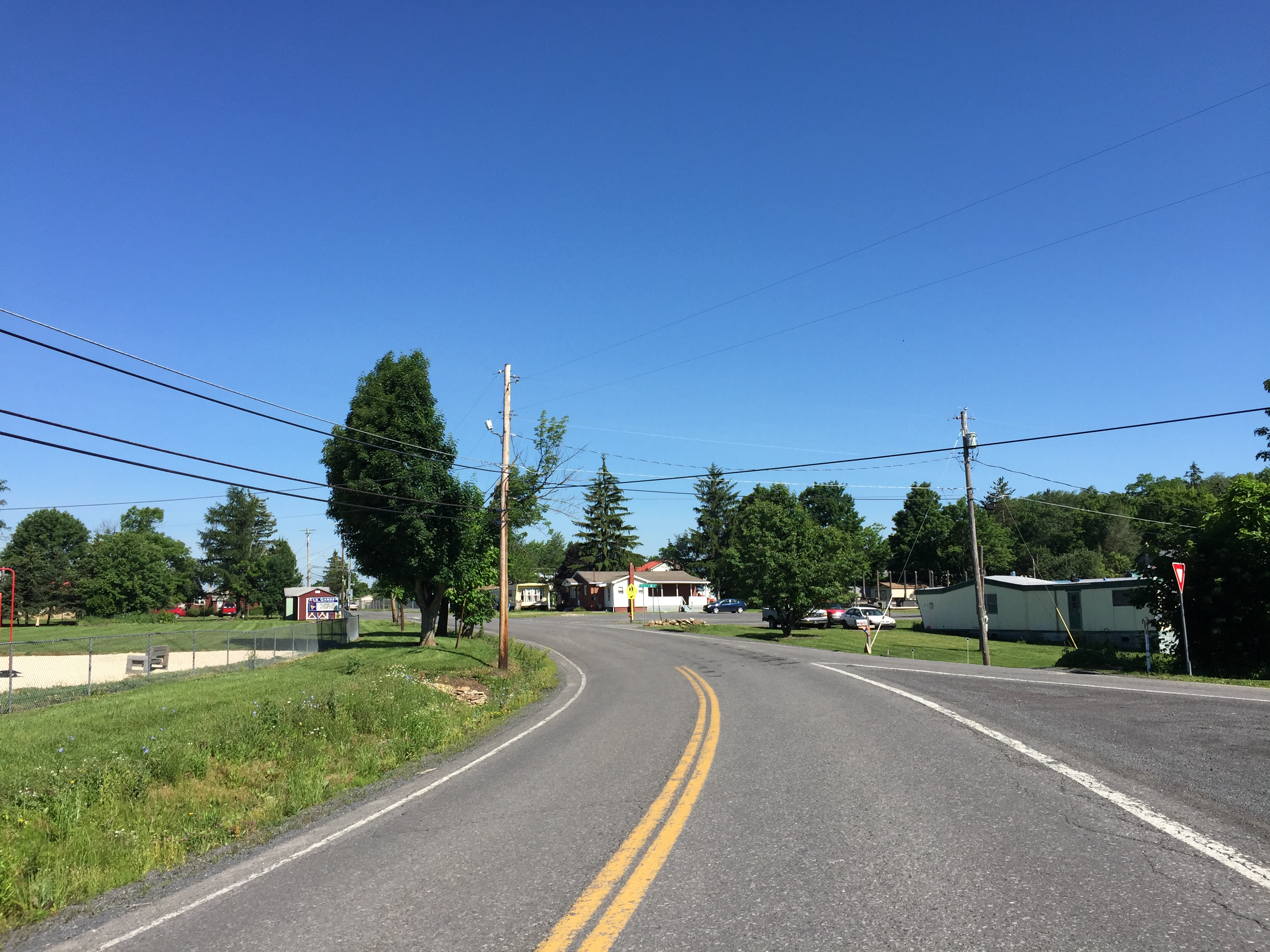
- View entering Elk Garden from the south via West Virginia Route 42

- Location of Elk Garden in Mineral County, West Virginia.
- Coordinates: 39°23′10″N 79°09′20″W
- Country: United States
- State: West Virginia
- County: Mineral

Area
  - Total: 0.26 sq mi (0.67 km^{2})
  - Land: 0.26 sq mi (0.67 km^{2})
  - Water: 0 sq mi (0.00 km^{2})
- Elevation: 2,264 ft (690 m)

Population (2020)
  - Total: 212
  - Estimate (2021): 210
  - Density: 823.1/sq mi (317.81/km^{2})
- Time zone: UTC-5 (Eastern (EST))
  - Summer (DST): UTC-4 (EDT)
- ZIP code: 26717
- Area code: 304
- FIPS code: 54-24484
- GNIS feature ID: 2390165

Elk Garden is a town in Mineral County, West Virginia, United States. It is part of the 'Cumberland, MD-WV Metropolitan Statistical Area'. The population was 211 at the 2020 census. Elk Garden High School was consolidated into Keyser High School in 1997. However the Primary School is still in session, offering classes from Pre-Kindergarten through the fifth grade. The school mascot is the Elk Garden Stags. Elk Garden was incorporated in 1890 by the Mineral County Circuit Court. It is named for an elk lick near the original town site.

== Geography ==
According to the United States Census Bureau, the town has a total area of 0.26 square miles (0.67 km^{2}), all land.

== Transportation ==
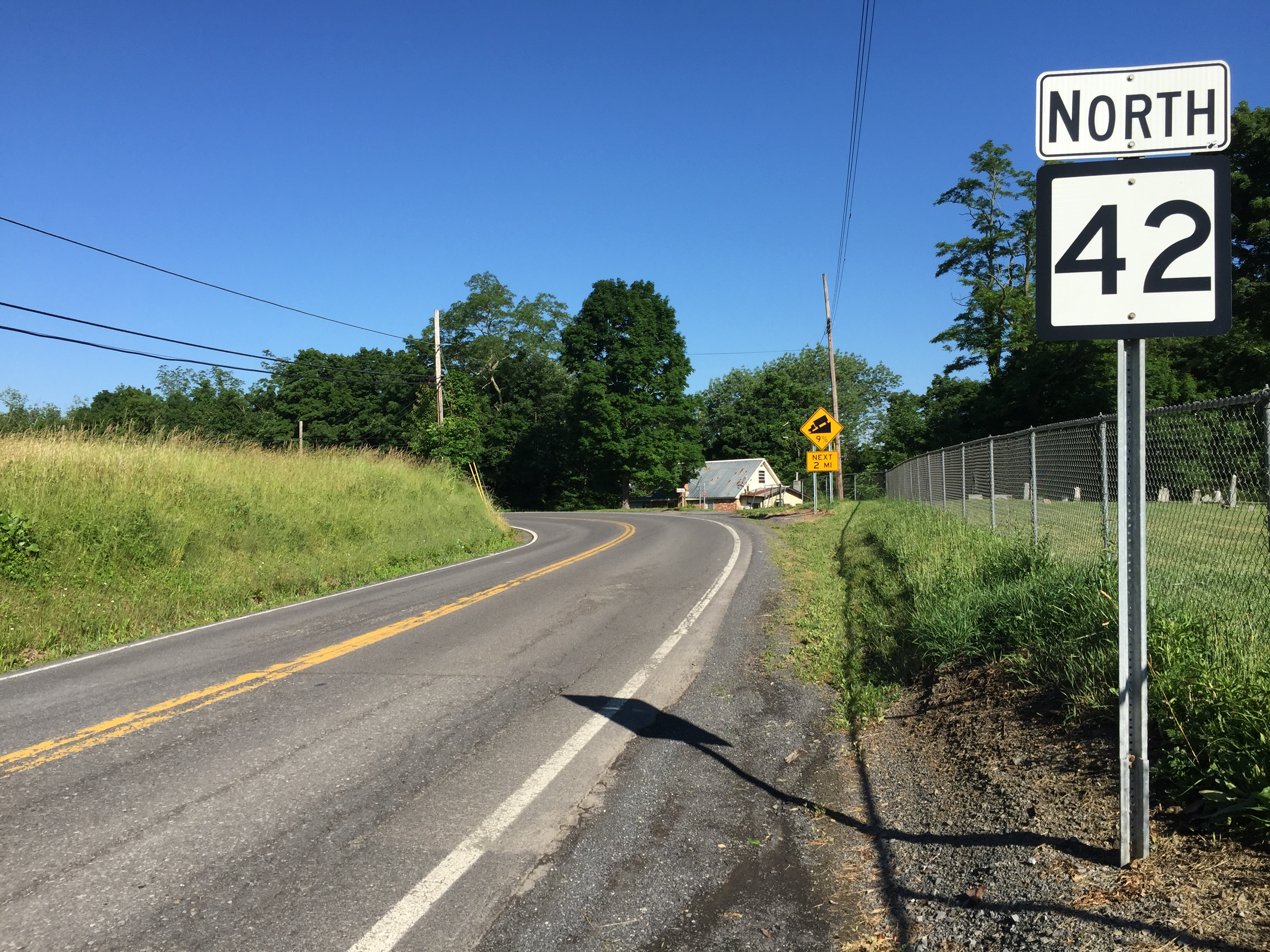
Route 42 northbound leaving Elk Garden

The only significant highway directly serving Elk Garden is West Virginia Route 42. Route 42 continues north to Maryland and extends southward to U.S. Route 50 and beyond to Petersburg. Just east of Elk Garden, West Virginia Route 46 has its western terminus at Route 42. Route 46 continues northeast, eventually reaching Luke.

== Demographics ==
Historical population
Census	Pop.	Note	%±
1890	723		—
1900	581		−19.6%
1910	438		−24.6%
1920	422		−3.7%
1930	299		−29.1%
1940	342		14.4%
1950	318		−7.0%
1960	329		3.5%
1970	291		−11.6%
1980	291		0.0%
1990	261		−10.3%
2000	217		−16.9%
2010	232		6.9%
2020	212		−8.6%
2021 (est.)	210	▼	−0.9%
U.S. Decennial Census

=== 2010 census ===
As of the census of 2010, there were 232 people, 92 households, and 69 families living in the town. The population density was 892.3 inhabitants per square mile (344.5/km^{2}). There were 108 housing units at an average density of 415.4 per square mile (160.4/km^{2}). The racial makeup of the town was 98.3% White and 1.7% from two or more races.

There were 92 households, of which 34.8% had children under the age of 18 living with them, 53.3% were married couples living together, 13.0% had a female householder with no husband present, 8.7% had a male householder with no wife present, and 25.0% were non-families. 22.8% of all households were made up of individuals, and 13.1% had someone living alone who was 65 years of age or older. The average household size was 2.52 and the average family size was 2.93.

The median age in the town was 41 years. 22.8% of residents were under the age of 18; 7.9% were between the ages of 18 and 24; 25.8% were from 25 to 44; 27.7% were from 45 to 64; and 15.9% were 65 years of age or older. The gender makeup of the town was 51.7% male and 48.3% female.

=== 2000 census ===
As of the census of 2000, there were 217 people, 89 households, and 59 families living in the town. The population density was 826.0 inhabitants per square mile (318.9/km^{2}). There were 103 housing units at an average density of 392.1 per square mile (151.4/km^{2}). The racial makeup of the town was 98.62% White, 0.46% African American, and 0.92% from two or more races.

There were 89 households, out of which 31.5% had children under the age of 18 living with them, 48.3% were married couples living together, 15.7% had a female householder with no husband present, and 32.6% were non-families. 29.2% of all households were made up of individuals, and 12.4% had someone living alone who was 65 years of age or older. The average household size was 2.44 and the average family size was 3.00.

In the town, the population was spread out, with 23.5% under the age of 18, 8.8% from 18 to 24, 26.3% from 25 to 44, 28.6% from 45 to 64, and 12.9% who were 65 years of age or older. The median age was 40 years. For every 100 females, there were 104.7 males. For every 100 females age 18 and over, there were 97.6 males.

The median income for a household in the town was $24,375, and the median income for a family was $26,964. Males had a median income of $26,071 versus $13,125 for females. The per capita income for the town was $11,453. About 21.7% of families and 22.9% of the population were below the poverty line, including 21.7% of those under the age of eighteen and 20.8% of those 65 or over.
