= West Virginia Route 46 =

State highway in West Virginia, United States

West Virginia Route 46

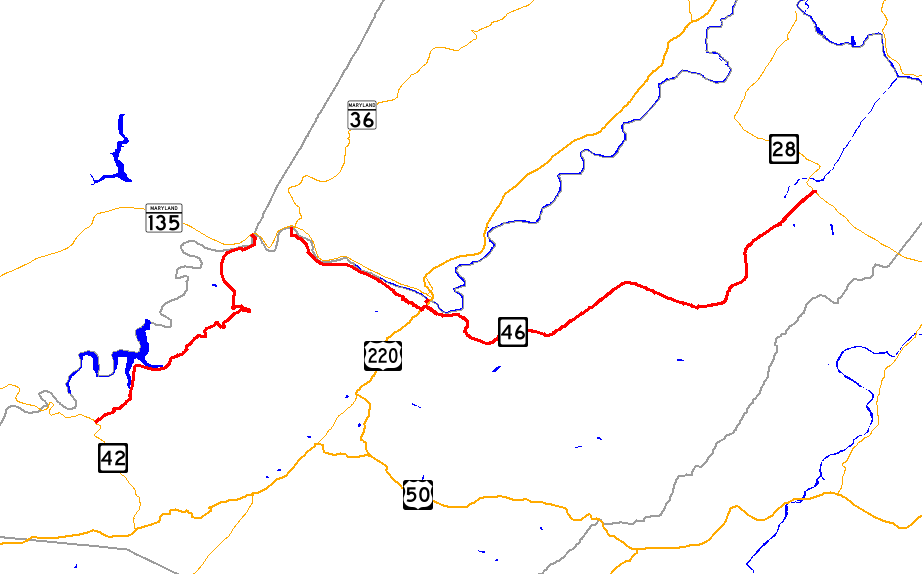

Route information
- Maintained by WVDOH
- Length: 32.0 mi (51.5 km)

Western section
- Length: 11.9 mi (19.2 km)
- West end: WV 42 in Elk Garden
- East end: MD 135 near Beryl

Eastern section
- Length: 20.9 mi (33.6 km)
- West end: MD 36 / MD 135 in Piedmont
- Major intersections: US 220 in Keyser
- East end: WV 28 / CR 15 in Fort Ashby

Location
- Country: United States
- State: West Virginia
- Counties: Mineral

Highway system
- West Virginia State Highway System; Interstate; US; State
← WV 45	→ WV 47

West Virginia Route 46 is an east–west state highway split into two segments in Mineral County, West Virginia, United States. The western terminus of the western segment is at West Virginia Route 42 in Elk Garden. The eastern terminus is at the Maryland state line north of Beryl, where WV 46 crosses the Potomac River and intersects Maryland Route 135 on the north bank.

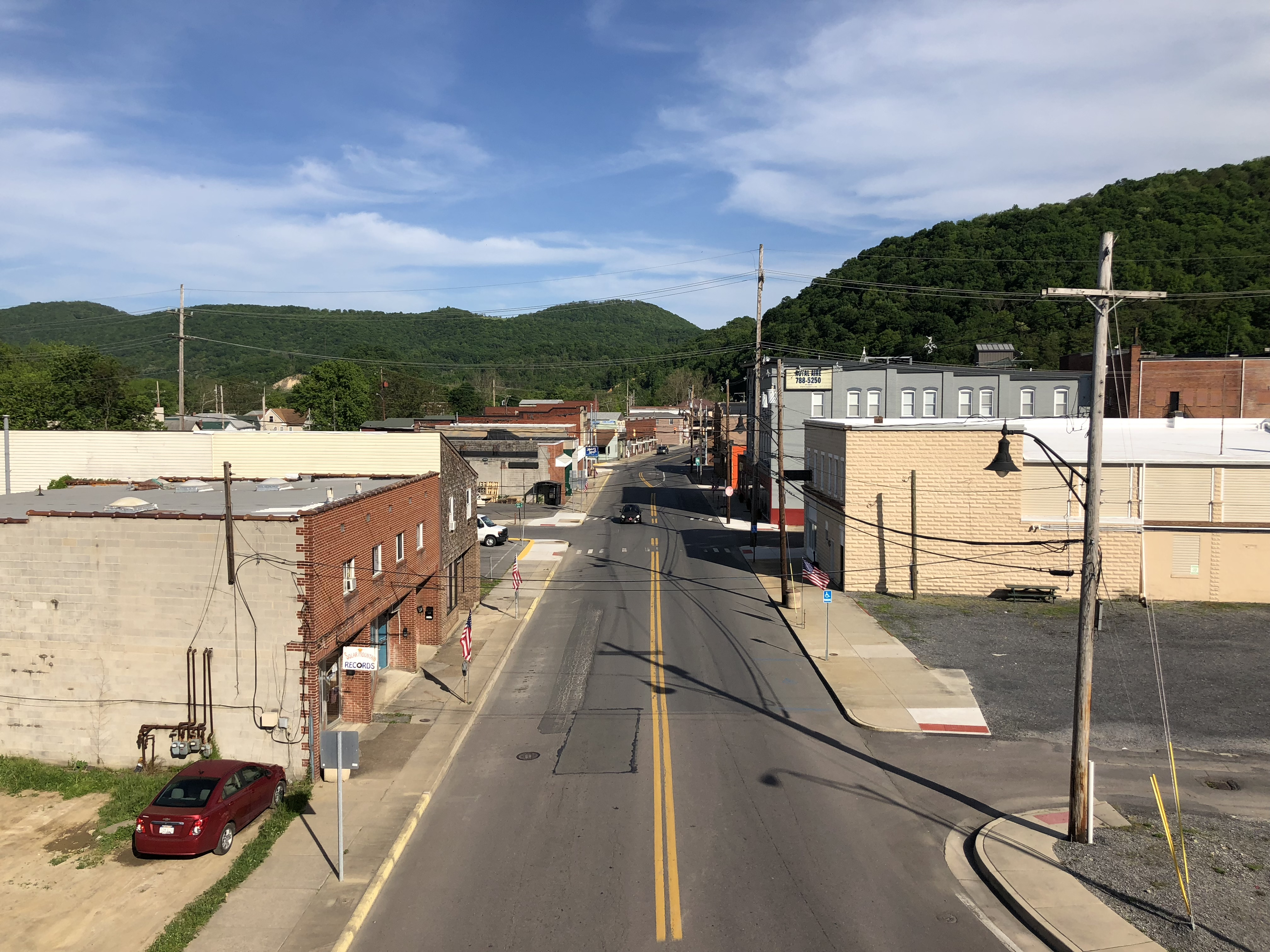
View east along WV 46 from US 220 in downtown Keyser

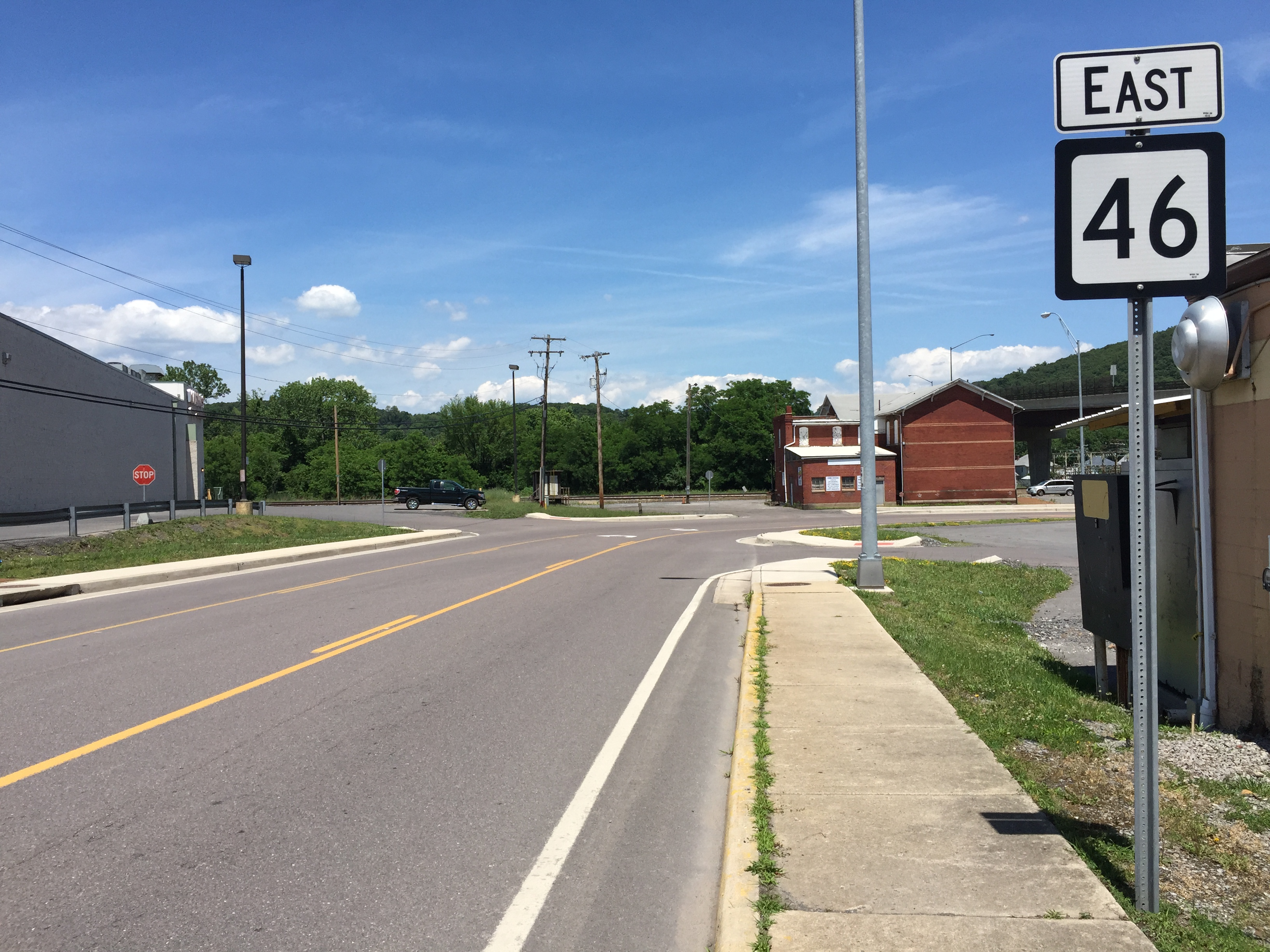
View east along WV 46 in Keyser

The western terminus of the eastern segment is at the Maryland state line in Piedmont, where WV 46 continues into Maryland as Maryland Route 36. The eastern terminus is at West Virginia Route 28 in Fort Ashby.

The two segments are connected by a two-mile (3 km) portion of MD 135 and MD 36 in Maryland's Allegany County.

== Attractions ==
- Jennings Randolph Lake

== Major intersections ==
County	Location	mi	km	Destinations	Notes
Mineral		0.0	0.0	WV 42 – Mount Storm, Kitzmiller, MD	
North Branch Potomac River				Beryl Bridge	
North Branch Potomac River		11.9	19.2	MD 135	Maryland state line
Gap in route
North Branch Potomac River		0.0	0.0	MD 36 north / MD 135	Maryland state line
North Branch Potomac River				Westernport Bridge	
Mineral	Keyser	5.2	8.4	US 220 (Mineral Street) to US 50 – Cumberland, MD, Moorefield	interchange westbound; intersection eastbound
Mineral	Fort Ashby	20.9	33.6	WV 28 / CR 15 (Dans Run Road) – Cumberland, MD, Romney	
1.000 mi = 1.609 km; 1.000 km = 0.621 mi
