= National Register of Historic Places listings in Grant County, West Virginia =

Location of Grant County in West Virginia

This is a list of the National Register of Historic Places listings in Grant County, West Virginia.

This is intended to be a complete list of the properties and districts on the National Register of Historic Places in Grant County, West Virginia, United States. The locations of National Register properties and districts for which the latitude and longitude coordinates are included below, may be seen in a Google map.

There are 7 properties listed on the National Register in the county.

This National Park Service list is complete through NPS recent listings posted October 16, 2026.

Contents: Counties in West Virginia

Barbour - Berkeley - Boone - Braxton - Brooke - Cabell - Calhoun - Clay - Doddridge - Fayette - Gilmer - Grant - Greenbrier - Hampshire - Hancock - Hardy - Harrison - Jackson - Jefferson - Kanawha - Lewis - Lincoln - Logan - Marion - Marshall - Mason - McDowell - Mercer - Mineral - Mingo - Monongalia - Monroe - Morgan - Nicholas - Ohio - Pendleton - Pleasants - Pocahontas - Preston - Putnam - Raleigh - Randolph - Ritchie - Roane - Summers - Taylor - Tucker - Tyler - Upshur - Wayne - Webster - Wetzel - Wirt - Wood - Wyoming

== Current listings ==
	Name on the Register	Image	Date listed	Location	City or town	Description
1	Fairfax Stone Site	Fairfax Stone Site	January 26, 1970 (#70000653)	North of William at corner of Grant, Preston, and Tucker counties 39°11′42″N 79°29′16″W	William vicinity	
2	Gormania Presbyterian Church	Gormania Presbyterian Church	September 7, 2005 (#05001008)	Mabis Ave., 0.1 miles south of U.S. Route 50; 39°17′40″N 79°20′46″W	Gormania	
3	Grant County Courthouse	Grant County Courthouse	October 26, 1979 (#79003306)	Virginia Ave. 38°59′35″N 79°07′15″W	Petersburg	
4	Hermitage Motor Inn	Hermitage Motor Inn	January 14, 1986 (#86000776)	Virginia Ave. 38°59′35″N 79°07′12″W	Petersburg	
5	The Manor	The Manor	December 18, 1975 (#75001886)	North of Petersburg off WV 42; 39°00′36″N 79°07′40″W	Petersburg vicinity	
6	Rohrbaugh Cabin		November 3, 1993 (#93000490)	Smokehole Rd. (County Route 28/11), 3 miles south of junction with WV 28/WV 55, Monongahela National Forest; 38°57′20″N 79°14′31″W	Petersburg vicinity	
7	Noah Snyder Farm		June 10, 1975 (#75001885)	1.5 miles south of Lahmansville on County Route 5; 39°06′35″N 79°05′56″W	Lahmansville vicinity	

== See also ==
- List of National Historic Landmarks in West Virginia
- National Register of Historic Places listings in West Virginia
