= Seymourville, West Virginia =

- Unincorporated community
- Location within West Virginia Location within the United States
- Coordinates: 39°03′25″N 79°06′32″W
- Country: United States
- State: West Virginia
- County: Grant
- Elevation: 1,030 ft (310 m)
- Time zone: UTC-5 (Eastern (EST))
  - Summer (DST): UTC-4 (EDT)
- Area codes: 304 & 681
- GNIS feature ID: 1555594

Seymourville is an unincorporated community in Grant County, West Virginia, United States. Seymourville is 4.5 miles (7.2 km) north of Petersburg.
