= Streby, West Virginia =

- Unincorporated community
- Location within the state of West Virginia Streby (the United States)
- Coordinates: 39°04′49″N 79°14′22″W
- Country: United States
- State: West Virginia
- County: Grant
- Elevation: 1,739 ft (530 m)
- Time zone: UTC-5 (Eastern (EST))
  - Summer (DST): UTC-4 (EDT)
- GNIS feature ID: 1553097

Streby was an unincorporated community in Grant County, West Virginia, United States. Its post office is closed.
