= Noah Snyder Farm =

Historic house in West Virginia, United States

- U.S. National Register of Historic Places
- Location within West Virginia Location within the United States
- Location: 1.5 miles south of Lahmansville on County Route 5, near Lahmansville, West Virginia
- Coordinates: 39°6′35″N 79°5′56″W
- Area: 2 acres (0.81 ha)
- Built: 1853
- MPS: South Branch Valley MRA (AD)
- NRHP reference No.: 75001885
- Added to NRHP: June 10, 1975

Noah Snyder Farm, also known as Snyder House, is a historic home located near Lahmansville, Grant County, West Virginia. The original four room log house was built in 1853. Sometime during the American Civil War, the Cooplinger section was moved to the site and added to the original building. A third section, the kitchen ell, was originally built between 1800 and 1815. All three sections were unified under a gable roof in about 1870. Also on the property are the contributing wagon shed, storage cellar with granary above, log stable, and smokehouse.

It was listed on the National Register of Historic Places in 1975.
