= Arthur, West Virginia =

Unincorporated community in West Virginia, United States

- Unincorporated community
- Location within West Virginia Location within the United States
- Coordinates: 39°04′02″N 79°06′43″W
- Country: United States
- State: West Virginia
- County: Grant
- Elevation: 1,096 ft (334 m)
- Time zone: UTC-5 (Eastern (EST))
  - Summer (DST): UTC-4 (EDT)
- GNIS feature ID: 1549570

Arthur is an unincorporated community on Lunice Creek in Grant County, West Virginia, United States. It lies along County Route 5 north of Petersburg.
