= Carrie Williams =

African-American educator (née Edwards) (c. 1866 – 1930)

- Born: Caroline M. Edwards circa 1866; Chillicothe, Ohio, U.S.
- Died: January 22, 1930 (aged 63–64); Chicago, Illinois, U.S.
- Occupation: Educator
- Known for: Plaintiff in Williams v. Board of Education of Fairfax District (1896)
- Spouse: Abraham L. Williams
- Children: 9

Caroline "Carrie" M. Williams (née Edwards) (c. 1866 – January 22, 1930) was an African American educator in West Virginia in the United States. Williams fought and won a significant 1898 civil rights case, Williams v. Board of Education of Fairfax District, which upheld West Virginia's law requiring equal school terms, and established equal pay for teachers regardless of their race.

== Early life ==
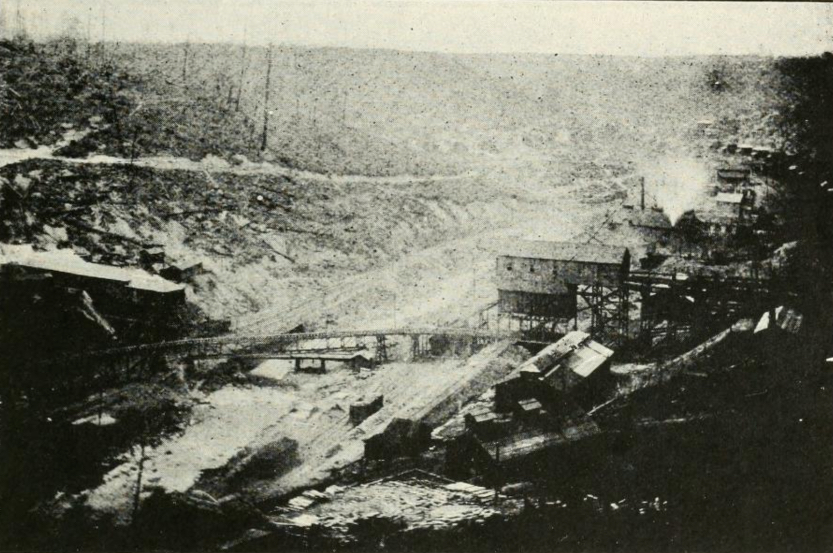
The Davis Coal and Coke Company's Coketon Colliery in Coketon

Edwards was born in Chillicothe, Ohio circa 1866, the daughter of Jacob and Rachel Edwards. Edwards taught as a schoolteacher in Ohio before relocating to West Virginia, where she continued teaching. On November 20, 1889, she married Abraham L. Williams, a coal miner, in Thomas in Tucker County, West Virginia. Williams and her husband had nine children: May, Nevada, Robert, Russell, Irving, Ethel, Josephine, Juanita, and Wendell Phillips.

== Williams v. Board of Education of Fairfax District ==
=== Employment at Coketon Colored School ===
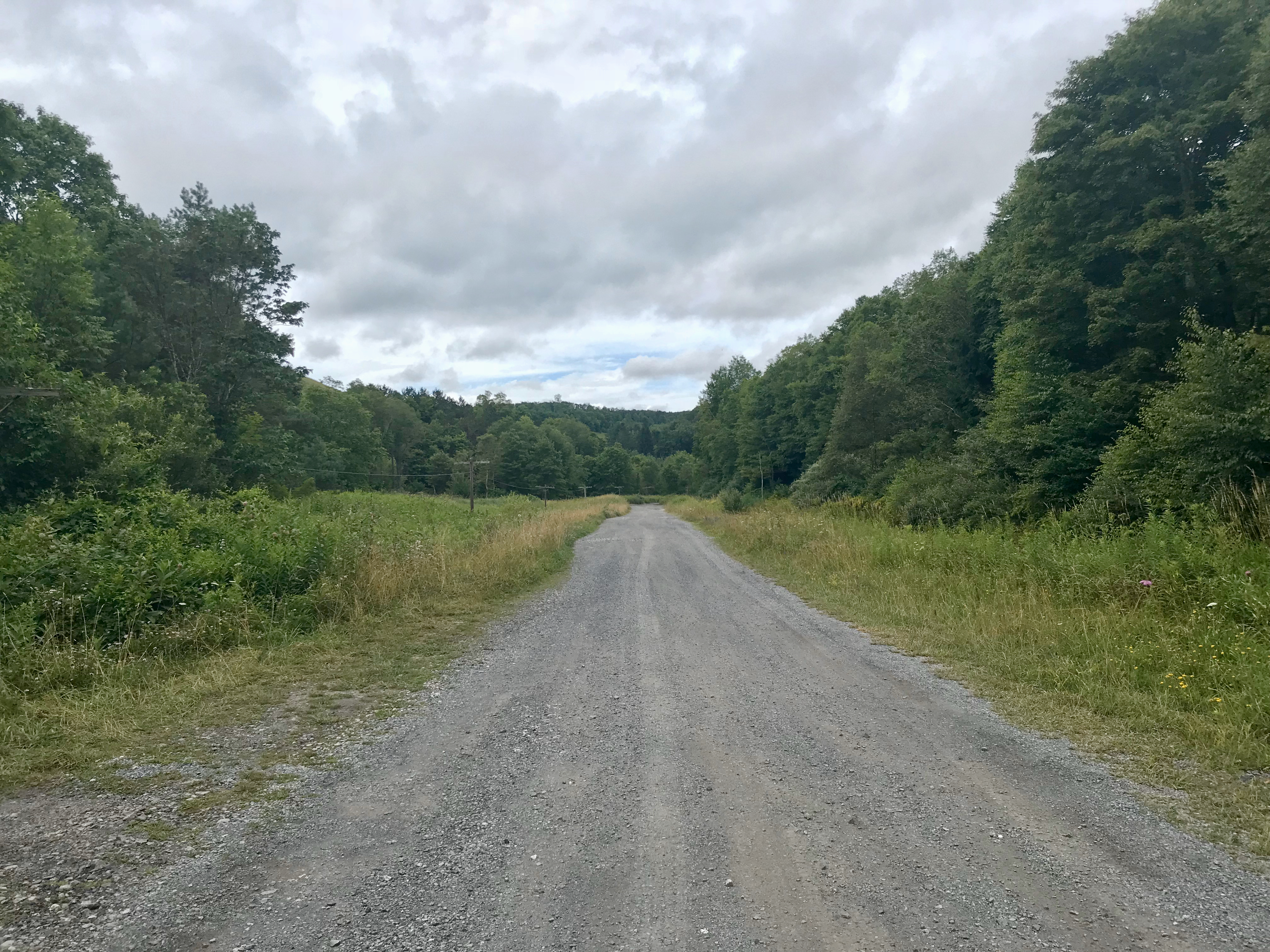
A photograph of Rail Falls Road (West Virginia Secondary Route 27/3), along a former rail bed, between Coketon and Douglas

In 1892, while 26 years old and pregnant with her third child, Williams was hired by the Board of Education of Fairfax District to teach at the two-room Coketon Colored School in the mining community of Coketon. Coketon was located along the western side of North Fork Blackwater River on the Western Maryland Railway, within Tucker County's Fairfax District. The community was established by the Davis Coal and Coke Company of Henry Gassaway Davis for the purposes of producing coke for the coal mines of nearby Thomas; the company's headquarters were also located here. The influx of timber workers and coal miners between 1890 and 1900 doubled Tucker County's population from 6,459 people to 13,433. The increased population included the county's African American population, which increased from 183 in 1890 to 253 in 1900; the majority of the county's African American population resided in Coketon.

=== School board establishment of unequal school terms ===
The residents of Tucker County's Fairfax District (Note: Fairfax District is a section of northern Tucker County, bordering the southwestern tip of Western Maryland, and consists mostly of the watershed of the North Fork Blackwater River.) voted for an eight-month school term. However, while the Board of Education of Fairfax District decided to set term length for white schools at eight months, it set the term for Coketon Colored School at only five months. This was presented as a cost-cutting measure, and because the school board expected limited enrollment in the district's African American schools.

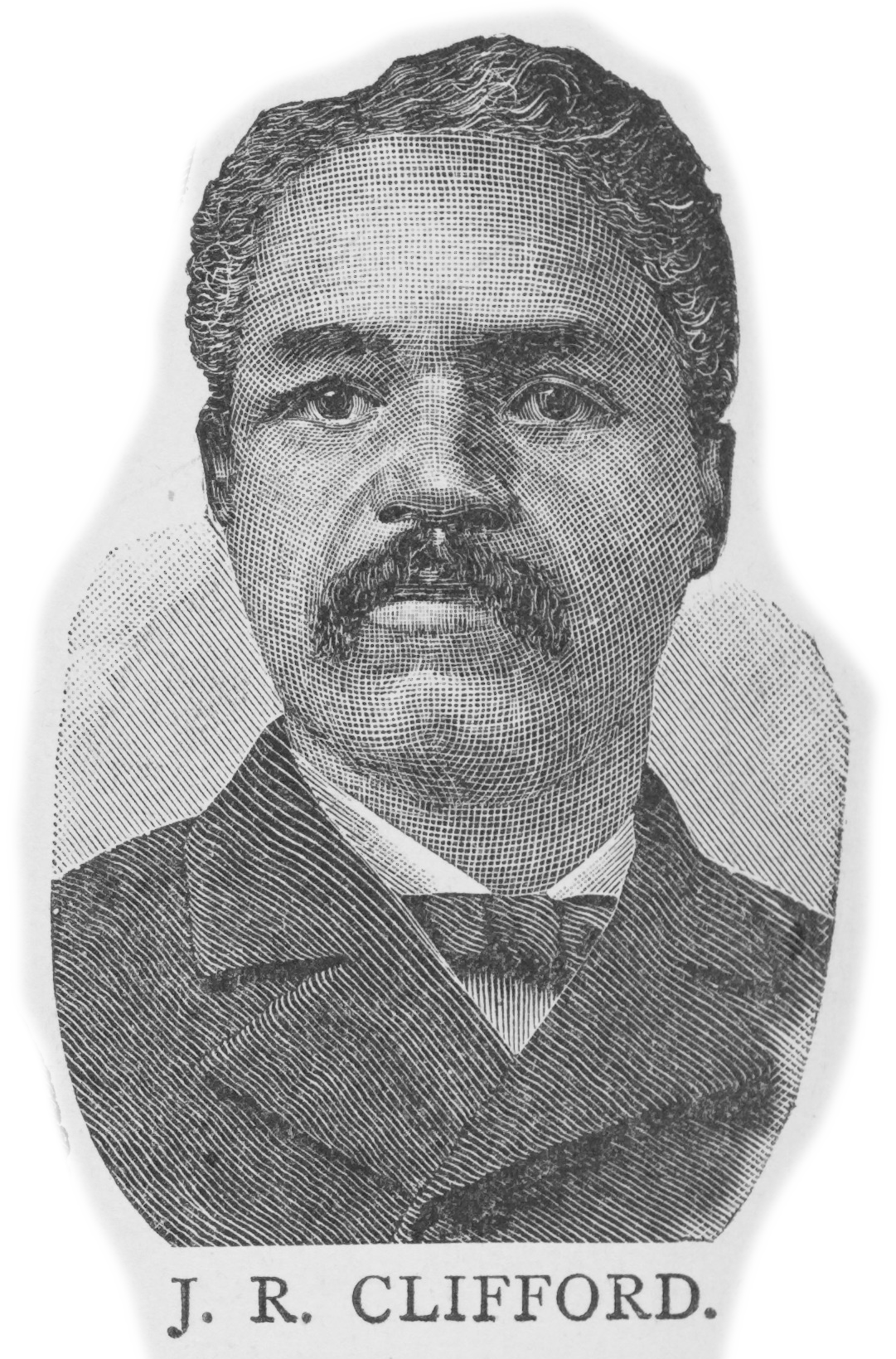
J. R. Clifford

For the 1892–1893 school year, the Board of Education of Fairfax District tendered a five-month contract to Williams, which she refused to sign at the board's repeated request. Despite the lack of a signed contract, the school board allowed Williams to teach for five months. J. R. Clifford, West Virginia's first African American practicing attorney, advised Williams to teach at the Coketon Colored School for eight months and present the school board with a bill for her final three months of wages; should the school board refuse to pay, he would file a lawsuit on her behalf.

Clifford gave Williams this legal advice knowing that Third Judicial Circuit Court judge Joseph Thatcher Hoke was likely to be supportive: Hoke was an advocate for the African American Storer College, and while serving as prosecuting attorney in Berkeley County, he offered boarding in Martinsburg to Free Will Baptist mission teachers who taught freedmen in Berkeley and Jefferson counties.

At the conclusion of the district's five-month school term for the African American students, the school board demanded that Williams close the Coketon Colored School while the white schools remained open. Williams refused and, with the support of the Coketon community's African American parents, kept the school open for the additional three months. When the school year ended in June 1893, Williams presented the school board with a bill for her final three months teaching. This period of pay totaled $120 (equivalent to $4,200 in 2024 dollars), less $1 for failure to return a term report required by law. The school board refused to pay Williams because she had continued to teach knowing that she had been presented with a five-month contract.

=== Lawsuit and appeals ===
On June 30, 1893, Clifford and prominent Republican lawyer Alston G. Dayton filed a lawsuit on Williams' behalf against the Board of Education of Fairfax District in the Third Judicial Circuit Court in Tucker County. On August 20, 1893, Clifford received a letter from the secretary for the Tucker County Board of Education warning him not to move forward with the case. That following November, he proceeded in filing a lawsuit against the Fairfax District school board for the $120 owed to Williams, plus the $1 that had been withheld.

The case did not appear before the circuit court until March 1894. Clifford argued that because West Virginia state law required equal school terms for both white and African-American children, Williams was owed her salary for the additional three months. The counsel for the school district argued that Williams was not owed pay for the final three months because she lacked a written contract. Third Judicial Circuit Court judge Hoke presided over the court's proceedings and the jury found in Williams' favor. Hoke ordered the school board to pay Williams $139 (equivalent to $5,052 in 2024), which included interest, and the cost of her legal fees. The school board appealed the case to the Supreme Court of Appeals of West Virginia. On June 11, 1898, the case was submitted to the Supreme Court, which affirmed the circuit court's ruling in Williams' favor on November 16, 1898. Clifford and Dayton represented Williams' case at the Supreme Court. The Supreme Court's decision upheld West Virginia's law requiring equal school terms, and further established equal pay for teachers regardless of their race.

In the Supreme Court's ruling, Justice Marmaduke H. Dent wrote: "Discrimination against the colored people, because of color alone, as to privileges, immunities, and equal legal protection, is contrary to public policy and the law of the land. If any discrimination as to education should be made, it should be favorable to, and not against, the colored people." According to Henry Louis Gates Jr. and Evelyn Brooks Higginbotham in African American National Biography (2013), this case was "one of the few, if not the first, cases in the South to state that discrimination on the basis of color was illegal." Gates and Higginbotham also noted that this ruling had the effect of "attracting highly educated teachers to the state and challenging nearby states to provide equal pay as well."

== Later life, death, and legacy ==
Williams' husband Abraham died of consumption on August 30, 1913. Williams' daughter Nevada died in 1918 during the influenza pandemic and was interred in an unmarked grave in Thomas' Rose Hill Cemetery. Williams and her younger children joined her older children in Chicago, where she remained until her death on January 22, 1930.

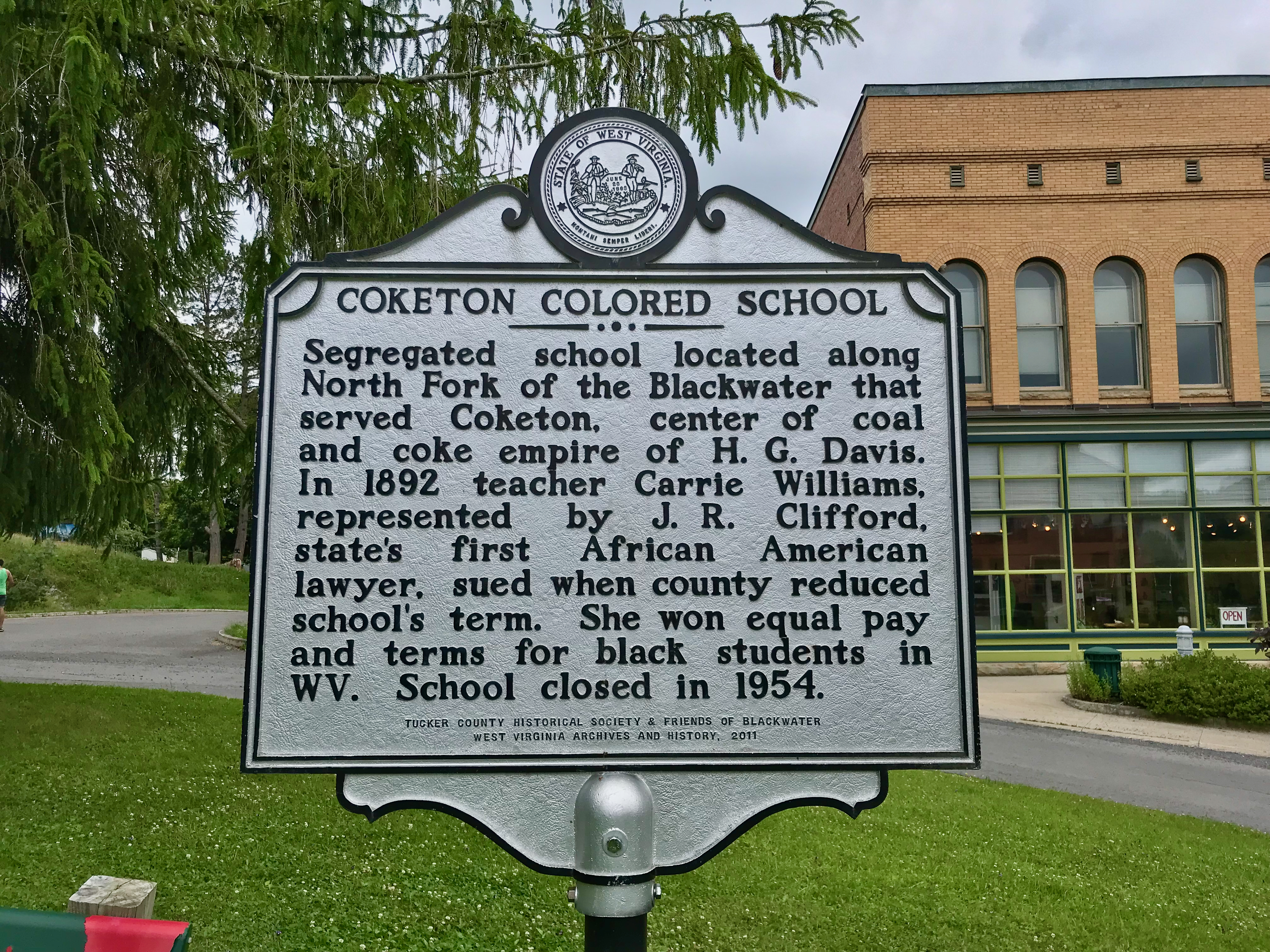
The state historical marker in Thomas detailing the Coketon Colored School

In 2011, Williams and her case were recognized with a highway historical marker as part of the West Virginia Highway Historical Marker Program, which is managed by West Virginia Archives and History, a part of the West Virginia Division of Culture and History. The marker, located at the Tucker County Courthouse in Parsons, reads:

In 1892, Coketon Colored School teacher Carrie Williams sued the local school board for equal pay. She was represented by the first African American lawyer in WV, J. R. Clifford, in front of Judge Hoke. Local jury found for her and she won appeal at WV Supreme Court. This early civil rights case affirmed equal school terms for African Americans in WV.

Also in 2011, a historical marker for the Coketon Colored School was erected on Douglas Road (West Virginia Secondary Route 27) in Thomas. This marker reads:

Segregated school located along North Fork of the Blackwater that served Coketon, center of coal and coke empire of H. G. Davis. In 1892 teacher Carrie Williams, represented by J. R. Clifford, state's first African American lawyer, sued when county reduced school's term. She won equal pay and terms for black students in WV. School closed in 1954.

In 2020, artist Alison "Ali" Printz completed a 21-foot (6.4 m) by 17-foot (5.2 m) mural of Williams across the back of the Buxton and Landstreet Gallery and Studios in Thomas, facing toward the Blackwater Canyon Trail, along the North Fork Blackwater River.

== Bibliography ==
- Costantini, Kathleen Jackson (2019). An Allegheny Triumph of Justice: Carrie Williams' Courageous Fight for Equal Rights in the Early Jim Crow Era. Charleston, West Virginia: 35th Star Publishing. ISBN 978-0-9965764-4-4. OCLC 1118695540.
- Gates, Henry Louis Jr.; Higginbotham, Evelyn Brooks, eds. (2013). African American National Biography. Vol. 3 (2nd ed.). Oxford, England & New York City, New York: Oxford University Press. ISBN 978-0-19-999038-2. OCLC 844083432 – via the Internet Archive.
- Houston, Charles Hamilton (October 1935). "A Leaf from the Past". The Crisis. 42 (10). New York City, New York: Crisis Publishing Company, Inc.: 301 – via the Internet Archive.
- Kenny, Hamill (1945). West Virginia Place Names, Their Origin and Meaning. Piedmont, West Virginia: The Place Name Press. OCLC 574551172. Archived from the original on October 26, 2021 – via HathiTrust.
- Podvia, Mark W. (2015). "Williams v. Board of Education of Fairfax District: Bringing a Long Forgotten West Virginia Case to Life" (PDF). Unbound: A Review of Legal History and Rare Books. 8. Legal History and Rare Books Special Interest Section of the American Association of Law Libraries. Archived (PDF) from the original on May 24, 2018.
- Reger, David B., ed. (1923). West Virginia Geological Survey: Tucker County. Wheeling, West Virginia: Wheeling News Litho. Co. OCLC 567996732 – via the Internet Archive.
- Rice, Connie Park (Fall 2007). "'Don't Flinch nor Yield an Inch': J. R. Clifford and the Struggle for Equal Rights in West Virginia". West Virginia History. 1 (2). Morgantown, West Virginia: West Virginia University Press: 45–68. doi:10.1353/wvh.2008.0030. JSTOR 43264770. S2CID 162385384.
- Rucker, Edgar P., ed. (1899). "Williams v. Board of Education of Fairfax District". Reports of Cases Argued and Determined in the Supreme Court of Appeals of West Virginia. XLV. Charleston, West Virginia: The Tribune Company Press: 199–203. OCLC 1194120526 – via the Internet Archive.
