= Hermitage Motor Inn =

Historic building in West Virginia, US

- U.S. National Register of Historic Places
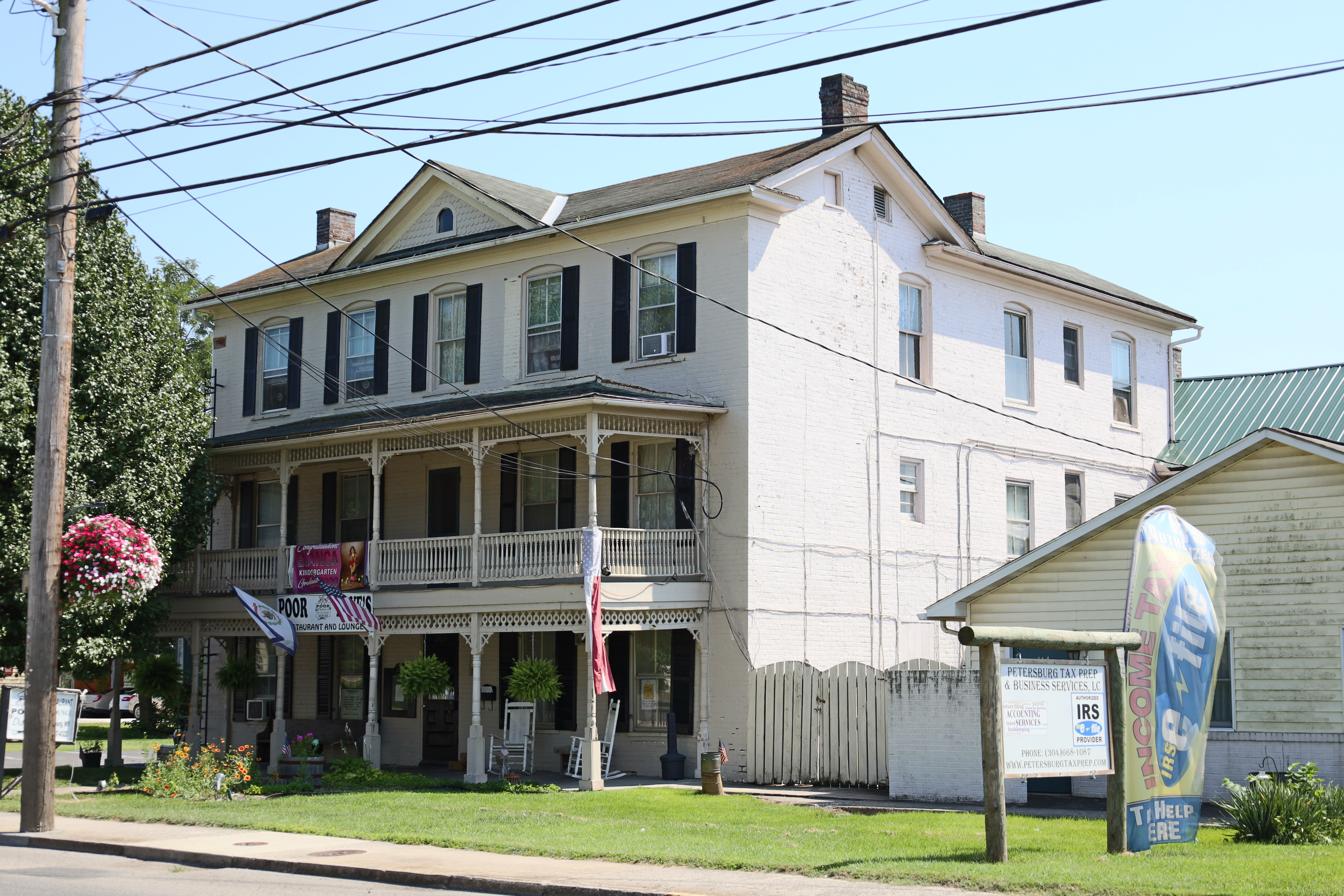
- Hermitage Motor Inn, May 2011

- Location within West Virginia Location within the United States
- Location: Virginia Ave., Petersburg, West Virginia
- Coordinates: 38.9928°N 79.1211°W
- Area: 1 acre (0.40 ha)
- Built: c. 1840
- Architectural style: Greek Revival, Vernacular Greek Revival
- MPS: South Branch Valley MRA
- NRHP reference No.: 86000776
- Added to NRHP: January 14, 1986

The Hermitage Inn and Taphouse, previously the Hermitage Motor Inn and Taylor Cunningham Hotel, is an historic lodge in Petersburg, Grant County, West Virginia, US. It was built about 1840, and was originally a two-story brick building in a vernacular Greek Revival style. The hotel is older than Grant County and the state of West Virginia. A third story was added in the early 20th century. It features a two-story porch with turned post and balusters.It has been in continuous operation as an inn since 1881. Also on the property are the contributing wagon shed, storage cellar with granary above, log stable, and smokehouse.

It was listed on the National Register of Historic Places in 1986.

In 2021, the Hermitage Inn and Taphouse underwent an extensive renovation. The interior and exterior of both the inn and restaurant are fully updated, preserved using Historic Tax Credits, and modernized.

== See also ==
- List of motels
- National Register of Historic Places listings in Grant County, West Virginia
- Hermitage Inn and Taphouse
