= Kline Gap, West Virginia =

- Unincorporated community
- Location within the state of West Virginia Kline Gap (the United States)
- Coordinates: 39°4′20″N 79°11′33″W
- Country: United States
- State: West Virginia
- County: Grant
- Elevation: 1,345 ft (410 m)
- Time zone: UTC-5 (Eastern (EST))
  - Summer (DST): UTC-4 (EDT)
- GNIS feature ID: 1551659

Kline Gap is an unincorporated community in Grant County, West Virginia, United States.
