= Masonville, West Virginia =

- Unincorporated community
- Location within West Virginia Location within the United States
- Coordinates: 38°55′7″N 79°5′1″W
- Country: United States
- State: West Virginia
- County: Grant
- Elevation: 1,247 ft (380 m)
- Time zone: UTC-5 (Eastern (EST))
  - Summer (DST): UTC-4 (EDT)
- GNIS feature ID: 1555064

Masonville is an unincorporated community in Grant County, West Virginia, United States. Its post office is closed. It was also known as Spring Gap.
