= Gormania Presbyterian Church =

Historic church in West Virginia, United States

- U.S. National Register of Historic Places
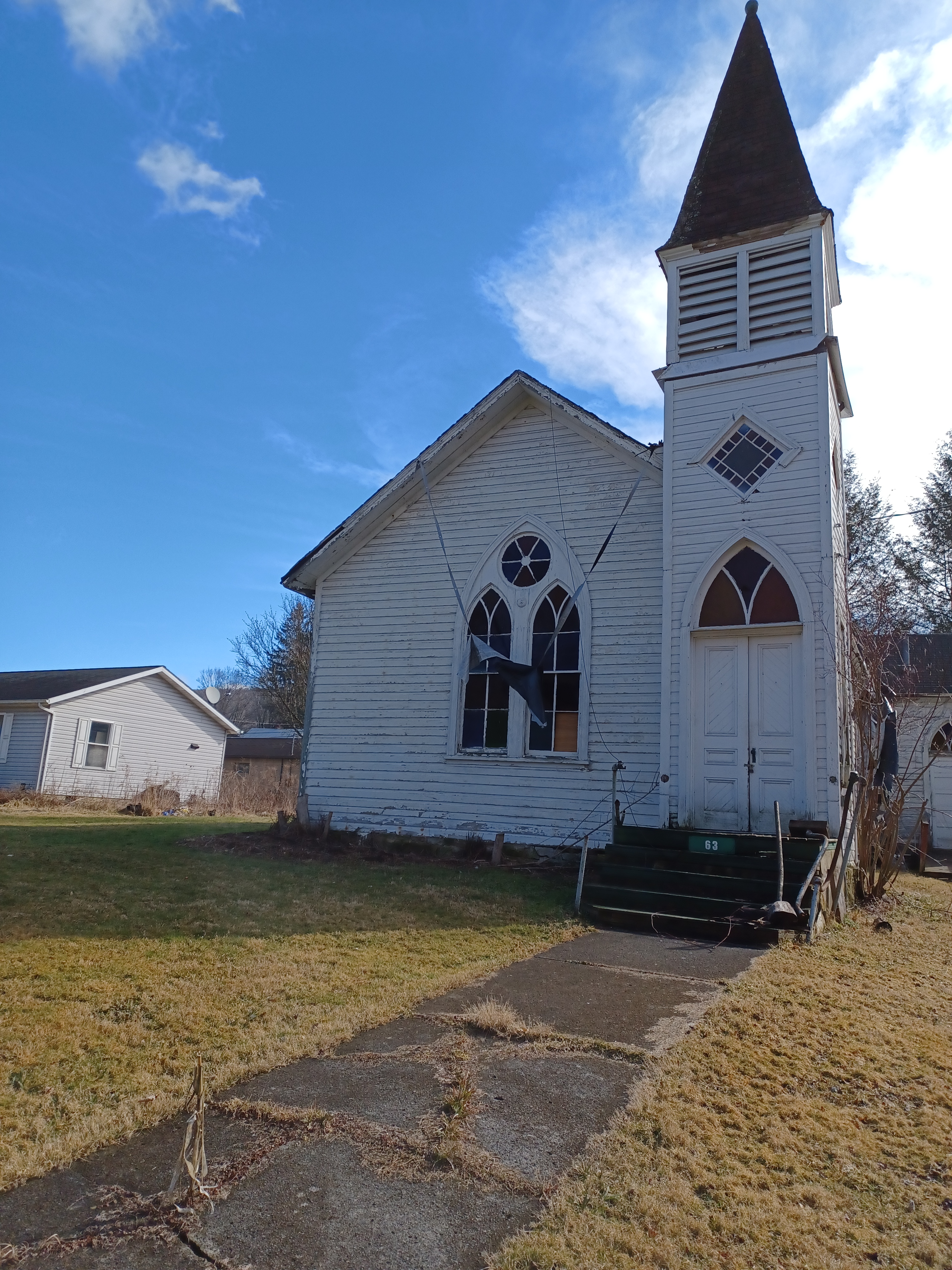

- Location within West Virginia Location within the United States
- Location: Mabis Ave., 0.1 mi. S of US 50, Gormania, West Virginia
- Coordinates: 39.2925°N 79.3461°W
- Area: 0.3 acres (0.12 ha)
- Built: 1888
- Architectural style: Late Gothic Revival
- NRHP reference No.: 05001008
- Added to NRHP: September 7, 2005

Gormania Presbyterian Church, now known as Gormania United Methodist Church, is a historic Presbyterian church on Mabis Avenue, 0.1 miles south of US 50 in Gormania, Grant County, West Virginia. It was built in 1888, and is a single-story ornate wooden structure in a late form of the Gothic Revival style. It features a corner entrance bell tower and spire. A rear addition including three Sunday school rooms was built in 1925. It was occupied by a Presbyterian congregation until the 1980s. In 1994, the Gormania United Methodist Church purchased the building. It was listed on the National Register of Historic Places in 2005.
