= Seemly, West Virginia =

- Unincorporated community
- Location within West Virginia Location within the United States
- Coordinates: 38°52′27″N 79°08′33″W
- Country: United States
- State: West Virginia
- County: Grant
- Elevation: 1,198 ft (365 m)
- Time zone: UTC-5 (Eastern (EST))
  - Summer (DST): UTC-4 (EDT)
- GNIS feature ID: 1697272

Seemly was an unincorporated community in Grant County, West Virginia, United States. Its post office is closed.
