= Hopeville =

Hopeville may refer to:

- Hopeville, Connecticut, a village in Griswald, New London County
- Hopeville, Iowa, an unincorporated community in Doyle Township, Clarke County
- Hopeville, Ontario, a community in Southgate
- Hopeville, West Virginia, an unincorporated community in Grant County
