= Coketon, West Virginia =

Unincorporated community in West Virginia, United States

Coketon
- Unincorporated community
- Location within the state of West Virginia Coketon (the United States)
- Coordinates: 39°08′24″N 79°30′43″W
- Country: United States
- State: West Virginia
- County: Tucker
- Elevation: 2,900 ft (880 m)
- Time zone: UTC-5 (Eastern (EST))
  - Summer (DST): UTC-4 (EDT)
- GNIS feature ID: 1554170

Coketon is an unincorporated community and coal town in Tucker County, West Virginia, United States. Coketon lies at the confluence of Snyder Run and the North Fork Blackwater River, south of the town of Thomas.

== Coal and coke production ==
The town was formed by the Davis Coal & Coke Company, led by Henry G. Davis, in the 1880s after large coal reserves were discovered in the area. In the company's prime, the town housed around 1,500 people, most of whom were immigrants. During each year from 1915 to 1921, the 15 mines near Coketon shipped over 1 million tons of coal, making it the sixth most productive operation in West Virginia at the time. The Davis Coal & Coke Company pioneered the "beehive" ovens, which were large sealed ovens which heated the coal to burn off impurities to make coke. The Davis Coal & Coke Company experimented with two of these ovens in 1887, and by 1900, there were over 600 beehive ovens. However, in 1915, a change in mining technology revolutionized the steel-making process, thereby eliminating the need for coke ovens at the mine site. By 1919, there was no coke production whatsoever in Tucker County, leaving the long banks of obsolete coke ovens unused.

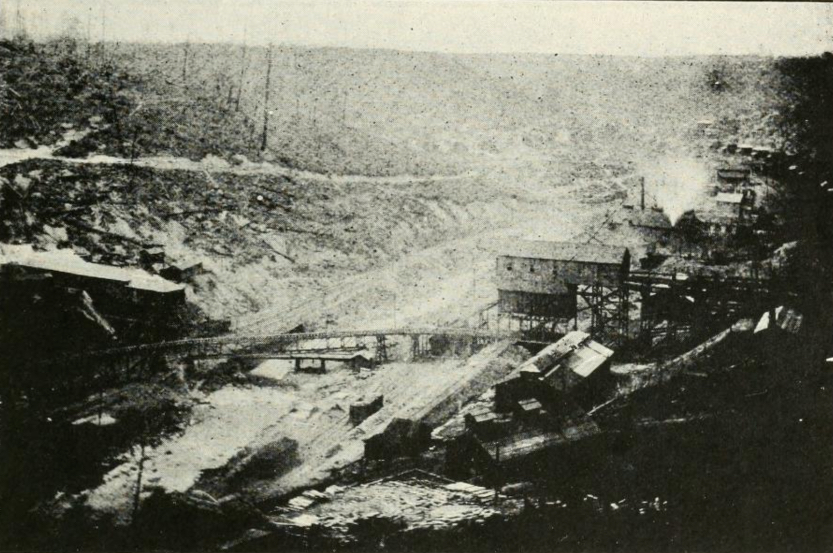
The Davis Coal and Coke Company's Coketon Colliery in Coketon

Soon after, coal production in Coketon also began fading. From the 1920s to the 1940s, the underground coal supplies were gradually depleted. As the coal production slowed and the mines closed, the population slowly declined, and the facility slowly began to shut down. By 1950, only two mines were still working and tonnage had fallen to 100,000 by 1954. By 1956, underground mining had ceased altogether with a few surface mining operations producing coal through 1965.

== Racial history ==
The Coketon Colored School was the center of a Civil Rights case in 1892. When the all-white Tucker County Board of Education instructed the Coketon Colored School’s teacher Carrie Williams to shorten the school year and teach three months less than the county’s white schools, Williams continued teaching for the full eight-month schedule and demanded full pay. Her lawyer, J.R. Clifford, was a prominent civil rights activist and the first African American lawyer in West Virginia. The case started in the Tucker County Courthouse in Parsons, and eventually reached the West Virginia Supreme Court. Their eventual victory in court was the first civil rights case in the history of the United States to determine discrimination on the basis of color to be illegal.
