= J. R. Clifford =

African-American attorney (1848–1933)

John Robert Clifford
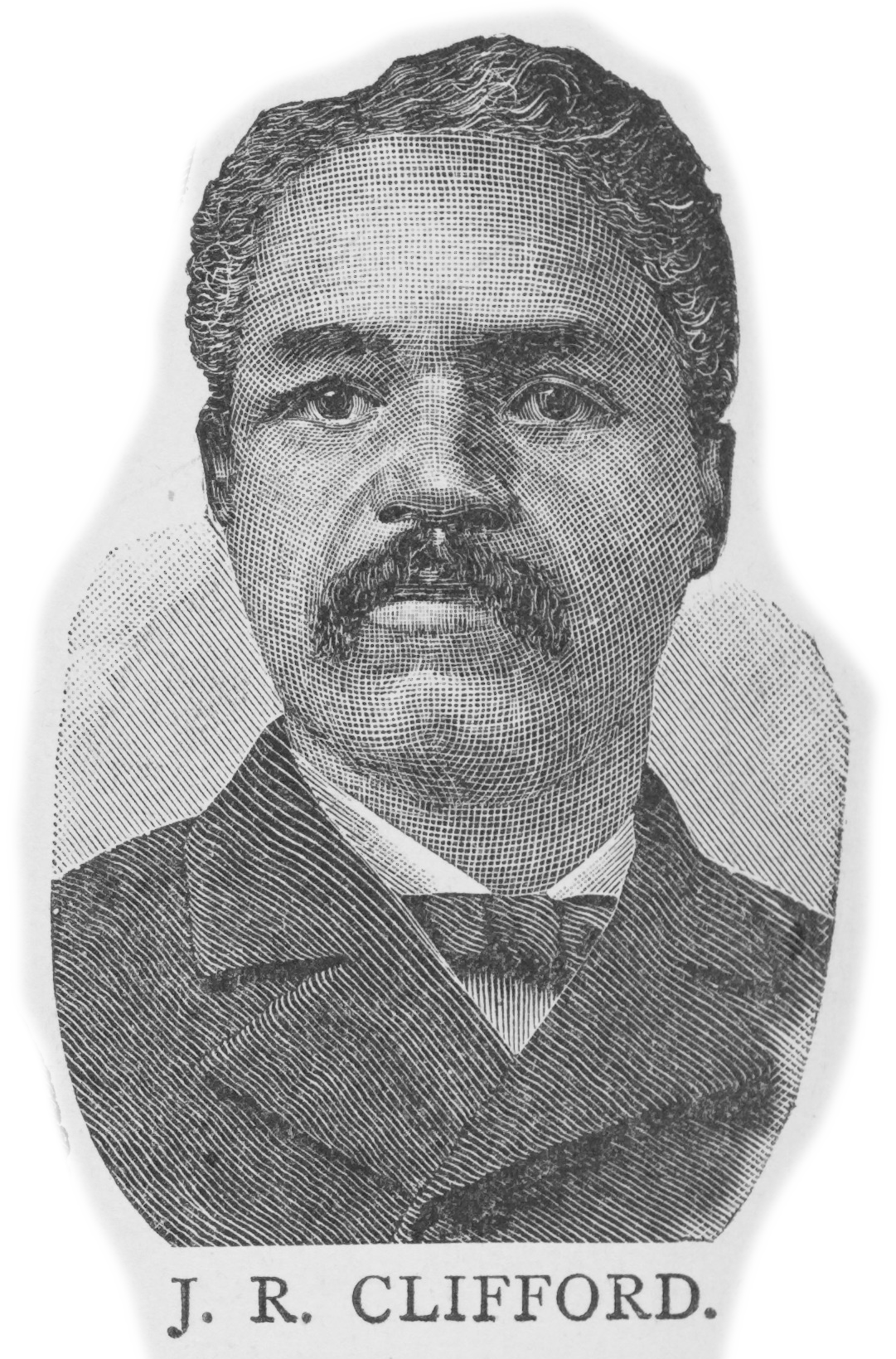
- Portrait of J. R. Clifford
- Born: September 13, 1848; Williamsport, Virginia, U.S.
- Died: October 6, 1933 (aged 85); Martinsburg, West Virginia, U.S.
- Occupations: Attorney; publisher; editor; writer; teacher; principal
- Writing career
- Notable work: The Pioneer Press
- Movements: African-American journalism Niagara Movement; Civil Rights
- Website: www.jrclifford.org

J. R. Clifford (September 13, 1848 – October 6, 1933) was West Virginia's first African-American attorney. Clifford was also a newspaper publisher, editor and writer, school teacher, and principal. He was a Civil War veteran, grandfather, as well as a civil rights pioneer and founding member of the Niagara Movement (forerunner to the NAACP). Despite boundaries derived from racial discrimination, Clifford's accomplishments were great, reflecting his ability and determination.

== Biography ==
John Robert ("J. R.") Clifford was born September 13, 1848, in the small town of Williamsport, in what was then Hardy County, Virginia (now in Grant County), near present-day Moorefield. Clifford's parents Isaac and Mary Clifford and grandparents were "free blacks," who had lived in that region of Virginia for several generations. There were no schools for colored children in the area. Clifford's parents sent him to Chicago to attend school, sometime in the early 1860s to be educated by J. J. Healy.

In 1864, at the age of fifteen, Clifford enlisted in the United States Colored Troops, and served in Company F, 13th Regiment of Heavy Artillery, United States Colored Troops until 1865, having reached the rank of Corporal. At the end of the war, he served as a nurse.

After the Civil War, Clifford learned the barber trade. He moved from Chicago to Zeno, Ohio where his uncle dwelt and attended writing school. In 1870 he went to Wheeling, West Virginia and operated a writing school, and from 1871 to 1873 he ran a similar school in Martin's Ferry, Ohio. In the early 1870s he enrolled in Harpers Ferry's newly formed Storer College, created to educate the region's African-American population. After earning his degree in 1878, Clifford became a teacher at, and then the principal of, a segregated public school for African Americans in Martinsburg, West Virginia. In Martinsburg, he studied law under J. Nelson Wirner and was a successful lawyer.

In 1882, Clifford began to publish The Pioneer Press, a newspaper that was distributed nationally to a largely African American audience. In 1884, he was elected delegate to the Republican National Convention, but several delegations withdrew their votes on account of his race. This group was led by a congressional nominee named Flick. Clifford's opposition to Flick in the Pioneer Press played a key role in Flick's defeat in that election. He published the newspaper until 1917; it was the longest-running weekly newspaper dedicated to African American issues during that time period. In 1884, Clifford was honorary commissioner of the colored department of the World Cotton Centennial, the world's fair held in New Orleans that year. In 1887, Clifford became the first African American attorney admitted to the West Virginia State Bar. He practiced law for forty-five years and was active in both state and national politics. Clifford was the President of the National Independent League and the first vice-president of the American Negro Academy. Clifford was among the founders of the Niagara Movement, with other prominent African-American civil rights leaders such as W. E. B. Du Bois. In 1906, the Niagara Movement's first American meeting occurred in Harpers Ferry, West Virginia. The Niagara Movement led to the formation of the NAACP a few years later and is considered to be the cornerstone of the modern Civil Rights Movement.

== Family and later life ==
On December 28, 1876, in Harpers Ferry, West Virginia, J. R. Clifford married seventeen-year-old Mary Elizabeth Franklin, a native of Lexington, Virginia; they would have ten children.

In 1933, Clifford died at the age of 85 in Martinsburg, West Virginia. His remains are buried at Arlington National Cemetery.

J.R. Clifford was nearly forgotten to history until he was rediscovered by Dr. Connie Park Rice, the preeminent African American Historian, of West Virginia University. Dr. Rice's article "Don't Flinch Nor Yield An Inch" recounts the complete history of J. R. Clifford.

== Williams v. Board of Education ==
In 1898, Clifford won a landmark civil rights and education case before the West Virginia Supreme Court of Appeals. In Williams v. Board of Education, Clifford argued against the Tucker County Board of Education's decision to shorten the school year for African-American school children from nine months to five months, keeping a full term for white students. Mrs. Carrie Williams, the colored school's teacher, approached Clifford. He encouraged her to continue teaching for the full nine months, regardless of funding. Clifford then filed a lawsuit against the school board for Williams' back pay. Clifford won the case at a jury trial and then won again before the West Virginia Supreme Court of Appeals. The Court's decision bolstered equal educational rights for African-American students statewide.

Clifford's victory in the Williams case occurred more than fifty years before the landmark "Brown v. Board of Education" case and was one of the few civil rights victories in a southern state's high court before the turn of the 20th century. The J. R. Clifford Project, an organization dedicated to preserving Clifford's legacy and researching his life, presents re-enactments of this trial.

From Williams v. Board of Education of Fairfax District, 45 W.Va. 199, 31 SE 985 (1898):

"Counsel insist that the colored pupils, having been allotted their pro rata share of the school funds, have no right to complain. The law guaranteed them eight months of school, and, though it cost many times in proportion what the white schools cost, they should have it. Money values should not be set off against moral and intellectual improvement. A nation that depends on its wealth is a depraved nation, while moral purity and intellectual progress alone can preserve the integrity of free institutions, and the love of true liberty, under the protection of equal laws, in the hearts of the people."

The court also said:

"Discrimination against the colored people, because of color alone, as to privileges, immunities, and equal legal protection, is contrary to public policy and the law of the land. If any discrimination as to education should be made, it should be favorable to, and not against, the colored people. Held in the bondage of slavery, and continued in a low moral and intellectual condition, for a long period of years, and then clothed at once, without preparation, with full citizenship, in this great republic, and the power to control and guide its destinies, the future welfare, prosperity and peace of our people demand that this benighted race should be elevated by education, both morally and intellectually, and that they may become exemplary citizens; otherwise the perpetuity of our free institutions may be greatly endangered."

Clifford sued because the school board provided eight months of school for white children but only five months for "colored" children. A teacher whose name is not mentioned continued teaching and sued for the salary for the three months. Clifford won for her the salary, totaling $121.00.

== Niagara Movement ==
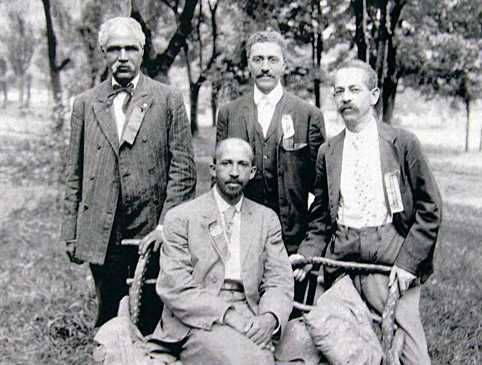
Niagara Movement leaders W. E. B. Du Bois (seated), and (left to right) J. R. Clifford, Lafayette M. Hershaw, and Freeman H. M. Murray at Harpers Ferry.

Clifford was one of the founding members of the Niagara Movement, which was organized and led by W. E. B. Du Bois and William Monroe Trotter. The Niagara Movement opposed what its members believed were policies of accommodation and conciliation promoted by African-American leaders such as Booker T. Washington. The Niagara Movement called for full civil rights for black Americans and an end to legalized segregation, and is recognized as the cornerstone of the 20th Century civil rights movement and the forerunner to the National Association for the Advancement of Colored People (NAACP).

Clifford helped organize the movement's second meeting, the first to be held on U.S. soil, in Harpers Ferry, West Virginia, the site of abolitionist John Brown's 1859 raid. The three-day gathering, from August 15 to 18, 1906, took place at the campus of Clifford's alma mater Storer College (now part of Harpers Ferry National Historical Park). Convention attendees discussed how to secure civil rights for African Americans, and the meeting was later described by Du Bois as "one of the greatest meetings that American Negroes ever held." Attendees walked from Storer College to the nearby Murphy Family farm, the relocation site of the historic fort where John Brown's quest to end slavery reached its bloody climax. Once there, they removed their shoes and socks to honor the hallowed ground and participated in a ceremony of remembrance.

Clifford broke with the Niagara Movement when it formed the NAACP in 1909. Among other disagreements, he objected to the use of the word "colored" in the organization's title.

In 2006, the Niagara Movement's Centennial was celebrated by the National Park Service at Harpers Ferry. The J. R. Clifford Project performed the "J. R. Clifford and the Carrie Williams Case" re-enactment program at the event.

== Prince Hall Masonry ==
According to the Arlington Cemetery records, John R. Clifford was a 32nd Degree Mason, a lecturer for the Most Worshipful Prince Hall Grand Lodge of West Virginia and Past Grand Master of West Virginia.

== Commemorated on the U.S. stamp ==
Clifford was among twelve pioneers of civil rights commemorated in a United States Postal Service postage stamp series in 2009.

== See also ==
- List of first minority male lawyers and judges in West Virginia
