= The Manor (West Virginia) =

Historic house in West Virginia, United States

- U.S. National Register of Historic Places
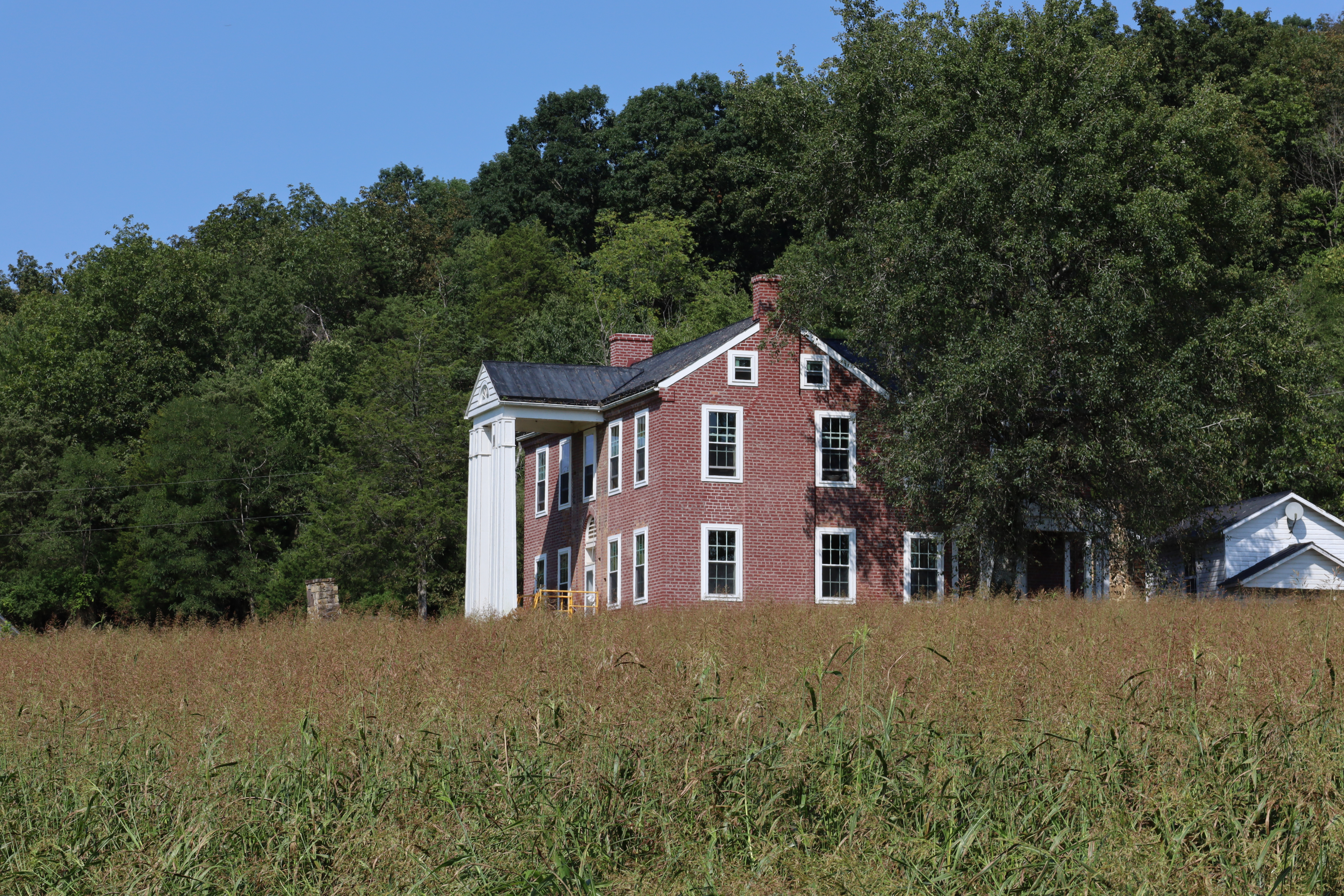

- Location within West Virginia Location within the United States
- Location: North of Petersburg off WV 42, near Petersburg, West Virginia
- Coordinates: 39°0′36″N 79°7′40″W
- Area: 5 acres (2.0 ha)
- Built: c. 1830
- Architectural style: Greek Revival
- NRHP reference No.: 75001886
- Added to NRHP: December 18, 1975

The Manor, also known as Peter and Jesse Hutton Farm, is a historic home located near Petersburg, Grant County, West Virginia. It was built about 1830, and is a 2 1/2-story, L-shaped brick dwelling in the Greek Revival style. It features a two-story portico with pediment supported by four massive square columns. Also on the property are dependencies: a kitchen, meathouse, small storage barn, and large frame barn.

It was listed on the National Register of Historic Places in 1975.
