= Old Arthur, West Virginia =

- Unincorporated community
- Location within West Virginia Location within the United States
- Coordinates: 39°5′51″N 79°6′10″W
- Country: United States
- State: West Virginia
- County: Grant
- Time zone: UTC-5 (Eastern (EST))
  - Summer (DST): UTC-4 (EDT)
- GNIS feature ID: 1544346

Old Arthur is an unincorporated community in Grant County, West Virginia, United States. Old Arthur lies along West Virginia Secondary Route 5.
