= Maysville, West Virginia =

- Unincorporated community
- Location within West Virginia Location within the United States
- Coordinates: 39°6′54″N 79°9′53″W
- Country: United States
- State: West Virginia
- County: Grant
- Time zone: UTC-5 (Eastern (EST))
  - Summer (DST): UTC-4 (EDT)
- ZIP code: 26833
- Area codes: 304 and 681
- GNIS feature ID: 1555073

The original county seat of Grant County, Maysville is an unincorporated community on North Fork Lunice Creek in Grant County, West Virginia, United States. The community lies at the eastern approach of Mays Gap in Knobly Mountain along West Virginia Route 42.

The community's name is derived from the local Mays or Mayse family.
