= Williamsport, West Virginia =

- Unincorporated community
- Location within West Virginia Location within the United States
- Coordinates: 39°12′05″N 79°01′41″W
- Country: United States
- State: West Virginia
- County: Grant
- Elevation: 1,024 ft (312 m)
- Time zone: UTC-5 (Eastern (EST))
  - Summer (DST): UTC-4 (EDT)
- GNIS feature ID: 1549990

Williamsport is an unincorporated community on Patterson Creek in Grant County, West Virginia, United States. Williamsport is the birthplace of J. R. Clifford (1848–1933), West Virginia's first African-American attorney.

Joseph V. Williams, an early postmaster, gave the community his name.

== Notable residents ==
- J. R. Clifford, who became West Virginia's first African-American attorney
