= Wilsonia, West Virginia =

- Unincorporated community
- Location within West Virginia Location within the United States
- Coordinates: 39°12′22″N 79°26′58″W
- Country: United States
- State: West Virginia
- County: Grant
- Elevation: 2,743 ft (836 m)
- Time zone: UTC-5 (Eastern (EST))
  - Summer (DST): UTC-4 (EDT)
- GNIS feature ID: 1556001

Wilsonia is an unincorporated community on the North Branch Potomac River in Grant County, West Virginia, United States. Wilsonia originated as a railroad stop on the Western Maryland Railroad in northwestern Grant County. It lies off West Virginia Route 90.

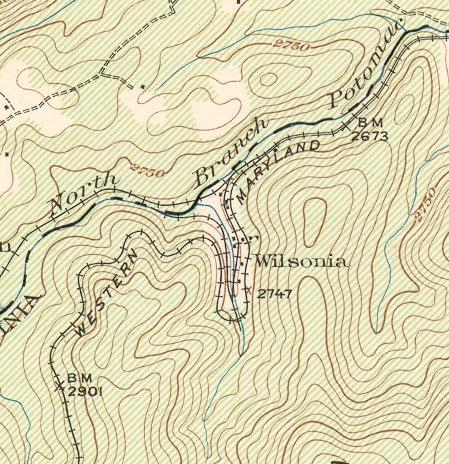
Wilsonia on a 1921 USGS topographical map.
