= Hopeville, West Virginia =

- Unincorporated community
- Location within West Virginia Location within the United States
- Coordinates: 38°58′2″N 79°17′12″W
- Country: United States
- State: West Virginia
- County: Grant
- Time zone: UTC-5 (Eastern (EST))
  - Summer (DST): UTC-4 (EDT)
- GNIS feature ID: 1554739

Hopeville is an unincorporated community on the North Fork South Branch Potomac River in Grant County, West Virginia, United States. Hopeville lies within the Spruce Knob–Seneca Rocks National Recreation Area of the Monongahela National Forest. It formerly had its own school and post office in operation until the middle of the 20th century.
