= West Virginia Archives and History =

State agency preserving material

West Virginia Archives and History is the state agency that collects and preserves materials on the state and makes them available to the public. Located in Charleston, West Virginia, this section of the Department of Arts, Culture and History oversees the West Virginia Archives and History Library, a non-lending research facility, and the West Virginia State Archives, one of the state’s most important repositories on the history of West Virginia and its residents. As of 2019, the agency held more than 16,000 linear feet of manuscripts and state government archives; 1,000,000 photographs, negatives, slides, and digital images; 76,000 books, 33,000 microfilms, 100,000 film stories and video tapes, as well as thousands of maps, state documents, and periodicals. The section currently subscribes to about six dozen West Virginia newspapers.

== History ==
Archives and History traces its roots to the West Virginia Historical and Antiquarian Society, a quasi-public organization that maintained a library and museum in the state capitol and collected books, artifacts, and other materials for a 15-year period beginning in 1890. In 1905, the State of West Virginia created the Bureau of Archives and History, with the legislative act providing that all materials acquired by the antiquarian society with state funds be transferred to the new state agency. The legislation also created the appointive position of state historian and archivist to oversee it, and the governor appointed Virgil A. Lewis to the position starting June 1, 1905. Lewis, an author and historian, had played an integral role in the creation of both the antiquarian society and Archives and History. Lewis, who headed Archives and History from 1905 until his death in 1912, was the most important state historian and archivist in the agency’s first seventy-five years. He oversaw the move of materials from the antiquarian society quarters in the capitol building (then located on Capitol Street) to the capitol annex, which had been recently constructed across the street. At the direction of the Board of Public Works, Lewis also moved some materials from the State Law Library and elsewhere in the capitol. This removal of historical materials from the capitol would prove fortuitous when the capitol burned in 1921. Among the numerous items thus saved from future destruction were records of the antebellum sessions of the Virginia Court of Appeals at Lewisburg. In addition, Lewis was responsible for the agency’s acquisition of Granville Davisson Hall’s records of the Wheeling conventions responsible for the establishment of the State of West Virginia in 1863 and the Civil War records held by West Virginia Adjutant General’s Office.

The Archives and History Library, State Archives, and State Museum moved to the new state capitol, located in the east end of Charleston, in 1929. In 1976, the agency moved once again, to the Culture Center, which had recently been constructed, in part, to alleviate the overcrowded quarters which Archives and History had available for its use in the capitol building. With additional storage space, Archives and History collections grew almost nine-fold in six years, including the addition of the Boyd B. Stutler Collection of John Brown and Civil War material. Archives and History also was able to request return of state agency records stored at another facility. More recently, the State Archives has acquired county and circuit court records from several West Virginia counties.

Long a department within state government, Archives and History was made part of the newly formed Department of Culture and History in 1977, and the State Museum was moved to a different section within Culture and History in 1989. As part of the legislation creating the Department of Culture and History, the state historian and archivist was made a member of the state records management and preservation advisory committee and agencies were barred from destroying or disposing of records with the approval of both the records administrator and the state historian and archivist.

== Programs ==
In addition to the library and archives, West Virginia Archives and History administers several other programs. Unclaimed West Virginia Union Civil War medals were part of the Adjutant General’s materials transferred to Archives and History, which distributes them to proven descendants. Since 1967, the section has managed the highway historical marker program, which was begun in 1934. Archives and History also has maintained the West Virginia Veterans Memorial Archives since 1997. The state historian and archivist serves as staff for the Records Management and Preservation Board (RMPB), created in 2000 to establish programs for the management and preservation of the counties’ public records. Through the RMPB, grants are awarded to county commissions and a statewide county records preservation project has digitized thousands of pages of deed records. Archives and History also oversees the annual West Virginia History Bowl competition of 8th-grade students around the state and annual West Virginia History Day, which features historical organization displays at the capitol and recognition of local society’s history heroes.

== Select collections ==
- Gaston Caperton collection
- Joe Manchin collection
- Jennings Randolph collection
- Earl Ray Tomblin collection
- Cecil H. Underwood first term collection and second term papers
- USS West Virginia
- Wheeling-Pittsburgh Steel collection
- Bob Wise papers
