= Grant County Courthouse (West Virginia) =

- U.S. National Register of Historic Places
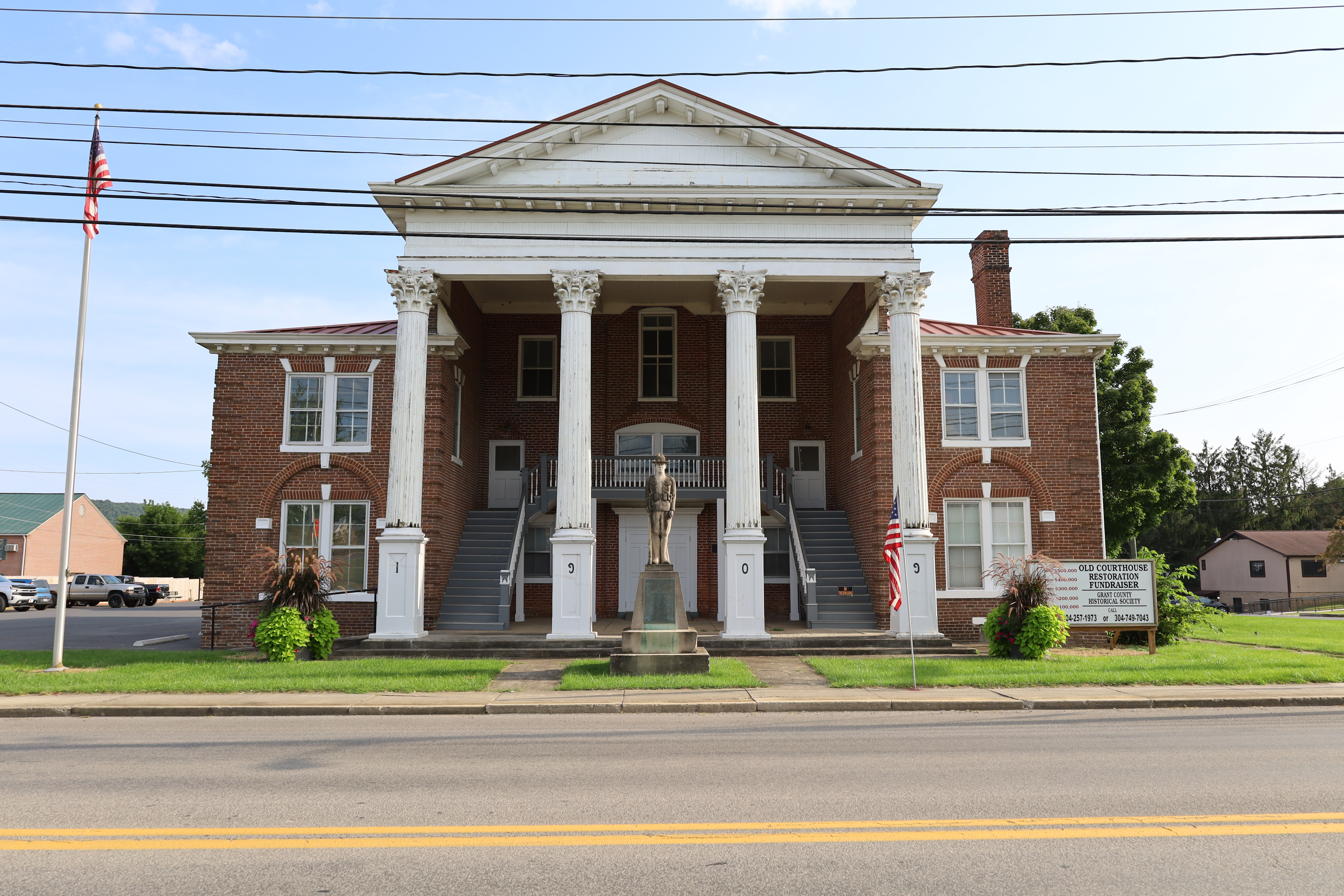

- Location within West Virginia Location within the United States
- Interactive map showing the location of Grant County Courthouse
- Location: Virginia Avenue, Petersburg, West Virginia
- Coordinates: 38°59′34″N 79°7′16″W
- Area: 0.5 acres (0.20 ha)
- Built: 1879
- Architect: George F. Sansbury
- Architectural style: Colonial Revival, Classical Revival
- MPS: South Branch Valley MRA (AD)
- NRHP reference No.: 79003306
- Added to NRHP: October 26, 1979

Grant County Courthouse, also known as the Old Grant County Courthouse, is a historic county courthouse located at Petersburg, serving Grant County, West Virginia. The original section was built in 1878–79 and expanded in 1909. It is composed of 3 two-story brick rectangles consisting of a large center section with lower and narrower wings. The building is styled with Neo-Colonial design features. The center section features a two-story projecting portico with pediment and supported by four Corinthian order fluted columns.

It was listed on the National Register of Historic Places in 1979.
