= Lahmansville, West Virginia =

- Unincorporated community
- Location within West Virginia Location within the United States
- Coordinates: 39°7′41″N 79°4′54″W
- Country: United States
- State: West Virginia
- County: Grant
- Time zone: UTC-5 (Eastern (EST))
  - Summer (DST): UTC-4 (EDT)

Lahmansville is an unincorporated community on Patterson Creek in Grant County, West Virginia, United States, located along West Virginia Secondary Route 5 at its junction with Secondary Route 5/6.

The community was named after Jacob "Jake" Lahman, a local merchant. According to the Geographic Names Information System, it has also been known as "Laymensville", "Lehmansville" and "Leymansville".
