= Gormania, West Virginia =

Unincorporated community in West Virginia, United States

- Unincorporated community
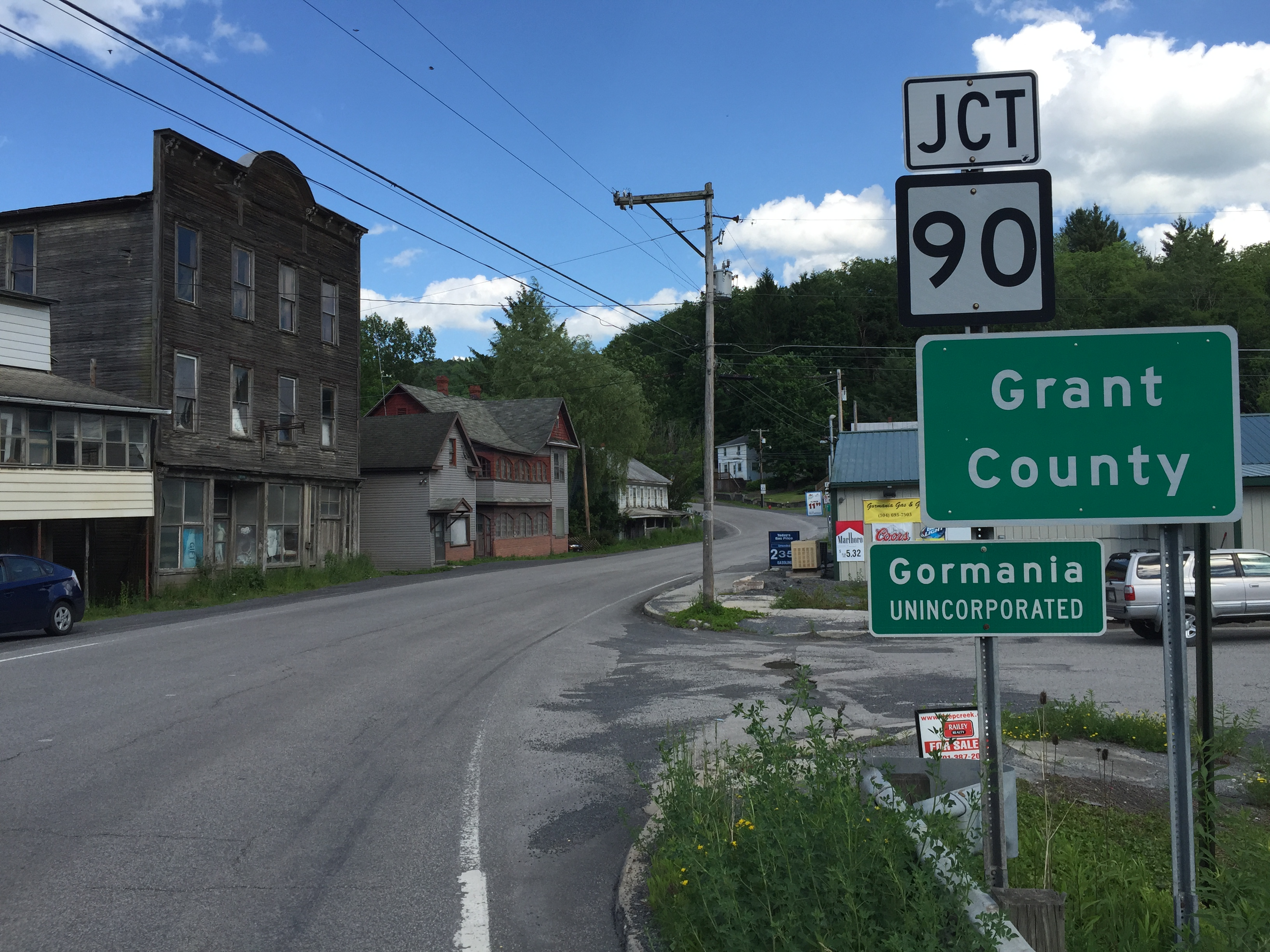
- Entering Gormania along eastbound US 50

- Location within West Virginia Location within the United States
- Coordinates: 39°17′34″N 79°20′40″W
- Country: United States
- State: West Virginia
- County: Grant
- Elevation: 2,333 ft (711 m)
- Time zone: UTC-5 (Eastern (EST))
  - Summer (DST): UTC-4 (EDT)
- ZIP codes: 26720
- GNISfeature ID: 1554585

Gormania is an unincorporated community along the North Branch Potomac River in Grant County, West Virginia. Gormania lies on the Northwestern Turnpike (US 50), which crosses the North Branch into Gorman, Maryland via Gormania Bridge. It is named for United States Senator from Maryland, Arthur P. Gorman (March 11, 1839 – June 4, 1906). Gormania is home to a few businesses; these include Gormania Garage, a United States Post Office, and the Gormania Gas & Go, which is a staple for the local economy. Gormania is the West Virginia side of an unincorporated town called Gorman, in Maryland. These two towns are named after the same man, Arther P. Gorman. While Gorman does have a fire station, Gormania is the more industrial side of town.

== Gallery ==
Gormania, viewed from US 50 bridge, 1940s

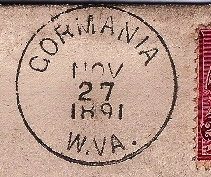
Gormania postmark
