= Petersburg, West Virginia =

City in West Virginia, US

- City
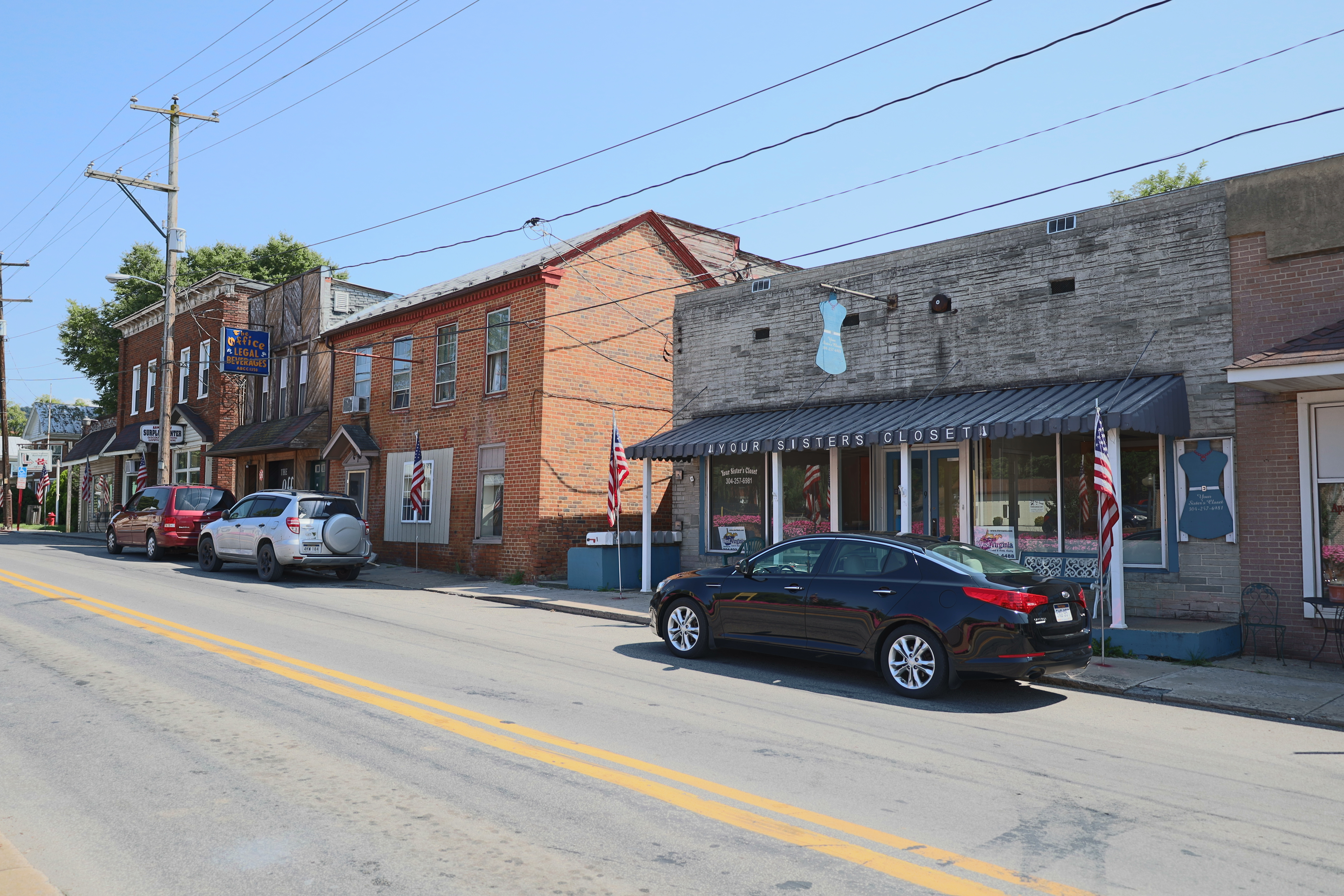
- Virginia Avenue in Petersburg

- Flag Logo
- Interactive map of Petersburg, West Virginia
- Location within West Virginia Location within the United States
- Coordinates: 39°00′04″N 79°07′40″W
- Country: United States
- State: West Virginia
- County: Grant

Area
  - Total: 1.62 sq mi (4.19 km^{2})
  - Land: 1.62 sq mi (4.19 km^{2})
  - Water: 0 sq mi (0.00 km^{2})
- Elevation: 948 ft (289 m)

Population (2020)
  - Total: 2,284
  - Estimate (2021): 2,253
  - Density: 1,641.7/sq mi (633.85/km^{2})
- Time zone: UTC-5 (Eastern (EST))
  - Summer (DST): UTC-4 (EDT)
- ZIP code: 26847
- Area code: 304
- FIPS code: 54-62956
- GNIS feature ID: 2390635
- Website: cityofpetersburgwv.gov

Petersburg is a city in Grant County, West Virginia, United States. The population was 2,251 at the 2020 census. It is the county seat of Grant County.

== History ==
Petersburg was founded circa 1745 by Jacob Peterson, who owned the area's first merchandising store.

In the 1830 United States census, the population center of the United States was recorded as being about 9 miles southwest of the town.

The settlement was incorporated in 1910.

== Geography ==
According to the United States Census Bureau, the city has a total area of 1.62 square miles (4.20 km^{2}), all of it land.

=== Climate ===
The climate in this area has mild differences between highs and lows, and there is adequate rainfall year-round. According to the Köppen Climate Classification system, Petersburg has a humid subtropical climate, abbreviated "Cfa" on climate maps.

Climate data for Petersburg, West Virginia (1991–2020 normals, extremes 1994–present)
| Month | Jan | Feb | Mar | Apr | May | Jun | Jul | Aug | Sep | Oct | Nov | Dec | Year |
|---|---|---|---|---|---|---|---|---|---|---|---|---|---|
| Record high °F (°C) | 75 (24) | 78 (26) | 88 (31) | 103 (39) | 98 (37) | 100 (38) | 104 (40) | 100 (38) | 101 (38) | 89 (32) | 90 (32) | 80 (27) | 104 (40) |
| Mean daily maximum °F (°C) | 44.2 (6.8) | 47.2 (8.4) | 55.6 (13.1) | 67.7 (19.8) | 75.7 (24.3) | 84.4 (29.1) | 88.5 (31.4) | 86.3 (30.2) | 80.6 (27.0) | 68.6 (20.3) | 56.6 (13.7) | 47.4 (8.6) | 66.9 (19.4) |
| Daily mean °F (°C) | 33.7 (0.9) | 36.2 (2.3) | 43.5 (6.4) | 54.0 (12.2) | 62.8 (17.1) | 71.5 (21.9) | 75.7 (24.3) | 73.9 (23.3) | 67.3 (19.6) | 55.4 (13.0) | 44.8 (7.1) | 37.1 (2.8) | 54.7 (12.6) |
| Mean daily minimum °F (°C) | 23.3 (−4.8) | 25.3 (−3.7) | 31.4 (−0.3) | 40.2 (4.6) | 49.8 (9.9) | 58.6 (14.8) | 63.0 (17.2) | 61.5 (16.4) | 54.0 (12.2) | 42.2 (5.7) | 33.0 (0.6) | 26.9 (−2.8) | 42.4 (5.8) |
| Record low °F (°C) | −5 (−21) | −11 (−24) | −5 (−21) | 19 (−7) | 28 (−2) | 39 (4) | 46 (8) | 43 (6) | 33 (1) | 18 (−8) | 11 (−12) | −3 (−19) | −11 (−24) |
| Average precipitation inches (mm) | 2.56 (65) | 2.61 (66) | 3.50 (89) | 3.46 (88) | 4.48 (114) | 4.15 (105) | 4.50 (114) | 3.61 (92) | 3.34 (85) | 2.72 (69) | 2.46 (62) | 2.93 (74) | 40.32 (1,024) |
Source: NOAA

== Demographics ==
Historical population
| Census | Pop. | Note | %± |
|---|---|---|---|
| 1880 | 268 | | — |
| 1920 | 834 | | — |
| 1930 | 1,410 | | 69.1% |
| 1940 | 1,751 | | 24.2% |
| 1950 | 1,898 | | 8.4% |
| 1960 | 2,079 | | 9.5% |
| 1970 | 2,177 | | 4.7% |
| 1980 | 2,084 | | −4.3% |
| 1990 | 2,360 | | 13.2% |
| 2000 | 2,423 | | 2.7% |
| 2010 | 2,467 | | 1.8% |
| 2020 | 2,284 | | −7.4% |
| 2021 (est.) | 2,253 | | −1.4% |
U.S. Decennial Census

=== 2020 census ===
As of the 2020 census, Petersburg had a population of 2,284. The median age was 47.8 years. 17.6% of residents were under the age of 18 and 27.9% of residents were 65 years of age or older. For every 100 females there were 89.4 males, and for every 100 females age 18 and over there were 83.3 males age 18 and over.

0.0% of residents lived in urban areas, while 100.0% lived in rural areas.

There were 1,052 households in Petersburg, of which 22.2% had children under the age of 18 living in them. Of all households, 33.3% were married-couple households, 24.1% were households with a male householder and no spouse or partner present, and 35.1% were households with a female householder and no spouse or partner present. About 42.8% of all households were made up of individuals and 21.1% had someone living alone who was 65 years of age or older.

There were 1,196 housing units, of which 12.0% were vacant. The homeowner vacancy rate was 3.3% and the rental vacancy rate was 7.5%.

Racial composition as of the 2020 census
| Race | Number | Percent |
|---|---|---|
| White | 2,104 | 92.1% |
| Black or African American | 48 | 2.1% |
| American Indian and Alaska Native | 2 | 0.1% |
| Asian | 13 | 0.6% |
| Native Hawaiian and Other Pacific Islander | 0 | 0.0% |
| Some other race | 24 | 1.1% |
| Two or more races | 93 | 4.1% |
| Hispanic or Latino (of any race) | 46 | 2.0% |

=== 2010 census ===
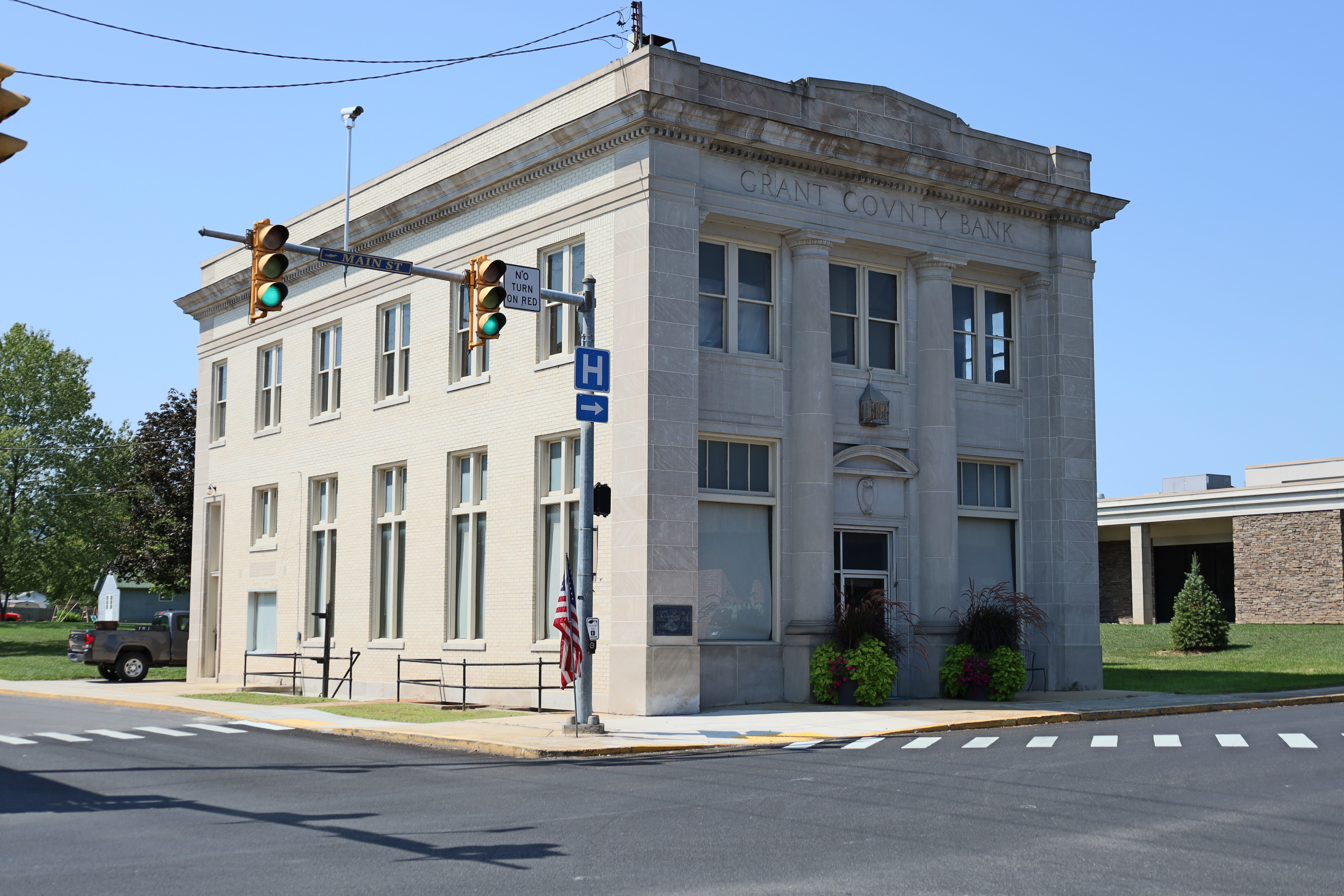
Former Grant County Bank

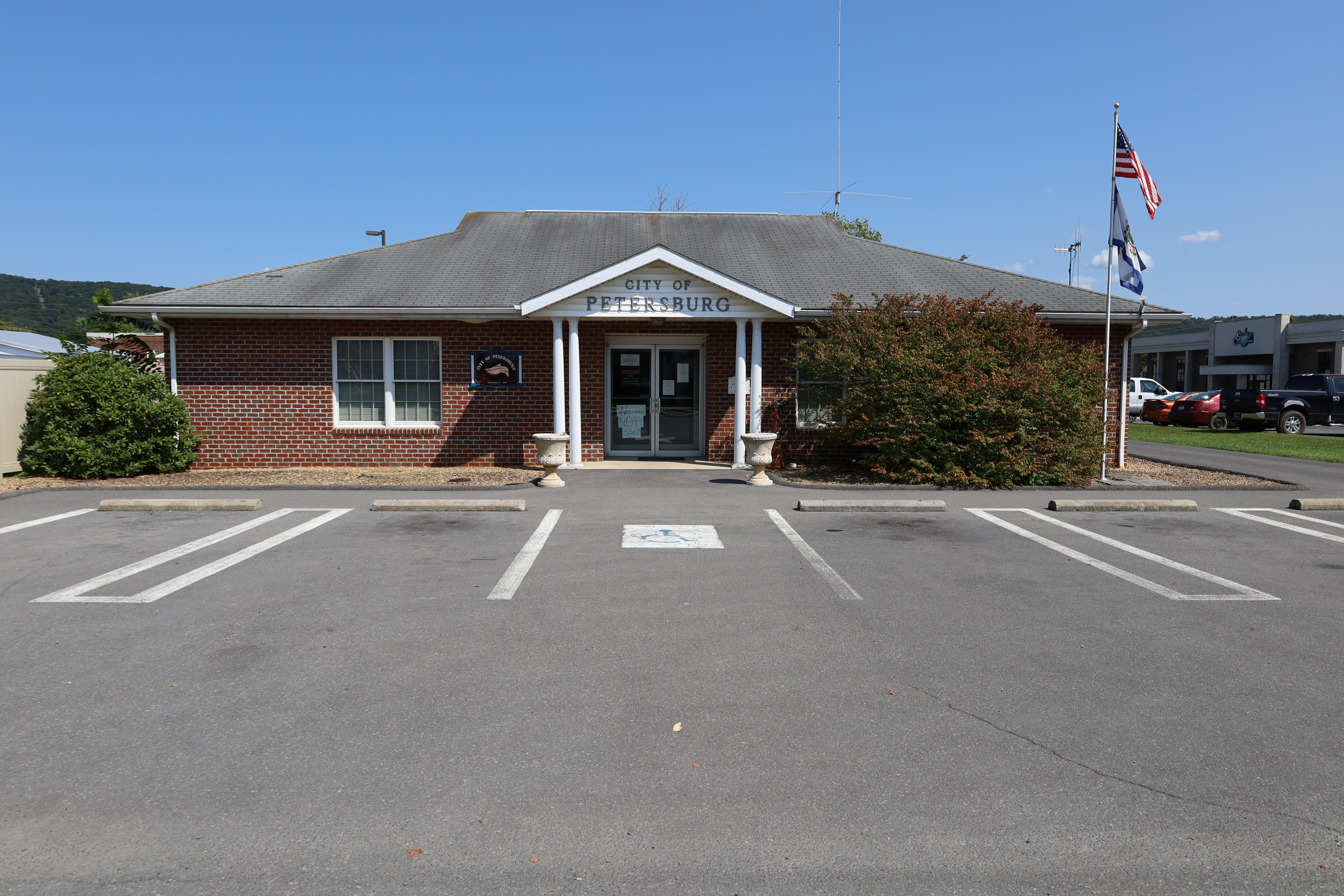
Petersburg City Hall

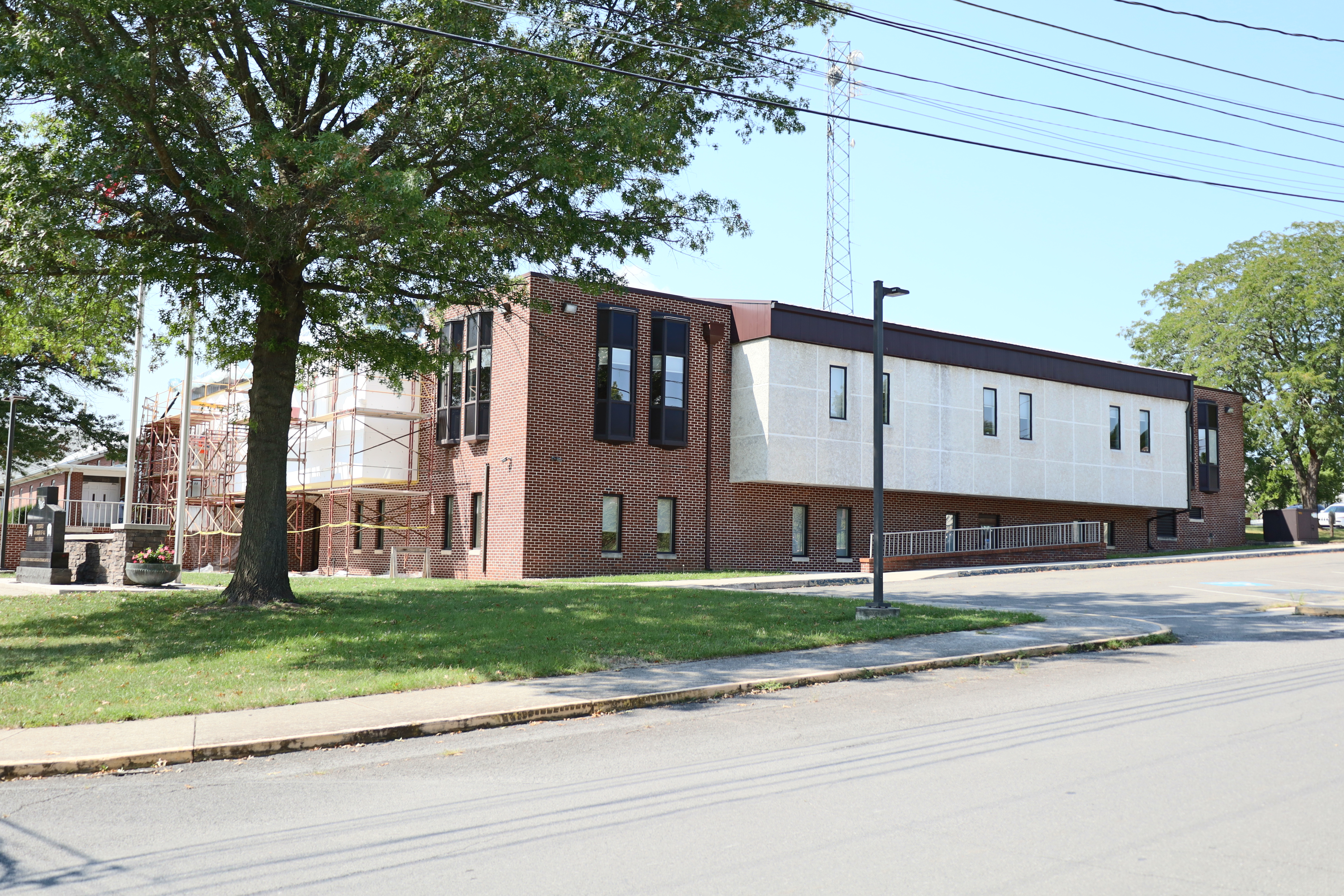
New Grant County Courthouse

As of the census of 2010, there were 2,467 people, 1,113 households, and 614 families living in the city. The population density was 1,522.8 inhabitants per square mile (588.0/km^{2}). There were 1,310 housing units at an average density of 808.6 per square mile (312.2/km^{2}). The racial makeup of the city was 94.3% White, 2.0% African American, 0.2% Native American, 0.2% Asian, 2.0% from other races, and 1.3% from two or more races. Hispanic or Latino of any race were 3.4% of the population.

There were 1,113 households, of which 24.7% had children under the age of 18 living with them, 38.6% were married couples living together, 12.1% had a female householder with no husband present, 4.4% had a male householder with no wife present, and 44.8% were non-families. 38.5% of all households were made up of individuals, and 19.7% had someone living alone who was 65 years of age or older. The average household size was 2.11 and the average family size was 2.77.

The median age in the city was 47.1 years. 19.3% of residents were under the age of 18; 8% were between the ages of 18 and 24; 20.5% were from 25 to 44; 27% were from 45 to 64; and 25.4% were 65 years of age or older. The gender makeup of the city was 46.2% male and 53.8% female.

=== 2000 census ===
As of the census of 2000, there were 2,423 people, 1,086 households, and 620 families living in the city. The population density was 1,482.6 people per square mile (573.9/km^{2}). There were 1,222 housing units at an average density of 747.7 per square mile (289.5/km^{2}). The racial makeup of the city was 97.44% White, 1.57% African American, 0.12% Native American, 0.17% Asian, 0.29% from other races, and 0.41% from two or more races. Hispanic or Latino of any race were 0.78% of the population.

There were 1,086 households, out of which 23.4% had children under the age of 18 living with them, 44.3% were married couples living together, 10.4% had a female householder with no husband present, and 42.9% were non-families. 38.0% of all households were made up of individuals, and 19.0% had someone living alone who was 65 years of age or older. The average household size was 2.10 and the average family size was 2.75.

In the city, the population was spread out, with 19.0% under the age of 18, 8.8% from 18 to 24, 23.8% from 25 to 44, 24.1% from 45 to 64, and 24.3% who were 65 years of age or older. The median age was 44 years. For every 100 females, there were 83.6 males. For every 100 females age 18 and over, there were 78.5 males.

The median income for a household in the city was $24,867, and the median income for a family was $32,941. Males had a median income of $23,654 versus $20,250 for females. The per capita income for the city was $19,642. About 11.9% of families and 17.5% of the population were below the poverty line, including 25.3% of those under age 18 and 11.2% of those age 65 or over.

== Arts and culture ==
=== Registered historic places ===
- The Manor (ca. 1830)
- Hermitage Motor Inn (ca. 1840)
- Grant County Courthouse (1878–79)
- Rohrbaugh Cabin (ca. 1880)

== Infrastructure ==
=== Transportation ===
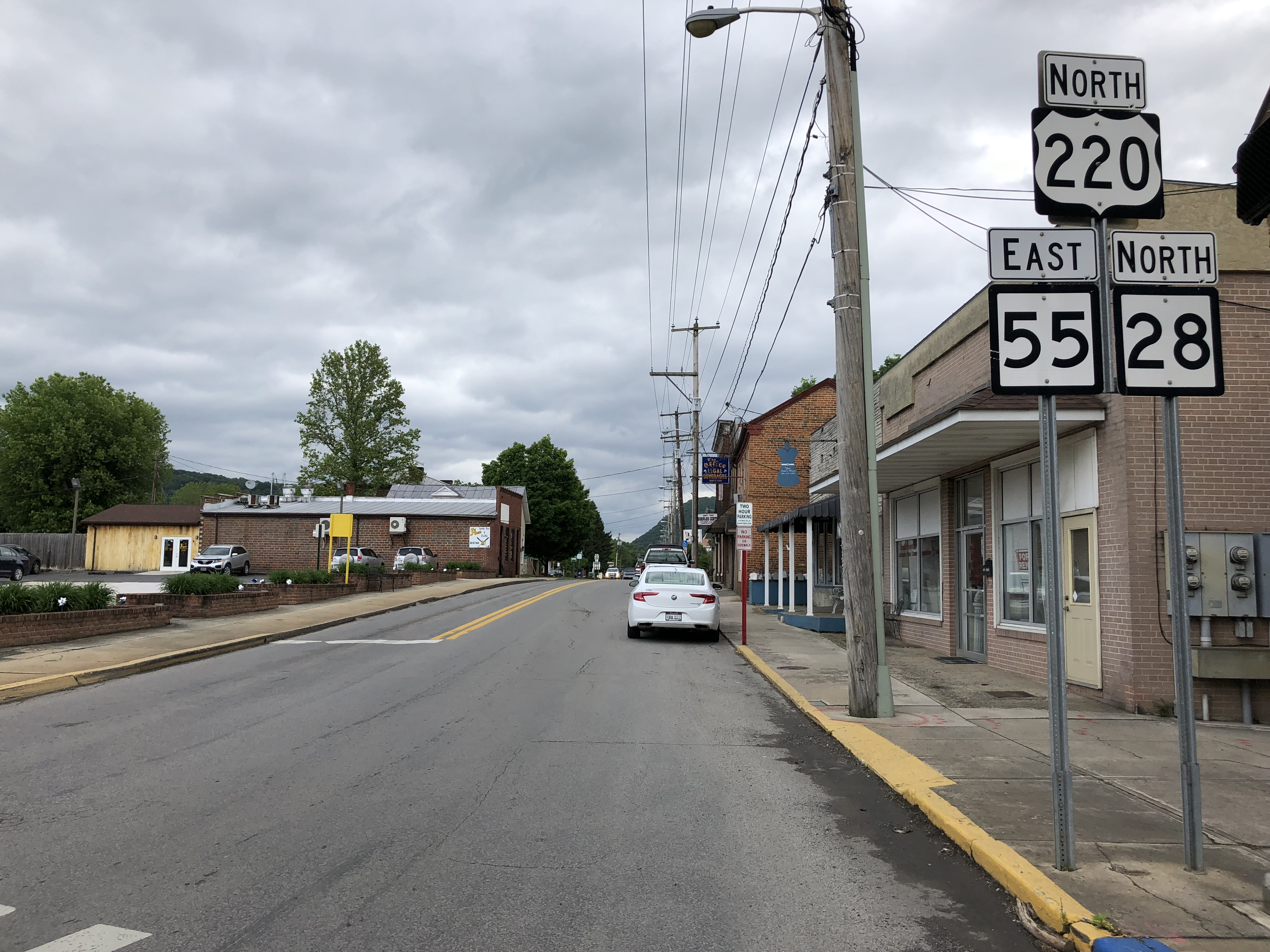
US 220, WV 28 and WV 55 heading northeast towards Moorefield from the center of Petersburg

==== Highways ====
- U.S. Route 220
- West Virginia Route 28
- West Virginia Route 55
- West Virginia Route 42

==== Public transportation ====
Potomac Valley Transit provides public transportation to Petersburg.

=== Medical care ===
Grant Memorial Hospital serves three counties in the West Virginia Panhandle.

== Notable people ==
- Joan Banks (1918–1998), prolific radio actress
- Jason Kitzmiller, NASCAR driver
- M. Blane Michael (1943–2011), Circuit Judge, United States Court of Appeals for the Fourth Circuit
- Codie Rohrbaugh, NASCAR driver
