= Grant County, West Virginia =

County in West Virginia, United States

Grant County
- County
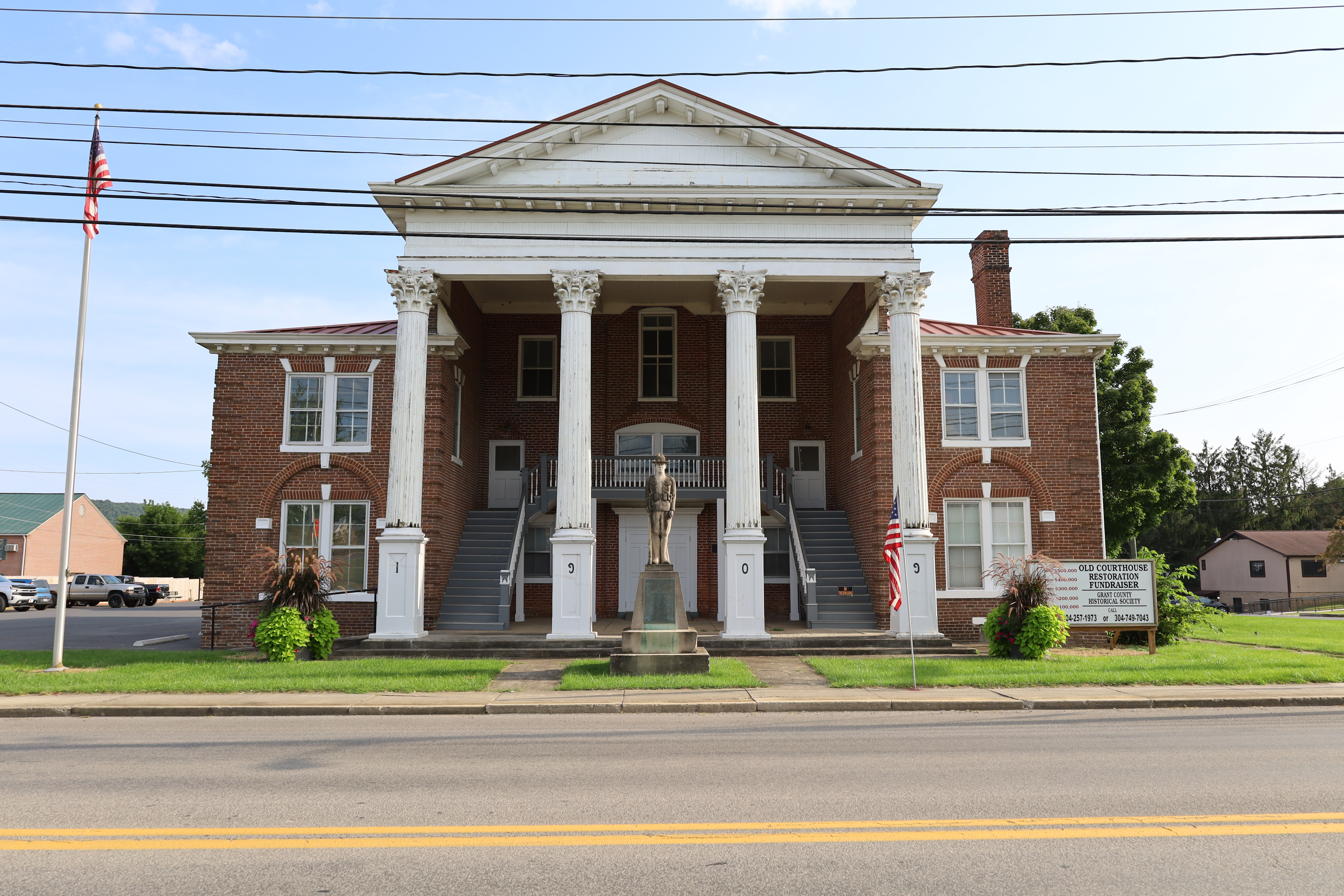
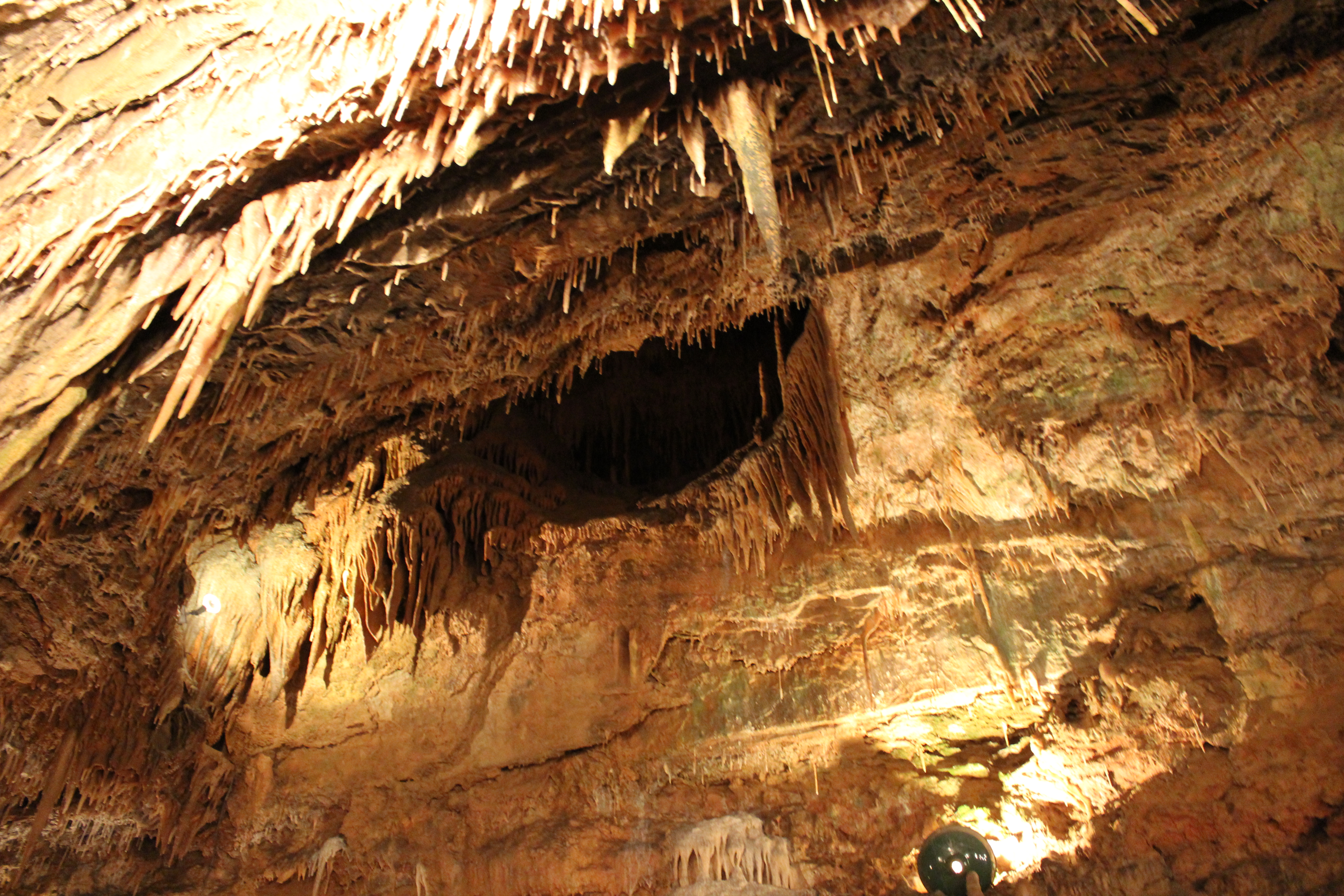
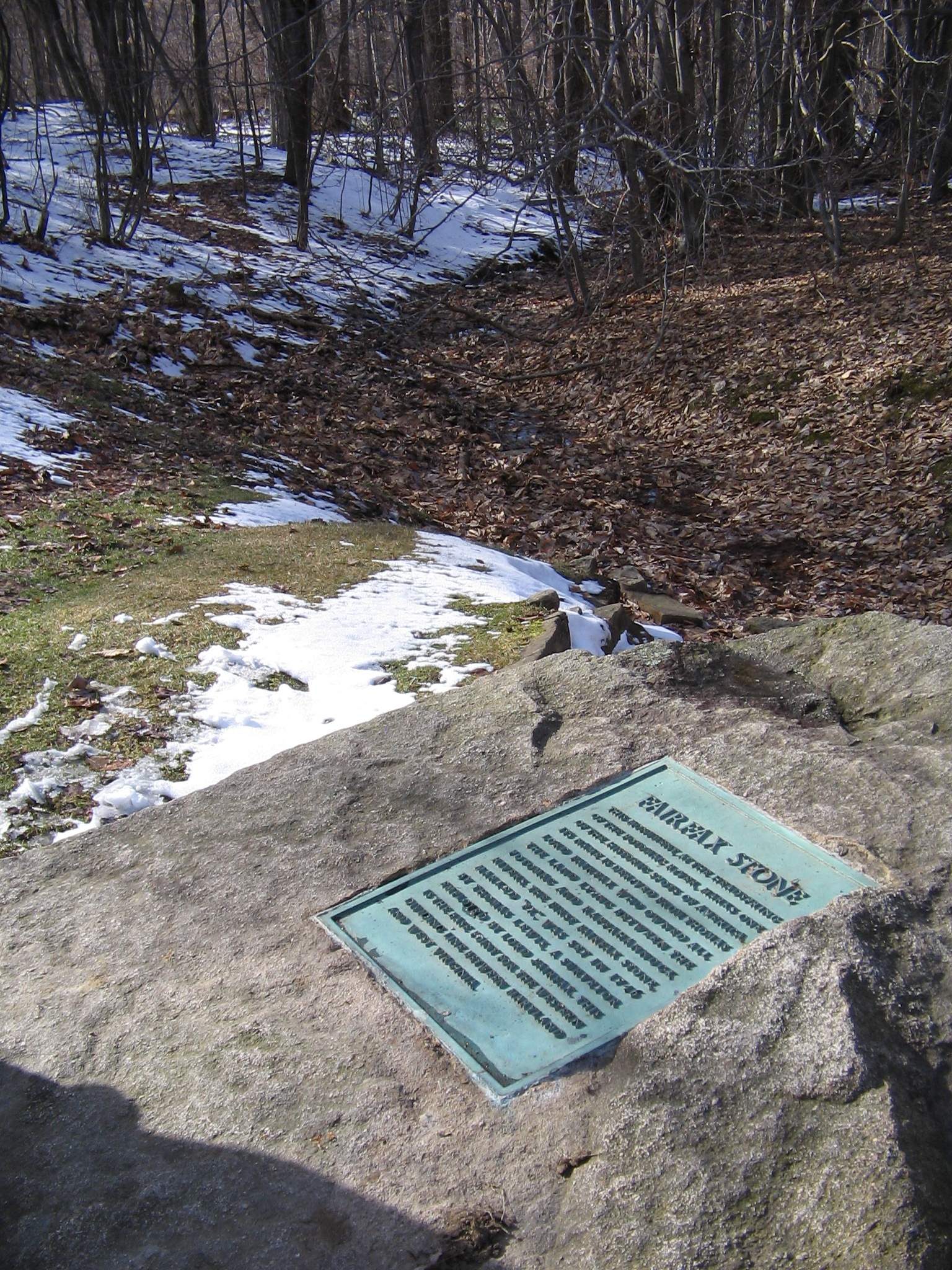
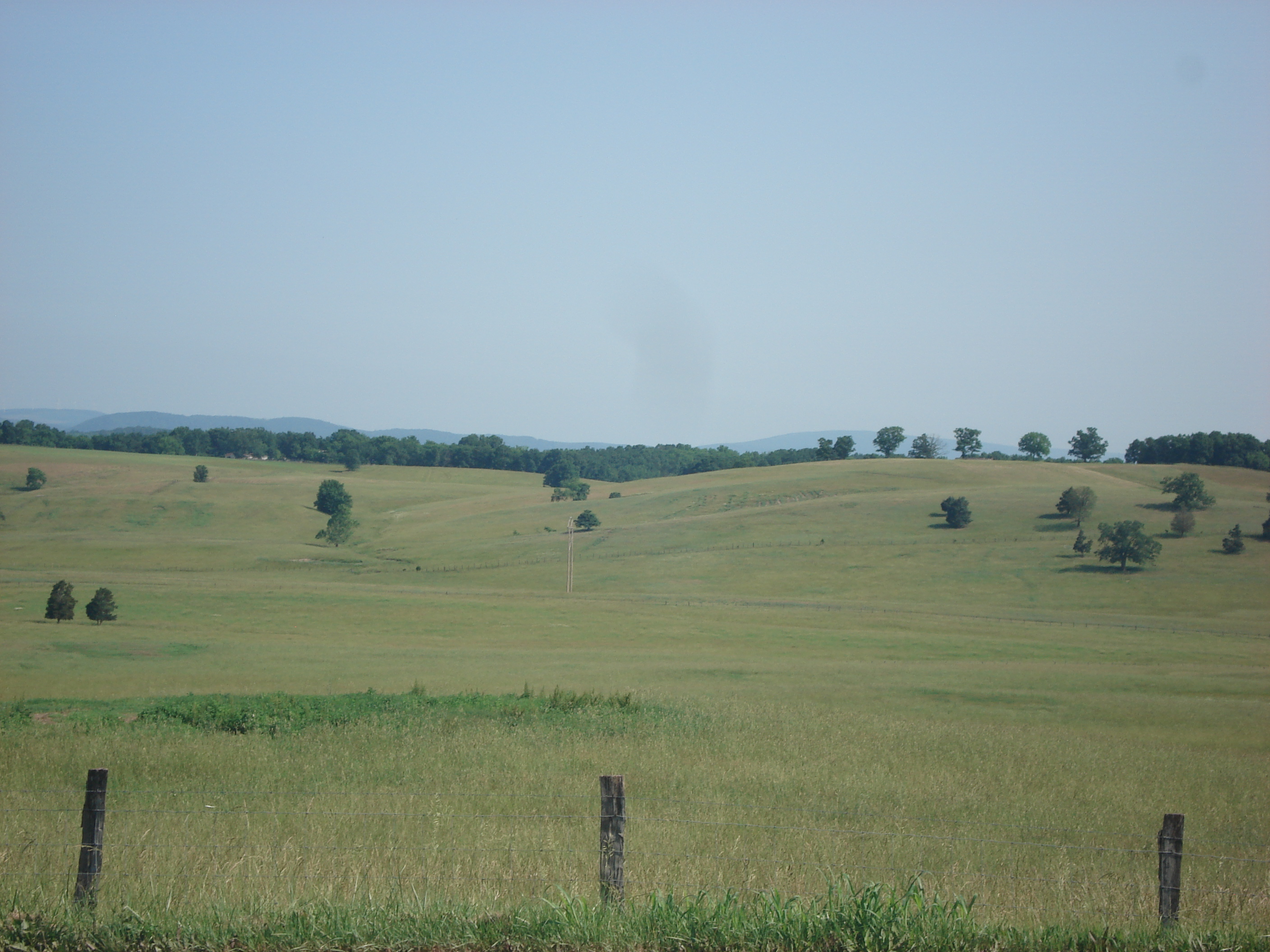
- Old Grant County Courthouse in Petersburg Smoke Hole Caverns Fairfax Stone Historical Monument State Park Rolling countryside in southern Grant County

- Seal Logo

- Location of Grant County in West Virginia

- West Virginia's location within the U.S.
- Coordinates: 39.06°N 79.12°W
- Country: United States
- State: West Virginia
- Founded: February 6, 1866
- Named for: Ulysses S. Grant
- Seat: Petersburg
- and largest city

Government
  - County Administrator: Michelle Sites
  - County Commission: Kevin P. Hagerty; Scotty Miley; Tyson Riggleman

Area
  - Total: 480 sq mi (1,200 km^{2})
  - Land: 477 sq mi (1,240 km^{2})
  - Water: 2.9 sq mi (7.5 km^{2}) 0.6%
  - Rank: 19th

Population (2020)
  - Total: 10,976
  - Estimate (2025): 11,041 ▲
  - Rank: 42nd
  - Density: 23.0/sq mi (8.88/km^{2})
- Time zone: UTC−5 (Eastern)
  - Summer (DST): UTC−4 (EDT)
- Area codes: 304, 681
- Congressional district: 2nd
- Senate district: 14th
- House of Delegates district: 85th
- Website: https://www.grantcountywv.org

Grant County is a county in the U.S. state of West Virginia. As of the 2020 census, the population was 10,976. Its county seat is Petersburg. The county was created from Hardy County in 1866 and named for Civil War General and the 18th president of the United States Ulysses S. Grant.

== History ==
The territory that became Grant County in 1866 was originally part of Hampshire County, the oldest county formed within the present boundaries of West Virginia, in 1754. In 1786, Hardy County was formed from the southern portion of Hampshire County. The county's boundaries were relatively stable from 1788 until 1866, when Grant County was formed from the western portion of Hardy. The first counties formed in the state following the admission of West Virginia to the Union were Grant and Mineral in 1866, the latter formed from the western portion of Hampshire County, and thus adjoining Grant. They were the fifty-first and fifty-second counties in West Virginia, and only Lincoln, Summers, and Mingo were created after them.

Beginning in 1863, West Virginia's counties were divided into civil townships, with the intention of encouraging local government. This proved impractical in the heavily rural state, and in 1872 the townships were converted into magisterial districts. Between its establishment and 1870, Grant County was divided into three townships: Grant, Milroy, and Union, which became magisterial districts in 1872.

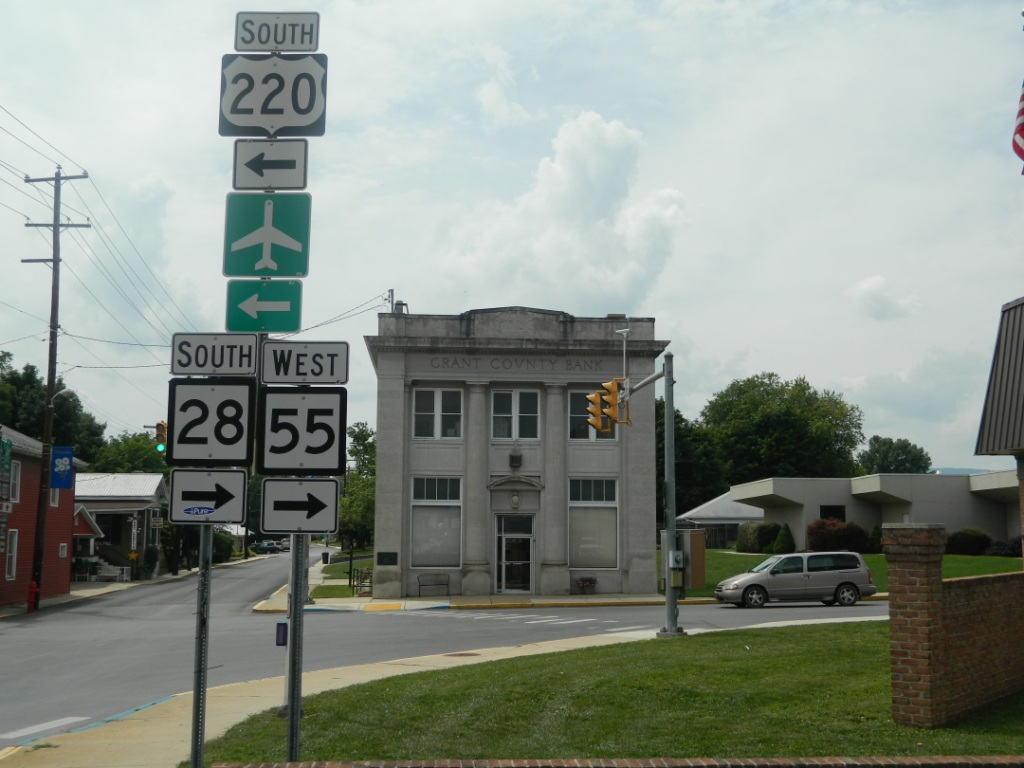
Grant County Bank, Petersburg

Most of the 47 people killed in the 1985 Election day floods were in Pendleton and Grant counties, according to the National Weather Service. At Franklin, the Pendleton County seat, the South Branch of the Potomac River crested at 22.6 feet during the incident. Flood stage in the shallow riverbed was only 7 feet.

== Geography ==
According to the United States Census Bureau, the county has a total area of 480 square miles (1,200 km^{2}), of which 477 square miles (1,240 km^{2}) is land and 2.9 square miles (7.5 km^{2}) (0.6%) is water.

=== Major highways ===
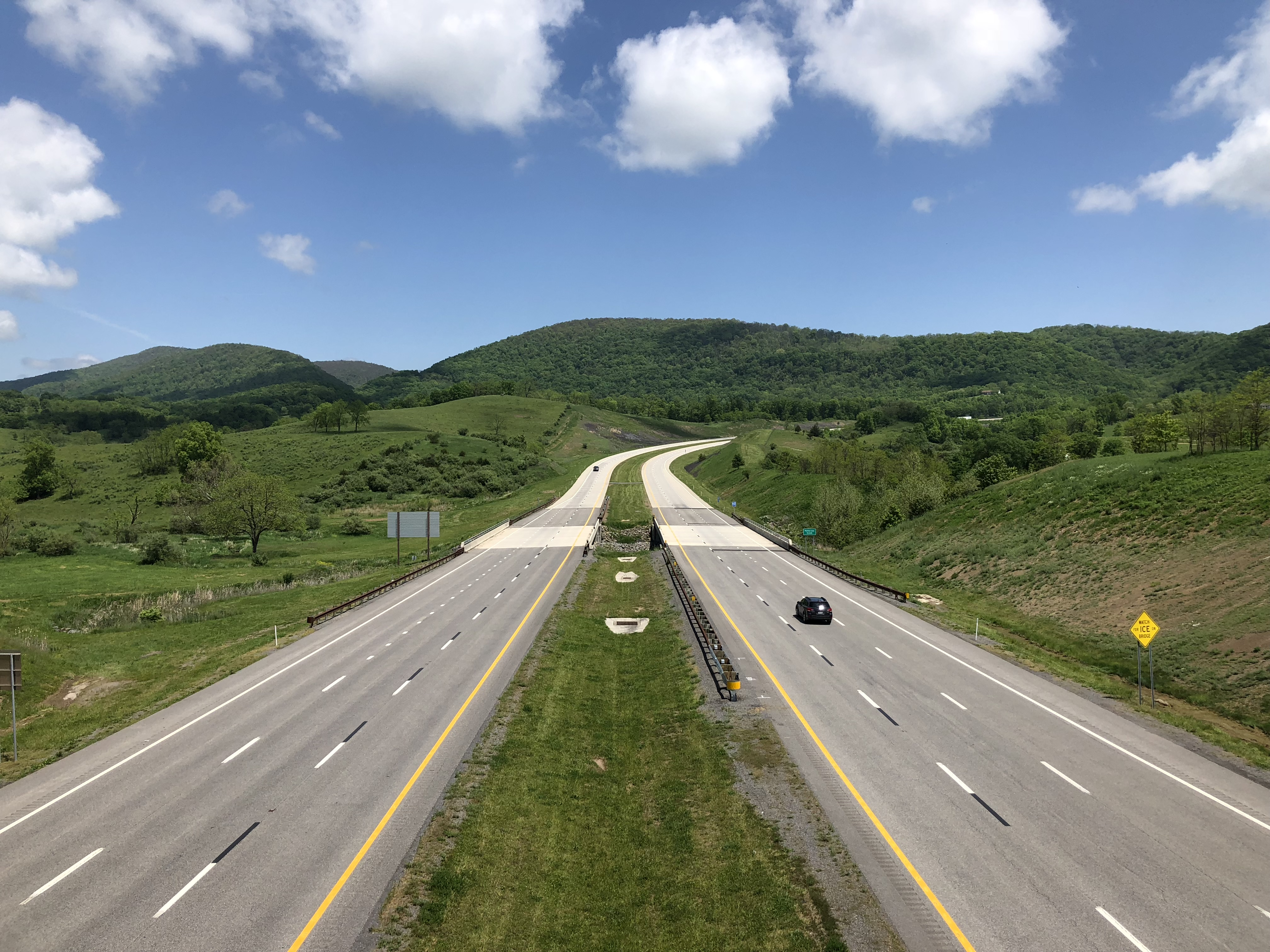
US 48 in Grant County

- U.S. Route 48
- U.S. Route 50
- U.S. Route 220
- West Virginia Route 28
- West Virginia Route 42
- West Virginia Route 55
- West Virginia Route 93

=== Adjacent counties ===
- Mineral County (northeast)
- Hardy County (east)
- Pendleton County (south)
- Randolph County (southwest)
- Tucker County (west)
- Preston County (northwest)
- Garrett County, Maryland (northwest)

=== National protected areas ===
- Monongahela National Forest (part)
- Spruce Knob–Seneca Rocks National Recreation Area (part)

== Demographics ==
Historical population
Census	Pop.	Note	%±
1870	4,467		—
1880	5,542		24.1%
1890	6,802		22.7%
1900	7,275		7.0%
1910	7,838		7.7%
1920	8,993		14.7%
1930	8,441		−6.1%
1940	8,805		4.3%
1950	8,756		−0.6%
1960	8,304		−5.2%
1970	8,607		3.6%
1980	10,210		18.6%
1990	10,428		2.1%
2000	11,299		8.4%
2010	11,937		5.6%
2020	10,976		−8.1%
2025 (est.)	11,041	▲	0.6%
U.S. Decennial Census; 1790–1960 1900–1990; 1990–2000 2010–2020

=== 2020 census ===
As of the 2020 census, the county had a population of 10,976. Of the residents, 18.7% were under the age of 18 and 24.3% were 65 years of age or older; the median age was 47.7 years. For every 100 females there were 100.9 males, and for every 100 females age 18 and over there were 98.2 males.

The racial makeup of the county was 95.6% White, 0.8% Black or African American, 0.2% American Indian and Alaska Native, 0.2% Asian, 0.5% from some other race, and 2.8% from two or more races. Hispanic or Latino residents of any race comprised 0.8% of the population.

There were 4,751 households in the county, of which 25.5% had children under the age of 18 living with them and 23.6% had a female householder with no spouse or partner present. About 30.3% of all households were made up of individuals and 15.6% had someone living alone who was 65 years of age or older.

There were 5,598 housing units, of which 15.1% were vacant. Among occupied housing units, 77.8% were owner-occupied and 22.2% were renter-occupied. The homeowner vacancy rate was 1.8% and the rental vacancy rate was 5.5%.

Grant County, West Virginia – Racial and ethnic composition Note: the US Census treats Hispanic/Latino as an ethnic category. This table excludes Latinos from the racial categories and assigns them to a separate category. Hispanics/Latinos may be of any race.
Race / Ethnicity (NH = Non-Hispanic)	Pop 2000	Pop 2010	Pop 2020	% 2000	% 2010	% 2020
White alone (NH)	11,058	11,618	10,463	97.86%	97.32%	95.32%
Black or African American alone (NH)	76	72	83	0.67%	0.60%	0.75%
Native American or Alaska Native alone (NH)	28	17	21	0.24%	0.14%	0.19%
Asian alone (NH)	16	18	24	0.14%	0.15%	0.21%
Pacific Islander alone (NH)	1	2	0	0.00%	0.01%	0.00%
Other race alone (NH)	8	4	20	0.07%	0.03%	0.18%
Mixed race or Multiracial (NH)	50	86	274	0.44%	0.72%	2.49%
Hispanic or Latino (any race)	62	120	91	0.54%	1.00%	0.82%
Total	11,299	11,937	10,976	100.00%	100.00%	100.00%

=== 2010 census ===
As of the 2010 United States census, there were 11,937 people, 4,941 households, and 3,435 families living in the county. The population density was 25.0 inhabitants per square mile (9.7/km^{2}). There were 6,366 housing units at an average density of 13.3 units per square mile (5.1 units/km^{2}). The racial makeup of the county was 97.7% white, 0.7% black or African American, 0.2% Asian, 0.2% American Indian, 0.5% from other races, and 0.9% from two or more races. Those of Hispanic or Latino origin made up 1.0% of the population. In terms of ancestry, 26.9% were German, 15.0% were American, 9.3% were Irish, and 5.3% were English.

Of the 4,941 households, 29.3% had children under the age of 18 living with them, 56.3% were married couples living together, 8.3% had a female householder with no husband present, 30.5% were non-families, and 25.7% of all households were made up of individuals. The average household size was 2.39 and the average family size was 2.84. The median age was 44.0 years.

The median income for a household in the county was $35,593 and the median income for a family was $46,193. Males had a median income of $35,000 versus $24,643 for females. The per capita income for the county was $19,358. About 10.6% of families and 12.9% of the population were below the poverty line, including 15.0% of those under age 18 and 12.8% of those age 65 or over.

=== 2000 census ===
As of the census of 2000, there were 11,299 people, 4,591 households, and 3,273 families living in the county. The population density was 24 people per square mile (9.3 people/km^{2}). There were 6,105 housing units at an average density of 13 units per square mile (5.0 units/km^{2}). The racial makeup of the county was 98.33% White, 0.67% Black or African American, 0.26% Indigenous American, 0.14% Asian, 0.02% Pacific Islander, 0.13% from other races, and 0.45% from two or more races. 0.55% of the population were Hispanic or Latino of any race.

There were 4,591 households, out of which 30.20% had children under the age of 18 living with them, 59.50% were married couples living together, 8.20% had a female householder with no husband present, and 28.70% were non-families. 24.50% of all households were made up of individuals, and 11.30% had someone living alone who was 65 years of age or older. The average household size was 2.43 and the average family size was 2.87.

In the county, the population was spread out, with 22.70% under the age of 18, 7.80% from 18 to 24, 27.50% from 25 to 44, 26.80% from 45 to 64, and 15.30% who were 65 years of age or older. The median age was 39 years. For every 100 females there were 97.70 males. For every 100 females age 18 and over, there were 94.50 males.

The median income for a household in the county was $28,916, and the median income for a family was $33,813. Males had a median income of $24,796 versus $18,354 for females. The per capita income for the county was $15,696. About 12.60% of families and 16.30% of the population were below the poverty line, including 21.00% of those under age 18 and 18.70% of those age 65 or over.

== Communities ==
=== City ===
- Petersburg (county seat)

=== Town ===
- Bayard

=== Magisterial districts ===
- Grant
- Milroy
- Union

=== Unincorporated communities ===
- Arthur
- Bismarck
- Cabins
- Dobbin
- Dorcas
- Fairfax
- Forman
- Gormania
- Greenland
- Henry
- Hopeville
- Lahmansville
- Maysville
- Medley
- Mount Storm
- Old Arthur
- Scherr
- Williamsport
- Wilsonia

== Politics and government ==
=== Federal politics ===
Grant County lies within West Virginia's 2nd congressional district. The current representative of the district is Riley Moore (R).

Politically, Grant County was historically a major outlier in West Virginia. While the rest of the state did not become a Republican bastion until the 21st century after having leaned heavily Democratic between the New Deal and Bill Clinton’s presidency, Grant County has always been among the most strongly Republican counties in the country. Since Grant County was created in 1866, no Democrat has managed to receive 40 percent of the county's vote in any Presidential election. The only Republican to ever lose Grant County has been William Howard Taft in 1912 when the GOP was divided and Progressive Theodore Roosevelt claimed the majority of the county's vote.

The county's Republican bent has held even in national Democratic landslides. Franklin D. Roosevelt never tallied more than 26.8 percent of the vote in any of his four successful campaigns, and Lyndon B. Johnson only managed 37.8 percent in 1964. Jimmy Carter is the only other Democrat besides LBJ to have cracked the 30 percent barrier.

Notably, in 2016, 2020, and 2024, Donald Trump received the highest percentages of the vote ever cast for a presidential candidate in this county. He held Democratic candidates Hillary Clinton, Joe Biden, and Kamala Harris to 10%, 11%, and 10% of the vote, respectively.

Voter Registration and Party Enrollment of Grant County
Party	Total	Percentage
Democratic	663	9.00%
Republican	5,086	69.05%
Independents, unaffiliated, and other	1,617	21.95%
Total	7,366	100.00%

United States presidential election results for Grant County, West Virginia
Year	Republican		Democratic		Third party(ies)	
Year	No.	%	No.	%	No.	%
1868	383	95.27%	19	4.73%	0	0.00%
1872	443	71.80%	174	28.20%	0	0.00%
1876	606	65.73%	316	34.27%	0	0.00%
1880	611	65.63%	320	34.37%	0	0.00%
1884	826	70.84%	340	29.16%	0	0.00%
1888	1,027	72.53%	378	26.69%	11	0.78%
1892	1,155	73.75%	400	25.54%	11	0.70%
1896	1,306	77.32%	372	22.02%	11	0.65%
1900	1,355	78.32%	367	21.21%	8	0.46%
1904	1,298	79.53%	312	19.12%	22	1.35%
1908	1,305	78.14%	336	20.12%	29	1.74%
1912	349	20.02%	356	20.42%	1,038	59.55%
1916	1,438	78.41%	391	21.32%	5	0.27%
1920	2,417	82.15%	492	16.72%	33	1.12%
1924	2,344	75.49%	658	21.19%	103	3.32%
1928	2,648	82.83%	542	16.95%	7	0.22%
1932	2,477	72.15%	920	26.80%	36	1.05%
1936	2,923	74.51%	995	25.36%	5	0.13%
1940	3,195	78.85%	857	21.15%	0	0.00%
1944	2,996	84.02%	570	15.98%	0	0.00%
1948	2,816	80.83%	664	19.06%	4	0.11%
1952	3,282	82.96%	674	17.04%	0	0.00%
1956	3,408	84.31%	634	15.69%	0	0.00%
1960	3,333	78.59%	908	21.41%	0	0.00%
1964	2,464	62.25%	1,494	37.75%	0	0.00%
1968	2,936	73.81%	786	19.76%	256	6.44%
1972	3,556	85.28%	614	14.72%	0	0.00%
1976	2,976	69.23%	1,323	30.77%	0	0.00%
1980	3,452	75.19%	1,041	22.67%	98	2.13%
1984	3,715	81.58%	828	18.18%	11	0.24%
1988	3,215	77.85%	893	21.62%	22	0.53%
1992	2,762	64.26%	1,011	23.52%	525	12.21%
1996	2,599	60.48%	1,206	28.07%	492	11.45%
2000	3,571	78.76%	891	19.65%	72	1.59%
2004	4,063	80.50%	963	19.08%	21	0.42%
2008	3,166	75.06%	997	23.64%	55	1.30%
2012	3,783	82.45%	718	15.65%	87	1.90%
2016	4,346	87.53%	512	10.31%	107	2.16%
2020	4,871	88.40%	607	11.02%	32	0.58%
2024	4,949	88.88%	552	9.91%	67	1.20%

=== State politics ===
At the state level, Grant County voted for popular Democratic governor Joe Manchin over his GOP opponent Russ Weeks by over 20 points in 2008.

Grant County is represented in one Senate district with two Senators in the West Virginia Senate. Senate members Senate members Jay Taylor (R) and Randy Smith (R) both serve in West Virginia's 14th Senate district. The county is represented in the West Virginia House of Delegates by one Delegate. The Delegate for Grant County is John Paul Hott (R) for district 85.

=== County government ===
Grant County's government consists the County Administrator and the County Commission. The County Administrator is the county executive that handles all administrative duties for and reports to the County Commission. The position of the Grant County Administrator is currently held by Michelle Sites.

The Grant County Commission consists of three members. The current members of the County Commission are Kevin P. Hagerty, Scotty Miley and Tyson Riggleman.

== See also ==
- Grant County Schools
- National Register of Historic Places listings in Grant County, West Virginia
