= Valley, West Virginia =

- Unincorporated community
- Location within Romney, West Virginia Location within Eastern Panhandle of West Virginia Location within West Virginia Location within the United States
- Coordinates: 39°20′54.67″N 78°45′36.81″W
- Country: United States
- State: West Virginia
- County: Hampshire
- Time zone: UTC-5 (Eastern (EST))
  - Summer (DST): UTC-4 (EDT)
- GNIS feature ID: 2747081

Valley was a populated place and post office on the South Branch line of the Baltimore and Ohio Railroad in the U.S. state of West Virginia. It was centered near the intersection of West Sioux Lane and Depot Valley Road, now located within the present-day corporate boundaries of Romney. Valley developed in 1884 following the completion of the South Branch line when the rail line's original southern terminus and corresponding Romney Depot were built there. The United States Post Office Department established a post office at Valley on May 19, 1928, remaining in operation until its disestablishment on June 15, 1937. Following the closure of Valley's post office, its mail was routed through the post office in Romney.

== History ==
The land upon which Valley later developed was originally part of the Northern Neck Proprietary, a land grant that the exiled Charles II awarded to seven of his supporters in 1649 during the English Interregnum. Following the Restoration in 1660, Charles II finally ascended to the English throne. Charles II renewed the Northern Neck Proprietary grant in 1662, revised it in 1669, and again renewed the original grant favoring original grantee Thomas Colepeper, 2nd Baron Colepeper and Henry Bennet, 1st Earl of Arlington in 1672. In 1681, Bennet sold his share to Lord Colepeper, and Lord Colepeper received a new charter for the entire land grant from James II in 1688.

Following the deaths of Lord Colepeper, his wife Margaret, and his daughter Katherine, the Northern Neck Proprietary passed to Katherine's son Thomas Fairfax, 6th Lord Fairfax of Cameron in 1719. Lord Fairfax selected a portion of the proprietary for his manor. This tract, known as the South Branch Survey of the Northern Neck Proprietary, extended from the north end of the Trough to the junction of the North and South Branches of the Potomac River. In 1748, Fairfax commissioned James Genn to survey the South Branch Potomac River lowlands for sale and lease, with lots ranging in size from 300 to 400 acres (120 to 160 ha). Valley was located within the northern section of Lot Number 17 of the South Branch Survey, which Lord Fairfax granted to Samuel Earle in 1749. Earle was a gentleman from Frederick County, Virginia.

By 1778, Isaac Parsons (1752–96) was in ownership of Lot Number 17. The parcel was later resurveyed for David Hunter by surveyor John Mitchel on April 17, 1788. Lot Number 17 was bound to the west by the Yellow Banks and the South Branch Potomac River below, to the north by Lot Number 20, and to the south by Lot Number 16. Most of the western area of the present-day corporate boundaries of Romney were located within Lot Number 17. Lot Number 17's eastern boundary stretched between the present-day Savilla-Vale and Wirgman Hill neighborhoods of Romney. The location of Valley was not included in surveyor John Mitchel's plan for Romney dated June 30, 1790, and the forested lands of Depot Valley remained undeveloped into the 19th century.

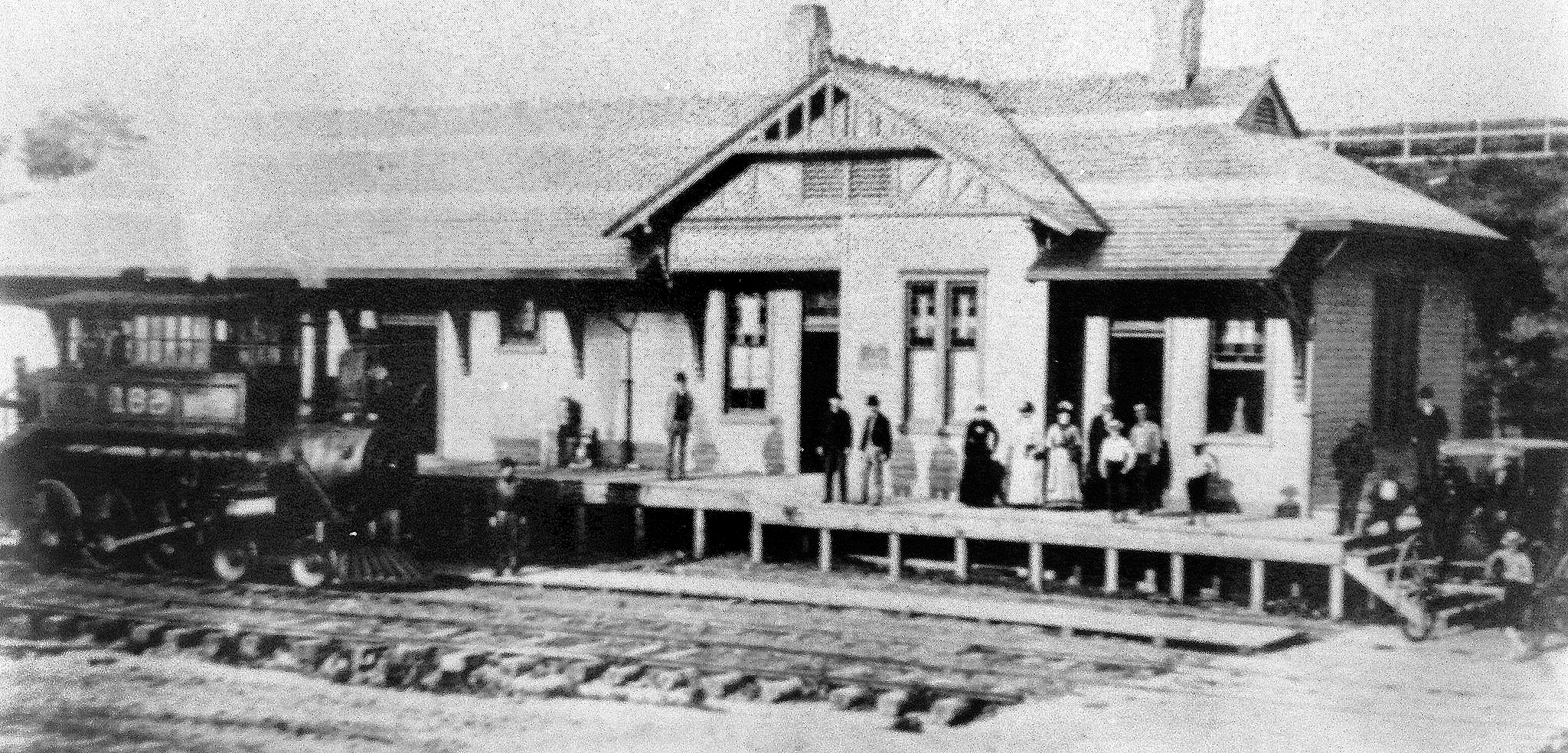
Romney Depot, photographed in 1886.

In 1883 the Baltimore and Ohio Railroad agreed to complete the South Branch Railway Company's planned rail line between Green Spring on the Baltimore and Ohio Railroad's main line and Romney. Construction of the rail line began immediately. Completed in 1884, it spanned a length of 16.29 miles (26.22 km). The original southern terminus of the Baltimore and Ohio Railroad's South Branch line and the Romney Depot were built at the southern end of Depot Valley, around which Valley developed. The South Branch line formally opened for traffic on September 1, 1884. It was at this time that Depot Valley received its name from the Romney Depot. The Baltimore and Ohio Railroad continued to operate the South Branch line and later acquired the property outright by deed on November 20, 1912.

The arrival of the Baltimore and Ohio Railroad and Romney Depot to Depot Valley brought residential development on the hilltops to the west and east of Valley. On September 27, 1911, George Edward Harmison (1863–1916) conducted a public auction of Valley View farm's fields atop Yellow Banks overlooking the South Branch Potomac River. The land was located atop the hill to the west of Valley. Harmison subdivided the fields into lots, and the planned development was known as the Valley View Addition to Romney. Harmison sold 21 of the land lots at the auction, and several lots were sold privately. A free lot was given to J. H. Newhouse, and Harmison set aside two lots on a bluff for the site of a future hospital, which he planned to deed to any entity willing to build one.

As Romney Depot's passenger and freight services expanded and a populated place continued to develop around the depot, the need for a post office began to grow. On February 6, 1928, a "location form" was submitted to the United States Post Office Department suggesting that the Valley post office be located at Romney Depot in Depot Valley. The form noted the post office at Valley would be located a mere 1.75 miles (2.82 km) northeast of the Vanderlip post office along the South Branch line. The United States Post Office Department established the post office at Valley on May 19, 1928. The post office at Valley was disestablished on June 15, 1937, and its mail was afterward routed to the post office at Romney.

External image
- "Hampshire County, W. Va. - North Section" from New Descriptive Atlas of West Virginia (1933) by John R. Ice.

Valley was included in a transportation map of Hampshire County compiled by John R. Ice in his New Descriptive Atlas of West Virginia published by Clarksburg Publishing Company in 1933.

Beginning with the arrival of the Baltimore and Ohio Railroad's South Branch line to Romney in the 1880s, a passenger train conducted three trips daily (morning, noon, and evening) from the Romney Depot at Valley to Green Spring on the Baltimore and Ohio Railroad's main line. During the 1930s, passenger ridership on the South Branch line began to decline, and passenger service was finally discontinued shortly thereafter. A special passenger train carried students of the West Virginia Schools for the Deaf and Blind, arriving at Romney Depot in Valley in the fall, and departing in the spring to take the students home. The last special train to transport the students of the West Virginia Schools for the Deaf and Blind departed Romney Depot in the spring of 1941. Freight operations from Romney Depot later ceased, and the station was closed and demolished soon after.

In 1972, the Baltimore and Ohio Railroad was merged into the Chessie System, which planned to close and abandon the South Branch line. The Romney spur through Depot Valley remained in service and was illustrated by the United States Geological Survey on its 1973 Romney Quadrangle topographic map. On October 11, 1978, the Chessie System transferred ownership of the South Branch line to the South Branch Valley Railroad, which in turn was owned and operated by the West Virginia State Rail Authority. During this transition, the Romney spur of the South Branch Valley Railroad was abandoned, after which all rail and commercial activity at Valley ceased.

== Geography ==
Valley was located in Depot Valley approximately 0.5 miles (0.80 km) northwest of downtown Romney. Depot Valley stretches 0.5 miles (0.80 km) north from West Sioux Lane to Valley View farm, through which a small unnamed tributary stream of Big Run flows, paralleling Depot Valley Road and the former Romney spur of the South Branch rail line for the entirety of its course through the valley. Valley was connected to Romney to the southeast via West Sioux Lane. As of 2014, the former location of Valley and the surrounding Depot Valley are covered by secondary forest. The residential areas on the hill to the west and on Depot Hill to the east remain.

== Bibliography ==
- Brannon, Selden W., ed. (1976). Historic Hampshire: A Symposium of Hampshire County and Its People, Past and Present. Parsons, West Virginia: McClain Printing Company. ISBN 978-0-87012-236-1. OCLC 3121468. Archived from the original on October 28, 2013.
- Coleman, Roy V. (1951). Liberty and Property. New York City: Scribner. OCLC 1020487 – via Internet Archive.
- Federal Writers' Project (1937). Historic Romney 1762–1937. Romney, West Virginia: Federal Writers' Project, The Town Council of Romney, West Virginia. OCLC 2006735. Archived from the original on January 1, 2014.
- Ice, John R. (1933). New Descriptive Atlas of West Virginia: Contains a Separate Map of the State and Each of the Fifty-five Counties. Clarksburg, West Virginia: Clarksburg Publishing Company. OCLC 78952942. Archived from the original on December 25, 2016.
- McMaster, Len (2010). Hampshire County West Virginia Post Offices, Part 2 (PDF). LaPosta: A Journal of American Postal History. Archived (PDF) from the original on October 5, 2015.
- Munske, Roberta R.; Kerns, Wilmer L., eds. (2004). Hampshire County, West Virginia, 1754–2004. Romney, West Virginia: The Hampshire County 250th Anniversary Committee. ISBN 978-0-9715738-2-6. OCLC 55983178.
- Rice, Otis K. (2015). The Allegheny Frontier: West Virginia Beginnings, 1730–1830. Lexington, Kentucky: University Press of Kentucky. ISBN 978-0-8131-6438-0. OCLC 900345296. Archived from the original on May 27, 2016 – via Google Books.
- Rose, Cornelia Bruère (1976). Arlington County, Virginia: A History. Arlington County, Virginia: Arlington Historical Society. OCLC 2401541. Archived from the original on April 2, 2016 – via Google Books.
- William and Mary Quarterly (April 1898). "The Northern Neck of Virginia". William and Mary Quarterly. 6 (4). Williamsburg, Virginia: College of William & Mary: 222–6. doi:10.2307/1915885. ISSN 0043-5597. JSTOR 1915885. OCLC 1607858.
