= Millen, West Virginia =

- Unincorporated community
- Location within West Virginia Location within the United States
- Coordinates: 39°31′6″N 78°37′48″W
- Country: United States
- State: West Virginia
- County: Hampshire
- Time zone: UTC-5 (Eastern (EST))
  - Summer (DST): UTC-4 (EDT)
- GNIS feature ID: 1543356

Millen is an unincorporated community in Hampshire County, West Virginia, United States between Donaldson and Green Spring on Green Spring Road (West Virginia Secondary Route 1) and the South Branch Valley Railroad. Millen is nestled in Green Spring Valley along Green Spring Run between Green Spring Ridge (881 feet) and Valley Mountain (1,437 feet).

== Church ==
- Forest Glen United Methodist Church, Green Spring Road (CR 1)
