= Trout Run (Cacapon River tributary) =

River in West Virginia, United States

Coordinates: 39°04′36″N 78°35′51″W

Trout Run is an 18.5-mile-long (29.8 km) tributary of the Cacapon River, belonging to the Potomac River and Chesapeake Bay watersheds. The stream is located in Hardy County in West Virginia's Eastern Panhandle. Trout Run rises between Devils Hole Mountain and Great North Mountain near the Virginia state line in the George Washington National Forest. The stream empties into the Cacapon River at Wardensville.

== Tributaries ==
Tributary streams are listed in order from south (source) to north (mouth).

- Deep Gutter Run
- Halfmoon Run
- Thorny Bottom Run

== List of communities along Trout Run ==
- Rockland
- Perry
- Wardensville

== See also ==
- List of West Virginia rivers
