= Green Spring Run =

Tributary stream of the North Branch Potomac River in West Virginia

Green Spring Run Greenspring Creek Greenspring Run
- Location of mouth of Green Spring Run Green Spring Run (West Virginia) Green Spring Run (the United States)

Location
- Country: United States
- State: West Virginia
- County: Hampshire
- Magisterial District: Springfield

Physical characteristics
- Source: Greenwood Hollow, northwest of Springfield, West Virginia
  - location: Hampshire County, West Virginia
  - coordinates: 39°28′46.33″N 78°42′47.06″W
  - elevation: 1,084 ft (330 m)
- Mouth: North Branch Potomac River
  - location: near Green Spring, West Virginia
  - coordinates: 39°31′58.33″N 78°36′19.05″W
  - elevation: 531 ft (162 m)
- Length: 8.9 m (29 ft)

Basin features
- Progression: North Branch Potomac River → Potomac River → Chesapeake Bay
- River system: Potomac River

Green Spring Run is an 8.9-mile-long (14.3 km) tributary stream of the North Branch Potomac River in Hampshire County in the U.S. state of West Virginia. Green Spring Run rises in Greenwood Hollow north of Springfield and meanders northeast through Green Spring Valley. The South Branch Valley Railroad and Green Spring Road (West Virginia Secondary Route 1) run parallel to the stream. It runs through the community of Green Spring, from which the stream takes its name. From Green Spring, Green Spring Run flows east where it reaches its confluence with the North Branch Potomac shortly before the North Branch joins with the South Branch Potomac River to form the Potomac River.

According to the Geographic Names Information System, Green Spring Run has also been known as Greenspring Creek.

== See also ==
- List of rivers of West Virginia
