= Potomac Eagle Scenic Railroad =

Railroad in West Virginia, United States

Coordinates: 39°21′40.9″N 78°45′06.0″W

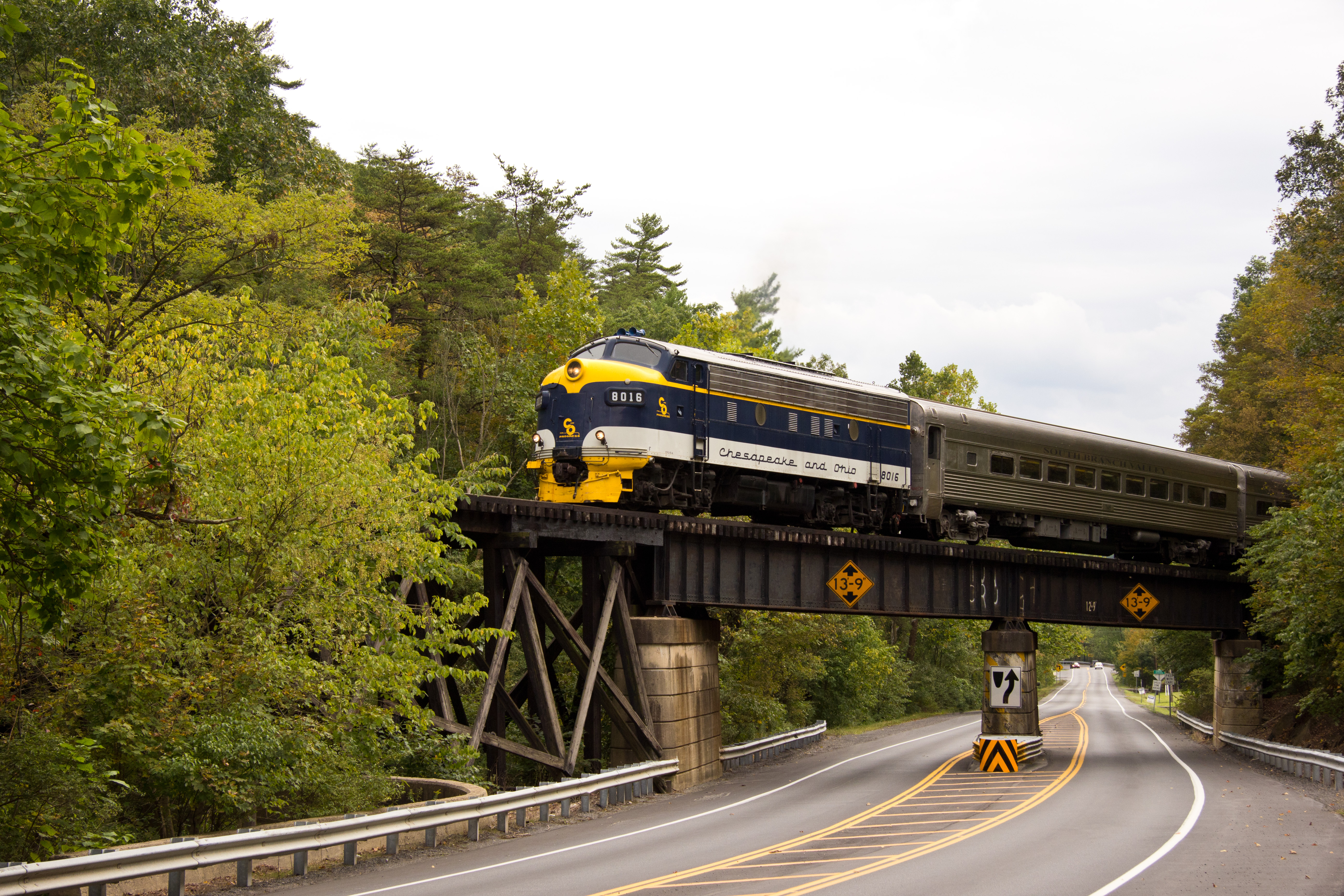
- An EMD F3 leads an excursion over Route 28 north of Springfield, West Virginia.

The Potomac Eagle Scenic Railroad (reporting mark PESX) is a heritage railroad based in Romney, West Virginia.

The railroad operates excursion trains over a former Baltimore and Ohio Railroad line that runs between Green Spring and Petersburg. The West Virginia State Rail Authority (SRA) owns the line and freight service is provided by the South Branch Valley Railroad.

The Potomac Eagle Scenic Railroad's excursion trains run from Romney to Moorefield with occasional longer trips to Petersburg. All excursions use diesel locomotives.

A highlight of the trip is passage along the South Branch Potomac River through "The Trough", an area noted for bald eagle sightings.

== History ==
The Potomac Eagle Scenic runs on the track of the South Branch Valley Railroad, which was established by the state of West Virginia in 1978 to operate a line abandoned by the B&O. Freight service on this line operates on weekdays and occasionally on weekends, so the line is free for excursions on most weekends.

In 1989 efforts began to attract an excursion operator, and service began in 1991.

== Equipment ==
=== Current Engines ===
The Potomac Eagle Scenic operates a mixture of cars behind four early model diesels:

- F7A #722 (ex-Bessemer and Lake Erie), recently repainted into a B&O livery similar to 6604.
- FP9A #1755 (ex-Algoma Central).
- GP9 #6604* (ex-B&O), one of the distinctive "torpedo boat" units built for passenger service and restored to its original livery
- GP9 #6240* (ex C&O) in Chessie System livery
- GP9/GP9U #8250 (ex Canadian Pacific)

* owned by South Branch Valley Railroad

=== Former Engines ===
- F3A/F3AU #8016/#116 (ex Clinchfield Railroad), ex-CSX #116, sold to the C&O Historical Society and restored as Chesapeake and Ohio #8016 in the C&O passenger paint scheme; is now restored to its original identity, Clinchfield #800.
- FPA4 #6793 (ex Canadian National Railway), was painted in Potomac Eagle Livery, sold to the Grand Canyon Railway where it was painted into the Grand Canyon passenger Livery and still works today.
- FP7A #118 (ex Clinchfield), ex-CSX #118, sold in the early 2000s to the Durbin and Greenbrier Valley Railroad, renumbered to 67 and painted in a Western Maryland Scheme.

== See also ==
- List of heritage railroads in the United States
- Places on the South Branch Valley Railroad
