= Wickham, West Virginia (disambiguation) =

Wickham is the name of several communities in the U.S. state of West Virginia.

- Wickham, Hampshire County, West Virginia
- Wickham, Raleigh County, West Virginia
