= Bass, West Virginia =

Unincorporated community in West Virginia, United States

- Unincorporated community
- Location within West Virginia Location within the United States
- Coordinates: 38°56′54″N 79°0′8″W
- Country: United States
- State: West Virginia
- County: Hardy
- Time zone: UTC-5 (Eastern (EST))
  - Summer (DST): UTC-4 (EDT)
- GNIS feature ID: 1553810

Bass is an unincorporated community on the South Fork South Branch Potomac River in Hardy County, West Virginia, United States. Bass lies along County Highway 7.

Bass was so named, by Glaspy V. Wolfe, Postmaster, on account of there being bass fish in the nearby creek.

== Adam Wolfe, Sr ==
During the great conflict from 1861 to 1865, most of the people of the South Branch Valley (later Hardy County) supported the Confederacy.

However, sentiments of western Virginia were predominately for the North, as were sentiments of the Wolfe (Wolf/ Woolf) family as they struggled to support the government and their country.

The Home Guard of the North worked to prevent enlistment with the South, to provider safety for soldiers of the South who chose the North, to prevent confiscation of properties by the South, and to provide protection.

By the mid-1700s the Wolfe family had settled on what has come to be known as Wolfe Mountain in the South Fork area of the county.

Adam Sr. ("Paddy") and Sophia Wolfe raised their sons, Adam Jr., James, Benjamin, Jacob, George, and daughters, Susan (Roby) and Sarah (Ruddle) in their two-story log cabin. The house had a tunnel constructed to open into a gulley in the not too distant woods. The hidden tunnel was well used during the conflict, as local Confederate soldiers sought refuge, and as the Home Guard sought to protect southern soldiers who sided with the North.

"Paddy," a blacksmith and farmer, was well known for his home-brewed moonshine. With the use of a hot iron, a hammer and chisel, the center of a white oak log was hewn out to form a "yag," used for storing and transporting the brew. A slice of the log was shaped for a close fitting lid.

Son, Adam Jr. b. 1819 d. 1893 and grandson George b. 1841 joined with other local men to form a Home Guard Company commanded by Captain Sampson Snyder. In 1866, Adam Jr., corresponded with a law firm in Washington, DC to recover funds for his services "as a scout, as a spy, and a guard" and for losses the family suffered during the Civil War.

Adam Wolfe Jr., and his first wife Rebecca See were the parents of four sons, John, George, Jacob, Anderson, and one daughter, Martha. Adam and his son John ("Mink") became well known blacksmiths admired for their unusual cow/ sheep bells constructed with welded seams. The rounded-corner bells were welded by placing pellets of brass in clay and putting this in the seams. As the bells were heated, the brass melted to seal the seam. The clay was removed leaving a smooth finished product. Bells were inscribed with the initial of the maker.

John Harmonious Wolfe b. 1849 d. 1926 and Katie Ann Sherman (Catharine Ann Shireman) b. 1862 d. 1955 were married in 1879. They raised 14 children: Martha Delaware, Glaspy Valentine, Pleas Harmon, Lemual Price, Roxanna Eunice, Amby Kenneth, Blossie Chloe, Wilbur Vance, Ramon Orville, Courtney Dewey, Loring Dacy, Ira Roosevelt, Hazel Leota, and Melvin Paige. They also reared a niece, Blanch, whose mother died when she was six weeks old.

The family is known for its longevity in family reunions with the first held on September 14, 1919, and the 70th held on September 3, 1989. ~ by Elizabeth Wolfe Whitener

== Glaspy Wolfe ==
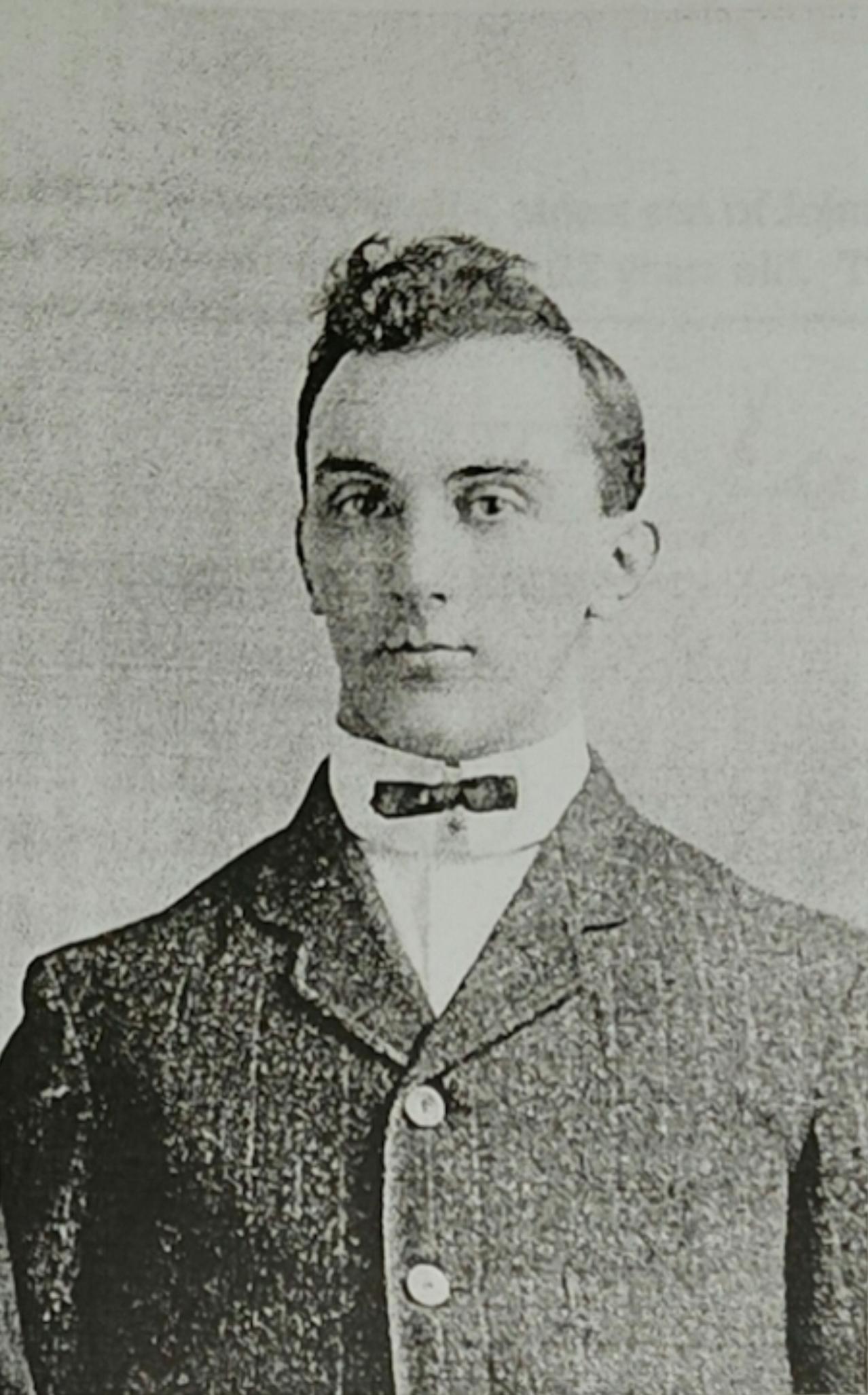
A portrait of Glaspy Valentine Wolfe in his youth, founder and local Postmaster of Bass, West Virginia.

This is another story about Wolfe Mountain located about a mile off the South Fork road near what would later be Bass, West Virginia.

Glaspy Valentine Wolfe was the second of fourteen children born to John Harman Wolfe and Katie Ann Sherman Wolfe. He was born on Wolfe Mountain on January 25, 1882.

He attended grade school at the See School on South Fork.

After finishing school, Glaspy, several brothers and a cousin went to Cumberland, Maryland to find employment. They went to work for the B&O Railroad Company. Glaspy, as a brakeman on the line between Cumberland, MD and Pittsburgh, PA.

It was on one of these runs that he was called by the blast of the whistle to come from the caboose to the engine at the front of the train, to take water at the water tower. When he finished and was making his way back over the cars to the caboose, he slipped on the ice and snow, and fell down between the engine and the first car. The complete train passed over him, mangling both legs.

Glaspy was transported on the train to McKeesport Station where they were met by an ambulance. He was taken to McKeesport hospital. There they had to finish amputating his legs.

After a long recuperating period he was fitted with artificial legs.

He later attended Catherman's Business School. At this time he was approximately 21 years old.

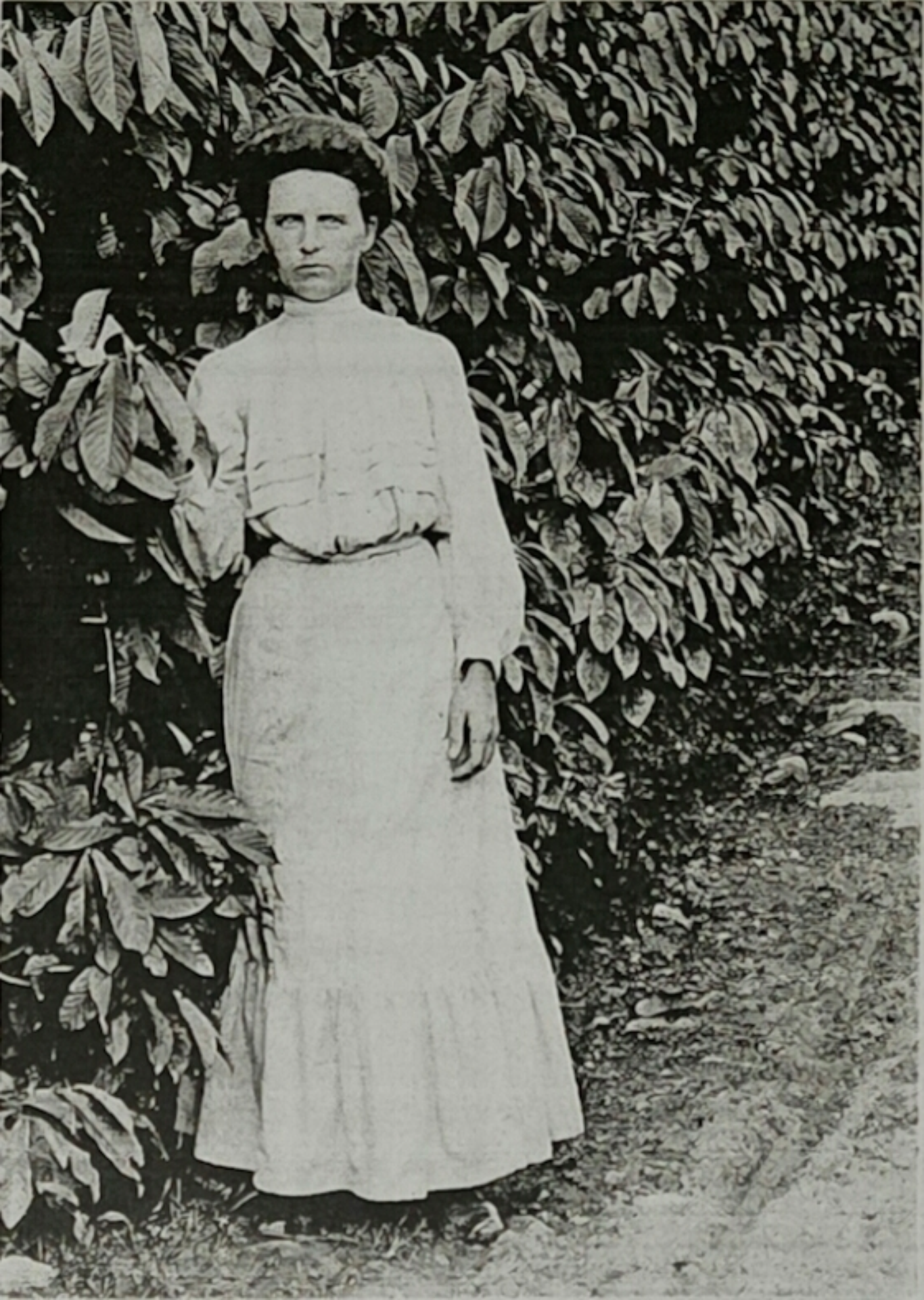
A portrait of Josephine Irene Southerly Wolfe in her youth, wife of Bass, West Virginia Postmaster Glaspy V. Wolfe.

Glaspy then returned to South Fork where he purchased a plot of ground from George Paskel located at the foot of Wolfe Mountain. He built a small house and country store. This later became the Bass Post Office which he named after the fish in the river.

August 19, 1909 he married Josephine Southerly, daughter of Abraham and Rose Ann Southerly. To this union were born eight children: Curtis, Eugene, Omer, Hester, Warren, Carl, Earl, and Ralph.

Glaspy continued with the store and post office and a little farming until the family was grown.

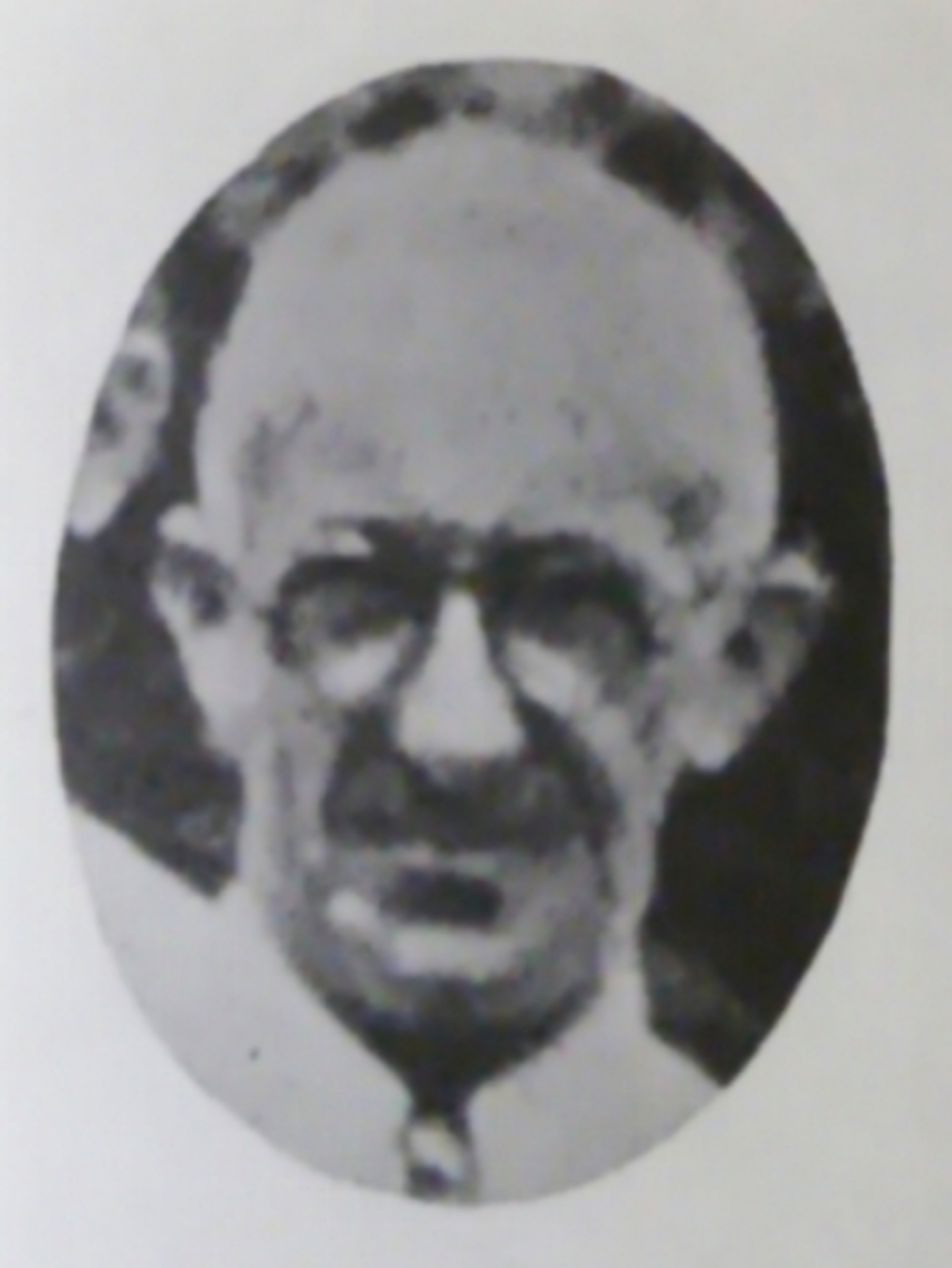
Glaspy Valentine Wolfe in his later years.

He then bought The Valley News Agency which he operated until his death on October 4, 1944.

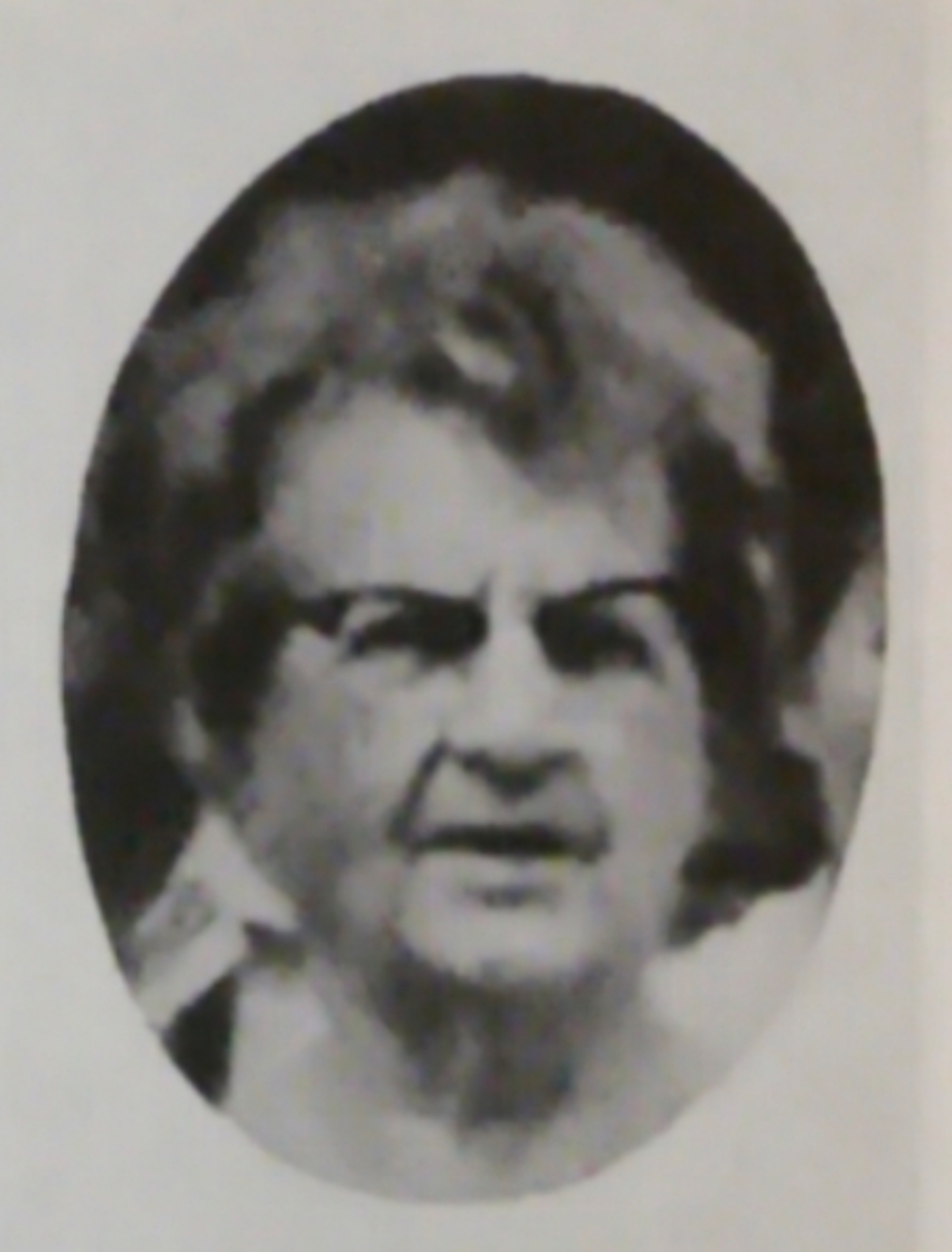
Josephine Irene Southerly Wolfe in her later years.

Josephine, with only a few months schooling, operated it until she retired at the age of 75 years. She died April 17, 1985.

Glaspy and Josephine are both buried in Olivet Cemetery at Moorefield, WV. ~ by Hester Wolfe Newhouse

== The West Virginia Hills ==
Since the first Wolfe Family Reunion held in 1919, "The West Virginia Hills" by Ellen Amanda King has been part of the family tradition.

Oh, the West Virginia hills!

How majestic and how grand,

With their summits bathed in glory,

Like our Prince Immanuel's Land!

Is it any wonder then,

That my heart with rapture thrills

As I stand once more with loved ones

On those West Virginia hills?

Chorus

Oh, the hills, beautiful hills,

How I love those West Virginia hills!

If o'er sea o'er land I roam,

Still I'll think of happy home,

And my friends among the West Virginia hills!

Oh, the hills, beautiful hills,

How I love those West Virginia hills!
