= Fort Run, West Virginia =

Unincorporated community in West Virginia, United States

- Unincorporated community
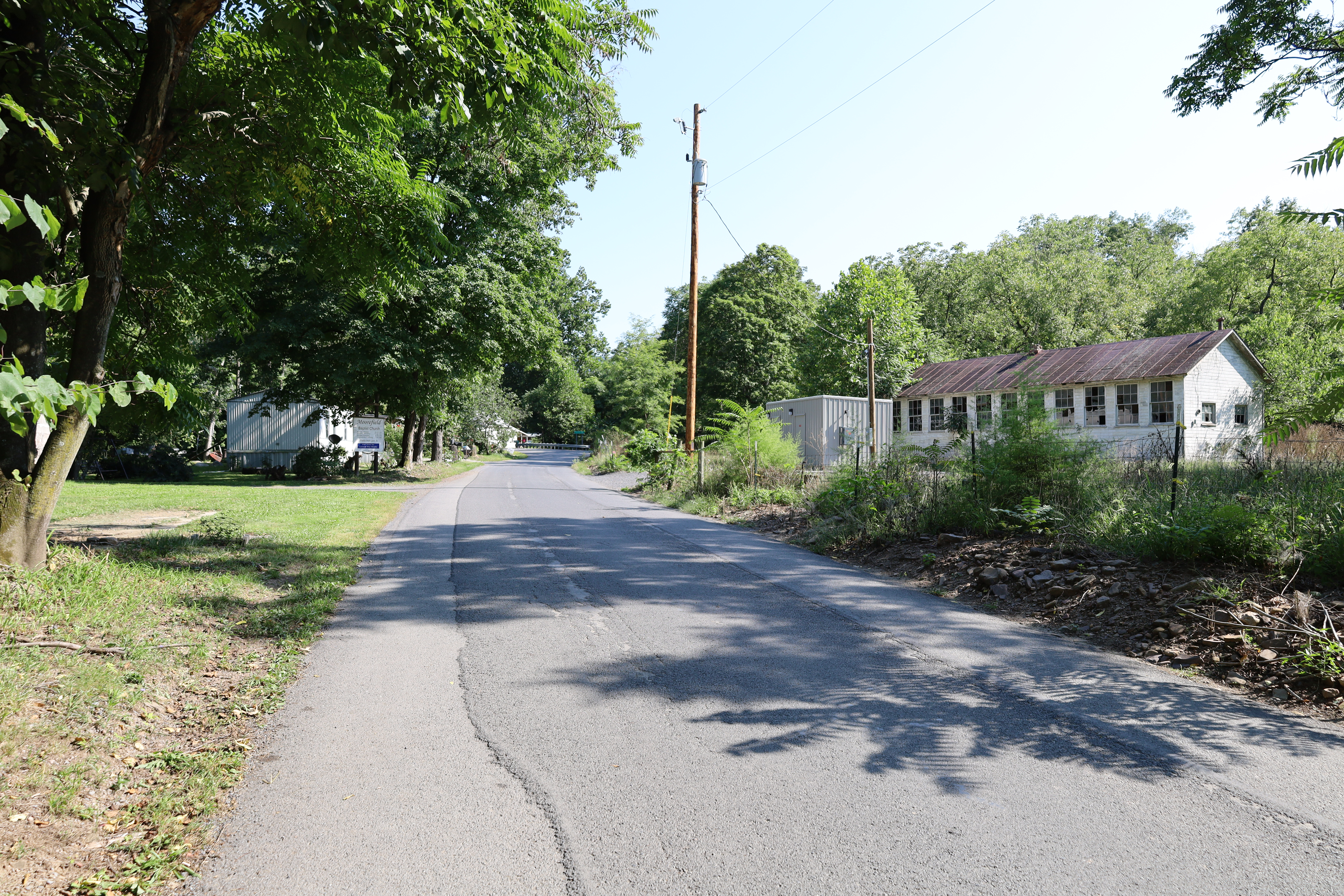

- Location within West Virginia Location within the United States
- Coordinates: 39°4′0″N 78°55′21″W
- Country: United States
- State: West Virginia
- County: Hardy
- Elevation: 978 ft (298 m)
- Time zone: UTC-5 (Eastern (EST))
  - Summer (DST): UTC-4 (EDT)
- GNIS feature ID: 1554497

Fort Run is an unincorporated community in Hardy County, West Virginia, United States. It takes its name from the adjacent stream and lies off U.S. Route 48 to the east of Moorefield.
