= Needmore, West Virginia =

- Unincorporated community
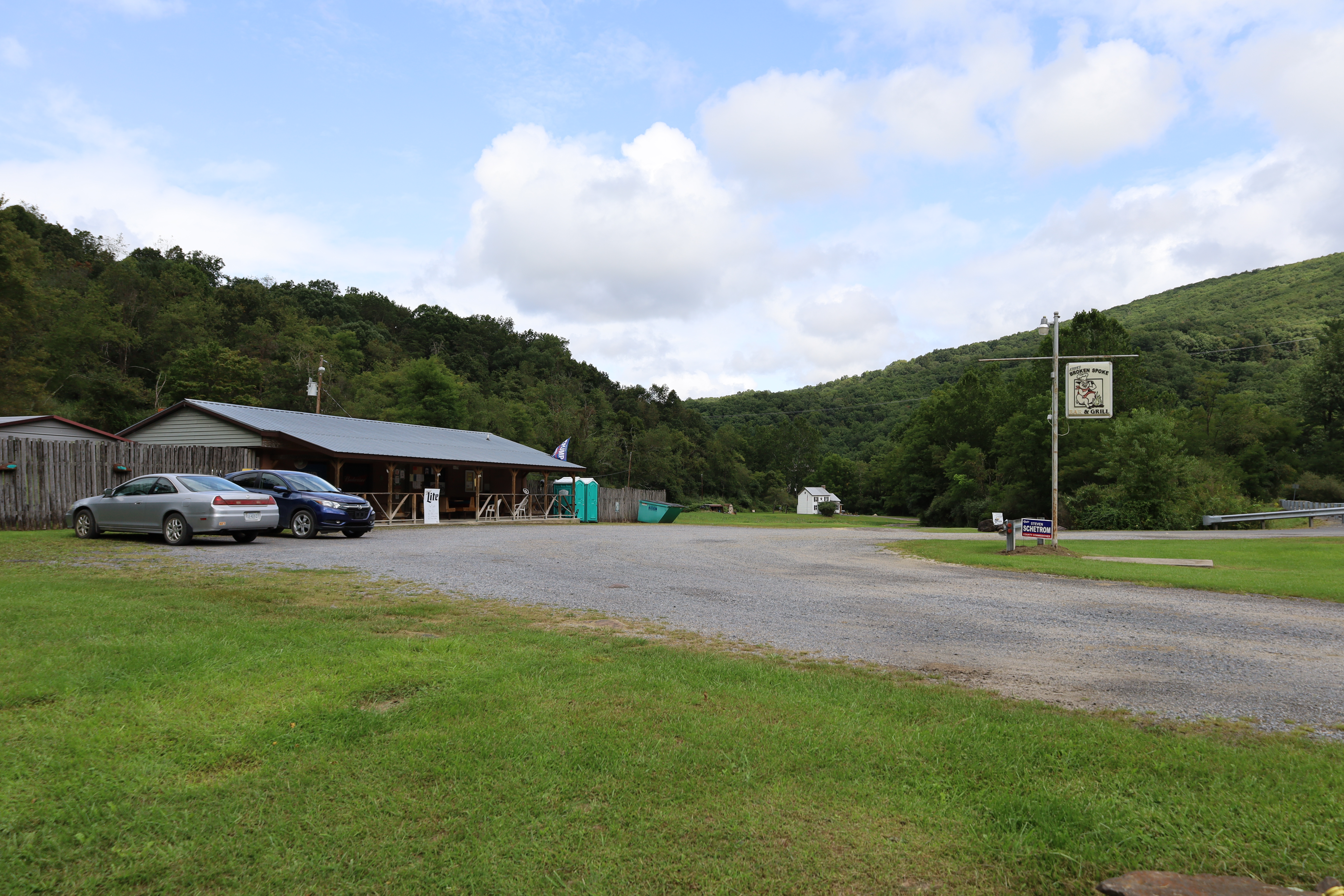

- Location within West Virginia Location within the United States
- Coordinates: 39°3′2″N 78°47′12″W
- Country: United States
- State: West Virginia
- County: Hardy
- Time zone: UTC-5 (Eastern (EST))
  - Summer (DST): UTC-4 (EDT)
- GNIS feature ID: 1555194

Needmore is an unincorporated community in Hardy County, West Virginia, United States. Needmore lies along West Virginia Route 55 to the west of Baker.

The community most likely received its name because it needed more of everything.
