= South Branch Wildlife Management Area =

State Wildlife Management Area in Hampshire and Hardy counties, West Virginia

- IUCN category V (protected landscape/seascape)
- Location within West Virginia
- Location: West Virginia, United States
- Coordinates: 39°08′48″N 78°54′54″W
- Area: 1,092 acres (4.42 km^{2})
- Elevation: 915 ft (279 m)
- Website: WVDNR District 2 Wildlife Management Areas

The South Branch Wildlife Management Area is 1,092 acres (4.42 km^{2}) of mixed oak-hickory woodlands and pastures in Hampshire and Hardy Counties, West Virginia, USA. The South Branch WMA consists of four separate tracts (McNeill, Bridge, Trough Club, and Sector) along the South Branch Potomac River around and south of the river gorge known as The Trough. It is known throughout the region for its dove, squirrel, deer, and wild turkey hunting. The WMA is owned by the West Virginia Division of Natural Resources.

== Invasive species ==
The air-breathing northern snakehead (Channa argus), a species of fish native to East Asia, has recently been reported in the lower Potomac River. Although no snakeheads have been detected in West Virginia, this invasive species from northern China had been declared a threat to the state's aquatic ecosystem. Federal law prohibits transport of snakeheads across state lines. Anyone who catches this fish when visiting the South Branch WMA should carefully note the catch location, kill the fish by cutting or bleeding, and contact a WVDNR district biologist. The snakehead should not be released back into the Potomac River or any tributary.

== See also ==
- Animal conservation
- Fishing
- Hunting
- List of West Virginia wildlife management areas
