= Bean Settlement, West Virginia =

Unincorporated community in West Virginia, United States

Bean Settlement
- Unincorporated community
- Location within the state of West Virginia Bean Settlement (the United States)
- Coordinates: 39°6′54″N 78°49′33″W
- Country: United States
- State: West Virginia
- County: Hardy
- Elevation: 2,096 ft (639 m)
- Time zone: UTC-5 (Eastern (EST))
  - Summer (DST): UTC-4 (EDT)
- GNIS feature ID: 1553816

Bean Settlement is an unincorporated community in Hardy County, West Virginia, United States. According to the Geographic Names Information System, the Bean Settlement community has also been known as Asbury, Asbury Church, Bean's, and Fabius.

== Historic sites ==
- Asbury Church
