= Basore, West Virginia =

Unincorporated community in West Virginia, United States

- Unincorporated community
- Location within West Virginia Location within the United States
- Coordinates: 38°51′49″N 78°49′49″W
- Country: United States
- State: West Virginia
- County: Hardy
- Time zone: UTC-5 (Eastern (EST))
  - Summer (DST): UTC-4 (EDT)
- GNIS feature ID: 1553809

Basore is an unincorporated community on Upper Cove Run in Hardy County, West Virginia, United States. Basore lies to the east of Mathias at the eastern approach of a gap in Cove Mountain.

== Historic sites ==
- Basore Schoolhouse
