= Walnut Bottom, West Virginia =

- Unincorporated community
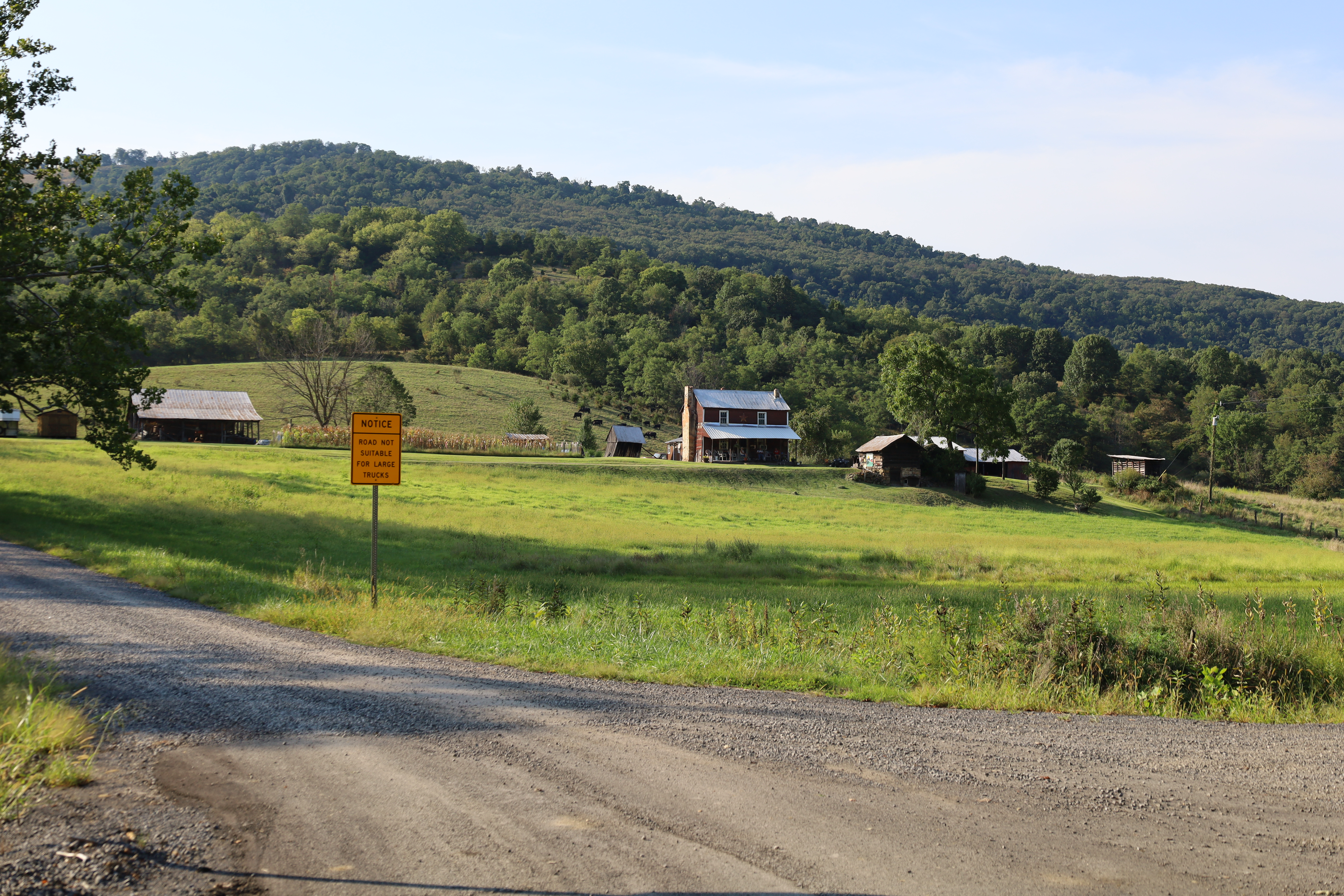

- Location within West Virginia Location within the United States
- Coordinates: 39°6′21″N 79°0′58″W
- Country: United States
- State: West Virginia
- County: Hardy
- Time zone: UTC-5 (Eastern (EST))
  - Summer (DST): UTC-4 (EDT)
- GNIS feature ID: 1555911

Walnut Bottom is an unincorporated community in Hardy County, West Virginia, United States.
