= Rockland, Hardy County, West Virginia =

- Unincorporated community
- Location within West Virginia Location within the United States
- Coordinates: 38°56′39″N 78°41′33″W
- Country: United States
- State: West Virginia
- County: Hardy
- Time zone: UTC-5 (Eastern (EST))
  - Summer (DST): UTC-4 (EDT)
- GNIS feature ID: 1552707

Rockland is an unincorporated community in Hardy County, West Virginia, United States. Originally, the community was known as Rockland Mills. Rockland is located within Trout Run Valley in the George Washington National Forest.
