= Baughman Settlement, West Virginia =

Unincorporated community in West Virginia, United States

Baughman Settlement
- Unincorporated community
- Location within the state of West Virginia Baughman Settlement (the United States)
- Coordinates: 39°0′41″N 78°44′19″W
- Country: United States
- State: West Virginia
- County: Hardy
- Elevation: 1,742 ft (531 m)
- Time zone: UTC-5 (Eastern (EST))
  - Summer (DST): UTC-4 (EDT)
- GNIS feature ID: 1553811

Baughman Settlement is an unincorporated community in eastern Hardy County, West Virginia, United States. It lies on the western flank of Breakneck Ridge in close vicinity to the Lost River.

== Mount Moriah Lutheran Church ==
At the center of the community stands Mount Moriah Lutheran Church, constructed around the year 1907. The earliest recorded Lutheran activity in Baughman Settlement dates from 1833 when the Cedar Hill Lutheran Church was organized. In its earliest years, the church was served by local ministers as part of a circuit, including the Rev. Peter Miller of the Capon North River Parish, who served the church during the Civil War. In 1907, dedication services were held for the present church, which by that time had been renamed Mount Moriah. It is believed that the earlier church stood adjacent to the present structure. Lutheran worship continued in Baughman Settlement until the 1940s. A Homecoming Service is held each year at the church on the fourth Sunday in June.

=== Exterior ===
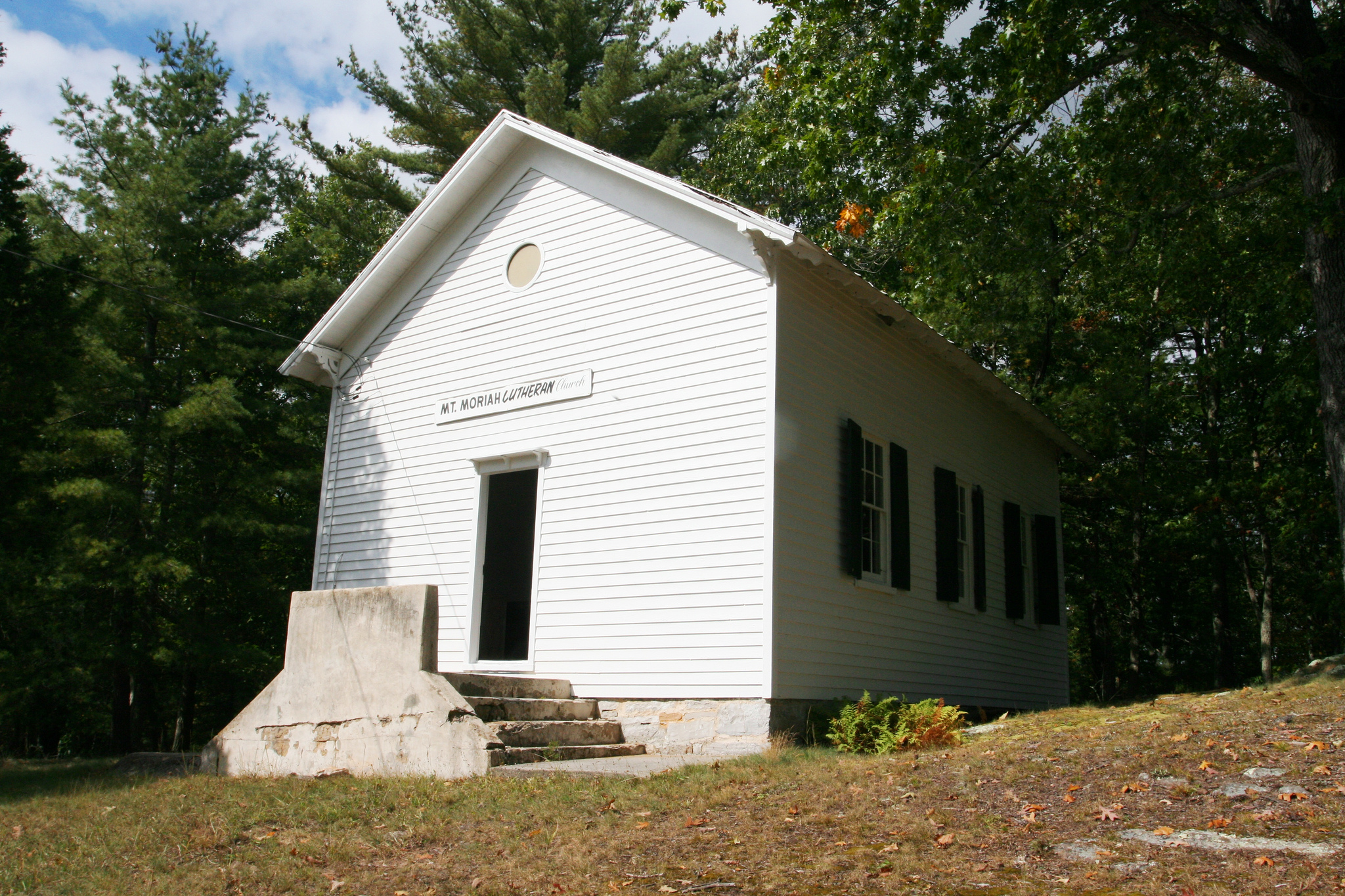
Mount Moriah Lutheran Church

The Mount Moriah Lutheran Church is a frame structure, clad in weatherboards and painted white. The structure sits atop a random stone foundation. The southeast elevation has a central door which is the only entrance into the church. A single, four panel door is hung in the opening and a simple cornice lines the top of the door frame. Above the door, a metal sign displaying the words "Mt. Moriah Lutheran Church" is affixed to the wall. A round window opening is positioned in the center of the gable. The southwest and northeast sides of the church each have three six-over-six double hung windows with shutters. The wide eaves of the gable roof are accented with carved brackets, giving the otherwise vernacular structure a Victorian embellishment. A set of concrete steps is positioned at the front entrance to the church.

=== Interior ===
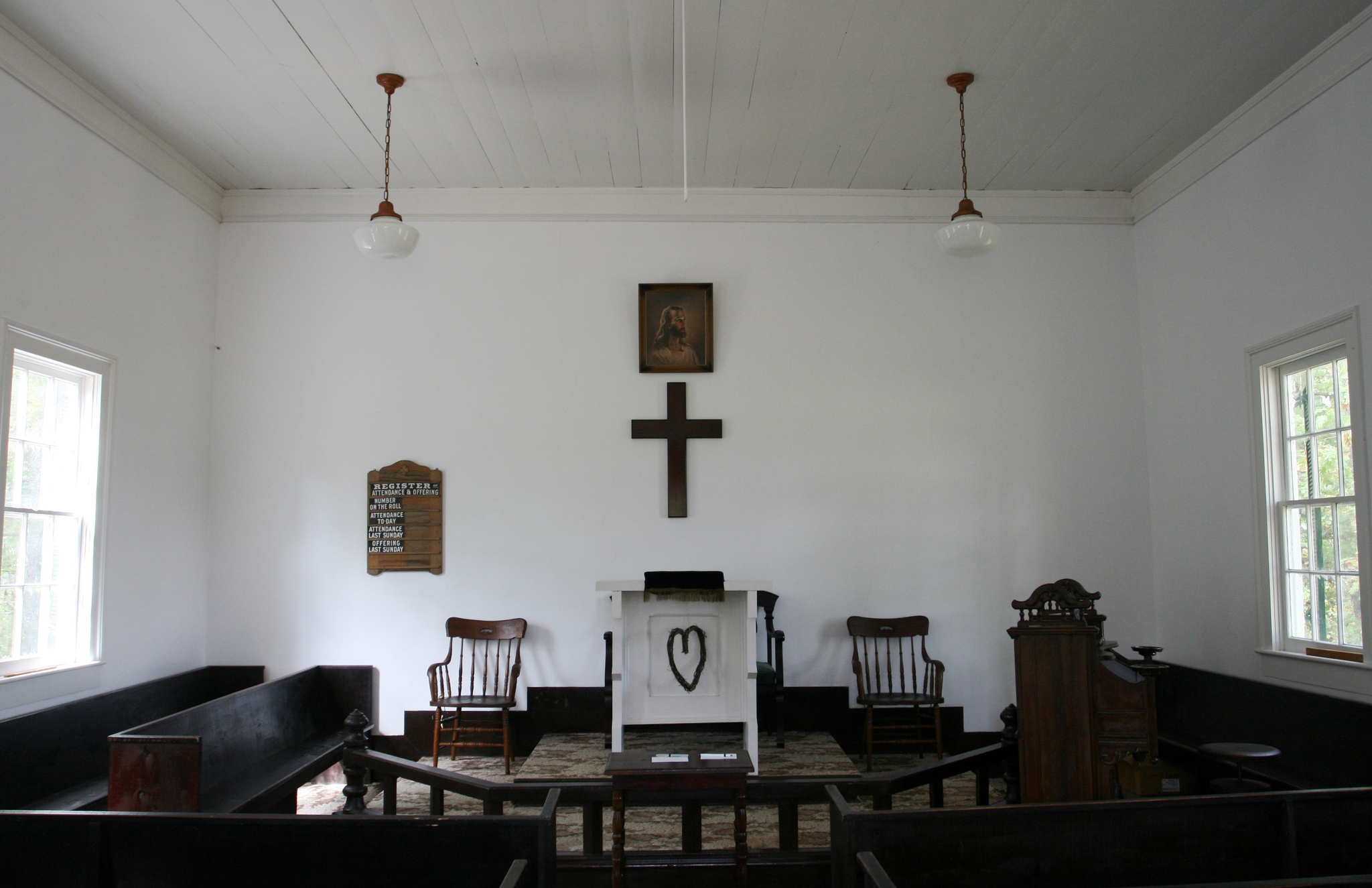
The Interior of Mount Moriah Lutheran Church

Upon entering the church, a single aisle leads through the center of the nave to the chancel, which is centered on the northwest wall of the church. Simple, stained pews fill the nave of the church. The chancel is raised on a pentagonal platform which is surrounded on three sides by a low communion rail with square balusters. The ends of the communion rail are accented with turned balusters. A second square platform is centered atop the lower on which the pulpit is situated. The walls of the church are covered in plaster with a broad base board and milled crown molding. The ceiling is covered with tongue-in-groove boards. A reed organ, produced by the Beckwith Organ Company of Chicago, IL sits to the side of the chancel.
