= Kessel, West Virginia =

- Unincorporated community
- Location within West Virginia Location within the United States
- Coordinates: 39°4′29″N 79°2′11″W
- Country: United States
- State: West Virginia
- County: Hardy
- Time zone: UTC-5 (Eastern (EST))
  - Summer (DST): UTC-4 (EDT)
- GNIS feature ID: 1549772

Kessel is an unincorporated community in Hardy County, West Virginia, United States.
