= Perry, West Virginia =

- Unincorporated community
- Location within West Virginia Location within the United States
- Coordinates: 38°58′17″N 78°40′30″W
- Country: United States
- State: West Virginia
- County: Hardy
- Time zone: UTC-5 (Eastern (EST))
  - Summer (DST): UTC-4 (EDT)
- GNIS feature ID: 1555328

Perry is an unincorporated community in Hardy County, West Virginia, United States. Perry lies in the Trout Run Valley of eastern Hardy County.
