= Arkansas, West Virginia =

Unincorporated community in West Virginia, United States

Arkansaw, West Virginia
- Unincorporated community
- Location within West Virginia Location within the United States
- Coordinates: 39°4′28″N 78°43′45″W
- Country: United States
- State: West Virginia
- County: Hardy
- Time zone: UTC-5 (Eastern (EST))
  - Summer (DST): UTC-4 (EDT)
- GNIS feature ID: 1550114

Arkansaw (sometimes misspelled Arkansas) is an unincorporated community in Hardy County, West Virginia, United States. It is located on Arkansaw Road (County Route 3/2) off West Virginia Route 29.
