= South Branch Valley Railroad =

Railroad in West Virginia, United States

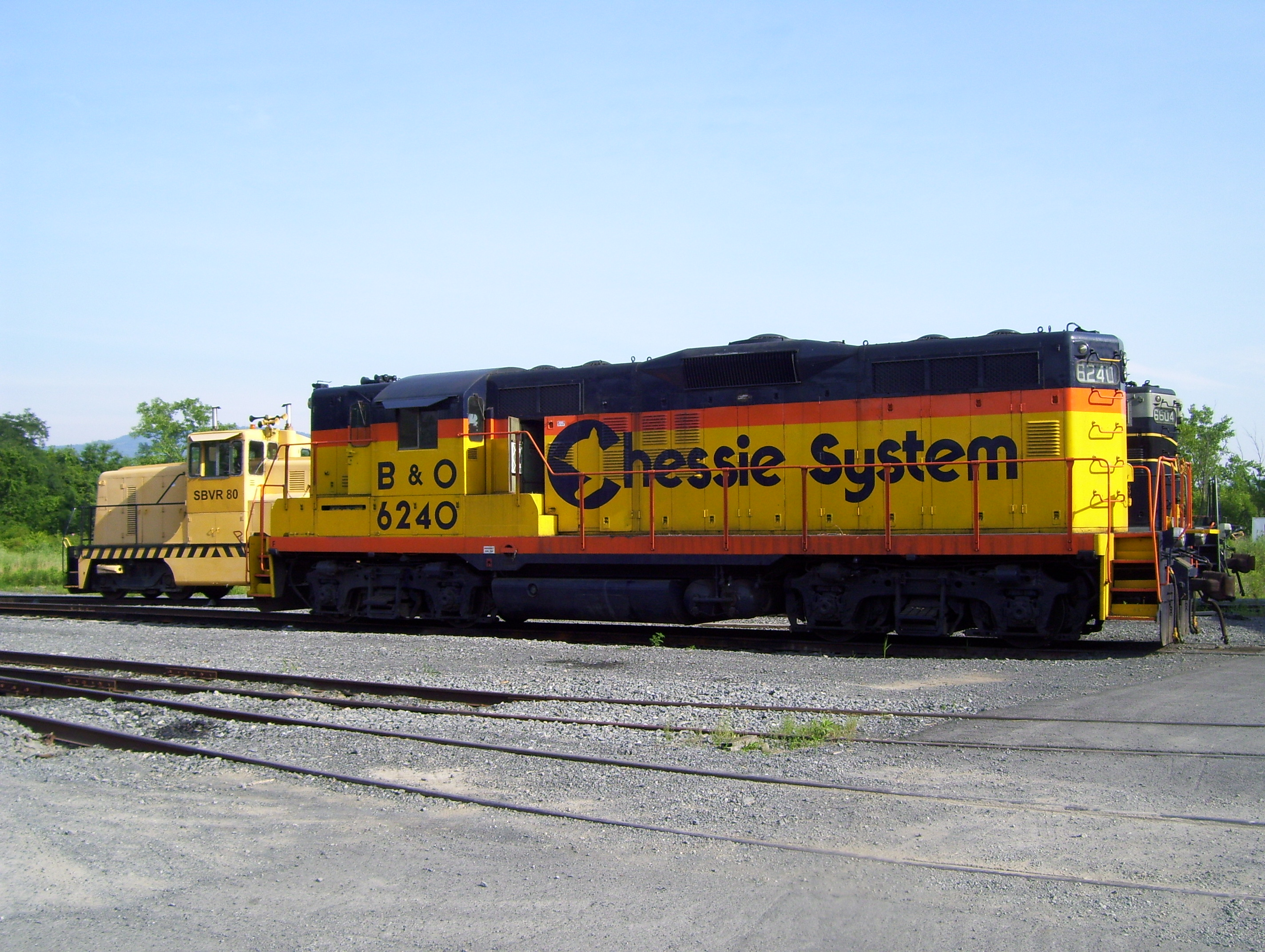
- SBVR #6240, an EMD GP9

Overview
- Headquarters: Moorefield, West Virginia
- Reporting mark: SBVR
- Locale: West Virginia
- Dates of operation: 1978–
- Predecessor: Baltimore and Ohio Railroad

Technical
- Track gauge: 4 ft 8 1/2 in (1,435 mm) standard gauge
- Length: 52.4 miles (84.3 km)

The South Branch Valley Railroad (reporting mark SBVR) is a 52.4-mile-long (84.3 km) railroad in the Eastern Panhandle of West Virginia. The branch line, which parallels the South Branch Potomac River, runs north from Petersburg to Green Spring, where it connects to the national rail network at a junction with the CSX Cumberland Subdivision.

The SBVR is owned and operated by the West Virginia State Rail Authority (SRA), who purchased it from the Baltimore and Ohio Railroad on October 11, 1978. The purchase made West Virginia the first state to both own and operate a commercial freight railroad. The SRA is headquartered along the SBVR in Moorefield.

Most of the SBVR—including its three bridges over the South Branch Potomac River—was destroyed by flooding in 1985. Despite talk of shutting down the railroad after the flood, reconstruction began two years later.

The SBVR is the host line for the Potomac Eagle Scenic Railroad, which is headquartered in Romney.

== History ==
=== West Virginia Railroad Company ===
While the mainline of the Baltimore and Ohio Railroad had already been constructed through Hampshire County in the 1840s along the Potomac River, there existed no rail line linking with the South Branch Potomac River Valley. As early as 1875, a group of Kanawha County businessmen and entrepreneurs formed a company designated the West Virginia Railroad Company. The company's objective was to construct a railroad from the Kentucky border extending across the state to West Virginia's Eastern Panhandle. The line's northern terminus was to be designated a location in close proximity to the South Branch along the Maryland border on the Potomac. Green Spring and South Branch Depot were considered as possible locations for the line's terminus. The company quickly obtained the authority to build its railroad across the state, especially because it would provide improved access to the Eastern Panhandle and Eastern Seaboard for southwestern West Virginia. The company, however, folded a few years later.

=== Cumberland, Moorefield and Petersburg Railroad Company ===
Shortly after the West Virginia Railroad Company folded, businessmen and entrepreneurs in the South Branch Valley sought to take matters in their own hands and build a railroad from Petersburg to Green Spring on the B&O's mainline to Cumberland, Maryland and Martinsburg, West Virginia. This goal was reflected in the company's title: the Cumberland, Moorefield and Petersburg Railroad Company. The company's plans differed from the West Virginia Railroad's in that it planned on connecting Petersburg and not Franklin to the B&O mainline. It was also only concerned with connecting the South Branch Valley to the B&O mainline and not connecting it with the rest of the state. Like its predecessor, the company was unable to get the line built.

=== South Branch Railroad Company ===
The line finally became a reality on September 1, 1884 when it was completed from Romney to Green Spring by the South Branch Railroad Company. The South Branch Railroad Company was another group of local entrepreneurs, including Speaker of the West Virginia House of Delegates Alexander W. Monroe, who were especially concerned with connecting Romney to the B&O mainline because of its key location along the Northwestern Turnpike (today's US 50). While the company intended to extend its railroad south to Petersburg via Moorefield, it did not occur until after the turn of the 20th century. Once again, the task would be up to the local citizens of Hampshire County.

=== Hampshire Southern Railroad Company ===
In 1909, the Hampshire Southern Railroad Company led by William B. Cornwell (brother of Governor John J. Cornwell) of Romney began construction of its rail line south. The construction commenced from the Romney Depot north of town and then proceeded across the property of Valley View farm where a wooden trestle was then constructed across the South Branch. Once it reached the Northwestern Turnpike upstream, another station was opened as the West Romney Station near the mouth of Mill Creek. West Romney Station's post office was later referred to as Vanderlip in honor of a B&O executive following its purchase of Hampshire Southern. Hampshire Southern continued the construction of its line along the western bank of the South Branch through The Trough and into Hardy County. By 1910, the first trains providing freight and passenger service between Romney and Moorefield were in service and the line lay completed from Moorefield to Green Spring. Once the line's construction to Moorefield was fulfilled, Hampshire Southern soon sold the line to the Moorefield and Virginia Railroad Company in 1911.

=== Moorefield and Virginia Railroad Company ===
Once the Moorefield and Virginia Railroad Company acquired the line, the remaining link to Petersburg was completed and the full length of the railroad's course in the South Branch Valley had been finished. William Cornwell, along with Eugene Ailes (son-in-law to John J. Cornwell), retained their interests in the railroad through their grantor company. After a brief ownership, Moorefield and Virginia transferred the line to the Baltimore and Ohio Railroad Company.

=== Baltimore and Ohio Railroad Company ===
The Baltimore and Ohio Railroad Company got a hold of the branch line in 1914. As part of the B&O, the line became known as the South Branch line. Initially its passenger service did well, especially in Hampshire County after schools in the county's western half were consolidated. Students from Green Spring, Springfield, and other points along the B&O line used the train to commute to Romney's senior high school. Passenger service was also popular with those from Petersburg and Moorefield because it allowed a faster and more convenient trip to Cumberland and Martinsburg. However, in the 1930s, the B&O did away with passenger service and focused on freight. The B&O abandoned the line completely in 1978. Out of concern for the region's economy and industries, the state of West Virginia purchased the line.

=== South Branch Valley Railroad ===
The West Virginia State Rail Authority (SRA) purchased the line from the Baltimore and Ohio Railroad on October 11, 1978. Upon purchasing the B&O's South Branch line, West Virginia became the first state in the United States to both own and operate a commercial freight railroad. The state's ownership was almost short lived as a result of major flooding in the South Branch Valley in 1985. This flood destroyed most of the rail line, including all 3 bridges that crossed the South Branch Potomac River. Despite talk of discontinuing the railroad, re-construction began in 1987. With the completion of re-construction efforts on the railroad in 1989, rail service was once again available to the communities which it serves.

The rebirth of the railroad saw the arrival of the valley's Potomac Eagle Scenic Railroad in 1991. Running from Romney's Wappocomo Station on West Virginia Route 28 at Wappocomo farm to Moorefield, the "Eagle" takes tourists on a sight-seeing excursion through the Trough. En route to the Trough, passengers view a number of historic sites, namely Valley View, Stoney Lonesome, Mill Meadow, the community of Vanderlip, the Nathaniel Kuykendall House, and other old plantations and farms that remain in the valley. While in the Trough, passengers view the bald eagles that have made their nesting grounds there, hence the train's name.

== Communities serviced ==
Communities are listed from the southern terminus of the SBVR to its northern terminus on the Potomac. Also included are the B&O's old railroad post and express offices that may or may not have had permanent residents.

=== Grant County, West Virginia ===
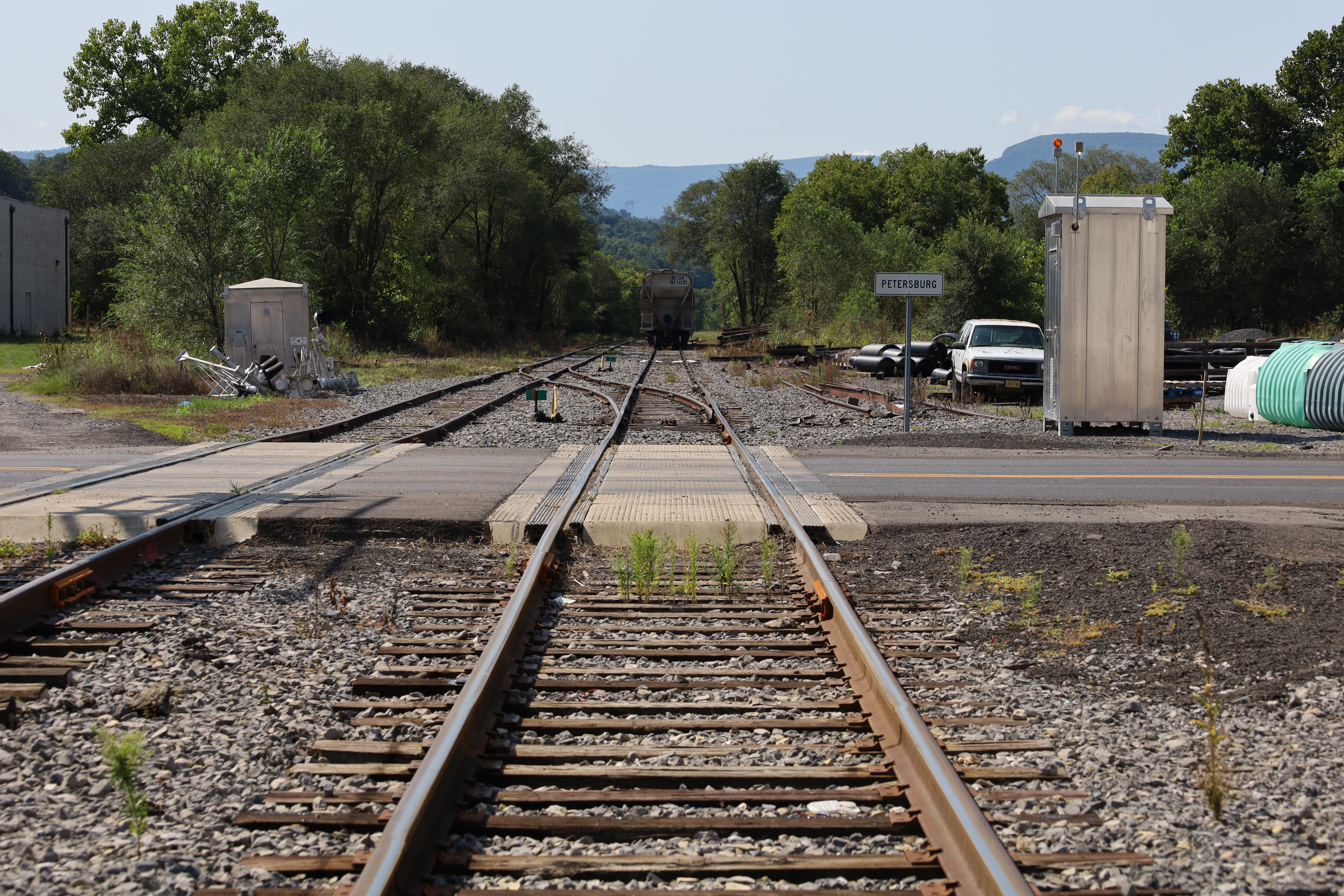
Terminus of the railroad in Petersburg

- Petersburg

=== Hardy County, West Virginia ===
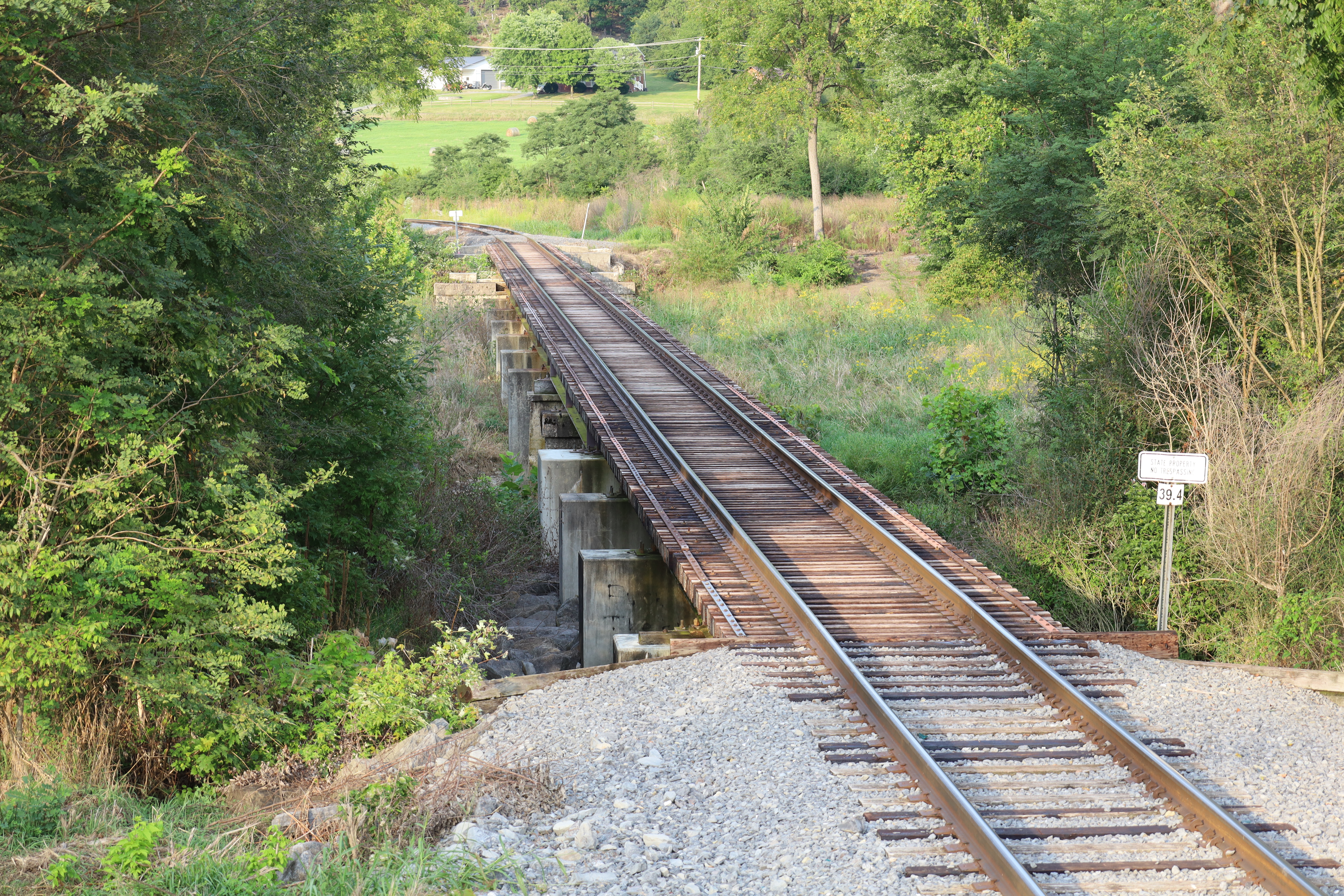
Crossing of the South Fork South Branch Potomac River in 2020

- Durgon
- Taylor
- Moorefield
- Cunningham
- Mapleton
- McNeill

=== Hampshire County, West Virginia ===
- Wickham
- Sector (Post Office)/Glebe Station
- Pancake
- Johnson
- Vanderlip (Post Office)/West Romney Station
- Valley/Romney Depot
- Vance
- Wappocomo
- Ridgedale George W. Washington's farm and its staff
- Ritters
- Grace
- Springfield
- Donaldson
- Millen
- Green Spring
