= Donaldson, Hampshire County, West Virginia =

Unincorporated community in West Virginia, United States

- Unincorporated community
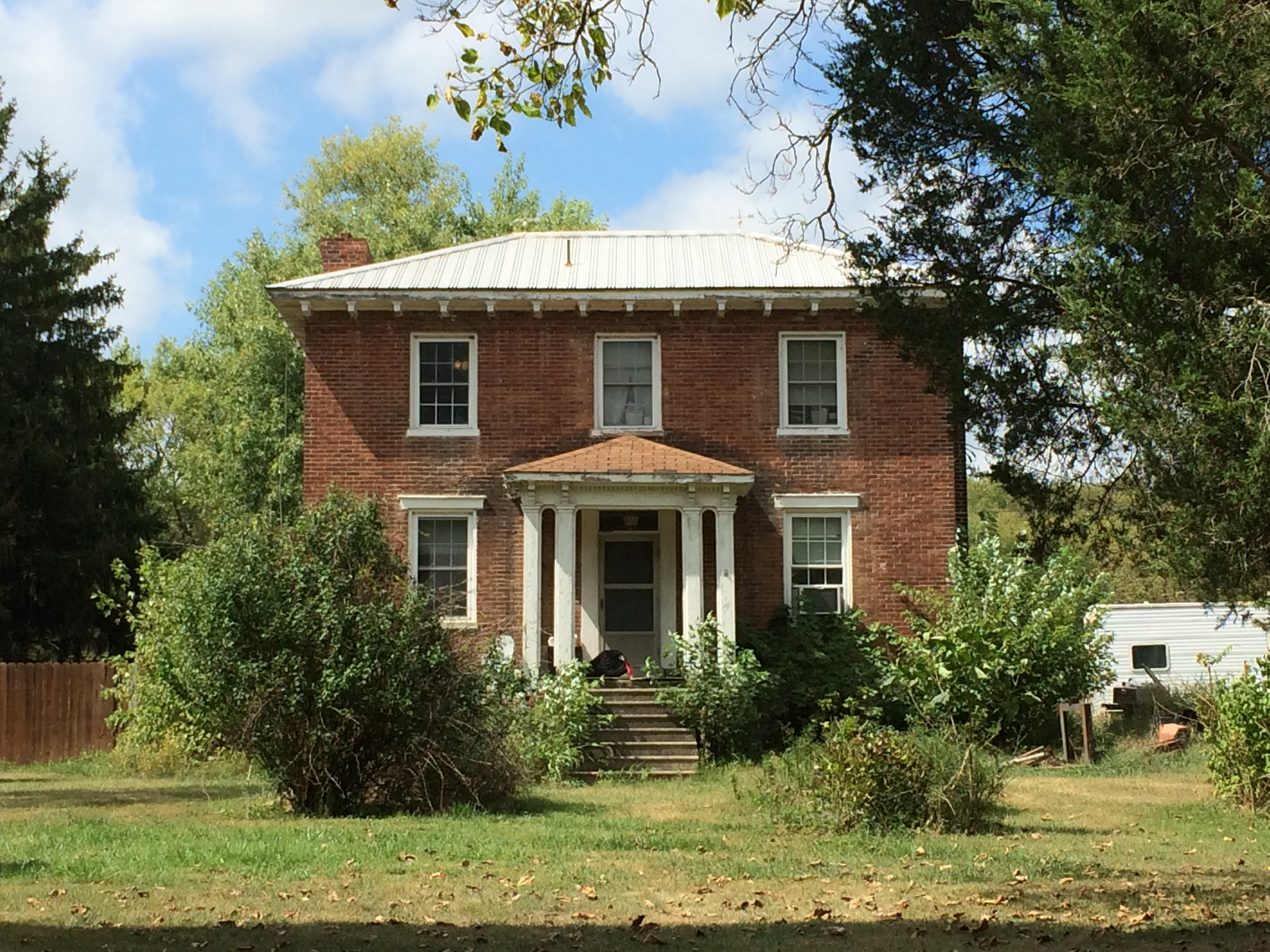
- Gower House (c. 1830s)

- Location within West Virginia Location within the United States
- Coordinates: 39°29′51″N 78°39′16″W
- Country: United States
- State: West Virginia
- County: Hampshire
- Time zone: UTC-5 (Eastern (EST))
  - Summer (DST): UTC-4 (EDT)
- GNIS feature ID: 1554318

Donaldson is an unincorporated community in Hampshire County in the U.S. state of West Virginia. It is located in Green Spring Valley on Green Spring Road (West Virginia Secondary Route 1) between Green Spring and Springfield. Donaldson was once a thriving railroad community along the South Branch Valley Railroad with its own school and post office in operation.
