= The Trough =

Gorge in West Virginia, United States

Coordinates: 39°13′25″N 78°51′27″W

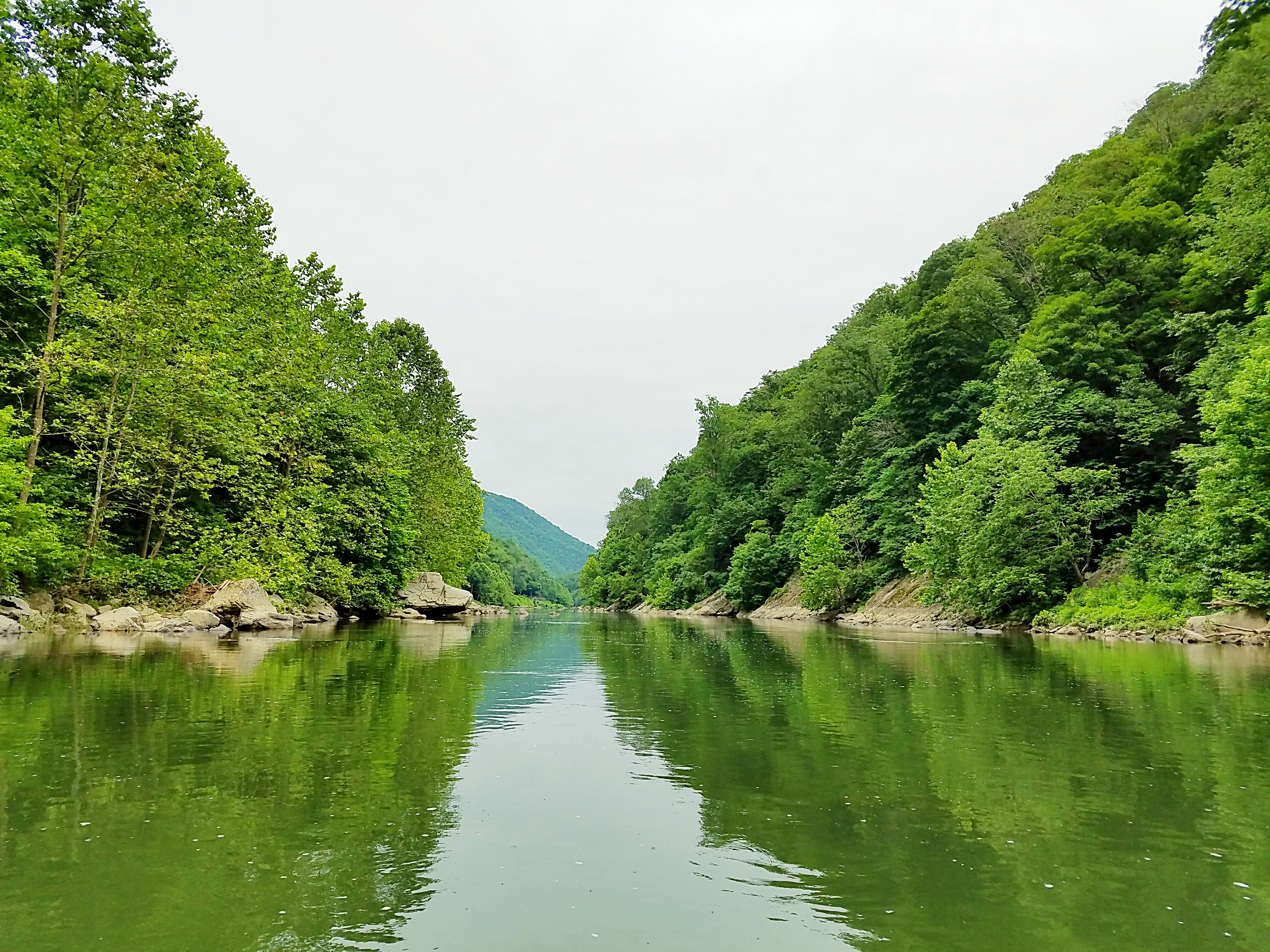
The Trough, photographed on July 3, 2016.

The Trough is a 6-mile-long (9.7 km) wooded gorge carved by the South Branch Potomac River (SBPR) and situated in the Allegheny Mountains of Hampshire and Hardy Counties, West Virginia, US. The area was the site of a 1756 skirmish of the French and Indian War, known as the "Battle of the Trough".

The steep slopes of the Trough are forested primarily with oaks, hickories, Virginia pine, large quantities of paw paw, with several rock outcrops visible on both sides. The two wooded ridges that define The Trough make it inaccessible from either side. Entry into The Trough is only by the South Branch Valley Railroad (the SVBR, along the foot of Mill Creek Mountain), by boat, or on foot.

== Geography ==
The Trough is a narrow valley bounded by Mill Creek Mountain to its west and Sawmill Ridge (1,716 feet) to its east with the SBPR flowing in between them. The Trough's opening is located at the southern slopes of Mill Creek Mountain and Sawmill Ridge at McNeill in Hardy County. Mill Creek Mountain is made up of several steep ridges and knobs while Sawmill Ridge is one long continuous sharp ridge. River Ridge (1,906 feet) is the first of Mill Creek Mountain's ridges to rise over the South Branch. For canoeists, The Trough officially begins at the SBVR’s trestle at Sycamore just below where Stony Run joins the river.

The Trough continues its northwestern course with several bends in the river and large boulders dislocated from the ridges above dotting its shores. The Trough passes into Hampshire County at High Knob (2,648 feet) on Mill Creek Mountain followed by a series of knobs separated by spring gaps. It is at the third spring gap where Wickham was once located at on the railroad. Following Wickham, Mill Creek Mountain's Long Knob (1,725 feet) flanks the Trough. Sawmill Ridge ends at the mouth of the Trough at the point where Sawmill Run descends the ridge and joins the river. The communities of Sector and Glebe are located here to the west and east, respectively. The concrete piers of the old bridge that once carried Fleming-Sector Road (County Route 8/3) connecting these two communities are still visible here as well. A typical Trough canoe run ends at the Harmison's Public Access Site below the old bridge and behind The Trough General Store.

== Recreation ==
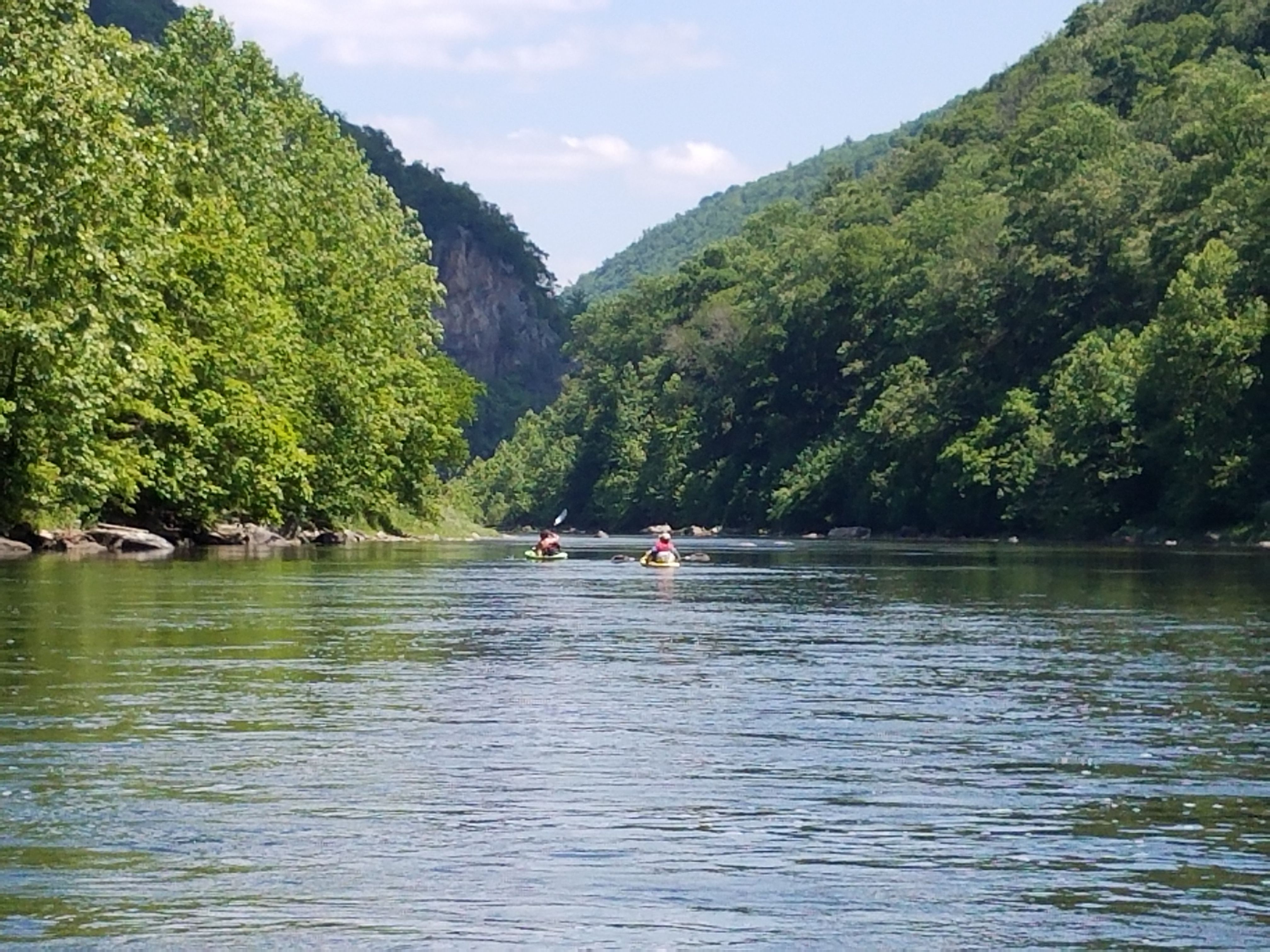
Kayakers Paddling The Trough

The Trough is a popular canoeing/kayaking venue, although not a "true whitewater run" (difficulty level = Class I-II). It is, however, a markedly beautiful stretch of river. The Trough General Store in Glebe at The Trough's mouth offers canoe rentals and shuttles canoers and kayakers to The Trough's opening near McNeill in the South Branch Wildlife Management Area. Several primitive campsites are accessible along this stretch.

The area is well known as a habitat for bald eagles, hence its Potomac Eagle Scenic Railroad sightseeing train on the SBVR. Visitors can board the train at Wappocomo Station on West Virginia Route 28 in Romney.

== See also ==
- Media related to The Trough at Wikimedia Commons
- The Trough at American Whitewater
- South Branch Wildlife Management Area
