= Hardy County, West Virginia =

County in West Virginia, United States

- County
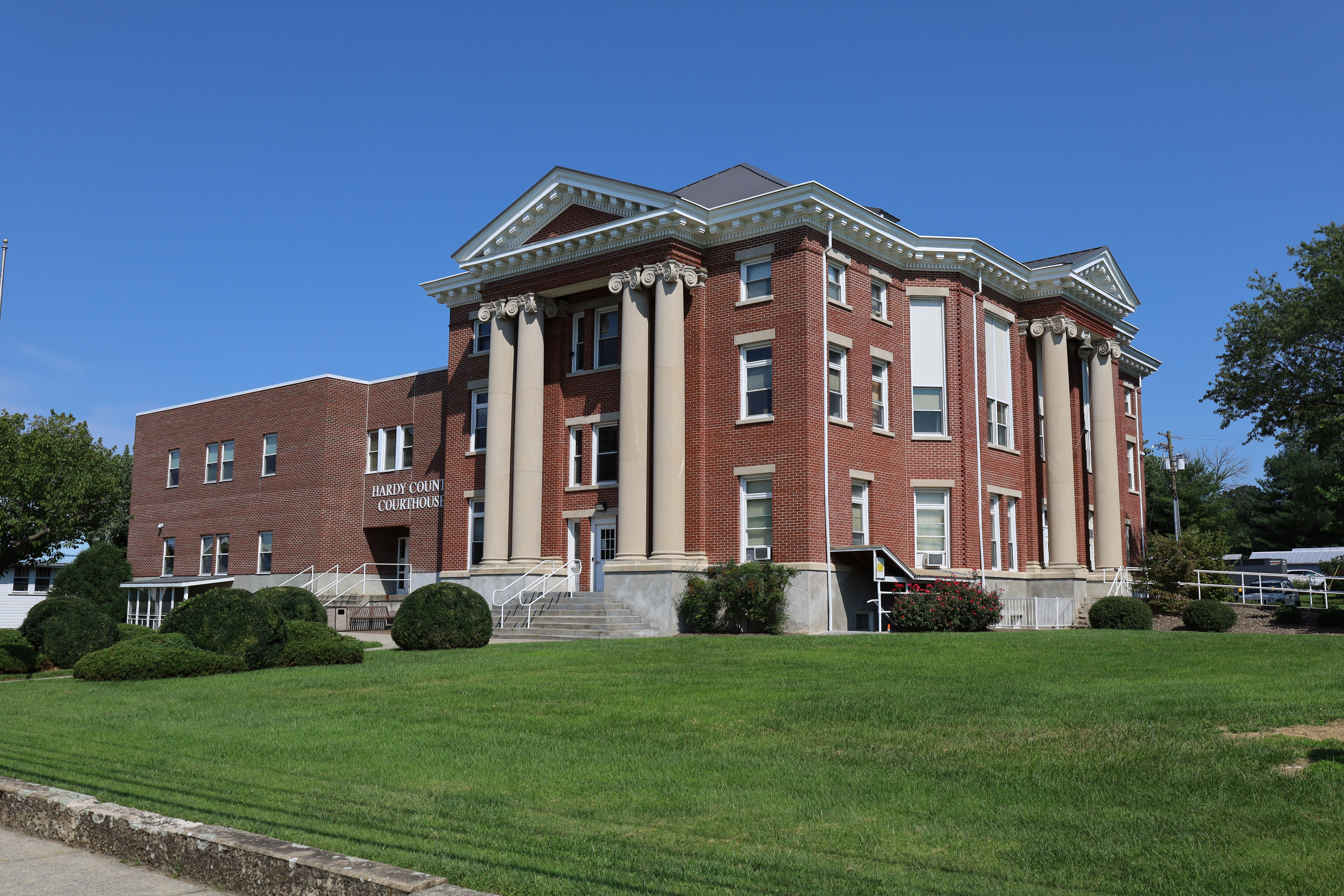
- Hardy County Courthouse

- Logo

- Location within the U.S. state of West Virginia
- Coordinates: 39°01′N 78°52′W
- Country: United States
- State: West Virginia
- Founded: October 17, 1786
- Named for: Samuel Hardy
- Seat: Moorefield
- Largest town: Moorefield

Area
  - Total: 584 sq mi (1,510 km^{2})
  - Land: 582 sq mi (1,510 km^{2})
  - Water: 2.2 sq mi (5.7 km^{2}) 0.4%

Population (2020)
  - Total: 14,299
  - Estimate (2025): 14,337 ▲
  - Density: 24.6/sq mi (9.49/km^{2})
- Time zone: UTC−5 (Eastern)
  - Summer (DST): UTC−4 (EDT)
- Congressional district: 2nd
- Website: www.hardycounty.com

Hardy County is a county in the U.S. state of West Virginia. As of the 2020 census, the population was 14,299. Its county seat is Moorefield. The county was created from Hampshire County in 1786 and named for Samuel Hardy, a distinguished Virginian.

== History ==
The first European known to visit this area was John Van Meter in 1725. The earliest permanent European settlements were established in the 1730s.

Hardy County was formed in 1786 from Hampshire County in Virginia. It was one of fifty counties admitted to the Union as the state of West Virginia in 1863.

That year, the newly independent state's counties were divided into civil townships, with the intention of encouraging local government. This proved impractical in the heavily rural state, and in 1872 the townships were converted into magisterial districts. Hardy County was divided into three districts: Capon, Lost River, and Moorefield. A fourth district, South Fork, was formed in 1873 from part of Moorefield District, and a fifth district, Old Fields, was created in the 1980s.

Hardy County has a rich African American history, with many free African Americans living there before the Civil War. This history is discussed in part 2 of the Henry Louis Gates television series African American Lives.

== Geography ==
According to the United States Census Bureau, the county has a total area of 584 square miles (1,510 km^{2}), of which 582 square miles (1,510 km^{2}) is land and 2.2 square miles (5.7 km^{2}) (0.4%) is water.

Through this county flows the South Branch Potomac River with its surrounding valley. Several miles wide, "the Valley," as it is commonly called, contains lands whose fertility lends itself to successful farming. Agriculture and stock raising have always been the main source of employment in this area, with corn, wheat, apples, peaches, melons, cattle and poultry having important interests. Truck-farming has a vital role, each household possessing its own small garden.

On either side of the Valley are high mountains with rough terrain and heavy timber. Throughout the area wildlife is plentiful, and hunting has always been a major diversion and source of meat supply.

The South Branch is a clear stream, quite wide, and of considerable depth in many places. Watering the Valley, the river abounds in fish and creates many picturesque settings. At times the usually calm waters surge from low banks and spread over the Valley, enveloping and ravishing the rich surrounding lands. The river has a peculiar feature in the field of geology as it flows through the Valley. At one point the river, thousands of years ago, did not cut across the mountains from one side to the other, but made a passage through them from end to end. This geological exception is now in the form of a narrow, trough-like gap, about seven miles (11 km) long, and appropriately called "The Trough". At the present day, the gorge is several hundred feet deep, and the South Branch flows in a narrow channel at the bottom, with almost perpendicular walls of rock on either side.

In the very center of the South Branch Valley, surrounded by high mountains, and located on the east side of the junction of the South Fork South Branch Potomac River and the South Branch Potomac, is Moorefield, the county seat of Hardy County. A quiet farming center in 1860, the population of the Moorefield area at that time was about 1,500. At this period there were no bridges at Moorefield, and the South Branch had to be forded some three miles (4.8 km) up the Valley, or the ferryboat, which was usually busy, had to be used. The main towns that communicated with Moorefield were Petersburg, Romney, and New Creek (presently Keyser) the latter having a stage line between the two points.

=== Major highways ===
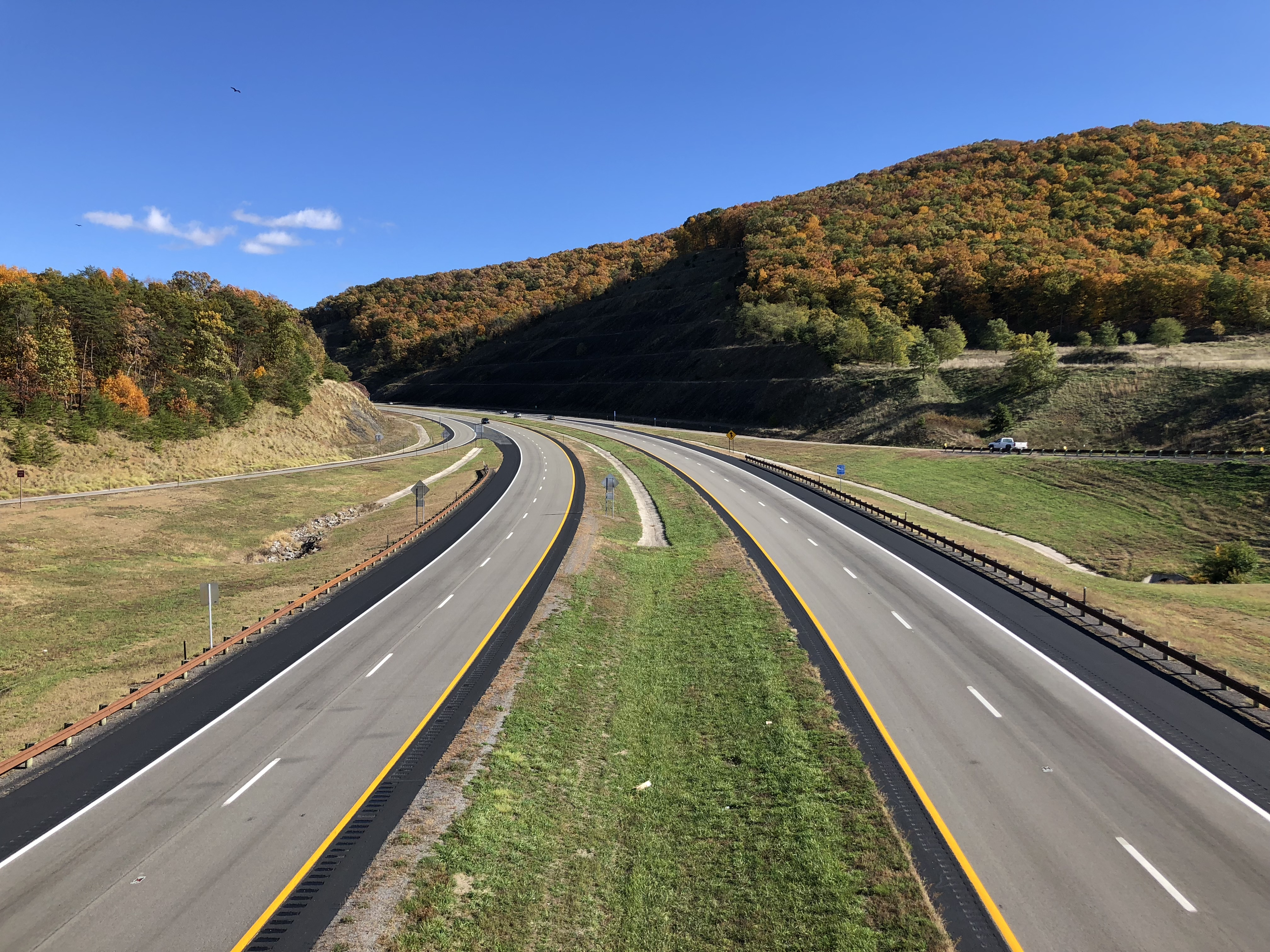
US 48 in Hardy County

- U.S. Highway 48
- U.S. Highway 220
- West Virginia Route 28
- West Virginia Route 29
- West Virginia Route 55
- West Virginia Route 59
- West Virginia Route 259

=== Adjacent counties ===
- Hampshire County (north)
- Frederick County, Virginia (east)
- Shenandoah County, Virginia (southeast)
- Rockingham County, Virginia (south)
- Pendleton County (southwest)
- Grant County (west)

=== National protected areas ===
- George Washington National Forest (part)
- United States National Radio Quiet Zone (part)

== Demographics ==
Historical population
Census	Pop.	Note	%±
1790	7,336		—
1800	6,627		−9.7%
1810	5,525		−16.6%
1820	5,700		3.2%
1830	6,798		19.3%
1840	7,622		12.1%
1850	9,543		25.2%
1860	9,864		3.4%
1870	5,518		−44.1%
1880	6,794		23.1%
1890	7,567		11.4%
1900	8,449		11.7%
1910	9,163		8.5%
1920	9,601		4.8%
1930	9,816		2.2%
1940	10,813		10.2%
1950	10,032		−7.2%
1960	9,308		−7.2%
1970	8,855		−4.9%
1980	10,030		13.3%
1990	10,977		9.4%
2000	12,669		15.4%
2010	14,025		10.7%
2020	14,299		2.0%
2025 (est.)	14,337	▲	0.3%
U.S. Decennial Census; 1790–1960 1900–1990; 1990–2000 2010–2020

=== 2020 census ===
As of the 2020 census, the county had a population of 14,299. Of the residents, 21.1% were under the age of 18 and 21.5% were 65 years of age or older; the median age was 45.9 years. For every 100 females there were 102.7 males, and for every 100 females age 18 and over there were 98.9 males.

The racial makeup of the county was 89.8% White, 2.9% Black or African American, 0.2% American Indian and Alaska Native, 0.4% Asian, 2.3% from some other race, and 4.4% from two or more races. Hispanic or Latino residents of any race comprised 4.6% of the population.

There were 5,993 households in the county, of which 26.7% had children under the age of 18 living with them and 24.5% had a female householder with no spouse or partner present. About 29.4% of all households were made up of individuals and 14.2% had someone living alone who was 65 years of age or older.

There were 8,127 housing units, of which 26.3% were vacant. Among occupied housing units, 74.2% were owner-occupied and 25.8% were renter-occupied. The homeowner vacancy rate was 1.7% and the rental vacancy rate was 8.6%.

Hardy County, West Virginia – Racial and ethnic composition Note: the US Census treats Hispanic/Latino as an ethnic category. This table excludes Latinos from the racial categories and assigns them to a separate category. Hispanics/Latinos may be of any race.
Race / Ethnicity (NH = Non-Hispanic)	Pop 2000	Pop 2010	Pop 2020	% 2000	% 2010	% 2020
White alone (NH)	12,225	12,936	12,685	96.49%	92.23%	88.71%
Black or African American alone (NH)	230	327	403	1.81%	2.33%	2.81%
Native American or Alaska Native alone (NH)	20	24	16	0.15%	0.17%	0.11%
Asian alone (NH)	17	142	53	0.13%	1.01%	0.37%
Pacific Islander alone (NH)	0	0	0	0.00%	0.00%	0.00%
Other race alone (NH)	16	10	31	0.12%	0.07%	0.21%
Mixed race or Multiracial (NH)	77	108	452	0.60%	0.77%	3.16%
Hispanic or Latino (any race)	84	478	659	0.66%	3.40%	4.60%
Total	12,669	14,025	14,299	100.00%	100.00%	100.00%

=== 2010 census ===
As of the 2010 United States census, there were 14,025 people, 5,818 households, and 3,900 families living in the county. The population density was 24.1 inhabitants per square mile (9.3/km^{2}). There were 8,078 housing units at an average density of 13.9 units per square mile (5.4 units/km^{2}). The racial makeup of the county was 93.8% white, 2.5% black or African American, 1.0% Asian, 0.2% American Indian, 1.5% from other races, and 1.0% from two or more races. Those of Hispanic or Latino origin made up 3.4% of the population. In terms of ancestry, 42.7% were German, 13.2% were English, 11.0% were American, and 9.9% were Irish.

Of the 5,818 households, 29.0% had children under the age of 18 living with them, 52.0% were married couples living together, 10.0% had a female householder with no husband present, 33.0% were non-families, and 27.0% of all households were made up of individuals. The average household size was 2.40 and the average family size was 2.86. The median age was 42.8 years.

The median income for a household in the county was $31,347 and the median income for a family was $41,401. Males had a median income of $37,506 versus $23,865 for females. The per capita income for the county was $16,944. About 11.1% of families and 14.9% of the population were below the poverty line, including 21.9% of those under age 18 and 14.0% of those age 65 or over.

=== 2000 census ===
As of the census of 2000, there were 12,669 people, 5,204 households, and 3,564 families living in the county. The population density was 22 people per square mile (8.5 people/km^{2}). There were 7,115 housing units at an average density of 12 units per square mile (4.6 units/km^{2}). The racial makeup of the county was 96.87% White, 1.93% Black or African American, 0.16% Native American, 0.14% Asian, 0.23% from other races, and 0.67% from two or more races. 0.66% of the population were Hispanic or Latino of any race.

There were 5,204 households, out of which 29.60% had children under the age of 18 living with them, 56.10% were married couples living together, 8.60% had a female householder with no husband present, and 31.50% were non-families. 27.00% of all households were made up of individuals, and 12.20% had someone living alone who was 65 years of age or older. The average household size was 2.42 and the average family size was 2.92.

In the county, the population was spread out, with 23.30% under the age of 18, 7.60% from 18 to 24, 28.80% from 25 to 44, 25.40% from 45 to 64, and 14.90% who were 65 years of age or older. The median age was 39 years. For every 100 females there were 97.50 males. For every 100 females age 18 and over, there were 96.70 males.

The median income for a household in the county was $31,846, and the median income for a family was $37,003. Males had a median income of $28,032 versus $18,798 for females. The per capita income for the county was $15,859. About 10.50% of families and 13.10% of the population were below the poverty line, including 13.10% of those under age 18 and 20.20% of those age 65 or over.

== Politics ==
During the Virginia Secession Convention, Hardy County voted against secession from the United States, but much of this vote was within fiercely Unionist and overwhelmingly Republican Grant County, which was detached from it after the war. Following the detachment of Grant – which was frequently to be among the nation's most Republican counties in the subsequent century and a half – Hardy County became solidly Democratic, not voting for any Republican candidate between 1868 and 1964 inclusive. However, since 1968, Hardy County has voted for the Republican presidential candidate in every election with the exceptions of Jimmy Carter in 1976 and Bill Clinton in 1996. Since 2000, it has seen the same significant increase in Republican support as the rest of socially conservative West Virginia.

United States presidential election results for Hardy County, West Virginia
Year	Republican		Democratic		Third party(ies)	
Year	No.	%	No.	%	No.	%
1912	344	18.36%	1,209	64.51%	321	17.13%
1916	701	32.88%	1,425	66.84%	6	0.28%
1920	1,354	40.12%	2,014	59.67%	7	0.21%
1924	1,272	33.92%	2,442	65.12%	36	0.96%
1928	1,611	44.97%	1,965	54.86%	6	0.17%
1932	1,267	30.78%	2,824	68.61%	25	0.61%
1936	1,581	34.81%	2,956	65.08%	5	0.11%
1940	1,674	38.36%	2,690	61.64%	0	0.00%
1944	1,489	41.36%	2,111	58.64%	0	0.00%
1948	1,433	36.95%	2,435	62.79%	10	0.26%
1952	2,037	45.80%	2,411	54.20%	0	0.00%
1956	2,202	49.36%	2,259	50.64%	0	0.00%
1960	2,042	45.31%	2,465	54.69%	0	0.00%
1964	1,308	30.39%	2,996	69.61%	0	0.00%
1968	1,768	43.93%	1,767	43.90%	490	12.17%
1972	2,609	63.34%	1,510	36.66%	0	0.00%
1976	1,858	38.30%	2,993	61.70%	0	0.00%
1980	2,329	51.77%	2,050	45.57%	120	2.67%
1984	2,938	64.05%	1,641	35.78%	8	0.17%
1988	2,581	60.19%	1,689	39.39%	18	0.42%
1992	2,144	45.90%	1,917	41.04%	610	13.06%
1996	1,895	44.49%	1,911	44.87%	453	10.64%
2000	2,816	62.38%	1,621	35.91%	77	1.71%
2004	3,635	68.90%	1,617	30.65%	24	0.45%
2008	3,376	62.44%	1,901	35.16%	130	2.40%
2012	3,536	68.25%	1,482	28.60%	163	3.15%
2016	4,274	75.33%	1,155	20.36%	245	4.32%
2020	4,859	76.73%	1,381	21.81%	93	1.47%
2024	4,997	77.94%	1,297	20.23%	117	1.82%

== Communities ==
=== Towns ===
- Moorefield (county seat)
- Wardensville

=== Magisterial Districts ===
- Capon
- Lost River
- Moorefield
- Old Fields
- South Fork

=== Unincorporated communities ===
- Arkansas
- Baker
- Basore
- Bass
- Baughman Settlement
- Bean Settlement
- Brake
- Cunningham
- Durgon
- Fisher
- Flats
- Fort Run
- Inkerman
- Kessel
- Lost City
- Lost River
- Mathias
- McCauley
- McNeill
- Milam
- Needmore
- Old Fields
- Perry
- Peru
- Rig
- Rock Oak
- Rockland
- Tannery
- Taylor
- Walnut Bottom

== See also ==
- Hardy County Schools
- Lost River State Park
- National Register of Historic Places listings in Hardy County, West Virginia
- South Branch Wildlife Management Area
