= Taylor, West Virginia =

- Unincorporated community
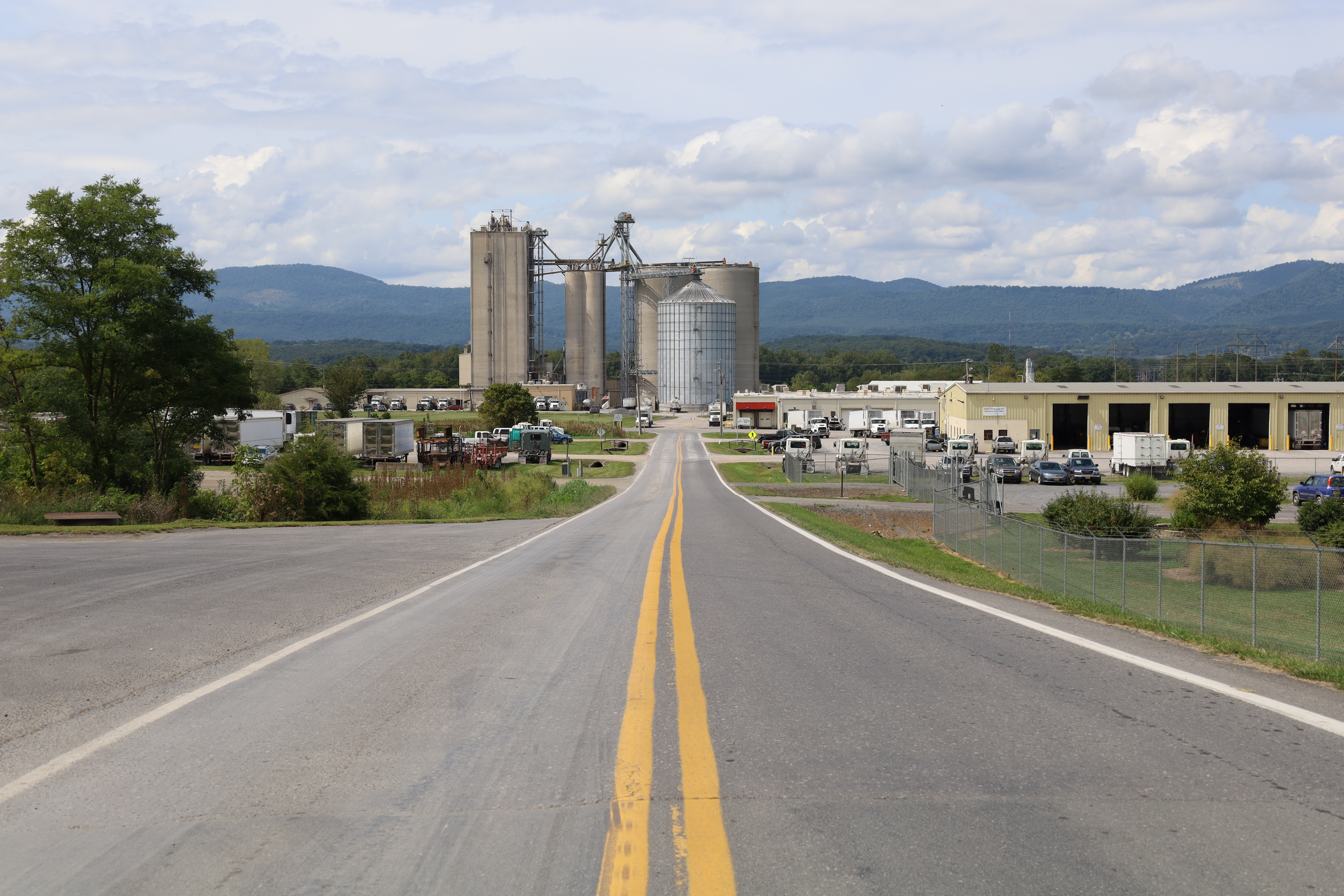

- Location within West Virginia Location within the United States
- Coordinates: 39°2′49″N 78°58′47″W
- Country: United States
- State: West Virginia
- County: Hardy
- Time zone: UTC-5 (Eastern (EST))
  - Summer (DST): UTC-4 (EDT)
- GNIS feature ID: 1555786

Taylor is an unincorporated community in Hardy County, West Virginia, United States. Taylor is located south of Moorefield on West Virginia Route 28/U.S. Route 220 between the South Branch Potomac and South Fork South Branch Potomac rivers.
