= Wickham, Hampshire County, West Virginia =

- Unincorporated community
- Location within West Virginia Location within the United States
- Coordinates: 39°12′44″N 78°52′6″W
- Country: United States
- State: West Virginia
- County: Hampshire
- Time zone: UTC-5 (Eastern (EST))
  - Summer (DST): UTC-4 (EDT)
- GNIS feature ID: 1555980

Wickham is an extinct unincorporated community in Hampshire County in the U.S. state of West Virginia. It originally developed as a stop on the South Branch Valley Railroad in the Trough. Wickham is located within a gap in Mill Creek Mountain on the South Branch Potomac River. One white clapboard structure remains of the community.
