= Vanderlip, West Virginia =

- Unincorporated community
- Location within West Virginia Location within the United States
- Coordinates: 39°20′14″N 78°47′4″W
- Country: United States
- State: West Virginia
- County: Hampshire
- Time zone: UTC-5 (Eastern (EST))
  - Summer (DST): UTC-4 (EDT)
- GNIS feature ID: 1718730

Vanderlip is an unincorporated community in Hampshire County in the U.S. state of West Virginia. Vanderlip is located west of Romney along the Northwestern Turnpike (U.S. Route 50) and the South Branch Valley Railroad. At times the community was referred to as West Romney Station, while its post office used the name Vanderlip, after a Baltimore and Ohio Railroad executive. The "heart" of Vanderlip is centered between Vanderlip Drive and Ozark Hill Road.

The community was named after Frank A. Vanderlip, a railroad banker.
