= Green Spring, West Virginia =

- Census-designated place (CDP)
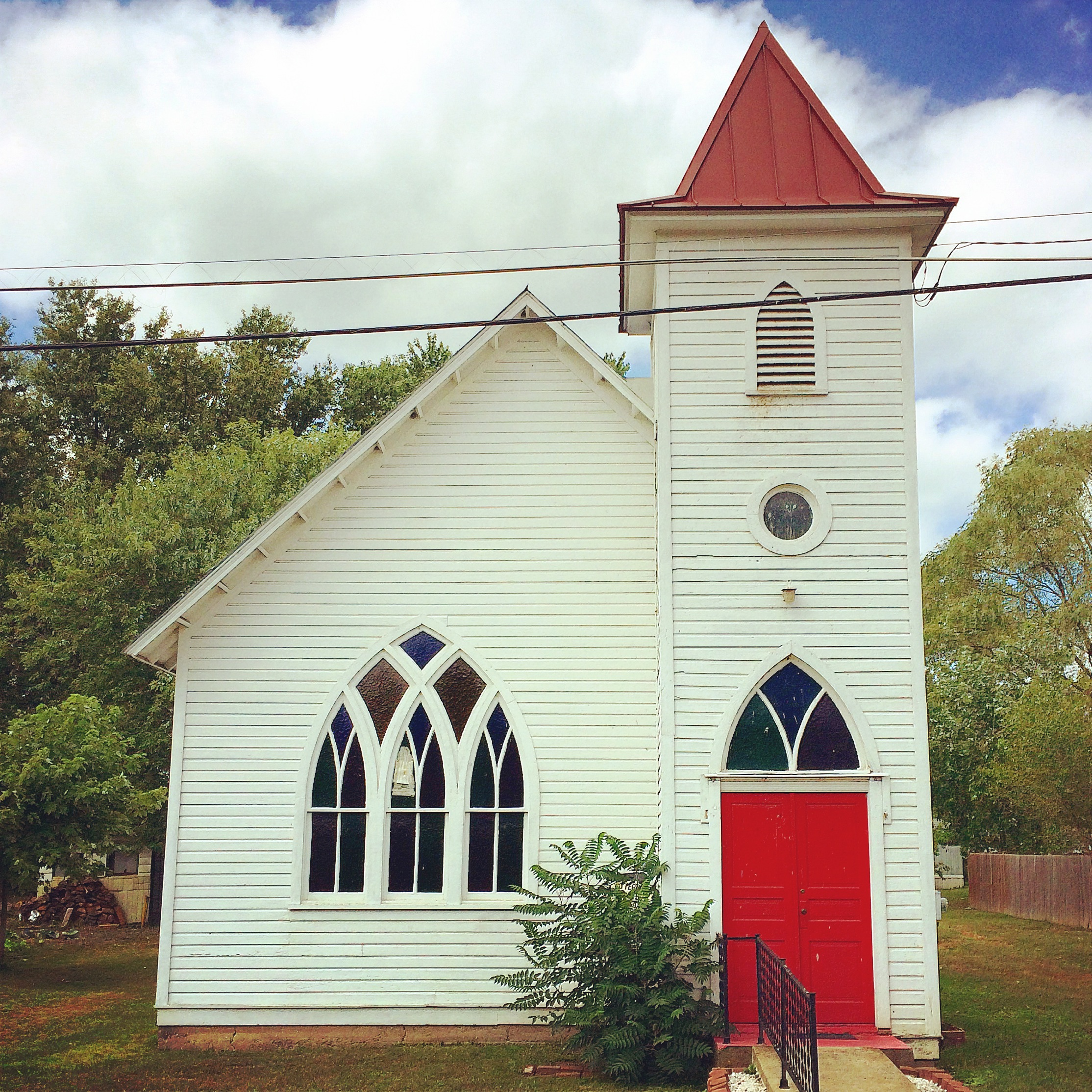
- Otterbein United Methodist Church

- Location of Green Spring in West Virginia
- Coordinates: 39°31′36″N 78°37′28″W
- Country: United States
- State: West Virginia
- County: Hampshire

Area
  - Total: 2.198 sq mi (5.69 km^{2})
  - Land: 2.197 sq mi (5.69 km^{2})
  - Water: 0.001 sq mi (0.0026 km^{2})
- Elevation: 646 ft (197 m)

Population (2020)
  - Total: 250
  - Density: 110/sq mi (44/km^{2})
- Time zone: UTC-5 (Eastern (EST))
  - Summer (DST): UTC-4 (EDT)
- ZIP Code: 26722
- Area code: 304
- GNIS feature ID: 2586819

Green Spring is a census-designated place (CDP) and railroad town in Hampshire County, West Virginia, United States. As of the 2020 census, its population was 250 (down from 218 at the 2010 census). Green Spring is located north of Springfield on Green Spring Road (West Virginia Secondary Route 1) near the confluence of the North and South Branches of the Potomac River. Green Spring is also the location of the South Branch Valley Railroad's terminus with the old Baltimore and Ohio Railroad mainline. Green Spring is the site of a one-lane low-water toll bridge that connects Green Spring Road (West Virginia Secondary Route 1) to Maryland Route 51 in Oldtown, Allegany County, Maryland. This bridge is one of only 17 privately owned toll bridges in the United States. The toll for the bridge is currently US$1.50.

== History ==
The town of Green Spring came into importance in 1819 when the Virginia General Assembly provided for a "public warehouse for the receipt of tobacco be established at Romney warehouse and at Cresap's warehouse at the confluence of the North and South Branches of the Potomac in Hampshire County."

John Jeremiah Jacob (1829–1893) was born in Green Spring December 9, 1829. Jacob was a member of the West Virginia House of Delegates from Hampshire County in 1869 and Governor of West Virginia from 1871 to 1877. Jacob died in Wheeling on November 24, 1893, and is interred at Indian Mound Cemetery in Romney.

The Green Spring Train Station (1882–1885) remains one of the town's most important historic sites.

== Parks and recreation ==
- Green Spring Recreational Park, Green Spring Road (CR 1)
- '"House of the Setting Sun and Haunted Barn"', 1313 Screamin' Hollow Lane, Buck Way

== Churches ==
- Green Spring Assembly of God, Norton Street
- Otterbein United Methodist Church, Norton Street
