= List of placenames in Hampshire County, West Virginia =

This is a complete list of placenames in Hampshire County, West Virginia. Placename entries are compiled from the United States Geological Survey's Geographic Names Information System.

== Hampshire County placenames ==
Placename	Class	Latitude	Longitude	USGS Map	Elevation (Ft)
Abernathy Run	Stream	392619N	0784028W	Springfield	597
Allen Run	Stream	392257N	0784603W	Headsville	778
Arnold Ford	Crossing	391341N	0782728W	Capon Springs	827
Augusta	Populated Place	391743N	0783816W	Augusta	1296
Augusta Elementary School	School	391735N	0783825W	Augusta	1325
Augusta Post Office	Post Office	391753N	0783756W	Augusta	1220
Bache Post Office (historical)	Post Office			Hanging Rock	
Baker Mountain	Summit	390945N	0783325W	Yellow Spring	2024
Barnes Mill	Populated Place	392104N	0783811W	Augusta	919
Barnes Mills Post Office (historical)	Post Office			Augusta	
Beall Spring	Spring	391252N	0783300W	Yellow Spring	1325
Bear Garden Mountain	Summit	391953N	0782342W	Capon Bridge	1572
Bear Ridge	Summit	390805N	0782817W	Capon Springs	1598
Bearwallow Creek	Stream	391841N	0783729W	Hanging Rock	1207
Beaver Run	Stream	392332N	0785056W	Headsville	699
Bell Hollow	Valley	391806N	0783931W	Augusta	1047
Belt Post Office (historical)	Post Office			Augusta	
Bens Knob	Summit	391528N	0783133W	Hanging Rock	2028
Bens Knob Lookout Tower	Locale	391528N	0783133W	Hanging Rock	2028
Bethel Cemetery	Cemetery	391707N	0784329W	Augusta	1493
Bethel Church	Church	391054N	0784336W	Rio	1526
Bethel Church	Church	391706N	0784327W	Augusta	1483
Bethel Church	Church	392953N	0782947W	Largent	594
Bethel Schoolhouse (historical)	School	391057N	0784333W	Rio	1509
Bethesda Church (historical)	Church	391545N	0784848W	Romney	738
Big Hollow	Valley	390809N	0782631W	Capon Springs	2123
Big Ridge	Ridge	390637N	0783756W	Baker	1975
Big Run	Stream	392150N	0784521W	Romney	620
Big Run	Stream	393228N	0782632W	Paw Paw	492
Bills Pond	Lake	392613N	0782109W	Ridge	2533
Birch Hollow	Valley	392513N	0783513W	Levels	833
Bird Ridge	Ridge	392822N	0783529W	Levels	1132
Bitner Spring	Spring	392005N	0783004W	Hanging Rock	866
Bloomery	Populated Place	392313N	0782223W	Ridge	1027
Bloomery Magisterial District	Civil	392353N	0782542W	Largent	692
Bloomery Post Office	Post Office	392306N	0782220W	Ridge	1020
Bloomery Presbyterian Church	Church	392314N	0782225W	Ridge	1030
Bloomery Run	Stream	392408N	0782501W	Largent	679
Bloomery School (historical)	School	392206N	0782224W	Gore	1168
Blue Ford	Crossing	392932N	0783631W	Levels	564
Blues Beach	Populated Place	392533N	0784255W	Springfield	650
Boone Farms Lake Dam	Dam	391812N	0783859W	Augusta	1165
Bore Spring	Spring	392006N	0782527W	Capon Bridge	781
Bowers Run	Stream	392706N	0782513W	Largent	604
Braddock School (historical)	School	392456N	0783002W	Levels	1263
Branch Mountain Methodist Church	Church	392507N	0783913W	Springfield	925
Brights Hollow	Valley	393123N	0783124W	Oldtown	558
Brights Hollow School (historical)	School			Oldtown	
Broad Hollow	Valley	393157N	0784211W	Patterson Creek	633
Broad Run	Stream	392511N	0784505W	Headsville	650
Broadway School (historical)	School	392048N	0782123W	Gore	1142
Brushy Ridge	Ridge	391520N	0783459W	Hanging Rock	1286
Brushy Run	Stream	391240N	0785117W	Sector	778
Bryn [Bryan] School (historical)	School	391550N	0783936W	Augusta	1384
Bubbling Spring	Spring	391515N	0782727W	Capon Bridge	827
Bubbling Spring	Populated Place	391515N	0782729W	Capon Bridge	843
Buck Ridge	Ridge	392732N	0784303W	Springfield	1148
Buffalo Creek	Stream	392232N	0784425W	Springfield	646
Buffalo Gap Camp	Locale	392006N	0782731W	Capon Bridge	1056
Buffalo Gap Spring	Spring	392000N	0782724W	Capon Bridge	958
Buffalo Run	Stream	391549N	0784926W	Romney	679
Butchers Knob	Summit	391731N	0782942W	Capon Bridge	1788
Cacapehon	Populated Place	392954N	0782943W	Largent	564
Cacapon Mountain	Ridge	392637N	0782049W	Ridge	2618
Cacapon Mountain	Summit	391140N	0783132W	Yellow Spring	1893
Cacapon River	Stream	393713N	0781658W	Great Cacapon	420
Camp Green Briar	Locale	391311N	0782724W	Capon Springs	1010
Camp Rim Rock	Locale	391228N	0782935W	Capon Springs	892
Camp Run	Stream	391840N	0784102W	Augusta	1115
Camp Run	Stream	391715N	0785325W	Burlington	837
Camp Tall Timbers	Locale	391236N	0782744W	Capon Springs	1112
Camp White Mountain	Locale	391345N	0782759W	Capon Springs	925
Camp White Rock	Locale	391640N	0782647W	Capon Bridge	820
Capon Bridge	Populated Place	391753N	0782610W	Capon Bridge	797
Capon Bridge Elementary School	School	391807N	0782611W	Capon Bridge	837
Capon Bridge Junior High School	School	391757N	0782609W	Capon Bridge	823
Capon Bridge Normal School (historical)	School			Capon Bridge	
Capon Bridge Post Office	Post Office			Capon Bridge	
Capon Bridge Public Library	Building			Capon Bridge	
Capon Chapel	Church	391611N	0782640W	Capon Bridge	853
Capon Chapel Cemetery	Cemetery	391611N	0782638W	Capon Bridge	866
Capon Chapel Church of the Brethren	Church	392706N	0783226W	Levels	738
Capon Lake	Populated Place	390921N	0783216W	Yellow Spring	928
Capon Lake Farm Spring	Spring	390915N	0783223W	Yellow Spring	968
Capon Magisterial District	Civil	391138N	0783001W	Yellow Spring	876
Capon School	School	391127N	0782719W	Capon Springs	1230
Capon Springs	Populated Place	390810N	0782904W	Capon Springs	1152
Capon Springs	Spring	390745N	0782821W	Capon Springs	1463
Capon Springs Post Office	Post Office	390825N	0782912W	Capon Springs	1234
Capon Springs Run	Stream	390930N	0783204W	Yellow Spring	892
Capon Springs Station (historical)	Populated Place	390904N	0783109W	Yellow Spring	942
Castle Mountain	Summit	392337N	0782507W	Largent	1260
Castle Rock	Pillar	392254N	0782544W	Largent	1070
Castle Run	Stream	392401N	0782541W	Largent	679
Central School (historical)	School	391522N	0783548W	Hanging Rock	1335
Central United Methodist Church	Church	391645N	0783038W	Hanging Rock	1480
Cherry Hill	Summit	392924N	0783224W	Levels	1152
Chestnut Grove School (historical)	School	392020N	0784308W	Augusta	1473
Chestnut Oak Ridge	Ridge	392011N	0783702W	Hanging Rock	1696
Chimney Hollow	Valley	392928N	0783108W	Levels	633
Chine Spring Knob	Summit	392044N	0782031W	Gore	1306
Christian Church	Church	391334N	0782604W	Capon Springs	1165
Church of Christ	Church	392041N	0784519W	Romney	823
Cleveland School (historical)	School	392604N	0783706W	Levels	1201
Cleveland School (historical)	School	391856N	0784244W	Augusta	1591
Clifford Parker Spring	Spring	391901N	0784929W	Romney	886
Cold Spring	Spring	391027N	0782958W	Capon Springs	1020
Cold Spring	Spring	390924N	0783214W	Yellow Spring	928
Cold Stream	Stream	392023N	0782558W	Capon Bridge	781
Cold Stream	Populated Place	392022N	0782631W	Capon Bridge	892
Cold Stream Post Office (historical)	Post Office			Capon Bridge	
Cold Stream Run Spring	Spring	392006N	0782657W	Capon Bridge	892
Cold Stream School (historical)	School	391942N	0782554W	Capon Bridge	801
Concord Post Office (historical)	Post Office			Capon Springs	
Cooper Mountain	Summit	391528N	0783133W	Hanging Rock	2028
Corduroy Hollow	Valley	393030N	0783843W	Patterson Creek	640
Core Run	Stream	391938N	0784748W	Romney	745
Cornwell School	School	392655N	0783552W	Levels	1250
Cornwell School (historical)	School	392255N	0784007W	Springfield	1388
Craig Spring	Spring	392006N	0783003W	Hanging Rock	846
Creekvale	Populated Place	392549N	0783304W	Levels	722
Creekvale Post Office (historical)	Post Office			Levels	
Critton Post Office (historical)	Post Office			Largent	
Critton Run	Stream	392756N	0782429W	Largent	581
Critton School (historical)	School	392728N	0782732W	Largent	1099
Crooked Run	Stream	392359N	0782617W	Largent	679
Crooked Run	Stream	392508N	0783407W	Levels	774
Crooked Run	Stream	391310N	0782833W	Capon Springs	837
Crooked Run Lake Dam	Dam	391230N	0782759W	Capon Springs	1020
Daisy Baker Spring	Spring	391514N	0782732W	Capon Bridge	892
Darbys Nose	Summit	392029N	0782530W	Capon Bridge	1234
Davey School (historical)	School	391538N	0784348W	Augusta	1470
Davis Ford	Populated Place	391147N	0783002W	Yellow Spring	856
Davy Post Office (historical)	Post Office			Burlington	
Deep Run	Stream	390947N	0783813W	Rio	1017
Deep Run School (historical)	School	390949N	0783814W	Rio	1030
Delray	Populated Place	391140N	0783615W	Yellow Spring	1001
Delray Post Office	Post Office	391140N	0783616W	Yellow Spring	1010
Denver School (historical)	School	391255N	0784053W	Rio	1401
Devil Hole Run	Stream	391314N	0785111W	Sector	741
Devils Backbone	Ridge	392051N	0783016W	Hanging Rock	856
The Devils Nose	Ridge	393032N	0782833W	Paw Paw	1037
Dewey School (historical)	School	392337N	0783816W	Springfield	1047
Diamond Ridge	Ridge	392259N	0782313W	Largent	1726
Dillons Mountain	Summit	391147N	0783142W	Yellow Spring	1913
Dillons Run	Stream	391752N	0782608W	Capon Bridge	810
Dillons Run (historical)	Populated Place	391410N	0783049W	Yellow Spring	1079
Dillons Run Post Office (historical)	Post Office			Yellow Spring	
Donaldson	Populated Place	392951N	0783916W	Springfield	650
Donaldson Post Office (historical)	Post Office			Springfield	
Donaldson School (historical)	School	392926N	0783939W	Springfield	663
Dry Gap	Gap	390634N	0782841W	Mountain Falls	2113
Dry Run	Stream	391821N	0784813W	Romney	659
Dry Run	Stream	390905N	0783111W	Yellow Spring	932
Dug Hill Run	Stream	392809N	0783124W	Levels	646
Dug Hill School (historical)	School	392740N	0783055W	Levels	784
Dumpling Run	Stream	392007N	0784835W	Romney	722
Dunmore Ridge	Ridge	391601N	0783529W	Hanging Rock	1401
Dutch Hollow	Valley	390355N	0783949W	Baker	1158
Dutch Lick School (historical)	School	392350N	0783547W	Levels	866
Eagle Rock	Summit	390654N	0782728W	Mountain Falls	2618
Ebenezer Church	Church	391948N	0784223W	Augusta	1453
Edwards Run	Stream	391957N	0782528W	Capon Bridge	768
Edwards Run Wildlife Management Area	Park	391921N	0782616W	Capon Bridge	820
Elijah High Cemetery	Cemetery	391718N	0785331W	Burlington	853
Elkhorn Lake Dam	Dam	391406N	0783659W	Yellow Spring	1421
Elkhorn Run	Stream	391257N	0783515W	Yellow Spring	932
Elmlick Run	Stream	391511N	0785454W	Burlington	915
Emboden School (historical)	School	392233N	0783513W	Levels	1220
Eubulus Church	Church	392823N	0782441W	Largent	823
Everett Fruit Farm Spring	Spring	391630N	0784414W	Augusta	2215
Extract Post Office (historical)	Post Office			Sector	
Fairview Church	Church	391839N	0784348W	Augusta	1572
Fairview Mountain	Summit	391701N	0785018W	Romney	2323
Falling Run	Stream	391055N	0783020W	Yellow Spring	863
Falling Spring Run	Stream	392724N	0782332W	Yellow Spring	587
Ferndale Farms Recreation Lake	Reservoir	392735N	0783617W	Levels	725
Ferndale Farms Recreation Lake Dam	Dam	392736N	0783617W	Levels	709
Flat Ridge	Ridge	390819N	0783733W	Rio	1883
Ford Hill	Summit	391446N	0784005W	Rio	1421
Fordhill Post Office (historical)	Post Office			Rio	
Forest Glen Church	Church	393101N	0783805W	Patterson Creek	597
Forks of Cacapon	Locale	392424N	0782551W	Largent	718
Forks of Cacapon Post Office (historical)	Post Office			Largent	
Forks of Capon School (historical)	School			Largent	
Fort Capon (historical)	Military (Historical)			Largent	
Fort Cox (historical)	Military (Historical)			Paw Paw	
Fort Edwards (historical)	Military (Historical)			Capon Bridge	
Fort Furman (historical)	Military (Historical)			Springfield	
Fort Mackeys (historical)	Military (Historical)			Capon Bridge	
Fort Mill Ridge Wildlife Management Area	Park	391930N	0784727W	Romney	951
Fort Parker (historical)	Military (Historical)			Springfield	
Fort Pearsall (historical)	Military (Historical)	392035N	0784600W	Romney	823
Fox Farm Spring	Spring	392301N	0784548W	Headsville	948
Fox Run	Stream	392405N	0784449W	Springfield	623
Frenchburg	Populated Place	391855N	0783938W	Augusta	1010
Frog Hollow	Valley	392005N	0782630W	Capon Bridge	853
Furnace School (historical)	School	392435N	0782356W	Largent	781
Gap Run Spring	Spring	390800N	0783847W	Rio	1467
George Washington National Forest	Forest	383001N	0790959W	Brandywine	2894
Georges Peak	Summit	392121N	0782721W	Capon Bridge	1726
Gibbons Run	Stream	392012N	0783122W	Hanging Rock	801
Ginnevan Cemetery	Cemetery	393007N	0782916W	Paw Paw	646
Glebe (historical)	Populated Place	391200N	0785133W	Sector	876
Glebe Post Office (historical)	Post Office			Sector	
Glenwood School (historical)	School	391625N	0782550W	Capon Bridge	945
Good	Populated Place	392127N	0782140W	Gore	1158
Good Post Office (historical)	Post Office			Gore	
Gore Magisterial District	Civil	392314N	0783403W	Levels	1083
Grace	Populated Place	392550N	0784248W	Springfield	630
Grassy Lick Run	Stream	390855N	0784307W	Rio	1322
Grassy Lick School	School	391105N	0784343W	Rio	1526
Graybill Hollow	Valley	392506N	0783452W	Levels	791
Green Spring	Populated Place	393154N	0783659W	Oldtown	551
Green Spring	Spring	393141N	0783618W	Oldtown	623
Green Spring Elementary School (historical)	School	393140N	0783711W	Oldtown	548
Green Spring Post Office	Post Office			Oldtown	
Green Spring Ridge	Ridge	393119N	0783812W	Patterson Creek	866
Green Spring Run	Stream	393158N	0783619W	Oldtown	522
Greenwood Hollow	Valley	392856N	0783959W	Springfield	712
Gunbarrel Hollow	Valley	391417N	0783007W	Yellow Spring	984
Haines Store (historical)	Locale	392130N	0783401W	Hanging Rock	1243
Hainesville Post Office (historical)	Post Office			Levels	
Hampshire Club (historical)	Locale	391715N	0784840W	Romney	702
Hampshire County Career Training Center	School	391933N	0784158W	Augusta	1434
Hampshire County Courthouse	Building	392032N	0784522W	Romney	873
Hampshire County Spring	Spring	391527N	0785701W	Burlington	1099
Hampshire Memorial Hospital	Hospital	392103N	0784528W	Romney	768
Hampshire Senior High School	School	391933N	0784156W	Augusta	1430
Hanging Rock	Locale	391557N	0783227W	Hanging Rock	948
Hanging Rock Post Office (historical)	Post Office			Hanging Rock	
Hannums Mills Post Office (historical)	Post Office			Capon Springs	
Harding Spring	Spring	391708N	0783356W	Hanging Rock	1145
Harness Run	Stream	390750N	0783252W	Yellow Spring	906
Hawk Campground	Locale	390659N	0782956W	Mountain Falls	1381
Hawk Run	Stream	390823N	0783217W	Yellow Spring	902
Heare Cemetery	Cemetery	391048N	0784309W	Rio	1496
Hebron Church	Church	390903N	0783230W	Yellow Spring	909
Henderson Hollow	Valley	391602N	0783257W	Hanging Rock	896
Hiett Run	Stream	392014N	0783028W	Hanging Rock	794
Hiett Spring	Spring	391838N	0782658W	Capon Bridge	912
Higginsville	Populated Place	392505N	0783447W	Levels	774
Higginsville Post Office (historical)	Post Office			Levels	
High Knob	Summit	391157N	0785357W	Old Fields	2648
High Point	Summit	392636N	0782048W	Ridge	2618
High Spring	Spring	391341N	0785502W	Old Fields	1040
High View	Populated Place	391350N	0782430W	Capon Springs	1263
High View Post Office	Post Office			Capon Springs	
Highview School (historical)	School	391732N	0784344W	Augusta	1621
Himmelwright Run	Stream	390808N	0782854W	Capon Springs	1175
Hoffman Hollow	Valley	392807N	0783138W	Levels	699
Holiness Church	Church	391840N	0784059W	Augusta	1073
Hooks Mills	Populated Place	391431N	0782749W	Capon Springs	889
Hooks Mills Post Office (historical)	Post Office			Capon Springs	
Hopewell School (historical)	School	391852N	0783514W	Hanging Rock	1240
Hopkins Lick Run	Stream	392703N	0783223W	Levels	705
Hopkins Lick School (historical)	School	392704N	0783224W	Levels	725
Horn Camp Run	Stream	390918N	0784514W	Sector	1407
Horn Camp School (historical)	School	391042N	0784619W	Sector	1654
Horsebone Hollow	Valley	392551N	0782314W	Largent	1020
Horselick Run	Stream	391808N	0785226W	Romney	807
Hotts Chapel	Church	391232N	0784406W	Rio	1657
Hotts Chapel Cemetery	Cemetery	391235N	0784402W	Rio	1699
Hoy	Populated Place	391904N	0783307W	Hanging Rock	1260
Hoy Post Office (historical)	Post Office			Hanging Rock	
Hoy School (historical)	School	391928N	0783250W	Hanging Rock	1217
Huffman Spring	Spring	392919N	0783927W	Springfield	656
Ice Mountain	Summit	392148N	0782801W	Capon Bridge	1489
Ice Mountain Spring	Spring	392029N	0782941W	Capon Bridge	840
Independence School (historical)	School	391743N	0783203W	Hanging Rock	978
Indian Mound Cemetery	Cemetery	392033N	0784557W	Romney	820
Intermont	Populated Place	390846N	0783249W	Yellow Spring	906
Intermont Post Office (historical)	Post Office			Yellow Spring	
Island Hill Church	Church	392418N	0782621W	Largent	856
Island Ridge	Ridge	391458N	0785046W	Sector	1138
Ivy Run	Stream	392436N	0782404W	Largent	758
Jericho (historical)	Populated Place	391242N	0782529W	Capon Springs	1398
Jericho Post Office (historical)	Post Office			Capon Springs	
Jersey School (historical)	School	392237N	0783850W	Springfield	1240
Johns Run	Stream	392539N	0784255W	Springfield	614
Johnson Hollow	Valley	393000N	0782849W	Largent	791
Junction	Populated Place	391847N	0785146W	Romney	820
Junction Post Office	Populated Place			Romney	
Kale Hollow	Valley	391522N	0782733W	Capon Bridge	820
Kedron School (historical)	School	392113N	0783251W	Hanging Rock	1161
Kern Hollow	Valley	393201N	0783909W	Patterson Creek	561
Kerns School (historical)	School	392553N	0784435W	Springfield	951
Kincade School (historical)	School	392840N	0784239W	Springfield	1102
Kirby	Populated Place	391058N	0784334W	Rio	1512
Kirby Post Office	Post Office	391057N	0784333W	Rio	1509
Kuykendalls Fort (historical)	Military (Historical)			Romney	
L Ridge	Ridge	391122N	0782836W	Capon Springs	1247
L Ridge School (historical)	School	391142N	0782752W	Capon Springs	1125
Lafollettsville Post Office (historical)	Post Office			Capon Springs	
Lapley Hollow	Valley	393043N	0782936W	Paw Paw	525
Largent	Populated Place	392840N	0782256W	Largent	591
Lehew	Populated Place	391157N	0782617W	Capon Springs	1414
Lehew Post Office (historical)	Post Office			Capon Springs	
Leith Mountain	Summit	392117N	0782415W	Capon Bridge	1591
Levels	Populated Place	392904N	0783313W	Levels	1207
Levels Elementary School (historical)	School	392853N	0783329W	Levels	1194
Levels Post Office	Post Office			Levels	
Lick Run	Stream	391113N	0783644W	Yellow Spring	958
Little Cacapon	Populated Place	393056N	0782939W	Paw Paw	535
Little Cacapon Church	Church	391930N	0783909W	Augusta	971
Little Cacapon Mountain	Summit	392100N	0783637W	Hanging Rock	1575
Little Cacapon River	Stream	393106N	0782938W	Paw Paw	499
Little Devil Hole Run	Stream	391208N	0784953W	Sector	1063
Loman Branch	Stream	391214N	0782947W	Capon Springs	840
Long Meadow Run	Stream	392028N	0784834W	Romney	768
Long Run	Stream	392321N	0784534W	Headsville	745
Loom	Populated Place	391643N	0783041W	Hanging Rock	1473
Loom Post Office (historical)	Post Office			Hanging Rock	
Maple Run	Stream	392047N	0783055W	Hanging Rock	774
Mayhew Run	Stream	392116N	0784802W	Romney	846
McDowell Run	Stream	391902N	0784736W	Romney	640
Meadow Run	Stream	390853N	0784155W	Rio	1243
Mechanicsburg	Populated Place	392007N	0784837W	Romney	732
Mechanicsburg School (historical)	School	392056N	0784811W	Romney	823
Mill Branch	Stream	391724N	0782612W	Capon Bridge	794
Mill Creek	Stream	392008N	0784704W	Romney	702
Mill Creek Magisterial District	Civil	391643N	0785324W	Burlington	899
Mill Creek Mountain	Ridge	391735N	0784958W	Romney	2119
Mill Creek School	School	391427N	0785519W	Old Fields	948
Mill Run	Stream	391808N	0784805W	Romney	659
Millbrook	Populated Place	391259N	0783250W	Yellow Spring	1276
Millbrook Post Office (historical)	Post Office			Yellow Spring	
Millbrook School (historical)	School			Yellow Spring	
Millen	Populated Place	393106N	0783748W	Patterson Creek	584
Miller Hollow	Valley	393122N	0783141W	Oldtown	548
Milleson	Populated Place	392744N	0784111W	Springfield	778
Millesons Mill	Populated Place	392625N	0784027W	Springfield	607
Moores Run	Stream	390612N	0783433W	Wardensville	932
Mount Olive Church	Church	391535N	0782941W	Capon Bridge	1188
Mountain Spring	Spring	390745N	0782824W	Capon Springs	1398
Mudlick Run	Stream	390835N	0785541W	Old Fields	755
Nathaniel Mountain	Summit	391233N	0784741W	Sector	2739
Nathaniel Mountain Lookout Tower	Tower	391157N	0784727W	Sector	2989
Nathaniel Mountain Wildlife Management Area	Park	391321N	0784728W	Sector	1929
Neals Run	Populated Place	392900N	0782947W	Largent	801
Neals Run Post Office (historical)	Post Office			Largent	
Nero (historical)	Populated Place	391032N	0782619W	Capon Springs	1194
Nero Post Office (historical)	Post Office			Capon Springs	
North Branch Potomac River	Stream	393142N	0783515W	Oldtown	518
North Fork Little Cacapon River	Stream	391855N	0783927W	Augusta	1001
North River	Stream	392433N	0782515W	Largent	666
North River Mills	Populated Place	392011N	0783011W	Hanging Rock	814
North River Mills Post Office (historical)	Post Office			Hanging Rock	
North River Mills School (historical)	School			Hanging Rock	
North River Mills United Methodist Church	Church	392010N	0783007W	Hanging Rock	820
North River Mountain	Summit	391059N	0783531W	Yellow Spring	2149
North Texas School (historical)	School	391307N	0783637W	Yellow Spring	1161
Okonoko	Populated Place	393123N	0783131W	Oldtown	584
Okonoko Church	Church	393004N	0783346W	Oldtown	1070
Okonoko Post Office (historical)	Post Office			Oldtown	
Old Man Run	Stream	391504N	0782718W	Capon Bridge	801
Old Pine Church	Church	391255N	0785533W	Old Fields	1155
Old Romney Grade	Trail	392424N	0782027W	Ridge	1197
Pancake	Populated Place	391529N	0785002W	Romney	758
Pancake Post Office (historical)	Post Office			Romney	
Pancake School (historical)	School	391807N	0784759W	Romney	682
Parks Valley	Valley	391734N	0782807W	Capon Bridge	1007
Pin Oak	Populated Place			Largent	
Pine Draft Run	Stream	391734N	0783255W	Hanging Rock	856
Pine Mountain	Summit	392121N	0782721W	Capon Bridge	1726
Pleasant Dale	Populated Place	391739N	0783510W	Hanging Rock	1060
Pleasant Grove Church	Church	391842N	0782241W	Capon Bridge	1106
Points	Populated Place	392624N	0783637W	Levels	1099
Points Post Office	Post Office	392619N	0783636W	Levels	1063
Pot Lick Run	Stream	390856N	0784438W	Rio	1375
Purgitsville	Populated Place	391421N	0785516W	Old Fields	951
Purgitsville Post Office	Post Office	391422N	0785515W	Old Fields	965
Purgitsville School (historical)	School			Old Fields	
Queen of Gore School (historical)	School	392243N	0783308W	Levels	1260
Queens Ridge	Ridge	392503N	0783310W	Levels	1322
Racey Cemetery	Cemetery	391029N	0782643W	Capon Springs	1375
Rada	Populated Place	391626N	0785448W	Burlington	896
Rada Post Office (historical)	Post Office			Burlington	
Rada School (historical)	School			Burlington	
Raven Rocks	Summit	392015N	0782948W	Capon Bridge	1234
Raven Rocks	Populated Place	392640N	0784047W	Springfield	656
Raven Rock Spring	Spring	392629N	0784041W	Springfield	614
Ridgedale	Populated Place	392441N	0784405W	Springfield	653
Ridgedale School (historical)	School	391646N	0784200W	Augusta	1440
Riggs Hollow	Valley	392002N	0782955W	Capon Bridge	846
Rio	Populated Place	390818N	0784012W	Rio	1132
Rio Elementary School (historical)	School	390820N	0784011W	Rio	1125
Rio Post Office	Post Office	390827N	0784023W	Rio	1152
Romney	Populated Place	392031N	0784524W	Romney	876
Romney Christian Church	Church	392039N	0784534W	Romney	820
Romney Church of the Nazarene	Church	392048N	0784531W	Romney	797
Romney Classical Institute (historical)	School	392021N	0784502W	Romney	869
Romney Elementary School	School	392037N	0784552W	Romney	837
Romney Junction (historical)	Locale	392125N	0784530W	Romney	689
Romney Junior High School	School	392040N	0784550W	Romney	814
Romney Magisterial District	Civil	391801N	0784749W	Romney	768
Romney Post Office	Post Office			Romney	
Romney Spring	Spring	391943N	0784811W	Romney	1030
Ruckman	Populated Place	391358N	0784134W	Rio	1460
Ruckman Post Office (historical)	Post Office			Rio	
Russell Ridge	Ridge	393045N	0783244W	Oldtown	1060
Saint James Cemetery	Cemetery	391245N	0783221W	Yellow Spring	1293
Saint Lukes Church	Church	391309N	0785110W	Sector	764
Salem Church	Church	392324N	0783306W	Levels	1152
Sandy Hollow	Valley	391936N	0782448W	Capon Bridge	797
Sandy Hollow School (historical)	School	391718N	0785334W	Burlington	869
Sandy Ridge	Ridge	391921N	0782822W	Capon Bridge	1683
Sandy Ridge Church	Church	392023N	0782738W	Capon Bridge	1358
Sandy Ridge School (historical)	School	392027N	0782732W	Capon Bridge	1352
Sawmill Run	Stream	391327N	0785117W	Sector	689
Schaffenaker Mountain	Summit	391637N	0782821W	Capon Bridge	1493
Sector	Populated Place	391341N	0785121W	Sector	741
Sector Post Office (historical)	Post Office			Sector	
Sedan	Populated Place	391406N	0783424W	Yellow Spring	951
Sedan Post Office (historical)	Post Office			Yellow Spring	
Sedan School (historical)	School			Yellow Spring	
Shady Grove School (historical)	School	391939N	0784356W	Augusta	1037
Shanks	Populated Place	391851N	0784116W	Augusta	1115
Shanks Post Office	Post Office	391848N	0784110W	Augusta	1096
Shanks Roadside Park	Park	391859N	0784129W	Augusta	1207
Shanty Hollow	Valley	393052N	0782803W	Paw Paw	698
Shawan Run	Stream	392103N	0783818W	Augusta	906
Sherman Magisterial District	Civil	391347N	0784018W	Rio	1306
Shiloh (historical)	Populated Place	391057N	0782554W	Capon Springs	1224
Shiloh Church	Church	391147N	0782624W	Capon Springs	1362
Shiloh School (historical)	School	392512N	0783727W	Levels	1135
Short Hollow	Valley	392821N	0784107W	Springfield	820
Short Mountain	Summit	390549N	0784433W	Baker	2864
Short Mountain Wildlife Management Area	Park	391133N	0784011W	Rio	2067
Shuller Mill (historical)	Locale			Yellow Spring	
Sideling Hill	Ridge	393152N	0782349W	Paw Paw	2021
Slanes Knob	Summit	391940N	0782713W	Capon Bridge	1588
Slanesville	Populated Place	392223N	0783122W	Hanging Rock	1178
Slanesville Elementary School	School	392214N	0783151W	Hanging Rock	1201
Slanesville Post Office	Post Office	392223N	0783124W	Hanging Rock	1191
Slanesville Presbyterian Church	Church	392229N	0783125W	Hanging Rock	1214
Slate Lick Knob	Summit	392521N	0784724W	Headsville	1713
Smith Hollow	Valley	393032N	0782931W	Paw Paw	535
South Branch	Locale	393120N	0783427W	Oldtown	558
South Branch Mountain	Ridge	391139N	0784745W	Sector	3028
South Branch Post Office (historical)	Post Office			Oldtown	
South Branch Potomac River	Stream	393142N	0783515W	Oldtown	518
South Branch School (historical)	School	391933N	0784750W	Romney	741
South Fork Little Cacapon River	Stream	391855N	0783927W	Augusta	1001
Sperry Run	Stream	390810N	0783916W	Rio	1089
Spring Gap	Gap	392627N	0782942W	Largent	1614
Spring Gap (historical)	Populated Place	392527N	0783149W	Levels	1073
Spring Gap Church	Church	392612N	0783035W	Levels	1286
Spring Gap Mountain	Summit	392727N	0782853W	Largent	2215
Spring Gap Post Office (historical)	Post Office			Levels	
Spring Mountain	Summit	390659N	0782824W	Mountain Falls	2418
Springfield	Populated Place	392702N	0784137W	Springfield	735
Springfield Academy (historical)	School			Springfield	
Springfield Greenspring Elementary School	School	392700N	0784148W	Springfield	771
Springfield Magisterial District	Civil	392737N	0783946W	Springfield	1155
Springfield Post Office	Post Office	392647N	0784151W	Springfield	774
Springfield Spring	Spring	392626N	0784039W	Springfield	610
Springfield Valley	Valley	392702N	0784111W	Springfield	699
Springfield Wildlife Management Area	Park	392755N	0783919W	Springfield	1539
Staacks Gap	Gap	390755N	0783857W	Rio	1444
Stonewall School (historical)	School	391903N	0783751W	Augusta	1296
Stony Mountain	Summit	391501N	0784317W	Augusta	2274
Stony Post Office (historical)	Post Office			Augusta	
Stony Run	Stream	391507N	0785019W	Romney	679
Stony Run	Stream	393014N	0783416W	Oldtown	525
Stuart Hollow	Valley	391559N	0783230W	Hanging Rock	938
Stump Run	Stream	391936N	0784711W	Romney	640
Sugar Grove School (historical)	School	391425N	0784247W	Rio	1447
Sugar Run	Stream	392001N	0784840W	Romney	741
Sulphur Spring Run	Stream	392050N	0784548W	Romney	696
Swisher Hollow	Valley	392648N	0784041W	Springfield	653
Taylor Knob	Summit	391425N	0785256W	Old Fields	1726
Taylor School (historical)	School	392745N	0783741W	Springfield	768
Tear Coat Church	Church	391751N	0783606W	Hanging Rock	1070
Tearcoat Creek	Stream	391756N	0783308W	Hanging Rock	843
The Lock	Locale	392738N	0782047W	Ridge	2329
Thrasher Knob	Summit	391305N	0785354W	Old Fields	2142
Three Churches	Populated Place	392403N	0783915W	Springfield	1306
Three Churches Post Office	Post Office	392408N	0783914W	Springfield	1299
Three Churches Run	Stream	392333N	0783601W	Springfield	814
Timber Mountain	Summit	391822N	0783012W	Hanging Rock	1765
Timber Mountain School (historical)	School	391744N	0783025W	Hanging Rock	1601
Timber Ridge	Ridge	392155N	0781948W	Gore	1355
Titus Run	Stream	391938N	0784908W	Romney	738
Town Hill	Ridge	392616N	0783450W	Levels	1329
Trinity Church	Church	391822N	0785135W	Romney	869
Trinton Hollow	Valley	392151N	0783718W	Hanging Rock	879
The Trough	Valley	391325N	0785127W	Sector	728
Turkeyfoot Run	Stream	391709N	0783537W	Hanging Rock	1033
Union Church	Church	391228N	0783545W	Yellow Spring	958
Union Church (historical)	Church	391752N	0783659W	Hanging Rock	1184
Union School (historical)	School	391855N	0785207W	Romney	850
Valley Mountain	Summit	392850N	0783859W	Romney	1437
Valley Post Office (historical)	Post Office			Romney	
Vance	Populated Place	392241N	0784419W	Springfield	650
Vanderlip Post Office (historical)	Post Office			Romney	
Victory School (historical)	School	392753N	0782449W	Largent	650
Victory School (historical)	School	392510N	0783155W	Levels	1112
Victory School (historical)	School	391537N	0783745W	Augusta	1204
Vinita [Venita] School (historical)	School	392458N	0783355W	Levels	801
Wacousta Hill	Summit	391300N	0783614W	Yellow Spring	1276
Walnut Grove School (historical)	School	392016N	0782457W	Capon Bridge	889
Walnut Grove School (historical)	School	391800N	0784004W	Augusta	1089
Wappocomo	Populated Place	392342N	0784405W	Springfield	646
Wappocomo Post Office (historical)	Post Office			Springfield	
Warden Lake Wildlife Management Area	Park	390801N	0783553W	Yellow Spring	1286
Watson School (historical)	School	391422N	0784116W	Rio	1555
Wergman Run	Stream	392016N	0784634W	Romney	640
West Romney Station (historical)	Locale	392014N	0784704W	Romney	699
West Virginia Schools for the Deaf and Blind	School	392021N	0784502W	Romney	869
Wickham	Populated Place	391244N	0785206W	Sector	768
Willow Tree School (historical)	School	392052N	0784116W	Augusta	1365
Wolf Hollow	Valley	392710N	0782536W	Largent	604
Wood School (historical)	School	391238N	0785116W	Sector	787
Woodlawn School (historical)	School	392018N	0783553W	Hanging Rock	1332
Woodrow	Populated Place	392957N	0782611W	Largent	1014
Woodrow Cemetery	Cemetery	392959N	0782618W	Largent	1083
Woodrow School	School	392938N	0782611W	Largent	1086
Woodrow Union Church	Church	392957N	0782611W	Largent	1014
Yellow Spring	Populated Place	391056N	0783034W	Yellow Spring	896
Yellow Spring	Spring	391120N	0783117W	Yellow Spring	1299
Yellow Spring Gap	Gap	391115N	0783104W	Yellow Spring	1201
Yellow Spring Post Office	Post Office	391057N	0783028W	Yellow Spring	889
Youngsly Mill (historical)	Locale			Capon Bridge	
Zoar Church	Church	391458N	0784018W	Rio	1457
