= Spring Gap =

Spring Gap may refer to:

- Spring Gap, Maryland, an unincorporated community in Allegany County
- Spring Gap Mountain in the Eastern Panhandle of West Virginia
- Spring Gap (Wyoming), a mountain pass in Wyoming
