= Largent, West Virginia =

- unincorporated community
- Location within West Virginia Location within the United States
- Coordinates: 39°28′40″N 78°22′56″W
- Country: United States
- State: West Virginia
- County: Morgan
- Time zone: UTC-5 (Eastern (EST))
  - Summer (DST): UTC-4 (EDT)
- GNIS feature ID: 1541353

Largent is an unincorporated community located chiefly in Morgan County and partly in Hampshire County in the U.S. state of West Virginia. Largent is located on the Cacapon River, approximately 18 miles southwest of Berkeley Springs along Cacapon Road (West Virginia Route 9). It is located by Old Enon Cemetery, Stony Creek, and the Cacapon River. Largent's original town name was Enon. It was most likely renamed when Postal Service found another town of Enon elsewhere in the state. The Enon name is found in local church and cemetery names. The Enon school is found on USGS maps from 1914 through 1923 (Capon Bridge maps). The school has been open at least since the 1930s. The Baileys bought the building in 1958 and it has been a residence since.

The Largent Bridge was originally constructed between 1916 and 1918 as a one lane bridge by Daniel Luten's Luten Bridge Company. It was widened to two lanes in 1935 by the J.M. Francesa & Co. of Fayetteville, WV with funding provided by the New Deal. The widening of the bridge is evident when viewing the bridge from underneath. The bridge was added to the National Register of Historic Places on September 8, 2025 for its significance in the areas of engineering and transportation..

== Businesses ==
The only (currently operating) local business is Stoney Creek Country Store.

== Communication ==
Largent's post office was in operation from 1906 until the 1950s. Residences and businesses in Largent are currently serviced by Great Cacapon's post office, therefore bearing Great Cacapon addresses. However, Largent's telephone exchange is 947 which is a Paw Paw exchange.

== Transportation ==
Other roads include Kilgore Lane, Alpine Drive, Stoney Creek Road, Dunrovin Lane, Golliday Lane and Oliver Lane. A bridge over the Cacapon River is part of Cacapon Road and leads to the town of Woodrow.
