= Howard Llewellyn Swisher =

American businessperson, real estate developer, orchardist, editor, writer, and historian

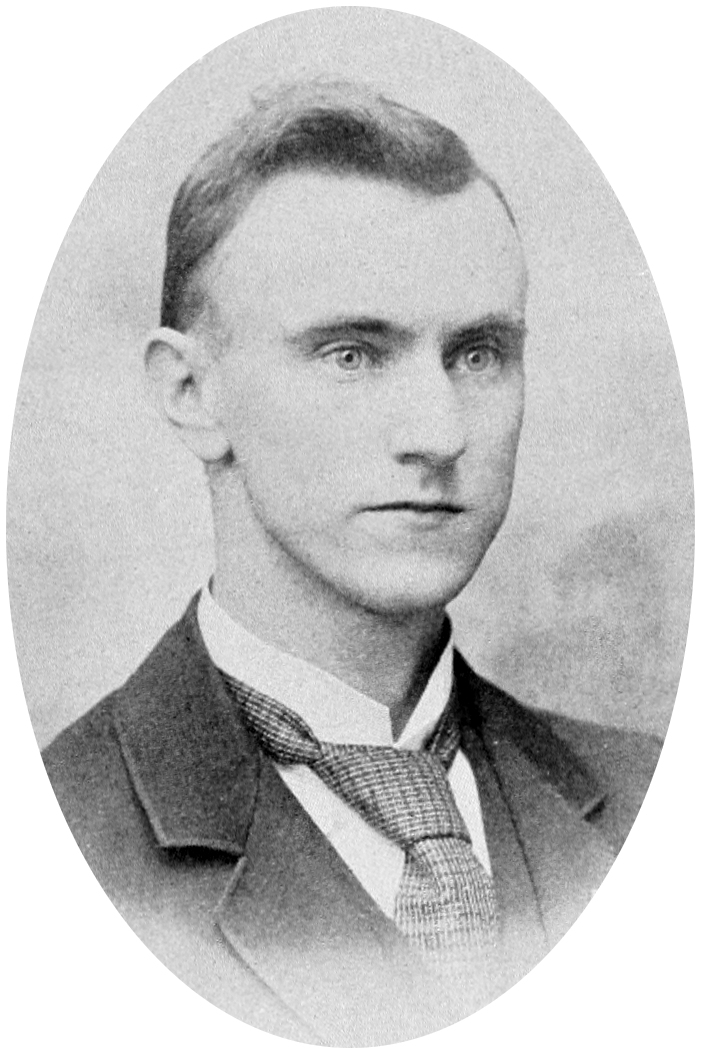
- Portrait Swisher, prior to 1897.
- Born: September 21, 1870 near Levels, West Virginia, US
- Died: August 27, 1945 (aged 74); Morgantown, West Virginia, US
- Resting place: Oak Grove Cemetery, Morgantown
- Education: Fairmont State Normal School; West Virginia University
- Occupations: Businessperson, real estate developer, orchardist, editor, writer, and historian
- Known for: Co-authoring History of Hampshire County, West Virginia From Its Earliest Settlement to the Present (1897) with Hu Maxwell
- Spouse: Mary Dering Swisher

Signature
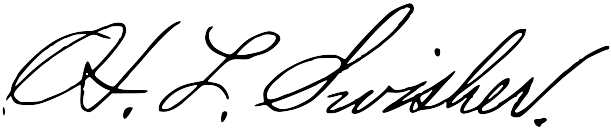

Howard Llewellyn Swisher (September 21, 1870 – August 27, 1945) was an American businessperson, real estate developer, orchardist, editor, writer, and historian. As a prominent businessman, he established several companies responsible for the development of businesses and real estate in Morgantown, West Virginia.

Swisher was born in 1870 near Levels, West Virginia. He became a schoolteacher there at the age of 18, then graduated from Fairmont State Normal School (present-day Fairmont State University) and West Virginia University. He then remained in Morgantown, where he established a bookstore and stationery shop. Following the success of his bookstore, Swisher organized the Main Street Building Company, the Howard L. Swisher Company, and the Morgantown Building Association, each of which constructed a large number of residences in the city. He was also the inaugural secretary-treasurer of the West Virginia Real Estate Dealers' Association.

Swisher was secretary of the Royalty Oil Company, which owned mining rights for approximately 16,000 acres (65 km^{2}) of prospective oil lands throughout the United States. He also held prominent leadership and management roles in the Valley Wood Working Company, the Monongahela Valley Posting and Distributing Plant, the Federal Savings and Trust Company, and the West Virginia Tri-Products Company. In Hampshire County, Swisher maintained fruit growing interests and served as the president of the South Branch Merchandising Company. He was an active member of the West Virginia Democratic Party and was selected as a delegate from West Virginia to the 1936 Democratic National Convention.

In 1897, Swisher co-authored History of Hampshire County, West Virginia: From Its Earliest Settlement to the Present with West Virginia historian Hu Maxwell. The book was the first comprehensive history of Hampshire County ever compiled. He composed a collection of poetry and short stories, Briar Blossoms, in 1899, and was the editor of The Ghourki, a literary journal of poetry, short stories, and aphorisms. In 1908, Swisher published Book of Harangues, a selection of passages from The Ghourki.

== Family background ==
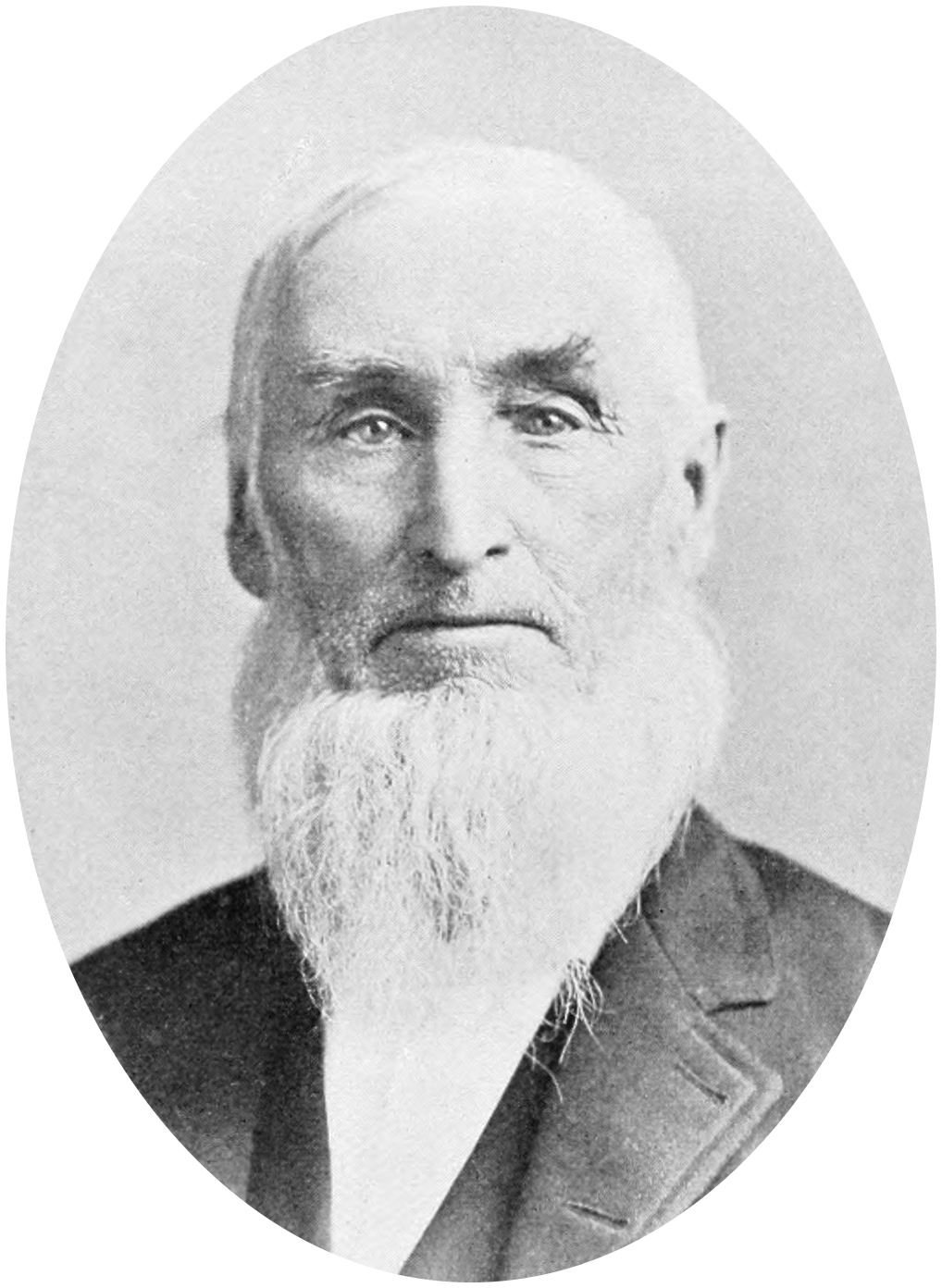
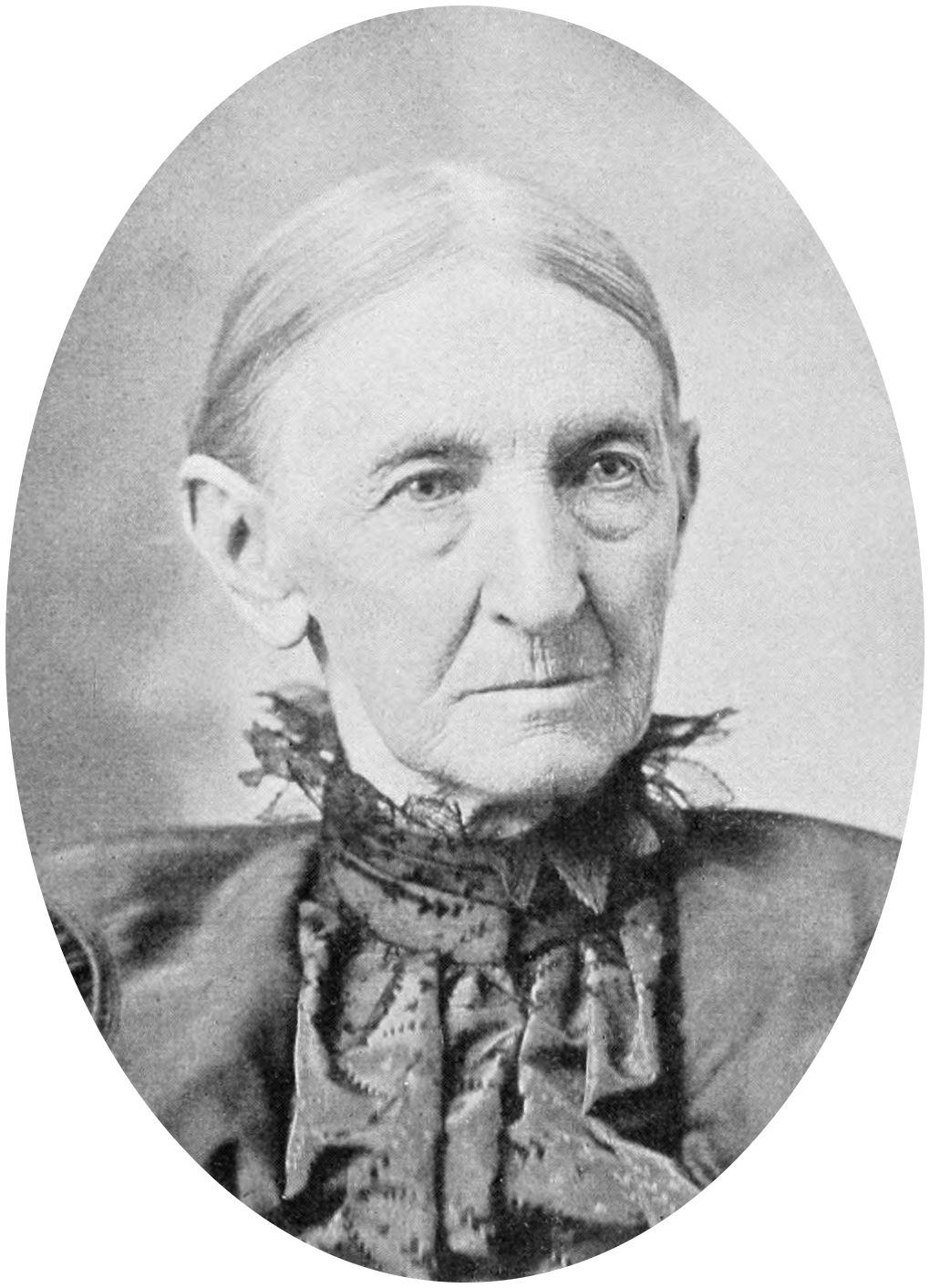
Swisher's parents: David Warner Swisher (left) and Mary Katherine Bonnifield Swisher (right).

Howard Llewellyn Swisher was born on September 21, 1870, on a farm near the unincorporated community of Levels, West Virginia. He was the son of David Warner Swisher and his wife, Mary Katherine Bonnifield Swisher. David was born in Augusta County, Virginia on April 29, 1822, and was of Swiss German and French ancestry. David moved to Preston County in present-day West Virginia in 1838, and a few years later, he purchased land near present-day Levels in Hampshire County and relocated there. He then established a farm on this land, known as "The Levels," and remained there for the remainder of his life. The Swisher family owned and operated one of the largest orchard operations in the Levels community. In 1846, David married his wife, Mary Katherine Bonnifield, the daughter of Dr. Arnold Bonnifield of St. George, West Virginia.

== Early life and education ==
Swisher spent his early years and adolescence on his father's farm, until he became a schoolteacher in Hampshire County at the age of 18. He began his post-secondary education at Fairmont State Normal School (present-day Fairmont State University) in Fairmont, which he graduated from in 1892. While enrolled there, Swisher became affiliated with the Mu Mu chapter of the Sigma Chi fraternity. Following his graduation, he traveled throughout the northwestern United States and the Canadian provinces and territories of Alberta, Assiniboia, British Columbia, and Manitoba. Swisher then moved to Fresno, California, where he worked as a public schoolteacher for two years. He then returned to West Virginia and attended West Virginia University in Morgantown. While at the university, he aspired to become a journalist and edited The Athenaeum, the institution's official student newspaper. In 1897, after three years of studies, Swisher graduated from the university with a Bachelor of Arts degree.

== Business career ==
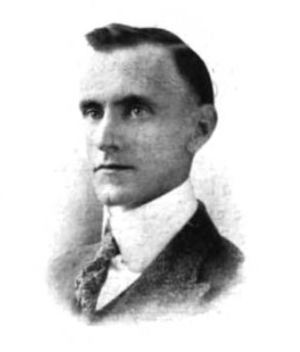
Swisher in 1903

As a prominent businessman, Swisher established several corporations and companies responsible for the development of businesses and commercial and residential real estate in Morgantown. He remained in Morgantown after his graduation from West Virginia University, and in 1897 with $700 in capital, he opened a book and stationery store known as the Acme Book Store. The business prospered, and in April 1898, Swisher established the Acme Publishing Company, which he served as president of for several years.

Swisher subsequently organized the Main Street Building Company, which became responsible for building the Strand Building, a business and commercial block in Morgantown. He established and incorporated the Howard L. Swisher Company in November 1914. He also organized the Morgantown Building Association in November 1918 with an authorized capital of $250,000 and himself serving as its general manager. The Morgantown Building Association undertook extensive construction of residences in the city. In December 1914, following its organization in Parkersburg, Swisher was named the secretary-treasurer of the West Virginia Real Estate Dealers' Association. The association was formed in cooperation with the West Virginia Department of Agriculture and other state agencies for the promotion and development of the states's agricultural resources, real estate, and investments.

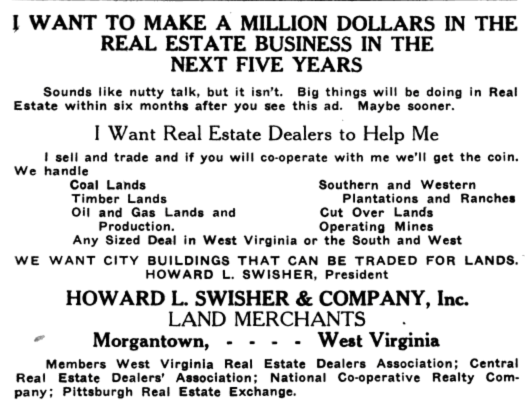
Advertisement for Howard L. Swisher and Company, Inc. Land Merchants, 1918

In addition to his real estate and construction ventures, Swisher was an organizer and secretary of the Royalty Oil Company, which owned mining rights to approximately 16,000 acres (65 km^{2}) of prospective oil lands throughout the southern and southwestern United States. He built and operated the Swisher Theater in Morgantown. Swisher was also a director of the Valley Wood Working Company, the owner of the Monongahela Valley Posting and Distributing Plant, and the secretary of the Federal Savings and Trust Company prior to 1903. By 1913, he was the president of the West Virginia Tri-Products Company, which invested in coal and oil production, glass manufacturing, and the production of timber and fruit. Swisher maintained fruit growing interests on South Branch Mountain (known as Jersey Mountain) in Hampshire County, and served as the president of the South Branch Merchandising Company.

== Writing career ==
During his travels, Swisher contributed articles and poetry to newspapers throughout the Northwest. While attending West Virginia University, he published a small book containing approximately 600 lines of poetry, which he dedicated to his classmates. In 1897, Swisher co-authored History of Hampshire County, West Virginia: From Its Earliest Settlement to the Present with West Virginia historian Hu Maxwell. The book was the first comprehensive history of Hampshire County ever compiled. He composed a collection of poetry and short stories titled Briar Blossoms, which was published by his Acme Publishing Company in 1899. Swisher was the editor of The Ghourki, a literary journal of poetry, short stories, and aphorisms. He began each issue with an introductory commentary entitled "Harangues to the Ghourki" in which he referred to himself as the "Chief of the Tribe". In 1908, Swisher published Book of Harangues, a selection of passages from The Ghourki.

== Politics ==
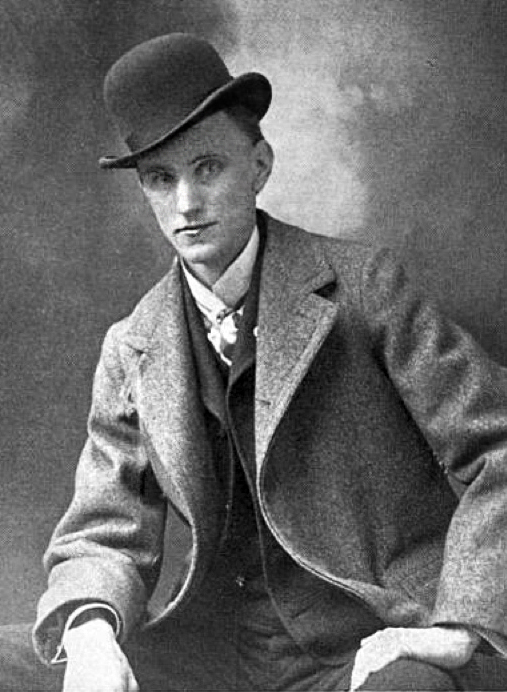
Portrait of Howard Llewellyn Swisher from Briar Blossoms (1899)

Swisher was an active member of the West Virginia Democratic Party. In 1900, he was selected as a candidate for State Superintendent of Free Schools. In the 1902 general election, he ran as the Democratic candidate for the Eleventh District of the West Virginia State Senate. Despite his loss, Swisher received the largest number of Democratic votes ever amassed in Monongalia County up until that time. Swisher was a delegate at the 1936 Democratic National Convention in Philadelphia, and was selected as an alternate delegate to the Democratic National Conventions of 1912 and 1924.

== Personal life ==
In August 1897, Swisher married Mary Dering of Morgantown, daughter of Edward A. Dering and his wife, Cordelia Walker Dering of Morgantown. Both the Dering and Walker families, from which Swisher's wife descended, had arrived in the Colony of Virginia during its earlier periods of settlement.

Swisher was a member of the Morgantown Union Lodge No. 4 of the Free and Accepted Masons, Morgantown Lodge No. 411 of the Benevolent and Protective Order of Elks, the Morgantown Chamber of Commerce, the Kiwanis Club, the Country Club, and the Old Colony Club. Swisher served on the Old Colony Club's National Advisory Council.

On August 27, 1945, Swisher died of a cerebral hemorrhage due to hypertension at his residence at 80 Donley Street in Morgantown. Swisher was interred on August 30, 1945, at Oak Grove Cemetery in Morgantown's Chancery Hill Historic District.

== Selected works ==
- History of Hampshire County, West Virginia: From Its Earliest Settlement to the Present. 1897. Co-authored with Hu Maxwell.
- Briar Blossoms: Being a Collection of a Few Verses and Some Prose. 1899.
- Book of Harangues. 1908.

== Bibliography ==
- American Historical Society; Special Staff of Writers (1923). History of West Virginia Old and New and West Virginia Biography, Volume 3. Chicago, Illinois and New York City, New York: The American Historical Society, Inc. OCLC 373051.
- Biographical Publishing Company (1903). Men of West Virginia, Volume 1. Chicago, Illinois: Biographical Publishing Company. OCLC 3463313. Archived from the original on November 15, 2013.
- Brannon, Selden W., ed. (1976). Historic Hampshire: A Symposium of Hampshire County and Its People, Past and Present. Parsons, West Virginia: McClain Printing Company. ISBN 978-0-87012-236-1. OCLC 3121468.
- Fairmont State Normal School (1912–1916). Catalogue of the Fairmont State Normal School. Fairmont, West Virginia: Fairmont State Normal School. OCLC 61330120.
- Maxwell, Hu; Swisher, Howard Llewellyn (1897). History of Hampshire County, West Virginia From Its Earliest Settlement to the Present. Morgantown, West Virginia: A. Brown Boughner, Printer. OCLC 680931891. OL 23304577M.
- Munske, Roberta R.; Kerns, Wilmer L., eds. (2004). Hampshire County, West Virginia, 1754–2004. Romney, West Virginia: The Hampshire County 250th Anniversary Committee. ISBN 978-0-9715738-2-6. OCLC 55983178.
- Swisher, Howard Llewellyn (1899). Briar Blossoms: Being a Collection of a Few Verses and Some Prose. Morgantown, West Virginia: Acme Publishing Company. OCLC 10537445.
- Swisher, Howard Llewellyn (1908). Book of Harangues. Morgantown, West Virginia: The Chief's Print Shop. OCLC 14036741.
- Swisher, Howard Llewellyn, ed. (1901–1909). "Harangues to the Ghourki". The Ghourki. 2–5. Morgantown, West Virginia. OCLC 680460732. Archived from the original on November 6, 2014.
- West Virginia University (1901). The Manticola. Vol. III. Morgantown, West Virginia: The Acme Publishing Company. OCLC 1049671763 – via Internet Archive.
