= Largent Bridge =

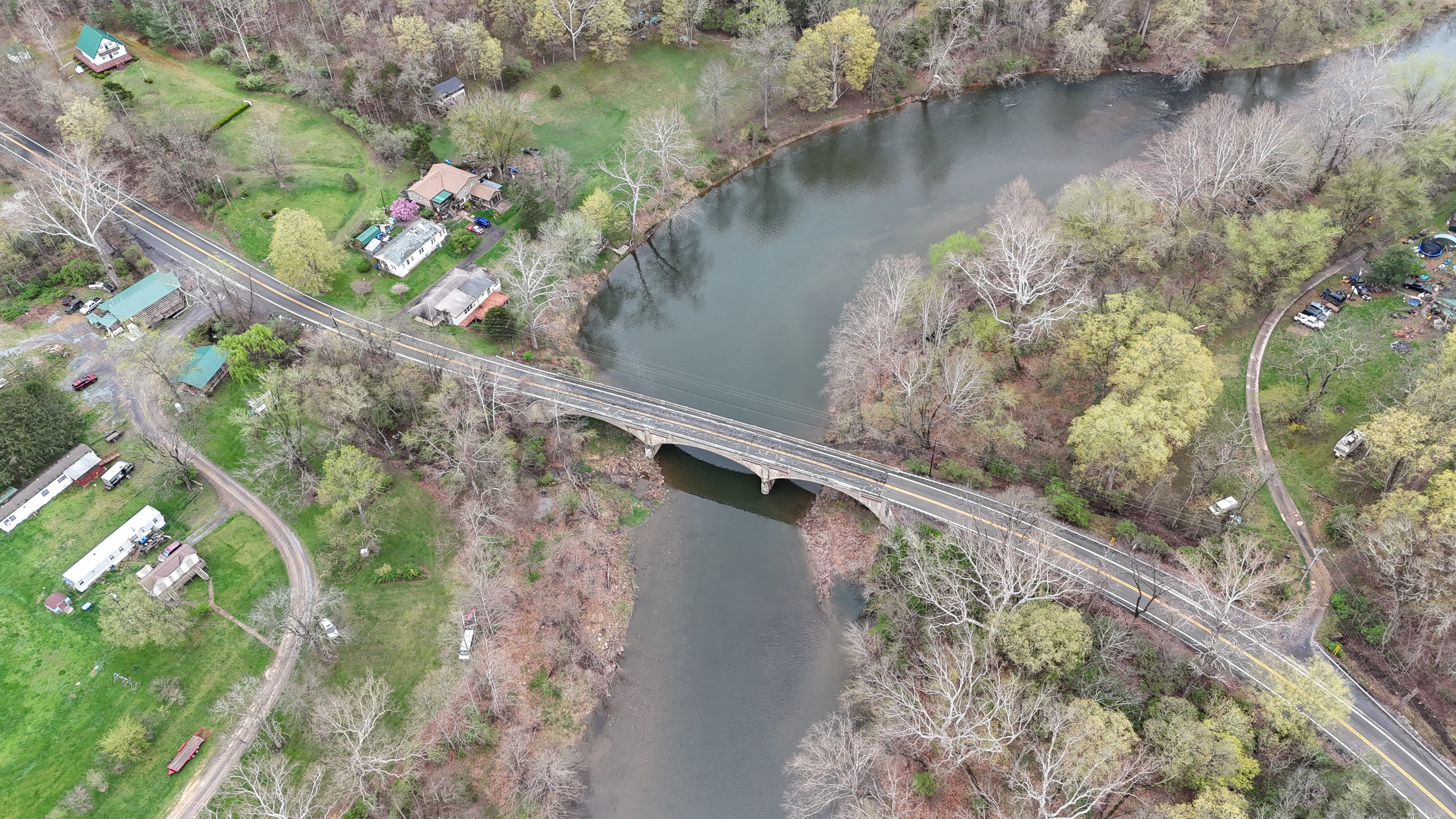
- Largent Bridge, April 2025
- Coordinates: 39°28′52″N 78°23′04″W
- Carries: WV 9
- Crosses: Cacapon River
- Locale: Morgan County, West Virginia, United States
- Named for: Largent
- Maintained by: West Virginia Division of Highways
- NRHP #: 100012204

Characteristics
- Design: Concrete arch

History
- Architect: Daniel B. Luten
- Constructed by: Luten Bridge Company (1916); J.M. Francesa and Company (1935)
- Built: 1916–1918; 1935 (widened)
- Largent Bridge
- U.S. National Register of Historic Places
- NRHP reference No.: 100012204
- Added to NRHP: September 8, 2025

Location
- Interactive map of Largent Bridge

The Largent Bridge is located on WV Route 9 in Morgan County, WV. It is a multi-arched closed spandrel concrete bridge originally constructed by the Luten Bridge Company. It is characteristic of the work pioneered by Daniel Luten and was originally built between 1916 and 1918 as a single lane bridge. It was widened to two lanes in 1935 with funding from the New Deal program to address the increased traffic on WV Route 9. The bridge crosses the Cacapon River just west of the small community of Largent.

The structure is a concrete arch continuous deck bridge 26 feet wide and 254 feet long. The bridge requires three arches to span the Cacapon River with the maximum span being 82 feet. The bridge was constructed in two phases 17 years apart with the second phase funded by the Works Progress Administration (WPA) in 1935. Indication of the two distinct phases is readily evident when looking at the underside of the bridge. The bridge was widened by the J.M. Francesa & Company of Fayetteville, WV. While Luten is well known for his work, the WV Historic Bridge Inventory Form completed as part of the 2015 WV Bridge Survey noted the bridge's designer of the 1935 widening [credited on the bridge plaque as the "J.M. Francesa & Company"] was recognized for their distinguishable work within the state of West Virginia. The widening of the bridge in 1935 validated Luten's claims that his concrete arch bridges could be readily widened as traffic increased as automobiles became more prevalent which was not the same case for steel truss bridges.

The Largent Bridge was individually listed on the National Register of Historic Places on September 8, 2025, under both Criterion A for its association with changing transportation patterns, and Criterion C for its association with Daniel Luten and his advancements in concrete bridge design.
