= Baker Mountain (West Virginia) =

Mountain ridge in West Virginia, United States

- Location within West Virginia

Highest point
- Elevation: 2,060 ft (630 m)
- Listing: Mountains of West Virginia
- Coordinates: 39°08′17.55″N 78°34′50.17″W

Geography
- Location: Hampshire County, West Virginia, U.S.
- Parent range: Ridge-and-Valley Appalachians
- Topo map: USGS Yellow Spring

Climbing
- Easiest route: Hike

Baker Mountain is a mountain ridge in southeastern Hampshire County, West Virginia. The mountain runs southwest northeast between Yellow Spring and the Hardy County line. Baker Mountain is flanked to its east by the Cacapon River with West Virginia Route 259 running parallel between the two. Its forests were once used as a major source of timber for the Baltimore and Ohio Railroad's rail ties. For this reason, the Winchester and Western Railroad was constructed through the Capon Valley in the 1920s to haul the timber harvested in the region to Winchester, Virginia for railroad tie production. The communities of Capon Lake and Intermont lie at the foot of Baker Mountain on the Cacapon.
