= Bubbling Spring, West Virginia =

Unincorporated community in West Virginia, United States

- Unincorporated community
- Location within Eastern Panhandle of West Virginia Location within West Virginia Location within the United States
- Coordinates: 39°15′15″N 78°27′29″W
- Country: United States
- State: West Virginia
- County: Hampshire
- Time zone: UTC-5 (Eastern (EST))
  - Summer (DST): UTC-4 (EDT)
- GNIS feature ID: 1554012

Bubbling Spring is an unincorporated community in Hampshire County in the U.S. state of West Virginia. Bubbling Spring is situated on Cacapon River Road (West Virginia Secondary Route 14) along the Cacapon River, south of Capon Bridge and north of Hooks Mills. It takes its name from the Bubbling Spring on the Cacapon River. Bubbling Spring has been known as Bubbling Spring Camps, Cacapon Bubbling Spring Camps, and Crystal Spring.
