= Davis Ford, West Virginia =

Unincorporated community in West Virginia, United States

- Unincorporated community
- Location within West Virginia Location within the United States
- Coordinates: 39°11′47″N 78°30′2″W
- Country: United States
- State: West Virginia
- County: Hampshire
- Time zone: UTC-5 (Eastern (EST))
  - Summer (DST): UTC-4 (EDT)
- GNIS feature ID: 1550878

Davis Ford is an unincorporated community on the Cacapon River in Hampshire County in the U.S. state of West Virginia. It lies primarily on Cacapon River Road (West Virginia Secondary Route 14) at the ford from which it takes its name. The Yellow Spring post office serves the Davis Ford community.
