= Woodrow, Hampshire and Morgan Counties, West Virginia =

Woodrow
- Unincorporated community
- Location within West Virginia Location within the United States
- Coordinates: 39°29′57″N 78°26′11″W
- Country: United States
- State: West Virginia
- County: Hampshire
- Time zone: UTC-5 (Eastern (EST))
  - Summer (DST): UTC-4 (EDT)
- GNIS feature ID: 1557990

Woodrow is an unincorporated community that lies south of Paw Paw along West Virginia Route 9 in both Hampshire and Morgan Counties in West Virginia's Eastern Panhandle. Woodrow lies on the eastern flanks of Spring Gap Mountain with Sideling Hill to its east. Woodrow Union Church has served the community since the late 19th century.
