= Captain David Pugh House =

Historic house in West Virginia, United States

- Captain David Pugh House; Riversdell
- U.S. National Register of Historic Places
- Location within Eastern Panhandle of West Virginia Location within West Virginia Location within the United States
- Location: Cacapon River Road; Hooks Mills, West Virginia, USA
- Coordinates: 39°14′35″N 78°27′47″W
- Area: 34.8 acres (14.1 ha)
- Built: 1835
- Architectural style: Federal
- NRHP reference No.: 04000913
- Added to NRHP: August 25, 2004

The Captain David Pugh House is a historic 19th-century Federal-style residence on the Cacapon River in the unincorporated community of Hooks Mills in Hampshire County, West Virginia, United States. It is also known by its current farm name, Riversdell. It is a 2 1/2-story frame dwelling built in 1835. It sits on a stone foundation and has a 2 1/2-story addition built in 1910. The front facade features a centered porch with shed roof supported by two Tuscan order columns. The rear has a two-story, full-width porch recessed under the gable roof. Also on the property are a contributing spring house (c. 1835), shed (c. 1900), outhouse (c. 1930), and stone wall (c. 1835).

It was listed on the National Register of Historic Places in 2004.

== See also ==
- List of historic sites in Hampshire County, West Virginia
- National Register of Historic Places listings in Hampshire County, West Virginia
