= Short Mountain (West Virginia) =

Mountain in the U.S. state of West Virginia

Highest point
- Elevation: 2,872 ft (875 m)
- Coordinates: 39°05′50″N 78°44′34″W

Geography
- Location: Hampshire / Hardy counties, West Virginia, U.S.
- Parent range: Ridge-and-valley Appalachians
- Topo map(s): USGS Baker, Needmore, Rio

Climbing
- Easiest route: Hike

Short Mountain is a mountain ridge that runs southwest northeast through Hampshire and Hardy counties in West Virginia's Eastern Panhandle, rising to its greatest elevation at Bald Knob near Arkansaw, West Virginia. Short Mountain's name is derived from its original name of Short Arse Mountain.

== See also ==
- Short Mountain Wildlife Management Area
