= Mill Branch (Cacapon River tributary) =

US stream in West Virginia

Coordinates: 39°17′24″N 78°26′12″W

Mill Branch is a 9.1-mile-long (14.6 km) tributary stream of the Cacapon River, belonging to the Potomac River and Chesapeake Bay watersheds. The stream is located in eastern Hampshire County in West Virginia's Eastern Panhandle.

== Headwaters and course ==
Mill Branch rises from mountain springs on Timber Ridge (1,306 feet/398 m) south of West Virginia Route 127 near the community of Good. The stream meanders in a southwesterly direction along the western flanks of Timber Ridge, with Bear Garden Mountain (1,339 feet/408 m) bounding it to its west. Mill Branch continues to flow in a southwesterly direction between the two mountain ridges with Smokey Hollow Road (County Route 6) paralleling the stream to its east. The stream flows beneath the Northwestern Turnpike (U.S. Route 50), continuing to flow along the eastern flank of Bear Garden Mountain. At the southern edge of Bear Garden Mountain, Mill Branch curves to the northwest and shortly after flowing beneath Christian Church Road, it empties into the Cacapon River south of Capon Bridge.

== See also ==
- List of West Virginia rivers
