= Sector, West Virginia =

- Unincorporated community
- Location within West Virginia Location within the United States
- Coordinates: 39°13′41″N 78°51′21″W
- Country: United States
- State: West Virginia
- County: Hampshire
- Elevation: 728 ft (222 m)
- Time zone: UTC-5 (Eastern (EST))
  - Summer (DST): UTC-4 (EDT)
- ZIP code: 26757
- GNIS feature ID: 1560601

Sector is an unincorporated community in Hampshire County in the U.S. state of West Virginia. It is located along the west bank of the South Branch Potomac River on Fleming-Sector Road (West Virginia Secondary Route 8/3) across the river from the community of Glebe.

Sector grew as a result of its operation of a post office and station on the South Branch Valley Railroad in the early 20th century. On the railroad, it was known as Glebe Station because of its proximity to Glebe. A suspension bridge once connected the two communities via Fleming-Sector Road, but this was repeatedly demolished by a succession of serious floods, most recently in the late 1930s or early 1940s after which it was not rebuilt.
