= Castle Mountain (Hampshire County, West Virginia) =

Mountain ridge in West Virginia, United States

- Location within West Virginia

Highest point
- Elevation: 1,266 ft (386 m)
- Coordinates: 39°23′37″N 78°25′07″W

Geography
- Location: Hampshire County, West Virginia, U.S.
- Parent range: Ridge-and-Valley Appalachians
- Topo map: USGS Largent

Climbing
- Easiest route: Hike

Castle Mountain is a forested mountain ridge that lies along the Cacapon River south of its confluence with the North River at Forks of Cacapon in Hampshire County, West Virginia, United States. The mountain is named for the Caudy's Castle (also known as Castle Rock) rock outcrop pillar that lies on its southern end overlooking the Cacapon River. Castle Run, which runs along its western flank into the North River, also takes its name from the outcrop. The ridge runs from southwest to northeast and can be viewed from the Bloomery Pike (West Virginia Route 127).
