= Cold Stream, West Virginia =

Unincorporated community in West Virginia, United States

- Unincorporated community
- Location within Eastern Panhandle of West Virginia Location within West Virginia Location within the United States
- Coordinates: 39°20′22″N 78°26′31″W
- Country: United States
- State: West Virginia
- County: Hampshire
- Time zone: UTC-5 (Eastern (EST))
  - Summer (DST): UTC-4 (EDT)
- GNIS feature ID: 1554174

Cold Stream is an unincorporated community in Hampshire County in the U.S. state of West Virginia. Cold Stream is located north of Capon Bridge on Cold Stream Road (West Virginia Secondary Route 15). Referred to as Edwards Run in its past, the community of Cold Stream is in proximity to where Edwards Run empties into the Cacapon River. The community most likely took its name from a nearby stream of the same name noted for the cold water it contains. Their post office has been closed.
