= Short Mountain Wildlife Management Area =

State Wildlife Management Area in Hampshire County, West Virginia

- IUCN category V (protected landscape/seascape)
- Location within West Virginia
- Location: Hampshire, West Virginia, United States
- Coordinates: 39°11′33″N 78°40′11″W
- Area: 8,005 acres (32.40 km^{2})
- Elevation: 2,049 ft (625 m)
- Website: WVDNR District 2 Wildlife Management Areas

Short Mountain Wildlife Management Area is located on 8,005 acres (32.40 km^{2}) eight miles (13 km) south of Augusta off Augusta-Ford Hill Road (County Route 7) in Hampshire County, West Virginia. Short Mountain WMA is owned by the West Virginia Division of Natural Resources.

Short Mountain WMA lies between the two mountain ridges of Short Mountain (2,864 feet [873 m]) that form a long horseshoe-shaped basin with Meadow Run flowing through its center. Almost all of the WMA is covered in mixed oak and Virginia pine. Hunting is available for wild turkey, deer, squirrel, and ruffed grouse. Short Mountain WMA's southern boundary, located west of Rio, is formed in part by one-half mile (0.80 km) of the North River, which is periodically stocked with trout between February and May by the WVDNR. Six primitive camping areas are distributed around the area. A nominal camping fee is charged by the WVDNR.

Short Mountain WMA is also popular with bird watchers for its wetland species and late spring breeders.

== See also ==
- Animal conservation
- Fishing
- Hunting
- List of West Virginia wildlife management areas
