= Ridge, West Virginia =

Ridge
- Unincorporated community
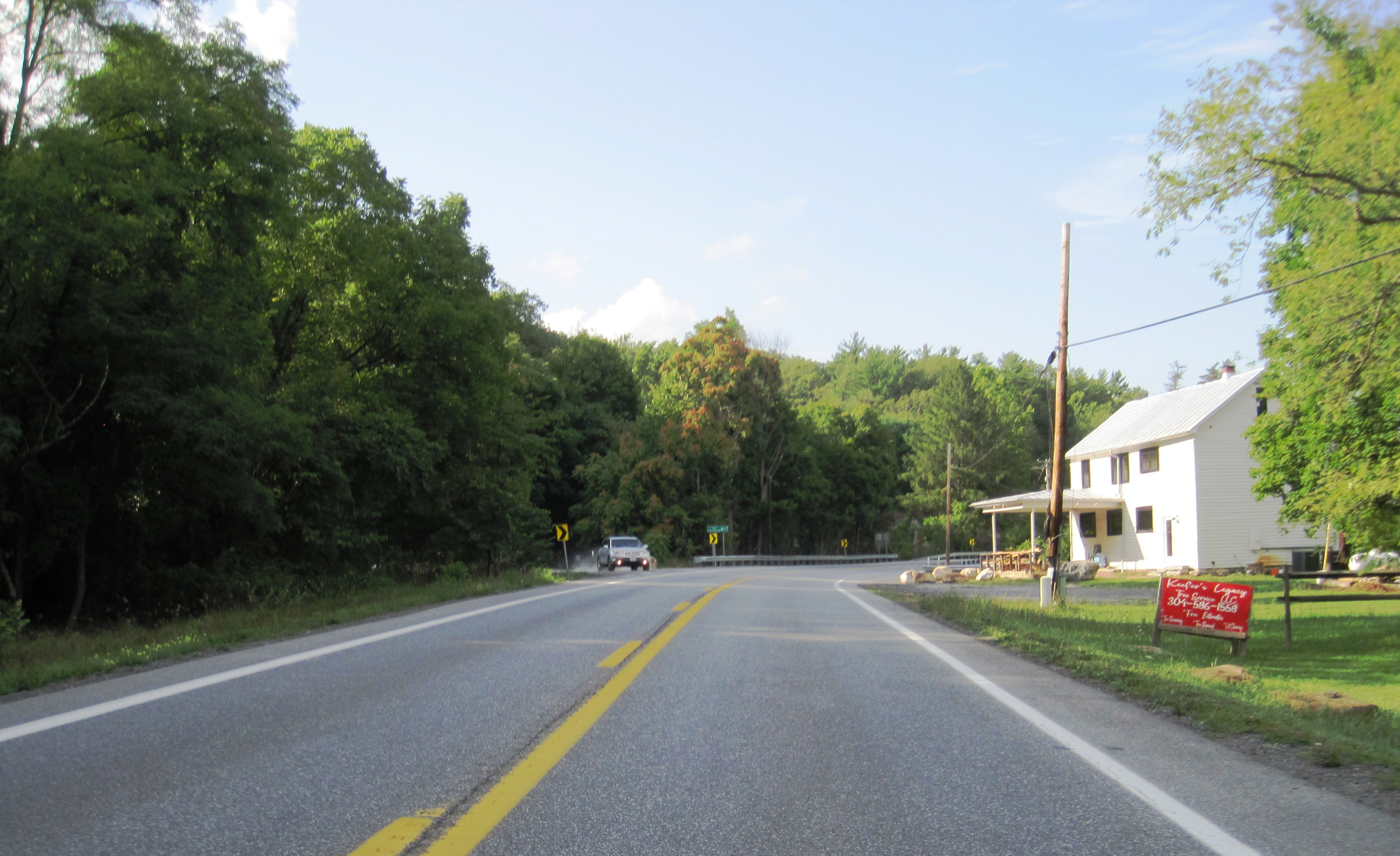
- US 522 in Ridge

- Location within the state of West Virginia Ridge (the United States)
- Coordinates: 39°27′46″N 78°18′45″W
- Country: United States
- State: West Virginia
- County: Morgan
- Time zone: UTC-5 (Eastern (EST))
  - Summer (DST): UTC-4 (EDT)
- GNIS feature ID: 1545575

Ridge is an unincorporated community hamlet in Morgan County, West Virginia. It is located along Valley Road (U.S. Highway 522) at its intersection with Fish Hatchery Road (CR 38/10) near the Frederick County, Virginia line. Sleepy Creek and Timber Ridge lie to its east with Warm Springs Ridge lying to its west.

== History ==
The community was named for the fact the town site rests upon a ridge.
