= Brandywine, Virginia =

Unincorporated community in Virginia, United States

Coordinates: 37°29′18.9″N 79°9′10″W

Brandywine is an unincorporated community in Caroline County, in the U.S. state of Virginia.
