= Mountain Falls, Virginia =

Unincorporated community in Virginia, United States

- Unincorporated community
- Location within Virginia Location within the United States
- Coordinates: 39°7′2″N 78°23′44″W
- Country: United States
- State: Virginia
- County: Frederick
- Time zone: UTC−5 (Eastern (EST))
  - Summer (DST): UTC−4 (EDT)
- GNIS feature ID: 1485677

Mountain Falls is an unincorporated community in Frederick County, Virginia, United States. Mountain Falls is situated near the confluence of Richards Run and Fall Run, from which it takes its name. Mountain Falls is also the location of the crossroads of Wardensville Grade, Back Mountain Road, and Mountain Falls Road.
