= Levels, West Virginia =

- Unincorporated community
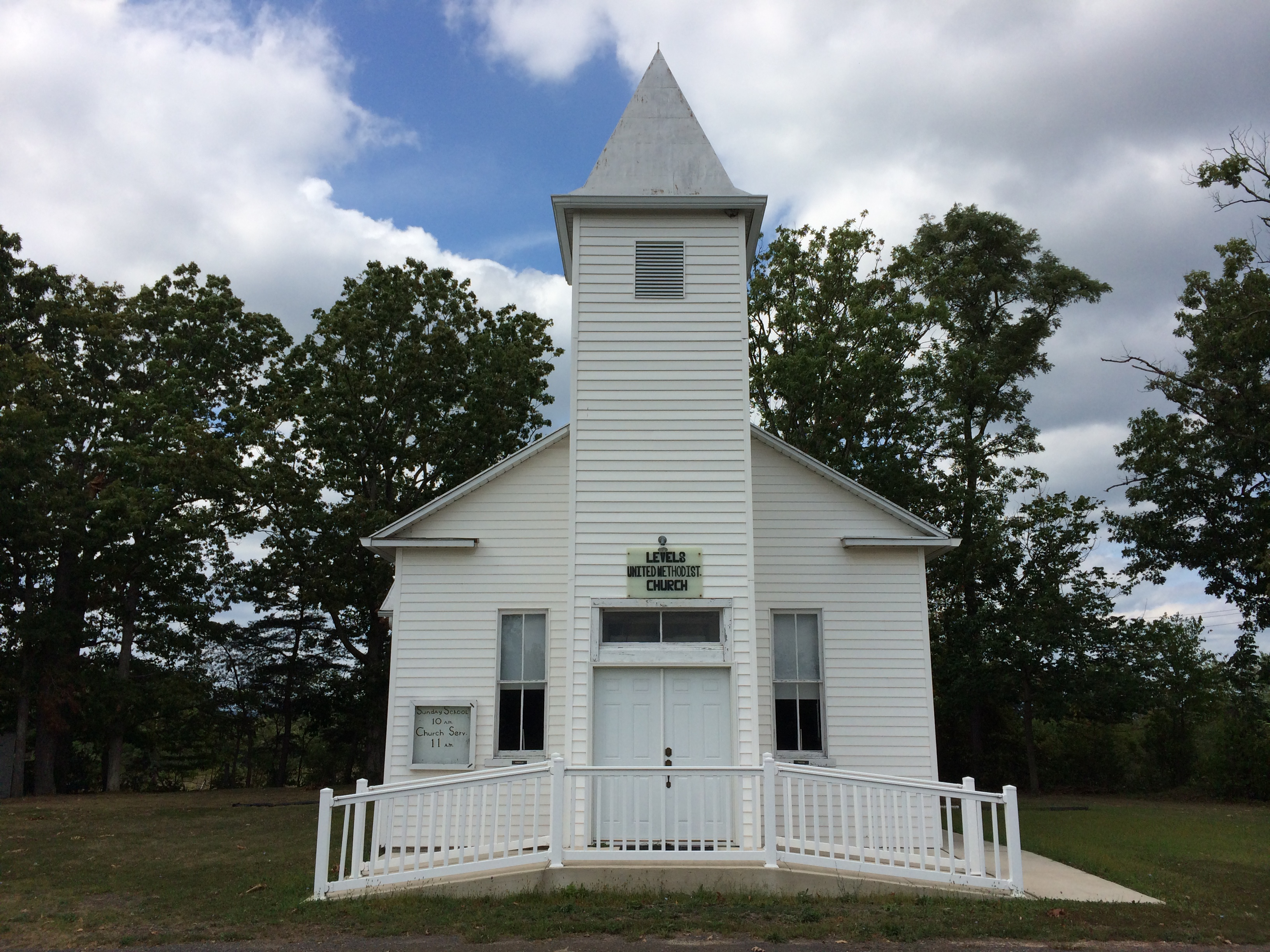
- Levels United Methodist Church

- Location within West Virginia Location within the United States
- Coordinates: 39°29′4″N 78°33′13″W
- Country: United States
- State: West Virginia
- County: Hampshire

Population (2000)
  - Total: 147
- Time zone: UTC-5 (Eastern (EST))
  - Summer (DST): UTC-4 (EDT)
- ZIP codes: 25431
- GNIS feature ID: 1541801

Levels is an unincorporated community in Hampshire County in the U.S. state of West Virginia. According to the 2000 census, the Levels community has a population of 147. It is home to John J. Cornwell Elementary School.

The community was so named on account of the relatively level original town site. Levels was originally known as Levels Cross Roads because of its location at the intersection of four roads in north-central Hampshire County: Bright's Hollow Road (County Route 5/5) north to Okonoko, Little Cacapon-Levels Road (County Route 3/3) southeast to Slanesville, Jersey Mountain Road (County Route 5) south to Romney, and Frenches Station Road (County Route 5/7) northwest to South Branch Depot.

== Notable residents ==
- Howard Llewellyn Swisher (1870–1945), American businessperson, real estate developer, and historian

== Churches ==
- Church of the Brethren
  - Capon Chapel Church of the Brethren, Little Cacapon-Levels Road (CR 3/3)
  - Oak Grove Church of the Brethren, Jersey Mountain Road (CR 5)
- Methodist
  - Levels United Methodist Church, Jersey Mountain Road (CR 5)

== Bibliography ==
- Brannon, Selden W. (1976). Historic Hampshire: A Symposium of Hampshire County and Its People, Past and Present. Parsons, West Virginia: McClain Printing Company. ISBN 978-0-87012-236-1. OCLC 3121468.
