= Cacapon River =

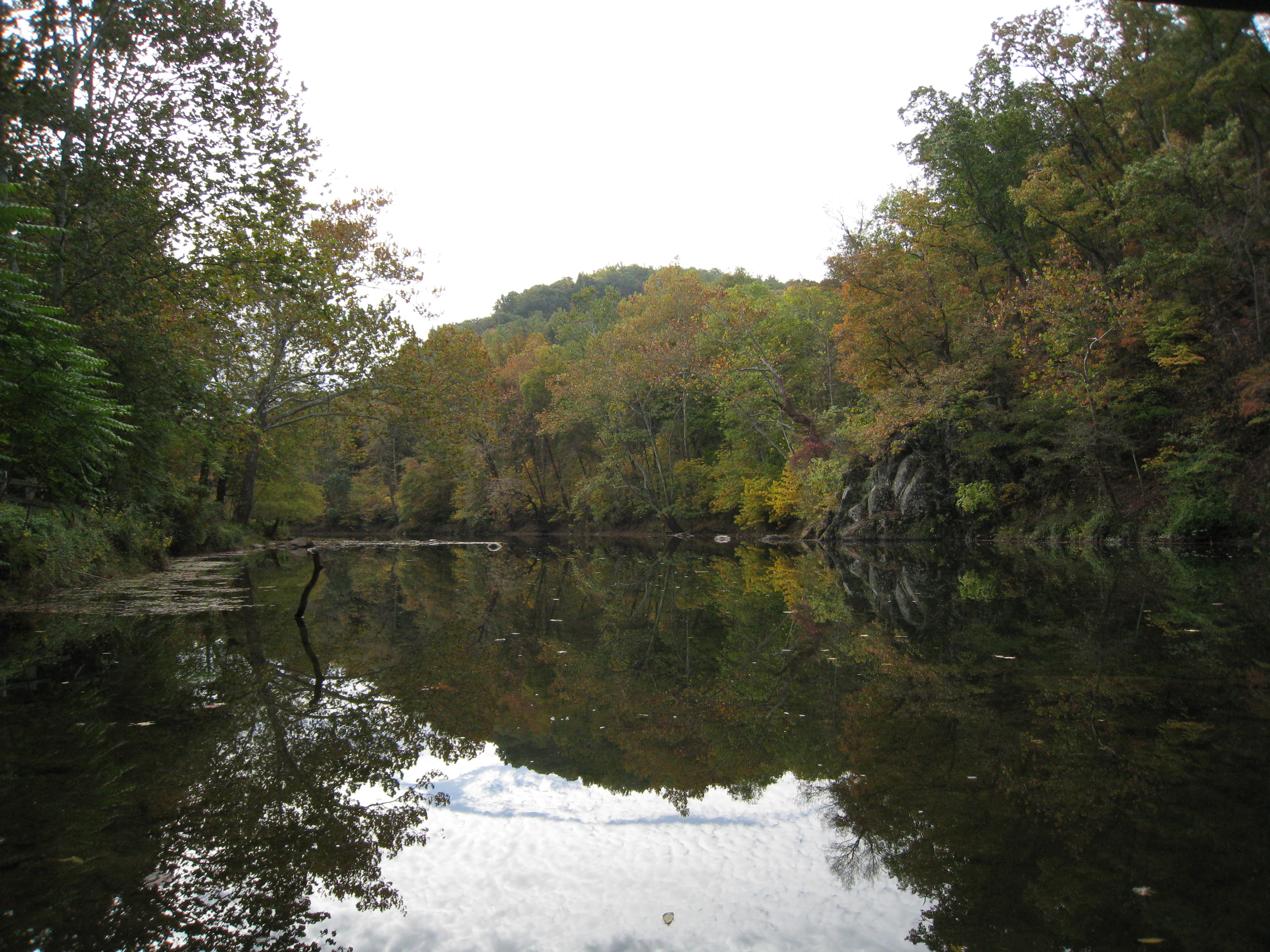
- The Cacapon River looking south from the Cacapon River Rt 127 Bridge Public Access Site

- Location of the mouth of the Cacapon River in West Virginia Cacapon River (the United States)

Location
- Country: United States
- State: West Virginia
- Counties: Hampshire, Hardy, Morgan

Physical characteristics
- Source: Lost River
  - location: Wardensville, Hardy County
  - coordinates: 39°04′52″N 78°38′10″W
- Mouth: Potomac River
  - location: Great Cacapon, Morgan County
  - coordinates: 39°37′13″N 78°16′58″W
- Length: 81.0 mi (130.4 km)
- Basin size: 680 sq mi (1,800 km^{2})
- Discharge
  - location: Great Cacapon
  - average: 592 cu ft/s (16.8 m^{3}/s)
  - minimum: 26 cu ft/s (0.74 m^{3}/s) (September 12, 1966)
  - maximum: 87,600 cu ft/s (2,480 m^{3}/s) (March 18, 1936)

The Cacapon River (locally /kəˈkeɪpən/ kə-KAY-pən; meaning Medicine Waters), located in the Appalachian Mountains of West Virginia's eastern panhandle region, is an 81.0-mile-long (130.4 km) shallow river known for its fishing, boating, wildlife, hunting, and wilderness scenery. As part of the Potomac River watershed, it is an American Heritage River.

The Cacapon River Watershed is made up of three major river segments and many smaller stream watersheds. The headwaters of the Cacapon River, known as the Lost River, is 31.1 miles (50.1 km) long and receives water from a watershed covering 178 square miles (460 km^{2}). The largest tributary of the Cacapon is the North River, which drains 206 square miles (530 km^{2}), an area comparable to that of the Lost River. Overall, the Cacapon River watershed includes the Lost and North River watersheds, and those of many smaller streams for a total of 680 square miles (1,800 km^{2}). The Cacapon watershed is itself part of the Chesapeake Bay watershed.

In recent years, the Cacapon River and its watershed have become threatened by development, and industrial and agricultural growth. Concern about these issues led to the establishment of the Cacapon Institute in 1985 (originally known as the Pine Cabin Run Ecological Laboratory).

== Course ==
=== Emergence to Hampshire County line ===
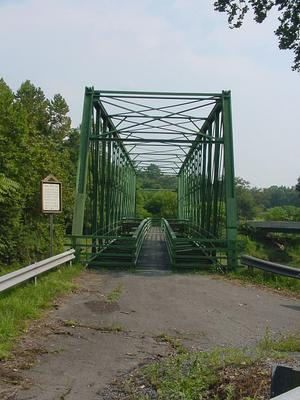
The Capon Lake Whipple Truss Bridge at Capon Lake, West Virginia

The Cacapon River emerges from underground in a gap in Sandy Ridge (1683 feet/513 m) west of Wardensville. It is actually the reemergence of the Lost River, which sinks into an underground channel east of McCauley near the entrance to Camp Pinnacle. From its emergence, the Cacapon River creates a horseshoe bend shaped gap through Sandy Ridge and flows east paralleling West Virginia Route 55/West Virginia Route 259 to its north. At Wardensville, the river is joined by Trout Run and then curves northeastward where it meanders through an expansive valley plain. Here, it is fed by Slate Rock Run and then Moores Run further north. Waites Run, a tributary draining some of the western slopes of Great North Mountain enters the Cacapon River near the bridge on Rt. 55, north of Wardensville. Shortly after its confluence with Sine Run, the Cacapon River continues north into Hampshire County.

=== Hampshire County line to Yellow Spring ===
From the county line, the river is bounded to its east by the George Washington National Forest and to its west by Baker Mountain (2024 feet/617 m). Throughout this stretch, the Cacapon River is also joined by sections of the old Winchester and Western Railroad grade. It continues its meandering course northeastward, flowing past the community of Intermont and Hebron Church. At Capon Lake, the river is joined by Capon Springs Run and is the site of the historic Capon Lake Whipple Truss Bridge. West Virginia Route 259 parallels the Cacapon River to its west along the eastern flank of Baker Mountain until the road turns east across the Kenneth Seldon Bridge at Yellow Spring. From Yellow Spring Gap, the river is fed by a run whose source is the "Yellow Spring".

=== Yellow Spring to Kale Hollow ===
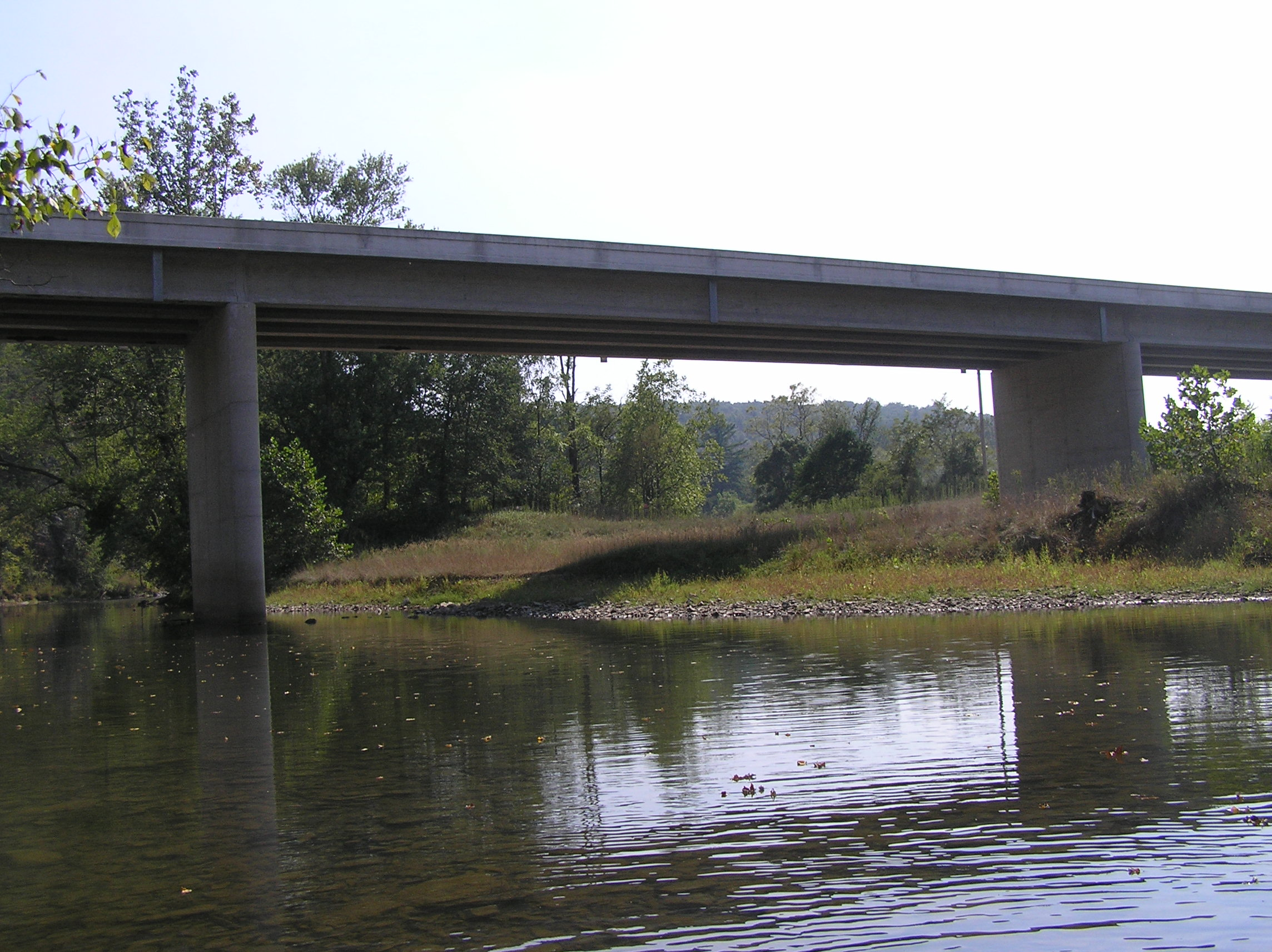
Kenneth Seldon Bridge on the Cacapon at Yellow Spring, West Virginia

The Cacapon River moves north along the eastern flank of Cacapon Mountain (1913 feet/583 m) with Cacapon River Road (West Virginia Secondary Route 14) paralleling it to its west. From Yellow Spring, the river flows by Camps Rim Rock and White Mountain. After another immense horseshoe bend, the Cacapon River moves past the communities of Hooks Mills and Bubbling Spring and is joined by Old Man Run and Kale Hollow's run. The river's stretch through Bubbling Spring is a popular location for summer river camps which consist of cottages, trailers, and campers on narrow river lots. This stretch of the Cacapon River is also the scene for numerous old plantation houses including the Captain David Pugh House (Riversdell) at Hooks Mills, listed on the National Register of Historic Places.

=== Kale Hollow to Cold Stream ===
North of Kale Hollow, the Cacapon River is joined to its west by Dillons Mountain (1913 feet/583 m). To its east, the river is paralleled by Christian Church Road (West Virginia Secondary Route 13), on which is located the 18th century Capon Chapel. After its confluence with Mill Branch, the Cacapon River bends through the small historic town of Capon Bridge. It is met by Dillons Run from its west and traversed by a bridge of the Northwestern Turnpike (U.S. Route 50), from which Capon Bridge takes its name. From Capon Bridge, the Cacapon River is bounded to its east by Bear Garden Mountain (1572 feet/479 m). It is then joined by Edwards Run and Cold Stream near the community of Cold Stream.

=== Cold Stream to Largent ===
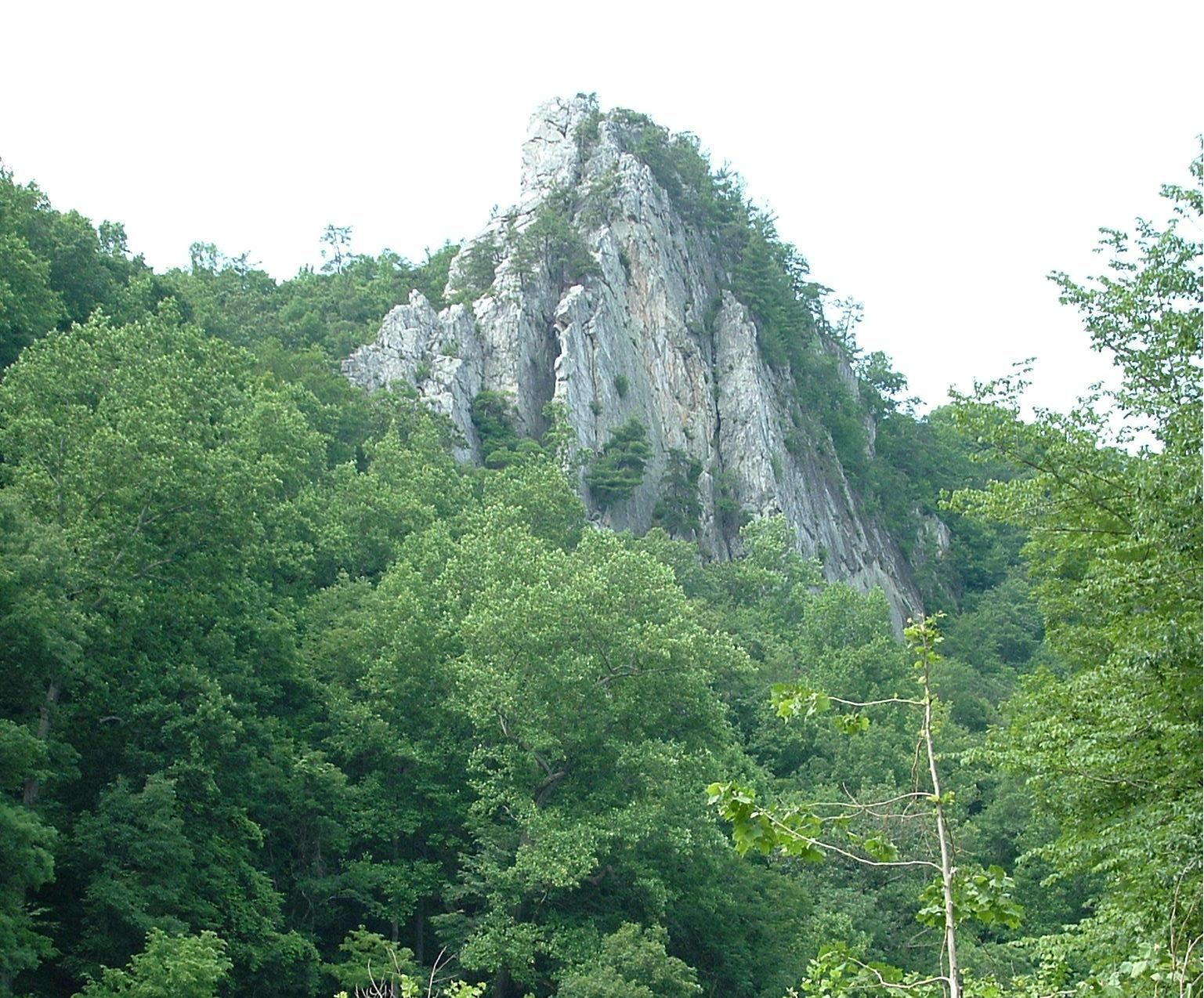
Caudy's Castle

The river meanders north around Darbys Nose (1287 feet/392 m), flanked to its east by Leith Mountain (1598 feet/487 m). The stretch of the Cacapon River between Cold Stream and Forks of Cacapon is mountainous and forested with little development. It meanders through a series of mountain ridges, on one of which, Castle Mountain (1260 feet/384 m), sits the Caudy's Castle rock outcrop. Bloomery Pike (West Virginia Route 127) passes over the river where it is met by Bloomery Run east of Forks of Cacapon. North of Bloomery Pike lies the actual "Forks of Cacapon" where the Cacapon and North Rivers converge. From Forks of Cacapon to Largent, the river creates a number of horseshoe bends between Sideling Hill (2021 feet/616 m) and Little Mountain (1429 feet/435 m). This stretch of the Cacapon River is also mostly undeveloped and forested with the exception of a gated community, The Crossings, located between the WV 127 bridge and Largent.

=== Largent to Great Cacapon ===
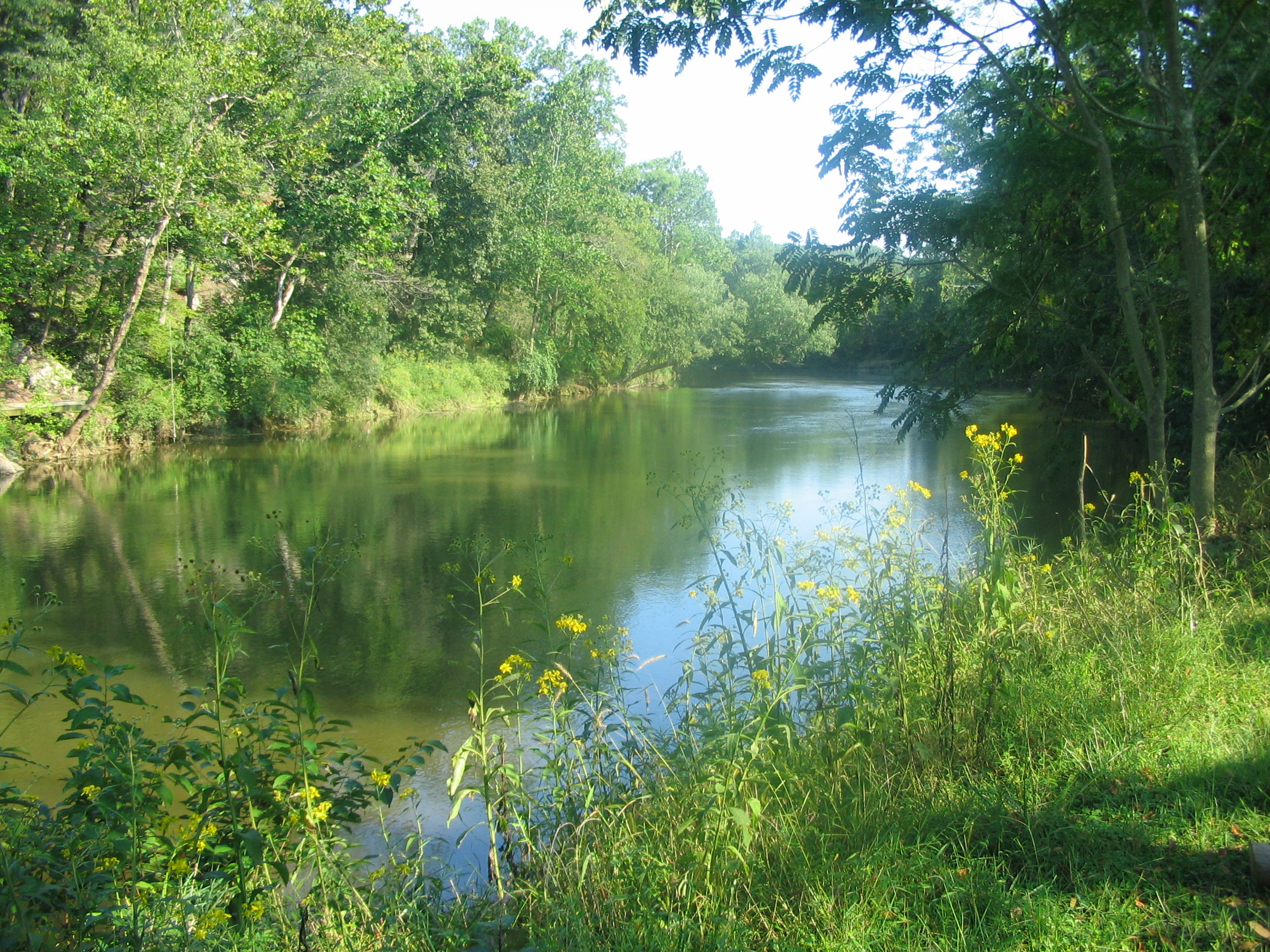
Capapon River, at Timber Ridge Camp.

The Cacapon River meanders into Morgan County at Largent where Cacapon Road (West Virginia Route 9) passes over it and the river is met by Stony Creek. It continues its meandering course northeast between Sideling Hill and Little Mountain until Fisher's Bridge where it is joined to its east by the western flanks of Cacapon Mountain. Tonoloway Ridge (992 feet/302 m) then bounds the Cacapon River to its west until it reaches the railroad hamlet of Great Cacapon. After passing under the WV 9 and old Baltimore and Ohio Railroad bridges, the Cacapon River joins the Potomac.

== Name and variants ==
Cacapon is a name derived from the Shawnee language, meaning "medicine water".

The Board on Geographic Names decided on "Cacapon River" in 1916 as the river's official name and spelling. Variants include:

- Big Capon River
- Cacapehon Creek
- Cacapehon River
- Cacapon Creek
- Cacapon River
- Cackapehon River
- Cackapohon River
- Capcappin Creek
- Cape Capon River
- Capecapon River
- Capon River
- Great Cacapehon River
- Great Cacapon River
- Great Capon River

== Bridges ==
| Bridge | Route | Location |
|---|---|---|
| Wardensville Bridge | State Route 259 (WV 259) | Wardensville |
| New Capon Lake Bridge | Capon Springs Road (CR 16) | Capon Lake |
| Whipple Truss Bridge | Pedestrian Walkway | Capon Lake |
| Kenneth Seldon Bridge | State Route 259 (WV 259) | Yellow Spring |
| Army Corporal Rex Marcel Sherman Memorial Bridge | Northwestern Turnpike (US 50) | Capon Bridge |
| Cacapon River Bridge | Bloomery Pike (WV 127) | Forks of Cacapon |
| The Crosses | Deer Meadow Rd (CR 29/4) | Capon Crossing, WV |
| Largent Bridge | Cacapon Road (WV 9) | Largent |
| Fisher's Bridge | Cacapon Road (WV 9) | North of Largent |
| Rockford Bridge | Rockford Road (CR 7) | Great Cacapon |
| Powerhouse Bridge | Powerhouse Road (CR 9/12) | Great Cacapon |
| Great Cacapon Bridge | Cacapon Road (WV 9) | Great Cacapon |
| Great Cacapon Railroad Bridge | Baltimore and Ohio Railroad | Great Cacapon |

== Float trips ==
All locations listed below are designated public access sites by the West Virginia Division of Natural Resources at their website. Access sites are listed from south to north.

| Put In | Take Out | Distance |
|---|---|---|
| Wardensville Bridge | Capon Lake Bridge | 8.5 miles (13.7 km) |
| Capon Lake Bridge | Cold Stream | 19 miles (31 km) |
| Cold Stream | WV Route 127 Bridge | 7 miles (11 km) |
| WV Route 127 Bridge | Cacapon Crossings | 9 miles (14 km) |
| Cacapon Crossings | Largent, South | 6.7 miles (10.8 km) |
| Largent, South | Power Plant | 20 miles (32 km) |
| Power Plant | Great Cacapon WV Route 9 Bridge | 1.8 miles (2.9 km) |

== Tributaries ==
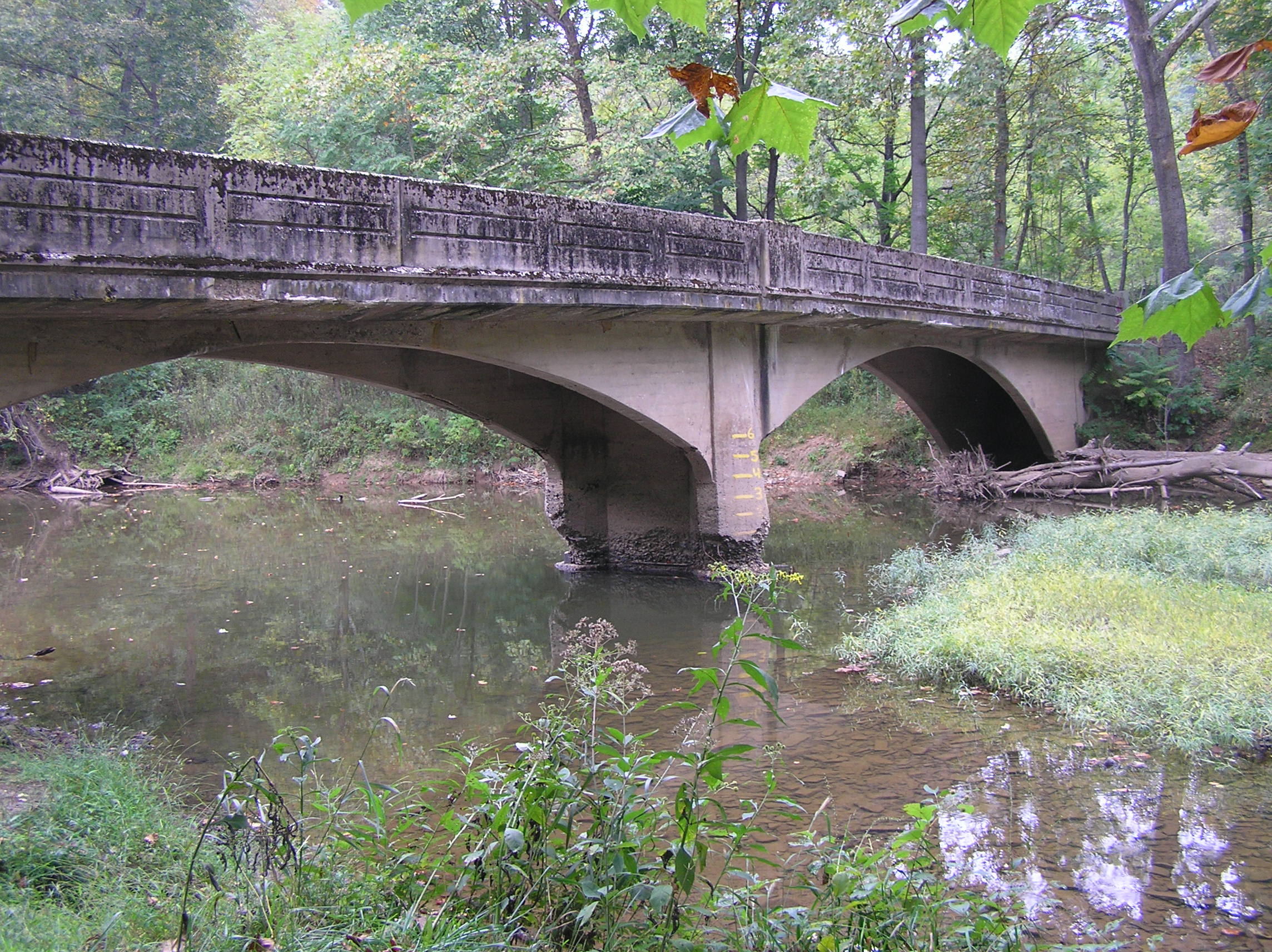
North River near North River Mills, West Virginia.

Tributary streams are listed from south to north. Major tributaries are listed in bold.

- **Lost River**
- **Trout Run**
- Waites Run
- Slate Rock Run
- Moores Run
- Sine Run
- Harness Run
- Hawk Run
- **Capon Springs Run**
  - Himmelwright Run
  - Dry Run
- Yellow Spring Run
- Falling Run
- Loman Branch
- Crooked Run
- Old Man Run
- Kale Hollow Run
- **Mill Branch**
- **Dillons Run**
  - Gunbarrel Hollow Run
  - Parks Hollow Run

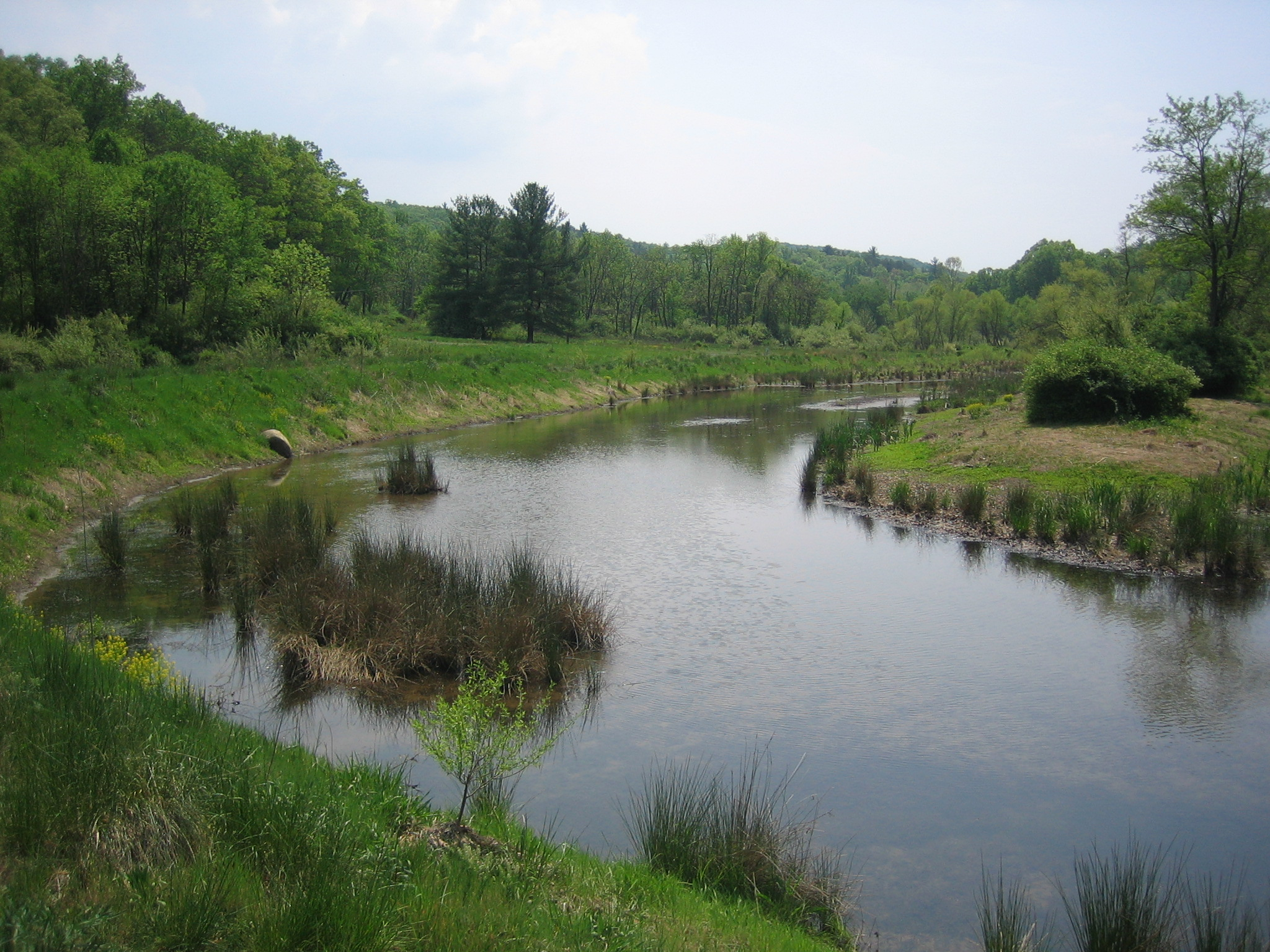
Edwards Run at Edwards Run Wildlife Management Area.

- **Edwards Run** and Edwards Run Lake
- Cold Stream
  - Frog Hollow Run
- Bloomery Run
  - Ivy Run
- **North River**
  - **Grassy Lick Run**
  - **Tearcoat Creek**
    - **Bearwallow Creek**
- Bowers Run
- Wolf Hollow Run
- Critton Run
- Falling Spring Run
- Stony Creek
- Constant Run
  - Whisners Run
- Connor Hollow Run

== Cities and towns along the Cacapon River ==
- Bubbling Spring
- Capon Bridge
- Capon Lake
- Cold Stream
- Davis Ford
- Forks of Cacapon
- Great Cacapon
- Hooks Mills
- Intermont
- Largent
- Wardensville
- Yellow Spring

== See also ==
- List of West Virginia rivers
