= Hooks Mills, West Virginia =

- Unincorporated community
- Location within West Virginia Location within the United States
- Coordinates: 39°14′31″N 78°27′49″W
- Country: United States
- State: West Virginia
- County: Hampshire
- Elevation: 869 ft (265 m)
- Time zone: UTC-5 (Eastern (EST))
  - Summer (DST): UTC-4 (EDT)
- Area code: 304
- GNIS feature ID: 1551487

Hooks Mills is an unincorporated community in Hampshire County, West Virginia, United States. It is located on Hooks Mill Road (West Virginia Secondary Route 13/3) which intersects Cacapon River Road (West Virginia Secondary Route 14) 4.5 miles south of Capon Bridge. Hooks Mills is named for the saw and grist mill on the Cacapon River run by the Hook family from 1848 to the late 1930s.

== History ==
John Cale, an immigrant from Germany built a cabin in the area in the 1740s. On April 6, 1750, George Washington surveyed the property that was to become the mill for a plat for Richard Arnold Jr. On February 22, 1848, Margaret Dunlap sold the property to Robert Hook for the sum of $5,600. The deed of sale stated that a mill and other improvements on the property conveyed to Hook.

In the 1820s, a one-room school house was built near the mill, George Nicholas Spaid serving as the teacher. In 1884 the River Dale school, as it was known, served the additional purpose as the site of legal proceedings.

By the late 19th and early 20th century Hooks Mills was an established community, with an inn serving the patrons of the mill, a blacksmith shed and house, the mill residence, and the Captain David Pugh House. A 1903 photograph on display in the Capon Bridge Museum shows the mill in a state of early decline. In the photo Henson Hook, the mill operator, is seen with his hand on the wheel of a horse-drawn wagon. The mill also served as the community's post office, and the mill race served as a place where the local population harvested ice in the winter. Nothing remains of the mill, which was swept away in a flood in the late 1930s, but the traces of the mill race and a few scattered foundation stones.

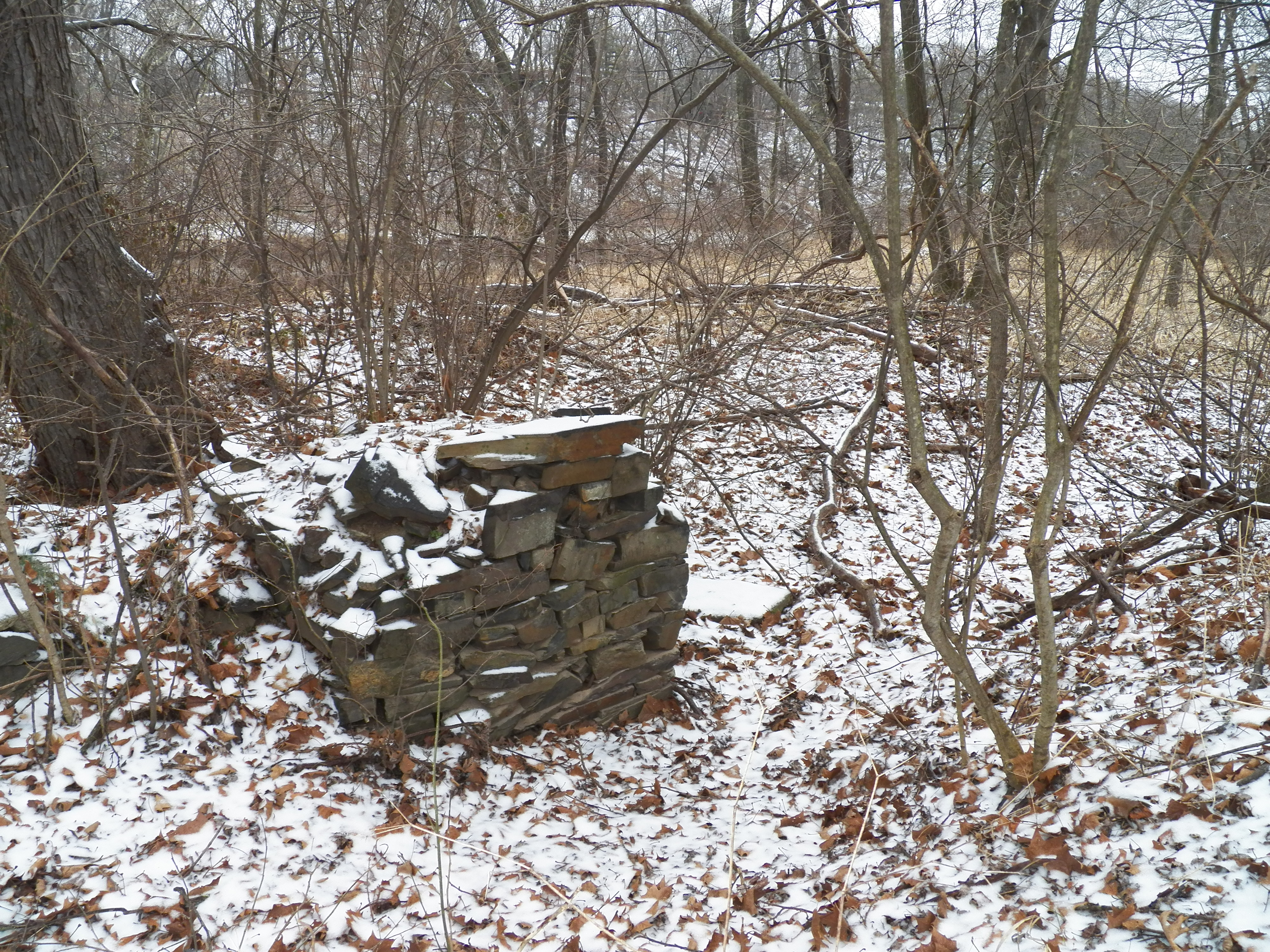
Remains of Hook's Mill

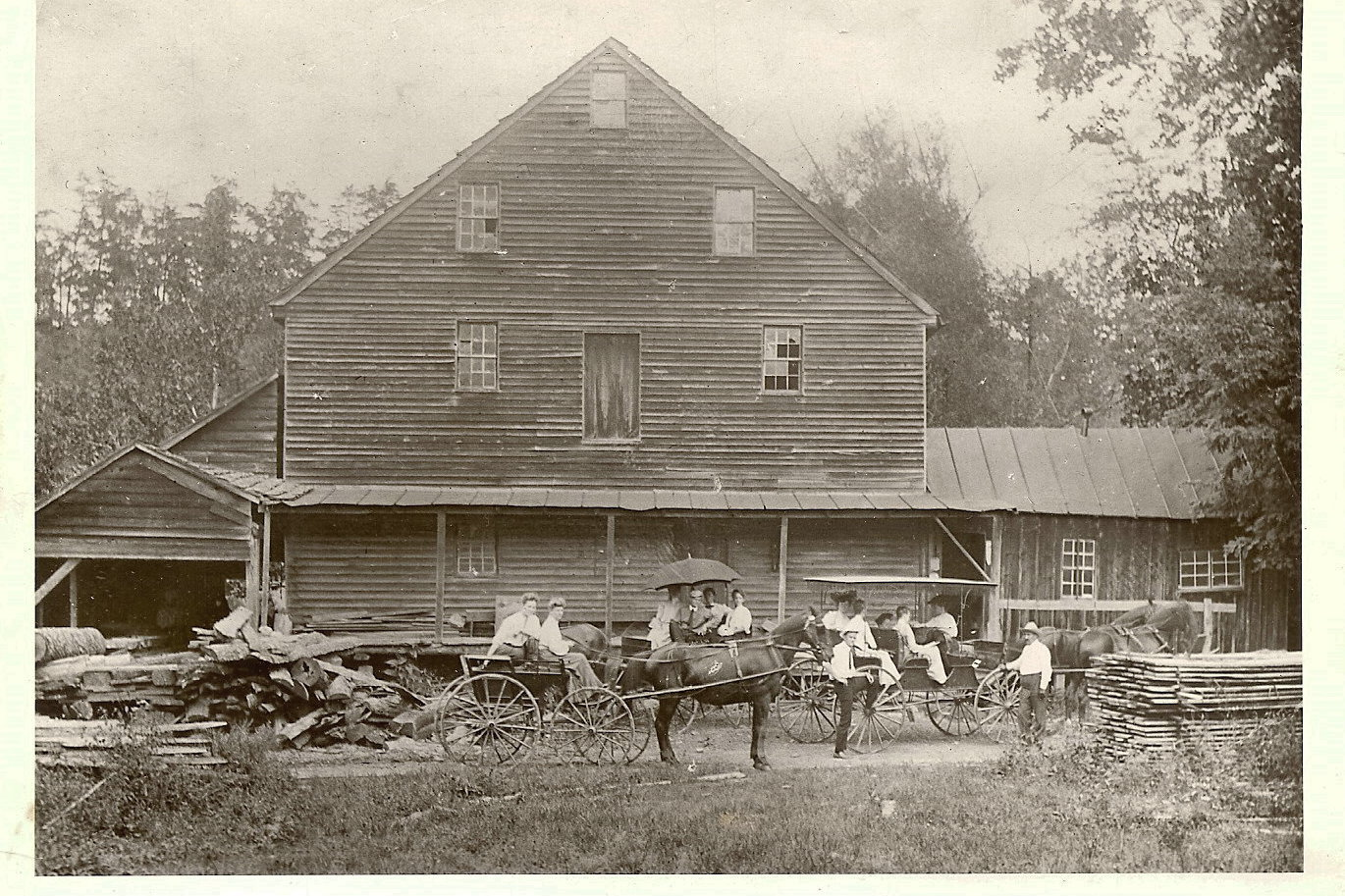
Hooks Mill, West Virginia, 1903 -- Saw and lumber mill, waterpower on left; grain was ground on imported stones from France; the post office was on the right. Flour ground from wheat at the mill was stored on the second floor, hay stored on the third floor. Henson Hook, the mill owner, can be seen dressed in white shirt with hand on front wheel of wagon.

Today, Hooks Mills is served by the Yellow Spring post office. The inn, the blacksmith's house, and the miller's house all remain as private residences.

== Historic sites ==
- Homer's Fort site, French and Indian War fort
- Riversdell (Captain David Pugh House), 1835 - Recently listed on the National Register of Historic Places
