= Great Cacapon, West Virginia =

Great Cacapon
- Census-designated place (CDP)
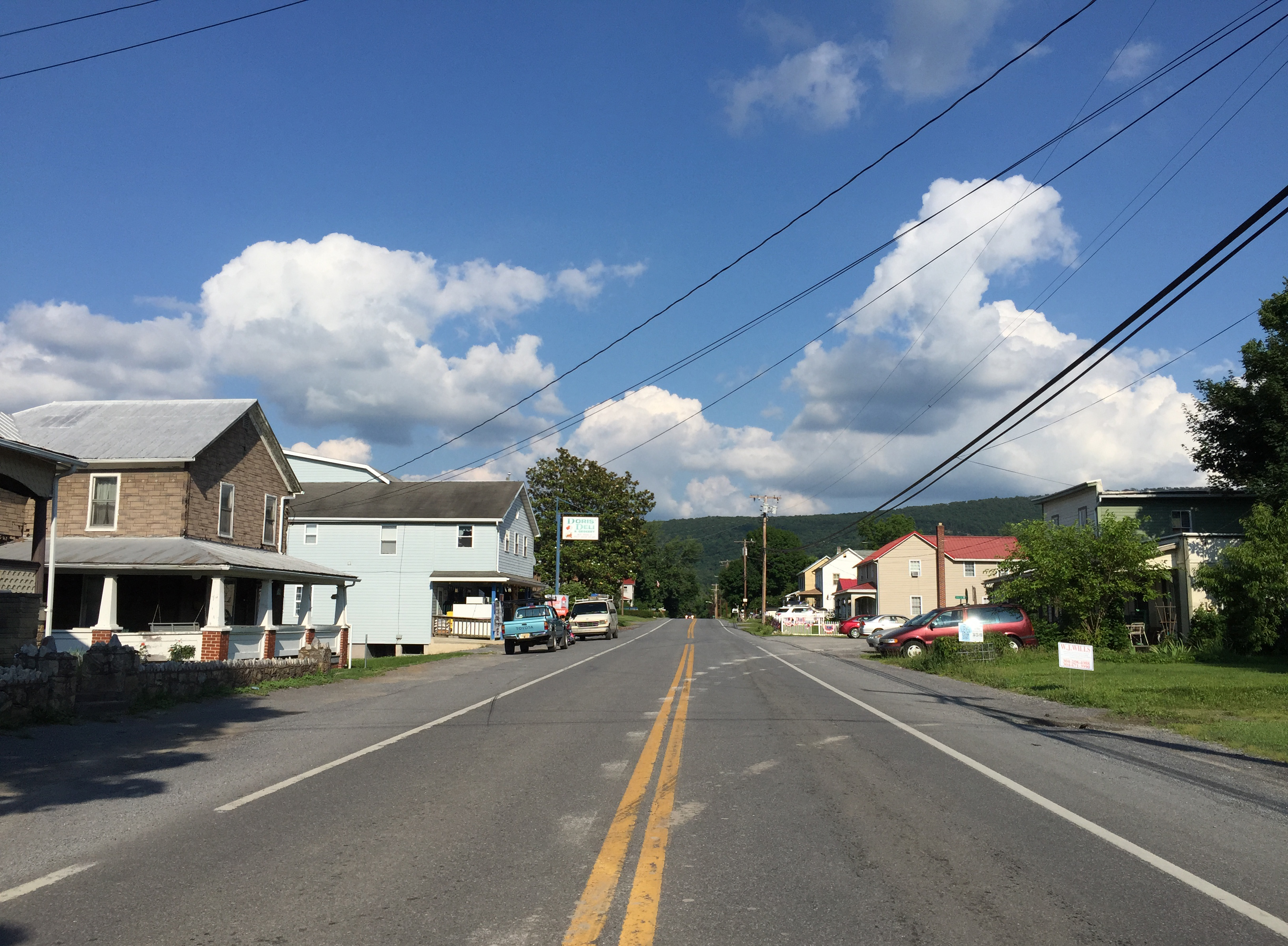
- WV 9 through Great Cacapon

- Location in Morgan County and the state of West Virginia.
- Coordinates: 39°36′52″N 78°17′09″W
- Country: United States
- State: West Virginia
- County: Morgan

Area
  - Total: 0.857 sq mi (2.22 km^{2})
  - Land: 0.857 sq mi (2.22 km^{2})
  - Water: 0 sq mi (0 km^{2})
- Elevation: 532 ft (162 m)

Population (2020)
  - Total: 315
  - Density: 368/sq mi (142/km^{2})
- Time zone: UTC-5 (Eastern (EST))
  - Summer (DST): UTC-4 (EDT)
- GNIS feature ID: 2586817

Great Cacapon (/kəˈkeɪpən/ kə-KAY-pən) is a census-designated place (CDP) in Morgan County in the U.S. state of West Virginia's Eastern Panhandle. As of the 2020 census, its population was 315 (down from 386 at the 2010 census).

== History ==
Great Cacapon takes its name from the Cacapon River (from the Native American meaning "medicine water") which empties into the Potomac River to the town's east. It was originally known as Cacapon Depot on the Baltimore and Ohio Railroad mainline when a post office was established here in 1848. In 1876, its name was changed to Great Cacapon to differentiate it from Little Cacapon which was also on the B&O mainline. It lies four miles down Cacapon Mountain from the Panorama Overlook along Cacapon Road (West Virginia Route 9) west of Berkeley Springs.

The Thurman W. Whisner Memorial Bridge at Great Cacapon is a 170' long span Parker Through Truss Bridge with 50' long rolled steel girders supporting multiple approach spans. The bridge was constructed in 1937 to replace an earlier bridge washed away in the Saint Patrick's Day Flood of 1936. The bridge was constructed by the Roanoke Iron and Bridge Works Company of VA (Bridge Builder - Superstructure), Gilbert Construction Company of Charleston (Bridge Builder - Substructure), and R.W. Moore of Staunton, VA (Approaches) with funding from the New Deal. The bridge was added to the National Register of Historic Places on September 8, 2025, for its significance in the areas of engineering and transportation. The bridge serves as the entry to the more rugged and rural western Morgan County over the mountain from Berkeley Springs.

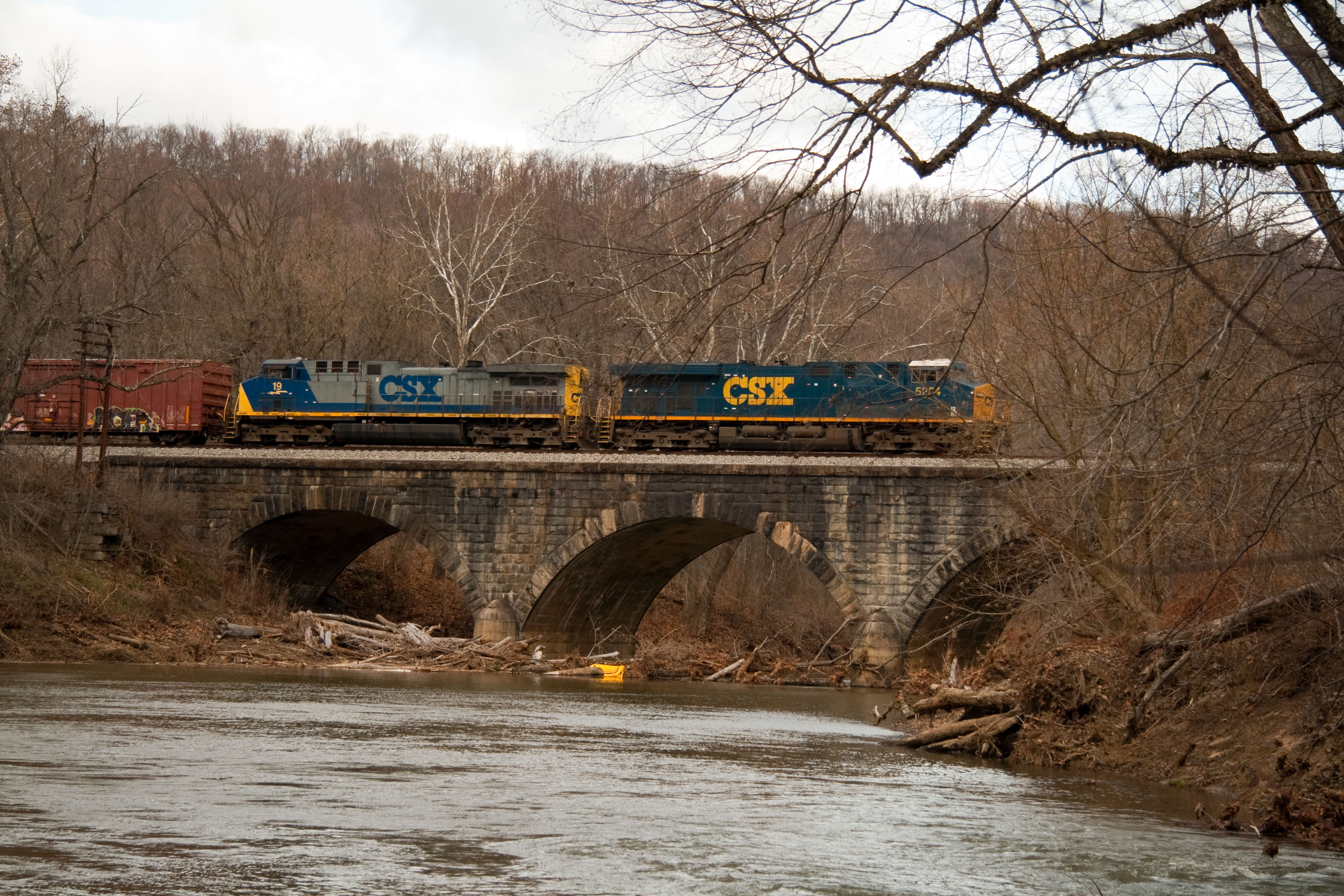
A CSX freight crosses the river at Great Cacapon
