= Spring Gap Mountain =

Mountain in the U.S. state of West Virginia

Highest point
- Elevation: 2,237 ft (682 m)
- Coordinates: 39°27′27″N 78°28′53″W

Geography
- Location: Hampshire / Morgan counties, West Virginia, U.S.
- Parent range: Ridge-and-Valley Appalachians or Allegheny Mountains
- Topo map(s): USGS Largent, Levels

Climbing
- Easiest route: Hike

Spring Gap Mountain runs southwest northeast through Morgan and Hampshire counties in West Virginia's Eastern Panhandle, rising to its greatest elevation of 2,237 ft (682 m) north of "Spring Gap", from which the mountain takes its name. The gap is the source for Dug Hill Run, a tributary stream of the Little Cacapon River.

Spring Gap Mountain is a mountain ridge with its southern point rising north of Slanesville between Noland Ridge 1,161 ft (354 m) and Sideling Hill. North of Spring Gap, the mountain reaches its highest peak and continues northeast with the Little Cacapon River meandering by Neals Run along its western flank. The northern end of Spring Gap Mountain is located south of West Virginia Route 9 southeast of Paw Paw.

During the French and Indian War (1754–1763), Major General Edward Braddock's march from Winchester, Virginia to Cumberland, Maryland took him and his men across Spring Gap Mountain. Braddock and his men camped atop Spring Gap Mountain because of the abundance of fresh drinking water at the mountain's "Spring Gap." From the mountain, Braddock and his men traveled downhill to the Little Cacapon River, which they followed to Fort Cox on the Potomac River.
