= Neals Run, West Virginia =

- Unincorporated community
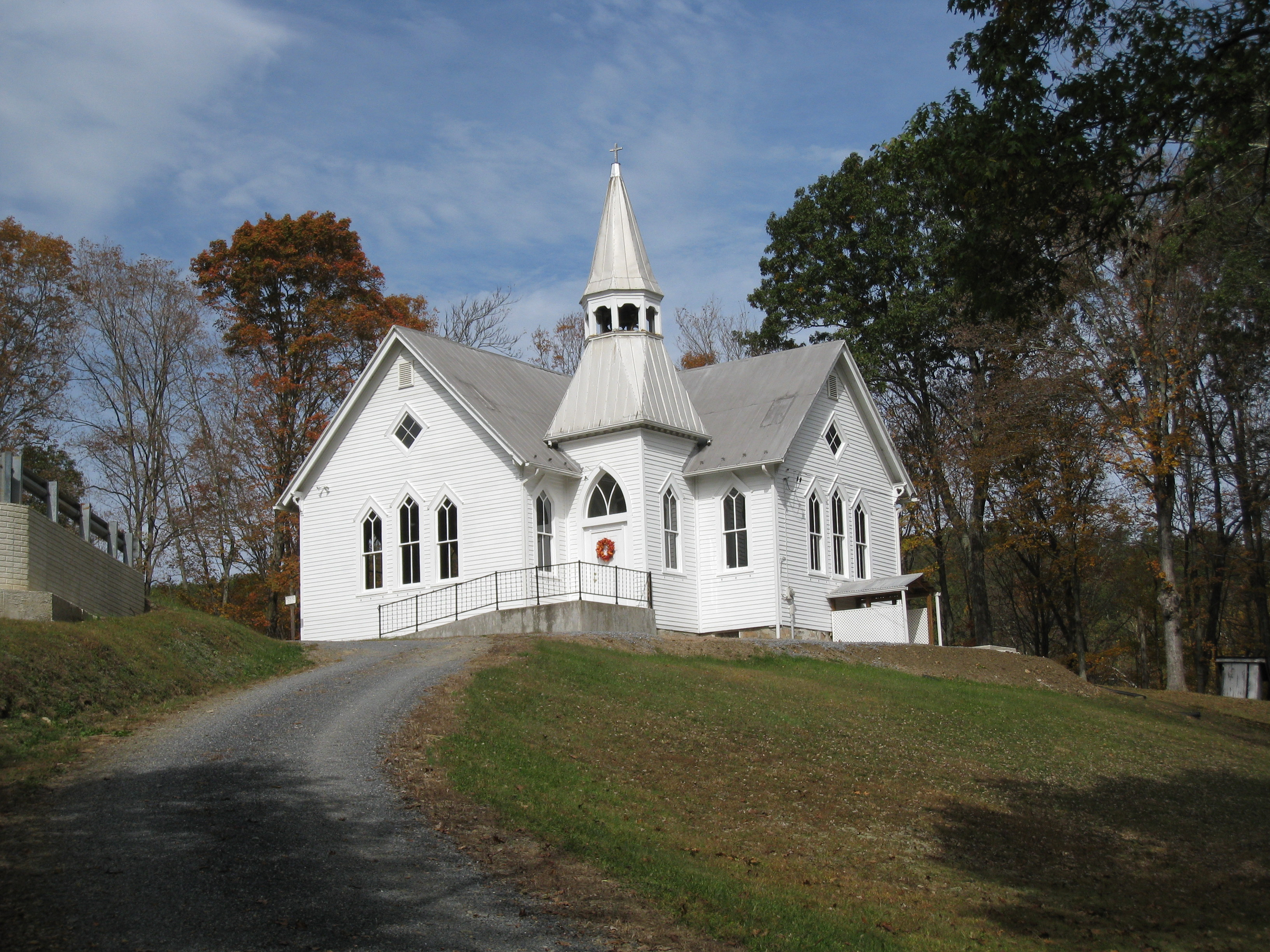
- Bethel United Methodist Church

- Location within West Virginia Location within the United States
- Coordinates: 39°29′54″N 78°29′43″W
- Country: United States
- State: West Virginia
- County: Hampshire
- Time zone: UTC-5 (Eastern (EST))
  - Summer (DST): UTC-4 (EDT)
- GNIS feature ID: 1555193

Neals Run is an unincorporated community in Hampshire County in the U.S. state of West Virginia. Neals Run is located south of Little Cacapon near the confluence of the Little Cacapon River and Neals Run on Spring Gap-Neals Run Road (West Virginia Secondary Route 2). The community derives its name from the stream.

Neals Run was originally known as Cacapehon until April 15, 1925, when the local post office's name changed to Neals Run. Cacapehon is an antiquated spelling of "Cacapon" and the community was named so for its proximity to the Little Cacapon River. Today, the residents refer to the community as Neals Run, while most topographic or road maps frequently use Cacapehon.

== Historic sites ==
- Bethel United Methodist Church & Cemetery, Baptist Church Road (WV Secondary Route 2/5)
- Old Neals Run Post Office, Spring Gap-Neals Run Road (WV Secondary Route 2)
