= Yellow Spring, West Virginia =

- Unincorporated community
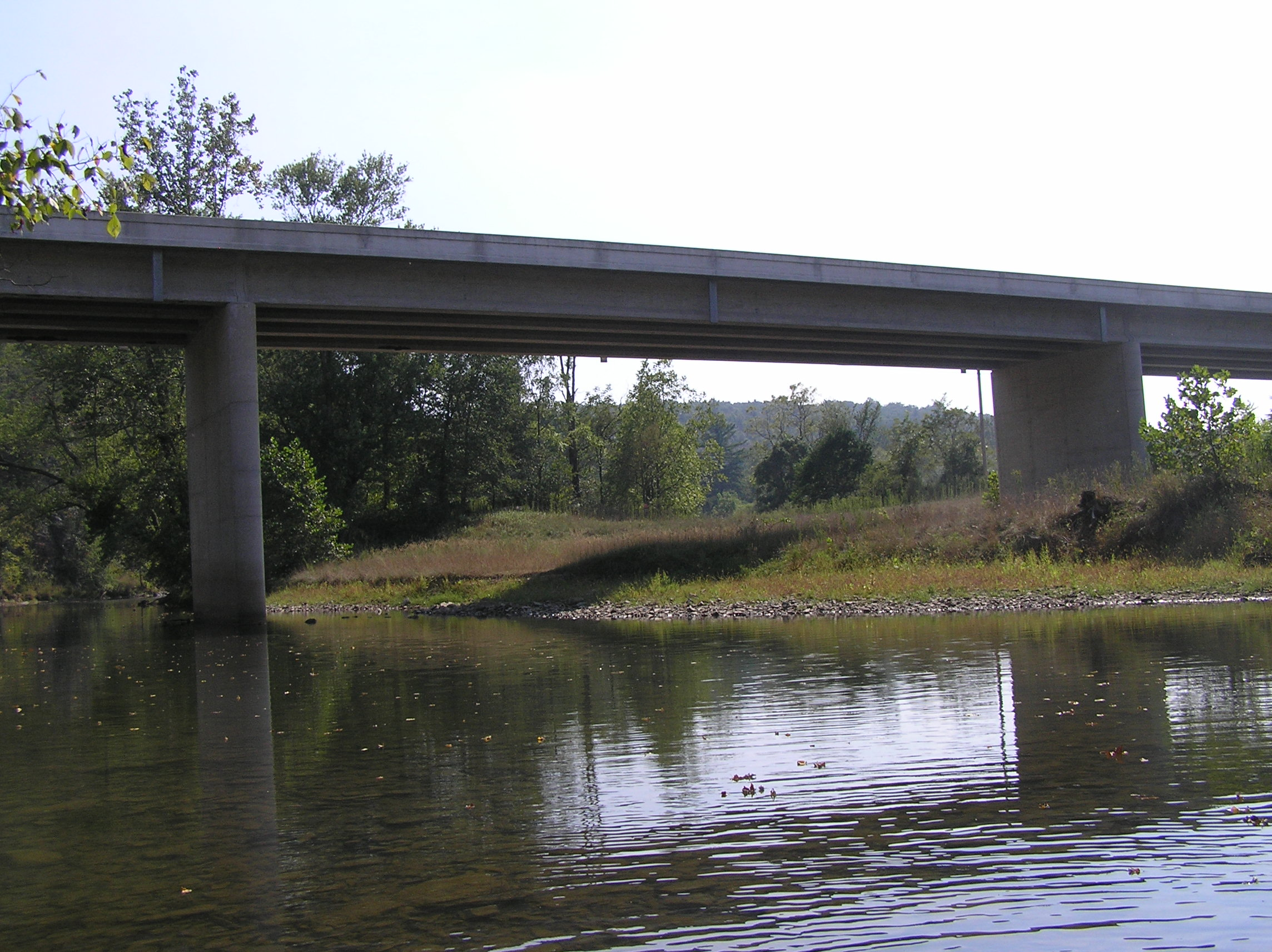
- Kenneth Seldon Bridge on the Cacapon River at Yellow Spring

- Location within West Virginia Location within the United States
- Coordinates: 39°10′56″N 78°30′34″W
- Country: United States
- State: West Virginia
- County: Hampshire
- Elevation: 896 ft (273 m)
- Time zone: UTC-5 (Eastern (EST))
  - Summer (DST): UTC-4 (EDT)
- ZIP code: 26865
- Area code: 304
- GNIS feature ID: 1556037

Yellow Spring is an unincorporated community in Hampshire County in the U.S. state of West Virginia. According to the 2000 census, the Yellow Spring community has a population of 296. Yellow Spring is named after the "Yellow Spring" located there on the Cacapon River. The community lies at the junction of West Virginia Route 259 and Cacapon River Road (West Virginia Secondary Route 14). Yellow Spring is sometimes incorrectly listed or referred to as Yellowspring or Yellow Springs.

== Historic sites ==
- Asa Cline House , WV Route 259
- Yellow Spring Mill (c. 1896–1898), WV Route 259
