= Jericho, West Virginia =

- Unincorporated community
- Location within West Virginia Location within the United States
- Coordinates: 39°12′42″N 78°25′29″W
- Country: United States
- State: West Virginia
- County: Hampshire
- Time zone: UTC-5 (Eastern (EST))
  - Summer (DST): UTC-4 (EDT)
- GNIS feature ID: 1718658

Jericho is an unincorporated community in Hampshire County in the U.S. state of West Virginia on the Virginia line. It is located on West Virginia Route 259 between High View and Lehew atop Timber Ridge.
