= Concord, Hampshire County, West Virginia =

Unincorporated community in West Virginia, United States

Concord, West Virginia
- Unincorporated community
- Location within Eastern Panhandle of West Virginia Location within West Virginia Location within the United States
- Coordinates: 39°11′42″N 78°27′52″W
- Country: United States
- State: West Virginia
- County: Hampshire
- Time zone: UTC-5 (Eastern (EST))
  - Summer (DST): UTC-4 (EDT)

Concord is an unincorporated community and former post office in southeastern Hampshire County in the U.S. state of West Virginia. It is located along Eldridge Road (County Route 23/2) between the unincorporated communities of Lehew and Yellow Spring.

== Geography and setting ==
Concord is centered along Eldridge Road (County Route 23/2) in southeastern Hampshire County, West Virginia. It is situated approximately 1.5 miles (2.4 km) west-southwest of Lehew and approximately 2.5 miles (4.0 km) east-northeast of Yellow Spring. A 1933 map of Hampshire County placed Concord at the location of the former L Ridge School. Cacapon Mountain and the Cacapon River valley are positioned approximately 2 miles (3.2 km) west of Concord, and Timber Ridge is located approximately 1.4 miles (2.3 km) to the community's east.

== History ==
The land upon which Concord is located was originally part of the Northern Neck Proprietary, a land grant that the exiled Charles II awarded to seven of his supporters in 1649 during the English Interregnum. Following the Restoration in 1660, Charles II finally ascended to the English throne. Charles II renewed the Northern Neck Proprietary grant in 1662, revised it in 1669, and again renewed the original grant favoring original grantee Thomas Colepeper, 2nd Baron Colepeper and Henry Bennet, 1st Earl of Arlington in 1672. In 1681, Bennet sold his share to Lord Colepeper, and Lord Colepeper received a new charter for the entire land grant from James II in 1688. Following the deaths of Lord Colepeper, his wife Margaret, and his daughter Katherine, the Northern Neck Proprietary passed to Katherine's son Thomas Fairfax, 6th Lord Fairfax of Cameron in 1719.

Under Lord Fairfax's ownership, the Cacapon River Valley was predominantly inhabited by English-speaking settlers as early as the late 1730s; most came from Pennsylvania and New Jersey. As settlement progressed during the second half of the 18th century, the fertile land of Hampshire County (including the Cacapon River valley) also attracted German settlers from Pennsylvania and elsewhere in Virginia before and after the American Revolutionary War (1775–1783).

James Kelso, an immigrant from County Donegal, Ireland, purchased 779 acres (315 ha) along Loman Branch near Concord in the 1804, and his landholdings eventually grew to approximately 2,000 acres (810 ha).

The Concord Meeting House, once located in the vicinity of present-day Concord, was mentioned by early 19th-century Christian Reverend Christy Sine in his journal dating from the 1820s. A church known as the Concord Presbyterian Church also formerly operated in Concord.

The United States Post Office Department established a post office at Concord on March 8, 1876. In July 1918, the department created a 12-mile (19 km) star route, which connected Concord to Gore, Virginia, on the Northwestern Turnpike, by way of Lehew and High View. This postal route ran from Concord to Gore and back six times per week, and became operational on August 1, 1918. Concord's post office remained in operation until March 15, 1933. Following its closure, Concord's mail was routed to the Lehew post office.

Throughout its operation, Concord's post office had seven postmasters, including five grandchildren of settler James Kelso: Ida Cordelia Kelso, John Newton Kelso, Carter Gilbert Kelso, Laura Ellen Kelso, and Olive Willetta Kelso.

| Postmaster | Appointment |
|---|---|
| Ida Cordelia Kelso | March 8, 1876 |
| John Newton Kelso | May 13, 1887 |
| Carter Gilbert Kelso | February 29, 1888 |
| Laura Ellen Kelso | March 20, 1891 |
| Olive Willetta Kelso | May 3, 1895 |
| T. M. Spaid | June 13, 1899 |
| Lydia A. Spaid | January 7, 1904 |

In 2000, the Christian-oriented Concord Retreat Center camp and retreat opened in Concord. Its grounds include the old Concord post office and general store.

== Notable person ==
- Arthur R. M. Spaid, American educator and writer

== Bibliography ==
- Brannon, Selden W., ed. (1976). Historic Hampshire: A Symposium of Hampshire County and Its People, Past and Present. Parsons, West Virginia: McClain Printing Company. ISBN 978-0-87012-236-1. OCLC 3121468.
- Coleman, Roy V. (1951). Liberty and Property. New York City: Scribner. OCLC 1020487 – via Internet Archive.
- Harloe, Charles Bruce, ed. (1943). Harloe–Kelso Genealogy of the Descendants of John William Harloe and James Kelso, From the Beginning of Their Lineages in This Country to the Present Time, With a Number of Allied Families and Many Historical Facts. Winchester, Virginia: Dr. Charles Bruce Harloe; Pifer Printing Company. OCLC 192102027 – via Internet Archive.
- McMaster, Len (January 2010). "Hampshire County West Virginia Post Offices, Part 1" (PDF). La Posta: The Journal of American Postal History. Vol. 40, no. 1. La Posta Publications. pp. 37–46. Archived from the original (PDF) on February 23, 2019.
- Munske, Roberta R.; Kerns, Wilmer L., eds. (2004). Hampshire County, West Virginia, 1754–2004. Romney, West Virginia: The Hampshire County 250th Anniversary Committee. ISBN 978-0-9715738-2-6. OCLC 55983178.
- Rice, Otis K. (2015). The Allegheny Frontier: West Virginia Beginnings, 1730–1830. Lexington, Kentucky: University Press of Kentucky. ISBN 978-0-8131-6438-0. OCLC 900345296. Archived from the original on May 27, 2016 – via Google Books.
- Rose, Cornelia Bruère (1976). Arlington County, Virginia: A History. Arlington County, Virginia: Arlington Historical Society. OCLC 2401541. Archived from the original on April 2, 2016 – via Google Books.
- Scaffidi, Sandra (July 28, 2014). National Register of Historic Places Registration Form: Hebron Church (PDF). United States Department of the Interior, National Park Service. Archived from the original (PDF) on October 5, 2015.
- Thomas, Allen C., ed. (1900). Biographical Catalogue of the Matriculates of Haverford College Together with Lists of the Members of the College Faculty and the Managers, Officers and Recipients of Honorary Degrees, 1833–1900. Philadelphia: Haverford College Alumni Association, Sherman and Company. OCLC 551359046 – via Internet Archive.
- William and Mary Quarterly (April 1898). "The Northern Neck of Virginia". William and Mary Quarterly. 6 (4): 222–226. ISSN 0043-5597. JSTOR 1915885. OCLC 1607858.
