= Nathaniel Mountain =

Mountain in United States of America

Highest point
- Elevation: 2,739 ft (835 m)
- Coordinates: 39°12′33″N 78°47′41″W

Geography
- Location: Hampshire County, West Virginia, U.S.
- Parent range: Ridge-and-Valley Appalachians
- Topo map(s): USGS Sector and Romney

Climbing
- Easiest route: Hike

Nathaniel Mountain is a mountain ridge that runs southwest northeast through Hampshire County in West Virginia's Eastern Panhandle, rising to its greatest elevation of 2,739 feet (835 m) above sea-level. The mountain is bound at its western flank by the South Branch Potomac River and to its eastern flank by South Branch Mountain 3,028 feet (923 m). The bulk of Nathaniel Mountain is located within the Nathaniel Mountain Wildlife Management Area (WMA) owned by the West Virginia Division of Natural Resources.

The rugged topography of Nathaniel Mountain and its WMA is dominated by mature oak and hickory forests with Virginia pine. The mountain also supports a habitat for a variety of neo-tropical migratory birds and two wetlands identified by The Nature Conservancy. Nathaniel Mountain's forested wetlands are a unique find at such a high elevation. The wetlands include a number of plant species not common in the region, including sphagnum moss (Sphagnum andersonianum) and the cinnamon fern (Osmunda cinnamomea). White-tailed deer, wild turkeys, squirrels, black bears, and grouse may be pursued by hunters on the mountain. Nathaniel Mountain's Mill Run serves as a habitat for rainbow trout and native brook trout.
