= Mill Run (South Branch Potomac River tributary) =

Tributary stream of the South Branch Potomac River in West Virginia

Coordinates: 39°18′08″N 78°48′05″W

Mill Run is a 9.1-mile-long (14.6 km) tributary stream of the South Branch Potomac River, belonging to the Potomac River and Chesapeake Bay watersheds. The stream is located in Hampshire County in the Eastern Panhandle of the U.S. state of West Virginia. Mill Run rises on Nathaniel Mountain and flows northeast, then northwest into the South Branch south of Romney near Hampshire Park on South Branch River Road (West Virginia Secondary Route 8).

== Headwaters and course ==
Mill Run's headwaters lie in a hollow between South Branch Mountain (3028 feet) and Nathaniel Mountain (2739 feet) in the Nathaniel Mountain Wildlife Management Area. The stream runs northeast, then northwest, where it is met with a number of trails and old lumbering roads used by fishermen and hunters that utilize the WMA. Two small unnamed streams also born from hollows in Nathaniel Mountain join Mill Run as it flows toward Peterkin Conference Center. After passing through Peterkin, Mill Run adjoins Hampshire Park and its 4-H camp facilities such as its council circle and makes its way past the old Pancake Schoolhouse. Mill Run then flows under South Branch River Road and empties into the South Branch near Riverview Farm.

== Bridges ==
Bridge	Route	Location
Advent Lodge Wooden Bridge	Walkway at Peterkin Conference Center	Romney
Mill Run Bridge	South Branch River Road (CR 8)	Romney

== See also ==
- List of West Virginia rivers
