= James Caudy =

American frontiersman, and landowner (1707-1784)

- Born: 1707; Spanish Netherlands
- Died: March 15 1784 (aged 76–77) near present-day Capon Bridge, West Virginia, United States
- Burial place: Hartford Bealer farm Christian Church Road; Capon Bridge, West Virginia, United States; 39°17.167′N 078°26.218′W
- Spouse(s): Mary Hutchinson; Mrs. James McCoy
- Relatives: Children: David Caudy; Ann Caudy Dulany; Margaret Caudy Wood; Mary Caudy Kinman; Sarah Caudy Hancher
- Military career
- Branch: Michael Cresap's militia
- Conflicts: French and Indian War
- Other work: frontiersman, settler, and landowner

James Caudy (1707 – March 15, 1784) was an American frontiersman, settler, and landowner in the Ridge-and-Valley Appalachians of the Colony of Virginia—present-day West Virginia. Caudy was born in the Netherlands, immigrated to the Thirteen Colonies in the 1730s, and settled within the Cacapon River valley near present-day Capon Bridge in Hampshire County. As early as 1741, Caudy was associated with the arrangement and development of transportation routes throughout present-day Hampshire County. Caudy twice hosted George Washington; first during his surveying expedition in 1748 and again upon Washington's 1750 return to the Cacapon River valley.

Caudy participated in the French and Indian War and is best known for having purportedly defended himself from a band of Native American fighters on Caudy's Castle—a sandstone outcrop that now bears his name. According to tradition, Caudy used his long rifle barrel to push his Native American attackers off the rock into the Cacapon River below. In his later life, Caudy became involved in a land dispute with John Capper that was resolved by Thomas Fairfax, 6th Lord Fairfax of Cameron in November 1762. Caudy died in 1784 and was interred on his property south of present-day Capon Bridge. According to local tradition, Caudy was buried with a Native American on either side of him, while another tradition says Caudy was buried with his horse.

== Early life ==
James Caudy was born in 1707 in the Spanish Netherlands. He possibly arrived in the Thirteen Colonies through Prince George's County in the Province of Maryland in the 1730s. While in Prince George's County, Caudy married his first wife, Mary Hutchinson.

== Settlement in Virginia ==
Around 1738, Caudy and fellow frontiersman Joseph Edwards purchased tracts of land along the Cacapon River. He and Edwards were accompanied by the first two families of European descent to settle in the Cacapon River valley. Caudy and his family settled on 358 acres (145 ha; 0.559 sq mi) in the Cacapon River valley near present-day Capon Bridge in what was then Orange County. (Note: This part of Orange County later became part of Frederick County following its creation in 1743, then Hampshire County following its creation from Frederick in 1754.) Caudy's land parcel was located to the south of Edwards's 400 acres (160 ha; 0.63 sq mi); the present-day U.S. Route 50 (Northwestern Turnpike) approximately corresponds to the boundary between Caudy's and Edwards's land parcels.

== Development of transportation routes ==
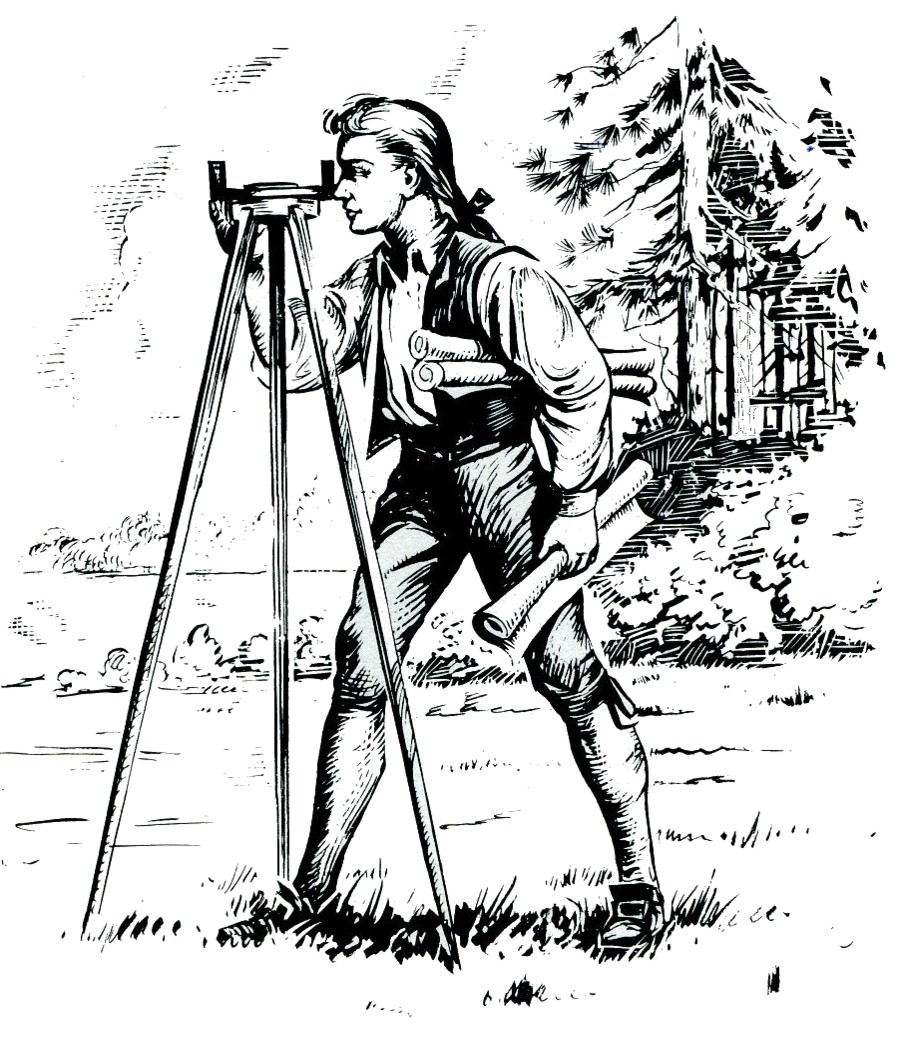
George Washington (pictured) stayed overnight at Caudy's cabin during a surveying expedition in 1748, and surveyed land for Caudy when he returned to the Cacapon River valley in 1750.

As early as 1741, Caudy was associated with the arrangement and development of transportation routes throughout present-day Hampshire County. On March 25, 1742, an Orange County court order mandated that Jeremiah Smith and James Eaton "view and lay" a road from Caudy's land to Isaac Perkins's mill near Winchester. That year, a wagon road was constructed between Winchester and Caudy's land tract. By 1744, this route was extended from Caudy's property to the North River at present-day North River Mills. This route later terminated at the mouth of Patterson Creek on the North Branch Potomac River and connected Winchester with Cumberland, Maryland.

In December 1742, the County Court of Orange County ordered the construction of another wagon road from Caudy's land to the South Branch Potomac River. In 1743, a wagon road connecting Winchester and Moorefield traversed Caudy's land using a ford in the Cacapon River. This road led to a watermill near Old Fields on the South Branch Potomac River. Due to the location of Caudy's settlement along the Winchester–Moorefield route, his residence served as an overnight stopping point for George Washington and George William Fairfax in April 1748. Washington and Fairfax were returning to Winchester en route to Belvoir following their surveying expedition in the South Branch Potomac River valley in present-day Hardy County. Washington and his surveying party stayed overnight in Caudy's log cabin. On April 12, 1750, George Washington surveyed a plot of "waste land" for Caudy, using white oak trees as boundary markers.

Caudy and John Stewart of Frederick County coordinated the layout and construction of further transportation routes through the region, and were respected for their efforts. Following Stewart's death in 1750, Stewart left his eldest son in the charge of Caudy and Captain Jeremiah Smith, who both procured land along the Cacapon River for him.

== French and Indian War ==
=== Caudy's Castle incident ===
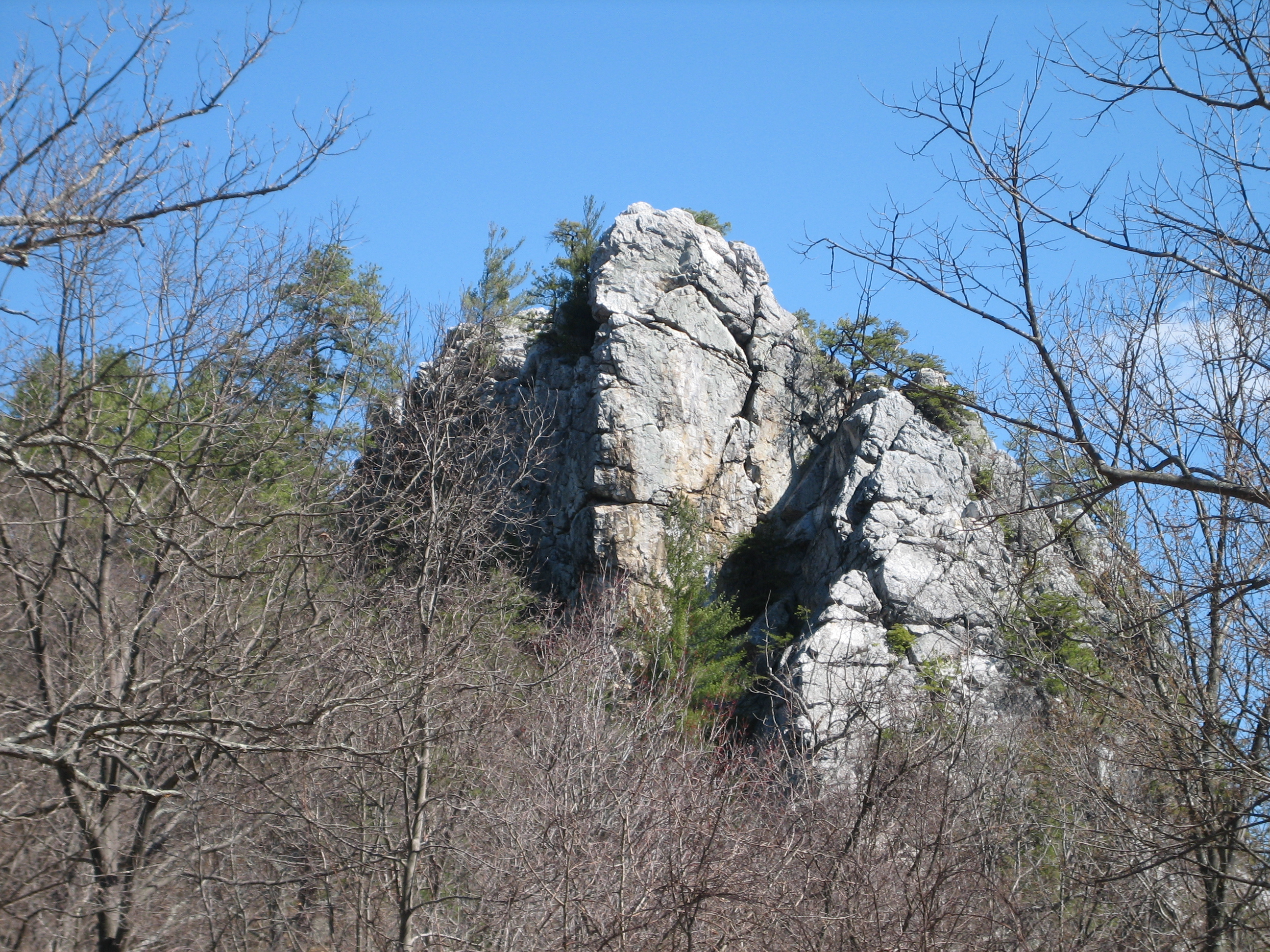
James Caudy single-handedly fended off Native American fighters within the craggy recesses of a rock formation (pictured), pushing them into the Cacapon River below. This formation was later known as Caudy's Castle.

According to local tradition and folklore, Caudy is known as an "Indian fighter". Upon detecting a Native American stalker in pursuit of him, Caudy pretended to flee along a pathway leading up the mountain toward the craggy bluffs spanning between 450 and 600 feet (140 and 180 m) above the Cacapon River, south of present-day Forks of Cacapon. This pathway edged around the face of a rock formation overlooking the Cacapon River, and narrowed into a rocky ledge. Another legend says Caudy was leading a group of pioneer settlers in defense against Native American attacks.

In both versions of the story, Caudy awaited his pursuers within the craggy recesses of the rock formation. The narrow recesses within the pinnacle's sandstone ledges allowed only single file passage through the rock outcrop toward the formation's face. As Caudy's followers traversed the outcrop's narrow passes and ledges, Caudy is said to have used his long rifle barrel to push them one-by-one off the rock formation into the Cacapon River 450 to 600 feet (140 to 180 m) below. (Note: The West Virginia state historical highway marker for "Caudy's Castle" states that Caudy used "the butt of his rifle" rather than the rifle barrel.) Other legends say Caudy used the tactic atop this rock on several occasions. The outcrop was named "Caudy's Castle," by which it is still known. With the exception of this event, there exist no other accounts of encounters or conflicts between Caudy and Native Americans.

=== French and Indian War service ===
During the French and Indian War, Caudy remained on his property on the Cacapon River; he staunchly defended it and likely sought further protection at Fort Edwards to the north. Caudy's residence may have been fortified; it was known as "Coddy's Fort". This fortification was not part of the "chain of forts" organized by George Washington for the defense of settlers against Native American raids in the South Branch Potomac and Cacapon River valleys. Caudy also served as a drummer in Maryland frontiersman Michael Cresap's militia.

Caudy hosted Washington again in 1755, providing Washington with an ample supply of grass seed that was likely produced in one of Caudy's fertile fields known as "Caudy's Meadow". Civil engineer Claudius Crozet later mentioned Caudy's Meadow in his fieldnotes during the planning and construction of the Northwestern Turnpike nearby. Washington sent payment for the grass seed to Caudy through James Wood, the founder of Winchester, Virginia.

== Later life and death ==
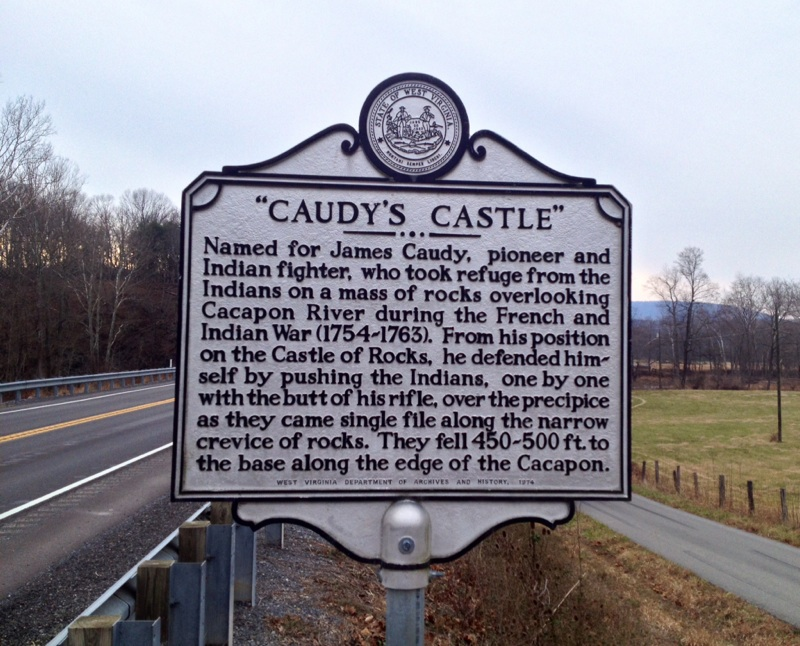
A West Virginia state highway historical marker commemorating Caudy's defense from Native American attack at Caudy's Castle. The marker is located along West Virginia Route 127 near Forks of Cacapon.

Following his marriage to the widow of James McCoy by 1761, Caudy intended to acquire McCoy's 369 acres (149 ha; 0.577 sq mi) east of Great North Mountain in Frederick County. Caudy's claim to McCoy's land was disputed by John Capper, who claimed to have purchased McCoy's property before his death. A feud developed between Caudy and Capper; it was resolved by Thomas Fairfax, 6th Lord Fairfax of Cameron in November 1762. Lord Fairfax awarded 165 acres (67 ha; 0.258 sq mi) to Caudy and the remainder of the disputed land to Capper.

Caudy never learned to write in English; he signed his last will and testament with an X mark in 1784. Caudy died on March 15, 1784, and was interred on his property south of present-day Capon Bridge. According to local tradition, Caudy was buried with a Native American on either side of him. Another tradition says he was buried with his horse. The site of Caudy's interment is located on property now known as Hartford Bealer farm. In the 1930s, Caudy's burial site was attended to by a local Boy Scouts troop, who landscaped the site and planted shrubbery. By 1976, Caudy's burial place was marked with four posts. In 2002, the Capon Bridge Ruritan Club removed the overgrown shrubs and erected a white fence around Caudy's interment site. The project was initiated by Capon Bridge area residents Roy Giffin, Ken Edmonds, and Roberta Munske. The Ruritans purchased a marble marker and erected it on the site at 9 a.m. on November 15, 2003. The burial site is accessible and visible from Christian Church Road, West Virginia Secondary Route 13.

== Marriages and issue ==
Caudy's first marriage was to Mary Hutchinson in Prince George's County, Maryland. He and Mary had five children together:

- David Caudy (died in November 1782), married Martha Hiett
- Ann Caudy Dulany, married a Mr. Dulany
- Margaret Caudy Wood, married Daniel Wood
- Mary Caudy Kinman, married Samuel Kinman
- Sarah Caudy Hancher, married John Hancher

By 1761, Caudy had married the widow of James McCoy, who lived across Great North Mountain in Frederick County.

== Bibliography ==
- Bockstruck, Lloyd DeWitt (1988). Virginia's Colonial Soldiers. Baltimore: Genealogical Publishing Company. ISBN 978-0-8063-1219-4. OCLC 18099826. Archived from the original on January 5, 2014 – via Google Books.
- Brannon, Selden W., ed. (1976). Historic Hampshire: A Symposium of Hampshire County and Its People, Past and Present. Parsons, West Virginia: McClain Printing Company. ISBN 978-0-87012-236-1. OCLC 3121468.
- Kercheval, Samuel (1902). Charles James Faulkner; John Jeremiah Jacob (eds.). A History of the Valley of Virginia. Woodstock, Virginia: W. N. Grabill. OCLC 11240552. Archived from the original on April 10, 2016 – via Google Books.
- Kerns, Wilmer L. (1995). Frederick County, Virginia: Settlement and Some First Families of Back Creek Valley, 1730–1830. Baltimore: Gateway Press, Incorporated. OCLC 32652014. Archived from the original on January 5, 2014 – via Google Books.
- Miller, Ann B.; Virginia Transportation Research Council (2003). Final Report: Identification and Application of Criteria for Determining National Register Eligibility of Roads in Virginia (PDF). Commonwealth of Virginia. Archived from the original (PDF) on September 26, 2012.
- Munske, Roberta R.; Kerns, Wilmer L., eds. (2004). Hampshire County, West Virginia, 1754–2004. Romney, West Virginia: The Hampshire County 250th Anniversary Committee. ISBN 978-0-9715738-2-6. OCLC 55983178.
- Pugh, Maud (2009). Capon Valley: Its Pioneers and Their Descendants, 1698 to 1940. Baltimore: Genealogical Publishing Company. ISBN 978-0-8063-4551-2. OCLC 34204531. Archived from the original on January 5, 2014 – via Google Books.
- Washington, George (1892). Joseph Meredith Toner (ed.). Journal of My Journey Over the Mountains. Albany, New York: J. Munsell's Sons. OCLC 1817496. Archived from the original on January 8, 2014 – via Google Books.
- Wirtz, W. Willard (1990). Capon Valley Sampler: Sketches of Appalachia from George Washington to Caudy Davis. Silver Spring, Maryland: Bartleby Press. ISBN 978-0-910155-14-4. OCLC 20634834.
