= Schaffenaker Mountain =

Mountain in the U.S. state of West Virginia

Highest point
- Elevation: 1,488 ft (454 m)
- Coordinates: 39°16′37″N 78°28′21″W

Geography
- Location: Hampshire County, West Virginia, U.S.
- Parent range: Ridge-and-Valley Appalachians
- Topo map: USGS Capon Bridge

Climbing
- Easiest route: Hike, drive

Schaffenaker Mountain is a forested mountain ridge of the Ridge-and-valley Appalachians in Hampshire County in the U.S. state of West Virginia. The ridge runs southwest northeast between Edwards Run (and its surrounding Parks Valley) and Dillons Run. Schaffenaker Mountain takes its name from the Schaffenaker family that settled in the immediate area. The Northwestern Turnpike (U.S. Route 50) climbs Schaffenaker Mountain to the west of the town of Capon Bridge offering a bird's eye view of the community and of the Cacapon River. Until recently, the mountain had remained mostly undeveloped but its views and proximity to Capon Bridge have made it a prime location for real estate development by companies such as the North American Land Corporation.
