= Nero, West Virginia =

- Unincorporated community
- Location within West Virginia Location within the United States
- Coordinates: 39°10′32″N 78°26′19″W
- Country: United States
- State: West Virginia
- County: Hampshire
- Time zone: UTC-5 (Eastern (EST))
  - Summer (DST): UTC-4 (EDT)
- GNIS feature ID: 1718680

Nero was an unincorporated community in Hampshire County, West Virginia, United States. It is located on Back Creek Road (West Virginia Secondary Route 23/3) south of Lehew. Nero lies along Loman Branch, a tributary stream of the Cacapon River. Nero no longer has its own post office in operation.
