= Arthur R. M. Spaid =

American educator, school administrator, lecturer, and writer

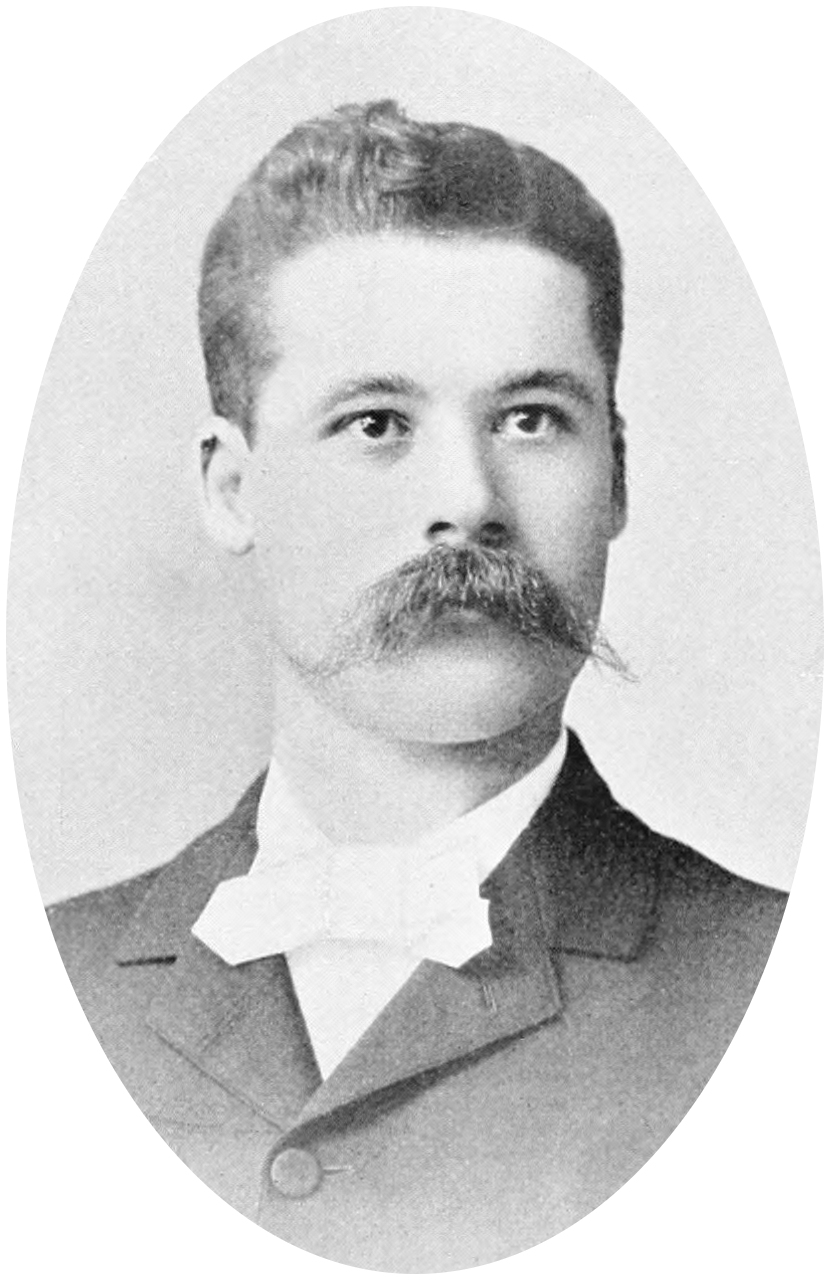
- Portrait of Spaid from History of Hampshire County, West Virginia (1897)

Delaware State Commissioner of Education
- In office July 1, 1917 – July 1, 1921

Superintendent of Dorchester County Public Schools
- In office 1913–1917

Superintendent of New Castle County Public Schools
- In office 1903–1913

Principal of Alexis I. duPont High School
- In office 1894–1903

Personal details
- Born: July 27, 1866 Capon Springs, West Virginia, United States
- Died: March 16, 1936 (aged 69) Winchester, Virginia, United States
- Spouse: Mary Abi Farquhar Spaid
- Relations: John W. Spaid (father); Margaret Elizabeth Brill Spaid (mother)
- Education: Wilmington College (AB); Haverford College (MA); Columbia University (MA)
- Profession: educator, school administrator, superintendent, and education commissioner

Arthur Rusmiselle Miller Spaid (July 27, 1866 – March 16, 1936) was an American educator, school administrator, lecturer, and writer. He served as principal of Alexis I. duPont High School (1894–1903) in Wilmington, Delaware, superintendent of New Castle County Public Schools (1903–1913) in Delaware, superintendent of Dorchester County Public Schools (1913–1917) in Maryland, and Delaware State commissioner of Education (1917–1921).

Born in West Virginia, Spaid began his career in education as a schoolteacher in Virginia and as a school administrator in Ohio. After a decade as a principal Spaid became a superintendent; in this role he argued for compulsory education and the consolidation of New Castle County's rural public schools, instituted pay raises for teachers to mitigate a teacher shortage, and served on a committee to revise the state public school system's curriculum.

Spaid received a Master of Arts degree in education from Columbia University in 1917, the same year he became the Delaware State Commissioner of Education. As commissioner, Spaid worked to bring efficiency to the state's public school system; his efforts resulted in the Delaware State Board of Education's adoption of a new school code in 1919. He left Delaware in 1921 and engaged in Chautauqua-related work before becoming the head of the Education Department at Salem University in Salem, West Virginia, from 1926 to 1936.

Spaid was a naturalist by hobby and took hundreds of photographs, using them to illustrate his nature study articles and lecture slides. Throughout his career as a school administrator, he served as an instructor, lecturer, and speaker for multiple courses, institutes, and organizations. Spaid was also an avid writer, and he published articles in Scientific American and Country Life in America. He had planned to author a book on his nature studies, for which he had written notes and collected specimens; however, his home and notebooks were destroyed in a fire in 1917. Spaid died at the home of his daughter in Winchester, Virginia, in 1936. According to historians Hu Maxwell and Howard Llewellyn Swisher, Spaid "placed himself in the front rank of the educational works of Delaware, and received the commendation of the press and the educators for his advanced ideas."

== Early life and education ==
Arthur Rusmiselle Miller Spaid was born on July 27, 1866 in Capon Springs, West Virginia, to John W. Spaid and his wife, Margaret Elizabeth Brill Spaid. Arthur Spaid was the eldest of six children, with two brothers and three sisters: Luther Lore "Boyd" Spaid (1868–1877), Elia May Spaid (1870–1911), Martha Evalona Spaid (1875–1921), William Pohe Spaid (1878–1885), and Eleanor "Nellie" Love Spaid (1881–1963). His great-great-grandfather, George Nicholas Spaid (né Spaht), originated from Kassel, Germany, and settled in Hampshire County along the Cacapon River in the late 18th century. Arthur Spaid and his siblings were raised by their parents on a small farm on Timber Ridge. His father was a shoemaker who was interested in literature and recorded local history in notebooks.

Spaid received his primary and secondary education in the public schools of Hampshire County and worked on his family's farm until the age of 20. He completed his primary education in 1886 and earned his teaching certificate shortly thereafter. In the spring of 1886, he attended Professor Taylor's private school in Lacey Spring, Virginia, for three months and won prizes in spelling and history while there. Throughout his early education, Spaid was active in "scholastic athletics," including corner ball, baseball, running, and jumping. In the summer of 1886, Spaid briefly attended Professor Borglebaugh's normal school in nearby Broadway, Virginia. He completed his teacher's examination shortly thereafter and earned his teaching certificate.

== Career ==
=== Teaching and librarian ===
In 1886, Spaid began his first teaching position at the rural Loan Oak School in Broadway; he remained there until 1887. During his time in Broadway, he was a member of the Broadway Literary Society. Spaid visited Washington, Ohio, at his cousin's invitation. He entered Washington College and subsequently resigned from his teaching position in Virginia. To support himself during his first year in Washington, Spaid served as the college's assistant librarian and as the librarian of the town's Woman's Christian Temperance Union library. During this time he lived on two to three dollars per month, and was a bachelor. The following year, Spaid took on the role of the sexton of the Christian Church.

=== School administration ===
From 1889 to 1890, Spaid served as the principal of Twin Township High School in Bourneville, Ohio. From 1890 to 1891, he was principal of Bourneville's graded schools. While in Bourneville he economized by residing with village school teacher E. M. Parrett. Spaid reentered college in 1891, but following the illness and death of his brother-in-law Carter Gilbert Kelso, Spaid returned to Bourneville to teach his brother-in-law's class for the remainder of the term. After completing Kelso's term, Spaid returned to his studies, finished his course in 1893, and earned his Bachelor of Arts degree from Wilmington College in Wilmington, Ohio, where he was president of his class and participated in the Dorian Literary Society.

During his senior year at Wilmington College, Spaid was awarded the $500 Haverford Fellowship, which allowed him to pursue a year of post-graduate work at Haverford College in Haverford, Pennsylvania. He returned to Concord in Hampshire County, West Virginia, and then entered Haverford College in 1893. Spaid completed his graduate studies in American history and earned a Master of Arts degree from Haverford College in 1894.

Spaid relocated to Delaware in 1894 and was elected principal of Alexis I. duPont High School in Wilmington. According to historians Hu Maxwell and Howard Llewellyn Swisher, Spaid "placed himself in the front rank of the educational works of Delaware and received the commendation of the press and the educators for his advanced ideas." While serving as the high school's principal, he and his family resided in the Highlands neighborhood of Wilmington. In June 1897, at the end of the school year, the school's students presented Spaid with a traveling case. He served as the principal of Alexis I. duPont High School until 1903.

=== Superintendent of county public schools ===
Spaid was the Superintendent of New Castle County Public Schools from 1903 to 1913. During that time he resided in Brandywine. He was one of three county superintendents in Delaware; the other two administered the public schools in Kent and Sussex counties. Throughout his tenure, Spaid argued for compulsory education and the modernization and consolidation of the county's public schools. In November 1904, a special session of the Delaware State Board of Education appointed Spaid and the other two county superintendents to a committee charged with proposing and explaining legislation to improve and modernize the state's public school system to the Delaware Senate and Delaware House of Representatives. At a legislative conference on education in January 1905, Spaid and the other two county superintendents urged the consolidation of Delaware's rural schools to improve the education of students in the state's more isolated areas. Spaid declared at the conference that he would require greater influence if he were to be reappointed as superintendent. According to a local newspaper, he stated that "if the position of superintendent of free schools was not worth awarding on merit alone ... then he wanted to get out." He emphasized the necessity for graded consolidated schools in rural areas of New Castle County. Spaid noted that some of the county's rural schools had only one student in attendance for weeks at a time during the school year, and because of this the county's public schools were wasting money and the children in those affected areas were growing up in "ignorance". Spaid concluded that "compulsory education and consolidation of the schools was needed."

To keep the county's teacher positions fully staffed, Spaid instituted pay raises for some teachers in July 1906 so they would return for the fall term. In May 1908, the Delaware State Board of Education appointed Spaid and the county superintendents to a committee charged with revising the state public school system's curriculum.

While serving as New Castle County superintendent, Spaid's support of prohibition brought him into a public conflict with Wilmington's German American community. In 1907, Spaid received a letter from William J. Hogan who inquired about his position on prohibition. Spaid's response, the community held, made "insulting remarks" about the unreliability of immigrants who drank beer. The local German-American Alliance held a public meeting at a Turn Hall regarding Spaid's letter and addressed an open letter to him in which the alliance noted the academic achievements of Germans and the low literacy rates in prohibition states.

In 1913, Spaid was named superintendent of Dorchester County Public Schools in nearby Dorchester County, Maryland. While serving in this position, he received a Master of Arts degree in education from Columbia University in 1917. At Columbia, Spaid completed a course in school administration and supervision, and was a member of the university's Administration Club. In addition to his Master of Arts degree, Columbia also conferred upon Spaid the title of "Superintendent of Schools".

=== State Commissioner of Delaware Education ===
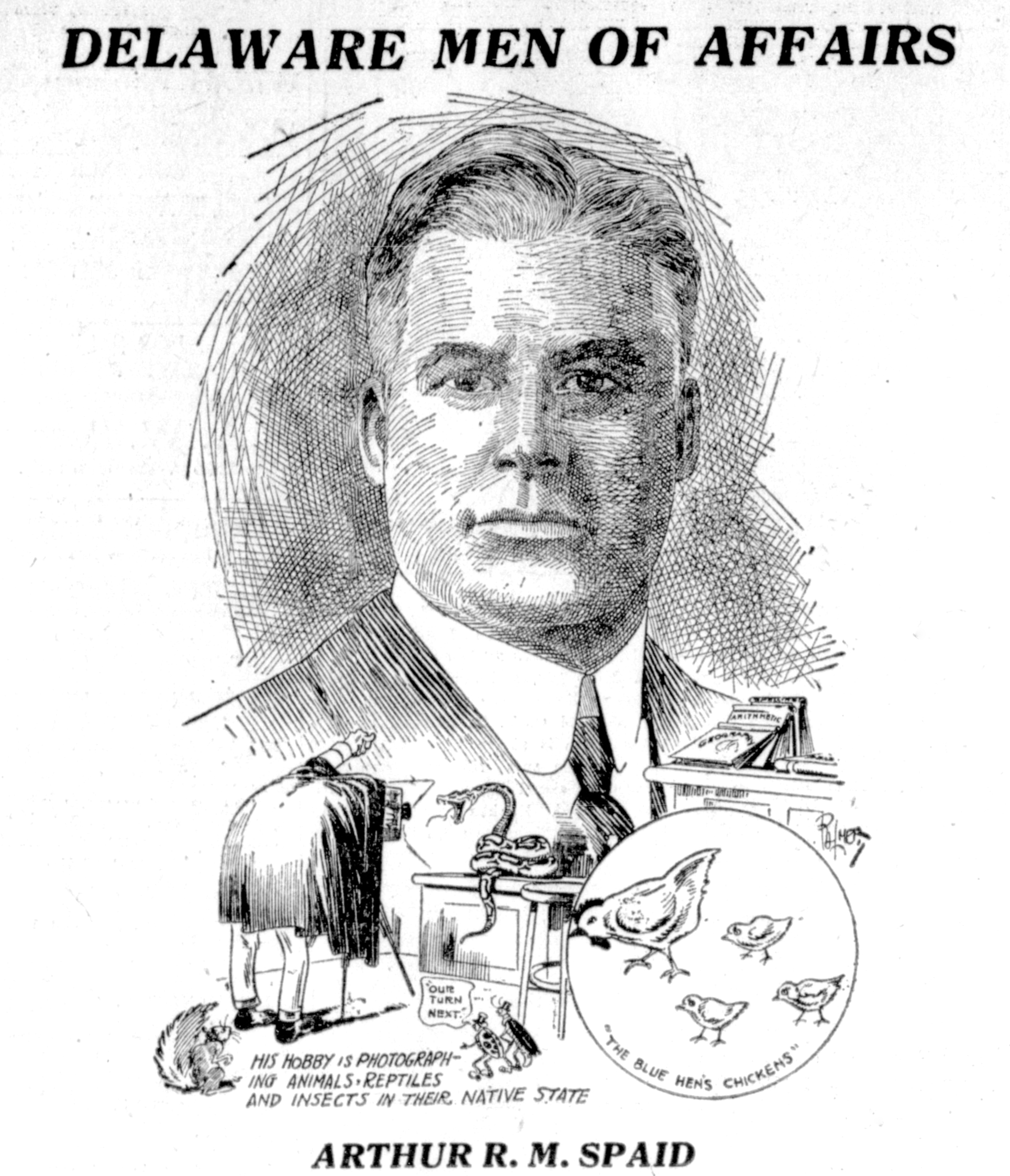
Sketch portrait of Spaid from The Evening Journal (1919).

From July 1, 1917 until July 1, 1921, Spaid served as the Delaware State Commissioner of Education, during which time he resided with his family at 241 North State Street in Dover. Philanthropist Pierre S. du Pont was secretary of the Delaware State Board of Education while Spaid served in this position.

In May 1918, Spaid held meetings of the Delaware State Board of Education at Stanton and locations across Delaware to hear from residents in school districts affected by the Delaware General Assembly's 1915 alteration of school district boundaries, to include consolidation of districts. As state commissioner, he convened a State Teachers' Institute in Newark in August 1918.

During his tenure as state commissioner, Delaware's public school system was impacted by World War I and the 1918 influenza pandemic. The pandemic caused Delaware's State Board of Health to shutter the state's public schools for three to four weeks. In November 1918, Spaid issued a four-page bulletin entitled, Our Children Must Be Educated, in which he appealed to parents and school administrators to address rising teacher resignations, school children withdrawals and other conditions affecting the state's public school system. In his bulletin, Spaid commended the work of Liberty bond campaigns and War Work drives. In addition, he stated, "This great world war is being fought to make democracy safe, but a democracy to be safe must be composed of intelligent citizens." He stressed that it was necessary to keep Delaware's children in school to avoid illiteracy. He concluded his bulletin by stating, "Let us make still one more 'drive,' and 'go over the top' for an efficient school system, thus laying the everlasting foundation of a government in which democracy will be safe."

Under Spaid's initiative to bring efficiency to the state's public school system, the Delaware State Board of Education adopted a new school code in 1919. According to Spaid its purpose was to provide an equal education for all Delaware students. He also noted that the code addressed the problem of illiteracy, which had been discovered by draft boards during World War I, and that the code sought to integrate all of Delaware's public schools into a coordinated state system. In May 1921, Spaid and the State Board of Education urged county superintendents and school principals to observe Memorial Day at their schools, in coordination with local Grand Army of the Republic, United Spanish War Veterans, and World War Veterans organizations. Spaid and the state board also recommended that school children bring flowers from home, place them at veterans' graves in local cemeteries, and be dismissed for the remainder of the school day. Spaid resigned as Delaware's State Commissioner of Education in 1921.

=== Later years ===
In 1921, after resigning as Delaware's State Commissioner of Education, Spaid left Delaware and began engaging in Chautauqua-related work. Around 1926, he became head of the Education Department at Salem University in Salem, West Virginia, and served in this position until 1936.

== Lecturer and writer ==
Spaid was a naturalist by hobby, and he took hundreds of photographs of objects in nature, which he used as illustrations in his nature study articles and lecture slides. Outside of his positions as a school administrator, Spaid was an instructor, lecturer, and speaker for multiple public courses, institutes, and organizations. In 1900 and 1902, he delivered illustrated lectures for the Natural History Society of Delaware at the Wilmington Friends School on the topics of "The Historic and Picturesque Shenandoah Valley", "Eggs and Feathers", and "Leaves and Blossoms." In 1901, Spaid delivered a lecture on reptiles entitled "Fangs, Fins and Stings" in the Breck's Mill Area of Wilmington, and in February and April 1904, he presented a lecture tour across northern Delaware with illustrated lectures on "Eggs and Feathers", "The Picturesque Luray Caverns", and "Historic Shenandoah Valley." Between 1903 and 1905, Spaid gave 100 public lectures to around 10,000 people, including a new lecture entitled, "Delaware, Nesting Place of the Blue Hen's Chickens". In April 1911, at a meeting of rural New Castle County teachers in Wilmington Spaid delivered a speech on birds. In November 1917, he addressed the annual convention of the Delaware Woman's Christian Temperance Union in Seaford on the importance of scientific temperance instruction in public schools. In June 1919, Spaid held an open-air meeting on faith and asserted that "one outstanding result" of World War I "was a return to elemental Christian faith."

In addition to his public lectures, Spaid delivered 100 lectures in the county's schools while serving as the New Castle County superintendent. He was also an instructor and lecturer for the Delaware State Summer School for 11 years, and for the Maryland State Summer School for two years. He served as a Sunday speaker for the temperance movement Anti-Saloon League in Delaware, Maryland, New York, and Pennsylvania for several years. In addition, Spaid was a lecturer in the People's Course at Newark, New Jersey, for five years, and was a lecturer at teachers' institutes in Delaware, Indiana, Maryland, New Jersey, Ohio, and Pennsylvania.

=== Publications ===
In addition to public speaking, Spaid was an avid writer. His articles on the subjects of history and nature included:

- "Slavery in Pennsylvania". The American Historical Register and Monthly Gazette of the Patriotic–Hereditary Societies of the United States of America. Vol. ii. Philadelphia: The Historical Register Publishing Company. March–August 1895. pp. 1181–1187. OCLC 565053224.
- "Some of Our Common Snakes.—I". Scientific American. Vol. 89, no. 20. New York: Munn and Company. November 14, 1903. pp. 352–353. ISSN 0036-8733.
- "Harmless Little Reptile". Scientific American. 1904. ISSN 0036-8733.
- "Among the Holly Gatherers". Country Life in America. Vol. XIII, no. 2. New York: Doubleday, Page & Company. December 1907. pp. 230–236. OCLC 844607264.

Spaid had planned to write a book on his nature studies, for which he had written notes and collected specimens. However, in May 1917, he lost his home to a fire, which destroyed the notebooks containing his life's work in nature study.

== Death ==
In mid-February 1936, Spaid became ill while visiting his niece, Mrs. Lee Calvert, in Washington, D.C. Two weeks later, he was taken to the home of his daughter, Margaret Spaid LaFollette, in Winchester, Virginia. He suffered a heart attack on March 15, 1936 and died of heart failure the following day. Spaid was survived by his wife and five children. His funeral service was held at the Christian Church in Winchester on March 19, 1936. Spaid was interred at Mount Hebron Cemetery in Winchester. Spaid's obituary in the Wilmington Morning News wrote that he had "devoted his life to educational work".

== Personal life ==
=== Marriage and children ===
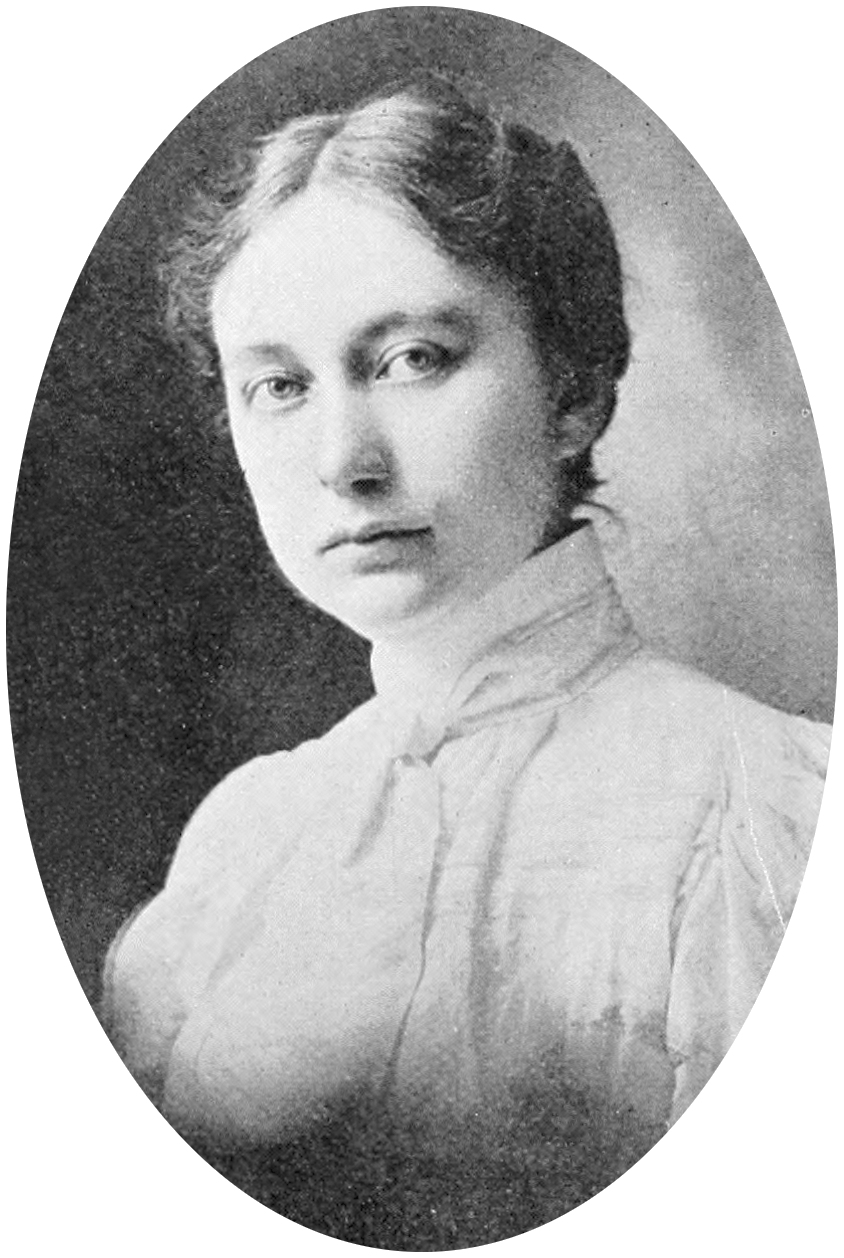
Spaid's wife, Mary Abi Farquhar Spaid

Spaid married Mary Abi Farquhar on September 30, 1897. Farquhar was born on April 11, 1872, and was the daughter of Benjamin and Mary B. Farquhar of Wilmington, Ohio. She graduated from Wilmington College in June 1894, a year after Spaid. Farquhar underwent training in a year-long kindergarten teaching class in Columbus and worked as a kindergarten teacher at the Alexis I. duPont School. Spaid and his wife had six children, consisting of two daughters and four sons:

- Arthur Farquhar Spaid (July 10, 1898 – November 12, 1989)
- Harold Blin Spaid (June 1, 1900 – May 27, 1903)
- Charles Dalney Spaid (February 21, 1904 – August 7, 1949)
- Mary Margaret Spaid LaFollette (January 26, 1906 – June 26, 1965), married Russell Olin LaFollette
- Ralph Stirling Spaid (June 18, 1908 – January 21, 1976)
- Ruth Louise Spaid David (September 22, 1909 – April 16, 1983), married Miles David

=== Civic and religious affiliations ===
In April 1900, Spaid was a founding member and first president of the Delaware Audubon Society, with "its object being the protection of birds and the discouraging of their use in wearing apparel and for the purposes of ornament." He served as a state director of Delaware's National Education Association and was a member of the National Society for the Promotion of Vocational Education. Spaid was also a member of the Ancient Order of United Workmen, the National Grange of the Order of Patrons of Husbandry, and the Methodist Episcopal Church. He held offices in both the Ancient Order of United Workmen and the National Grange. While he resided in Wilmington, Delaware, Spaid was a member of the Washington Heights Methodist Episcopal Church, and one of the founders of the McCabe Memorial Methodist Episcopal Church. He became a member of the American Museum of Natural History in 1935.

== Bibliography ==
- Harloe, Charles Bruce, ed. (1943). Harloe–Kelso Genealogy of the Descendants of John William Harloe and James Kelso, From the Beginning of Their Lineages in This Country to the Present Time, With a Number of Allied Families and Many Historical Facts. Winchester, Virginia: Dr. Charles Bruce Harloe; Pifer Printing Company. OCLC 192102027 – via Internet Archive.
- Haverford College, ed. (1905). Haverford College Bulletin Graduate Register 1836–1904. Vol. III. Haverford, Pennsylvania: Haverford College. OCLC 1048334043 – via Internet Archive.
- Maxwell, Hu; Swisher, Howard Llewellyn (1897). History of Hampshire County, West Virginia From Its Earliest Settlement to the Present. Morgantown, West Virginia: A. Brown Boughner, Printer. OCLC 680931891 – via Internet Archive.
- Secrest, Abraham Thompson, ed. (1922). Spaid Genealogy from the First of the Name in This Country to the Present Time with A Number of Allied Families and Many Historical Facts. Columbus, Ohio: Nitschke Brothers. OCLC 285160392 – via Internet Archive.
- Thomas, Allen C., ed. (1900). Biographical Catalogue of the Matriculates of Haverford College Together with Lists of the Members of the College Faculty and the Managers, Officers and Recipients of Honorary Degrees, 1833–1900. Philadelphia: Haverford College Alumni Association, Sherman and Company. OCLC 551359046 – via Internet Archive.
- Wiley, Edwin; Rines, Irving E., eds. (1913). The United States: Its Beginnings, Progress and Modern Development. Vol. 7. New York: American Educational Alliance. OCLC 12955408. Archived from the original on October 1, 2020 – via Google Books.
