= Caudy's Castle =

Rock pinnacle in West Virginia, United States

Coordinates: 39.3817650°N 78.4288976°W

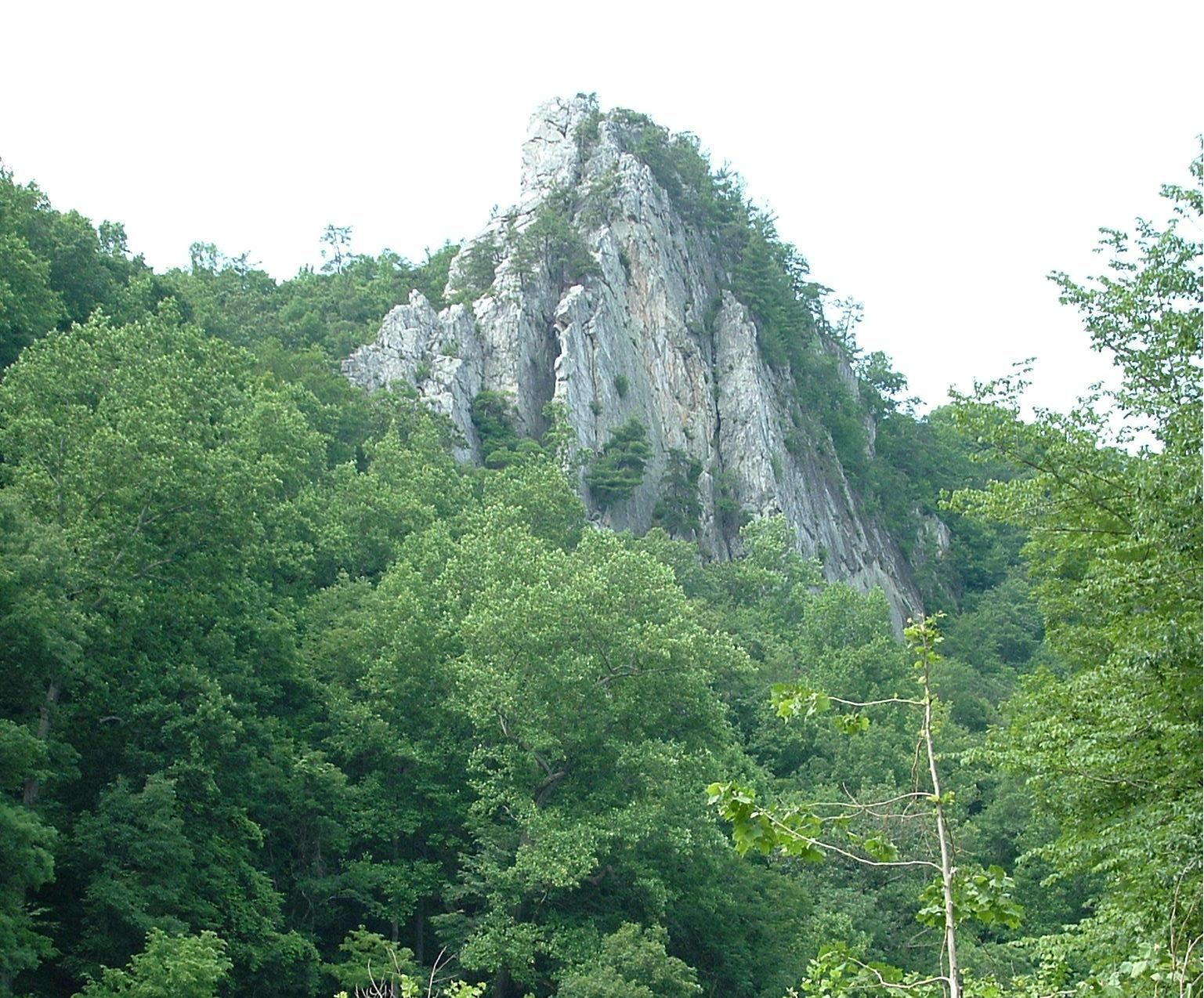

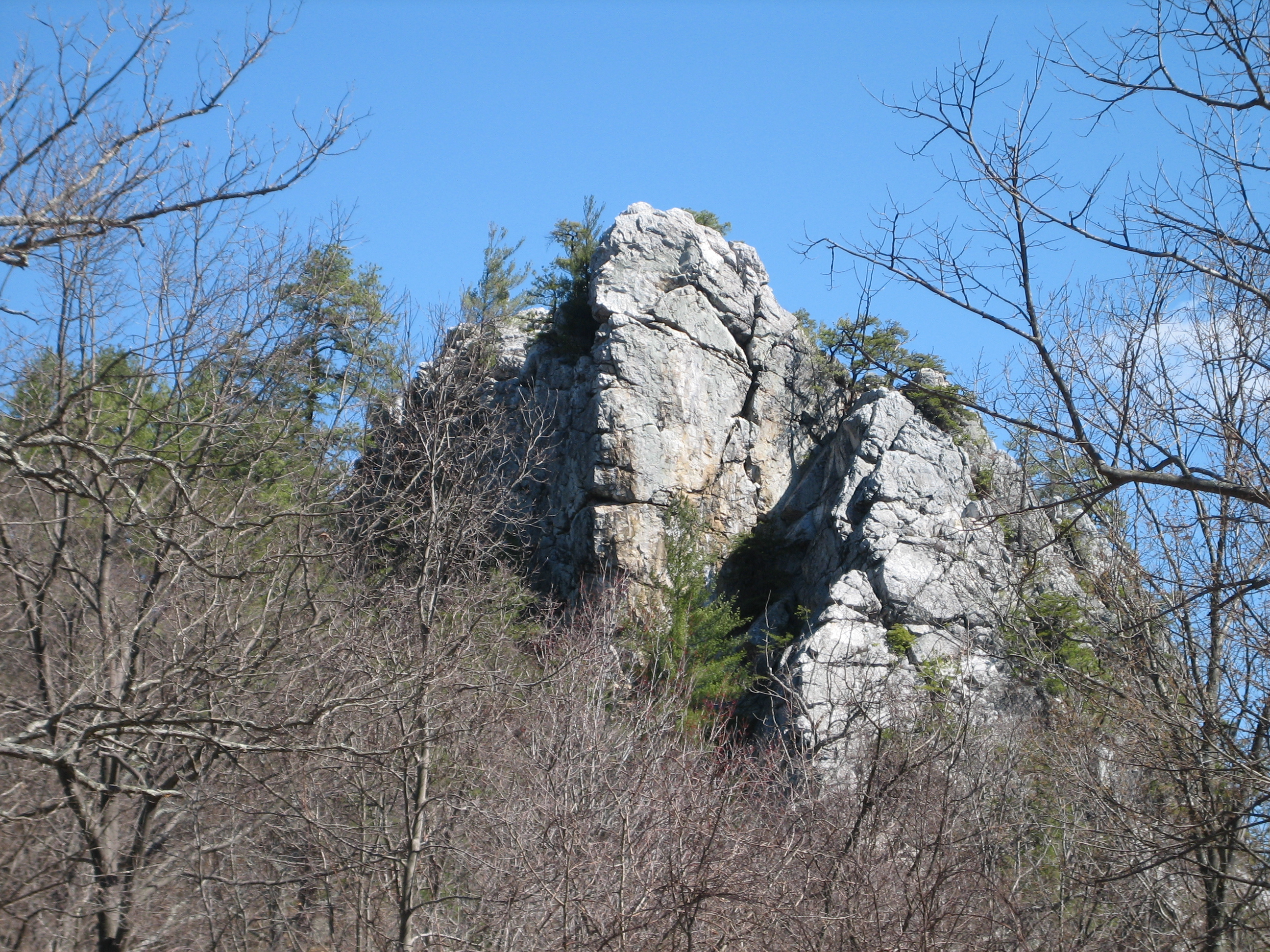
Photo of Caudy's Castle (Spring 2006)

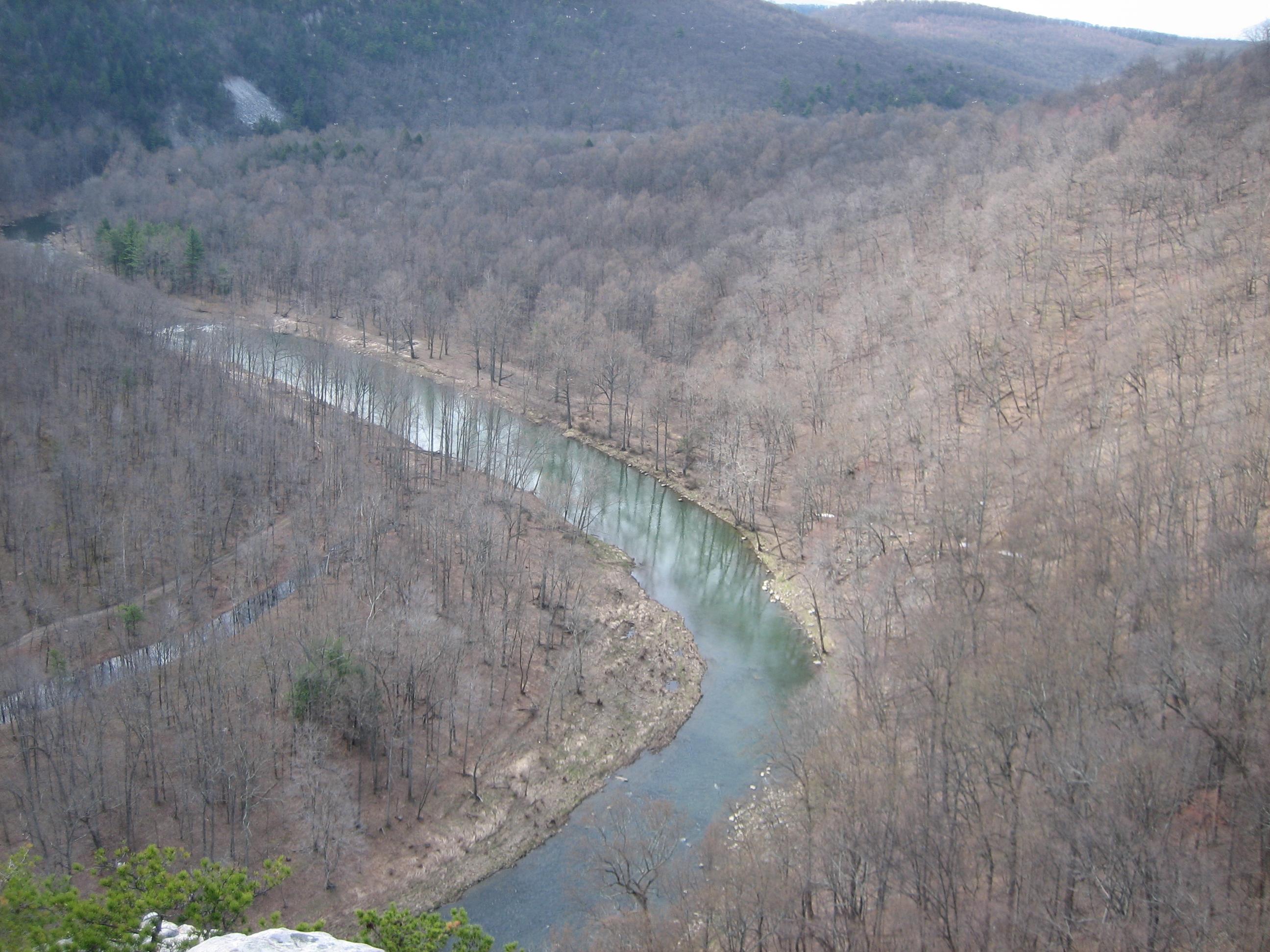
Photo taken from atop Caudy's Castle (Spring 2007)

Caudy's Castle is a rock pinnacle of Ridgeley (Oriskany) sandstone that stands 1,070 feet (326 m) above sea level over the Cacapon River near the Bloomery Pike (West Virginia Route 127) south of Forks of Cacapon in Hampshire County, West Virginia, United States. The rock formation is named after James Caudy, an early Hampshire County pioneer and settler who fought off an attack by fifteen Native Americans from the rock during the French and Indian War. Caudy's Castle is also known as the Castle Rock. The pillar lies on the southern end of its namesake, Castle Mountain.
