= Dillons Run =

Tributary stream of the Cacapon River in West Virginia

Coordinates: 39°17′52″N 78°26′08″W

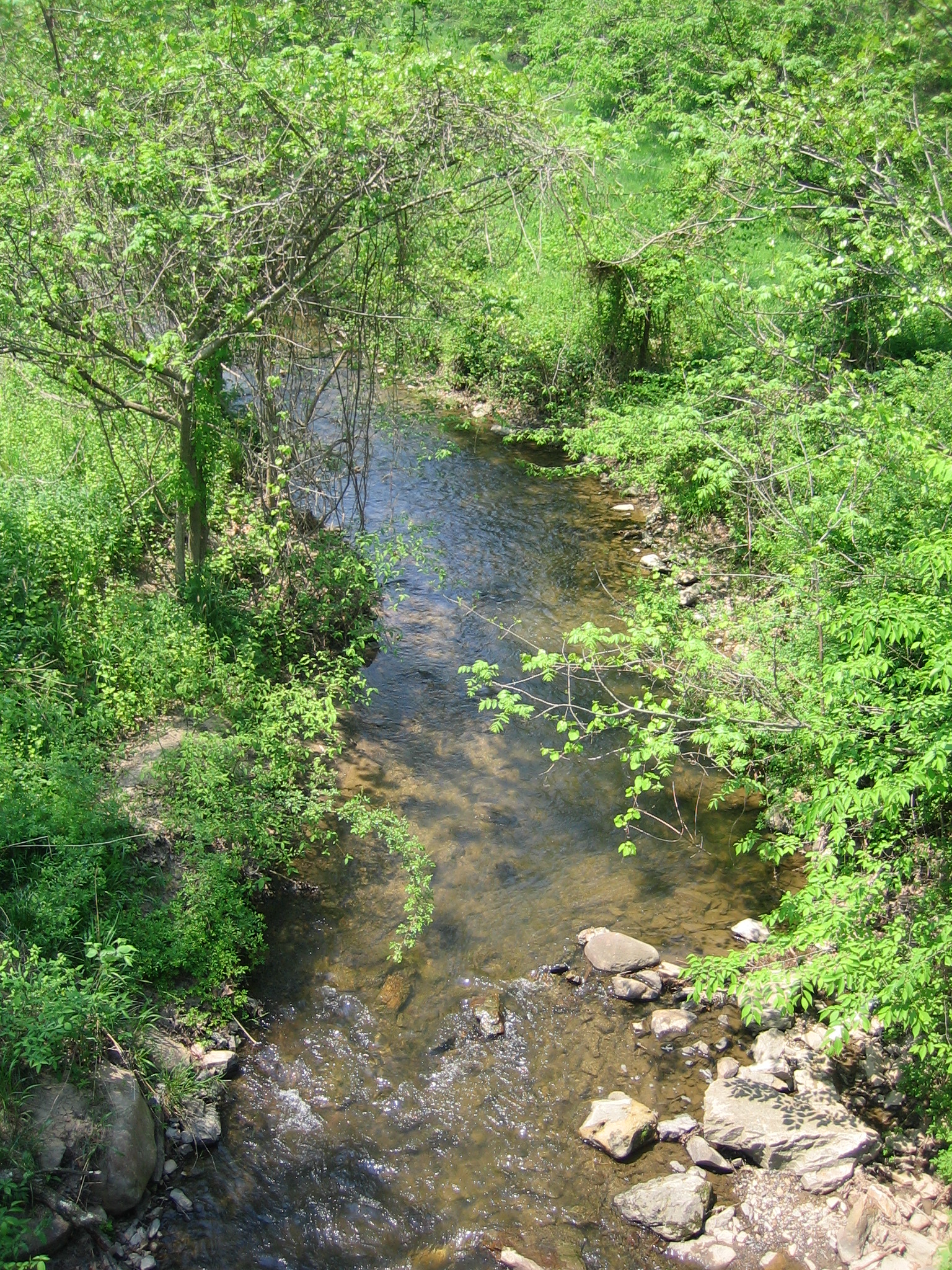
Dillons Run at Capon Bridge

Dillons Run is a 12.9-mile-long (20.8 km) tributary stream of the Cacapon River, belonging to the Potomac River and Chesapeake Bay watersheds. The stream is located in Hampshire County in the U.S. state of West Virginia's Eastern Panhandle.

== Headwaters and course ==
Dillons Run's source lies in a hollow along the southeastern end of Cooper Mountain (2,028 feet), south of the community of Millbrook. The stream follows Dillons Run Road (County Route 50/25) northeast through Millbrook, turning east through Millbrook Gap, joining a stream flowing from Parks Hollow. Dillons Run continues northeast, adjoining Dillons Run Road while flowing by the community of Dillons Run. After Dillons Run, the stream then meets with another stream flowing out of Gunbarrel Hollow, and continues northeast towards Capon Bridge between Schaffenaker (1493 feet) and Dillons (1913 feet) Mountains. At the northern end of Dillons Mountain, Dillons Run flows east, parallel to the Northwestern Turnpike (U.S. Route 50) and then under Cacapon River Road (County Route 14) before emptying into the Cacapon River south of the Capon Bridge. While paralleling U.S. Route 50, Dillons Run runs through a small grassy field in front of the historic home, Moss Rock.

== Trout fishing ==
Dillons Run is stocked with rainbow and brook trout from the Dillons Run Road (County Route 50/25) bridge upstream three miles to Millbrook. This portion of the stream is situated approximately six miles southeast of Capon Bridge. Dillons Run is stocked once in February and once every two weeks from March through May by the West Virginia Division of Natural Resources.

== See also ==
- List of West Virginia rivers
