= Edwards Run Wildlife Management Area =

State Wildlife Management Area in Hampshire County, West Virginia

- IUCN category V (protected landscape/seascape)
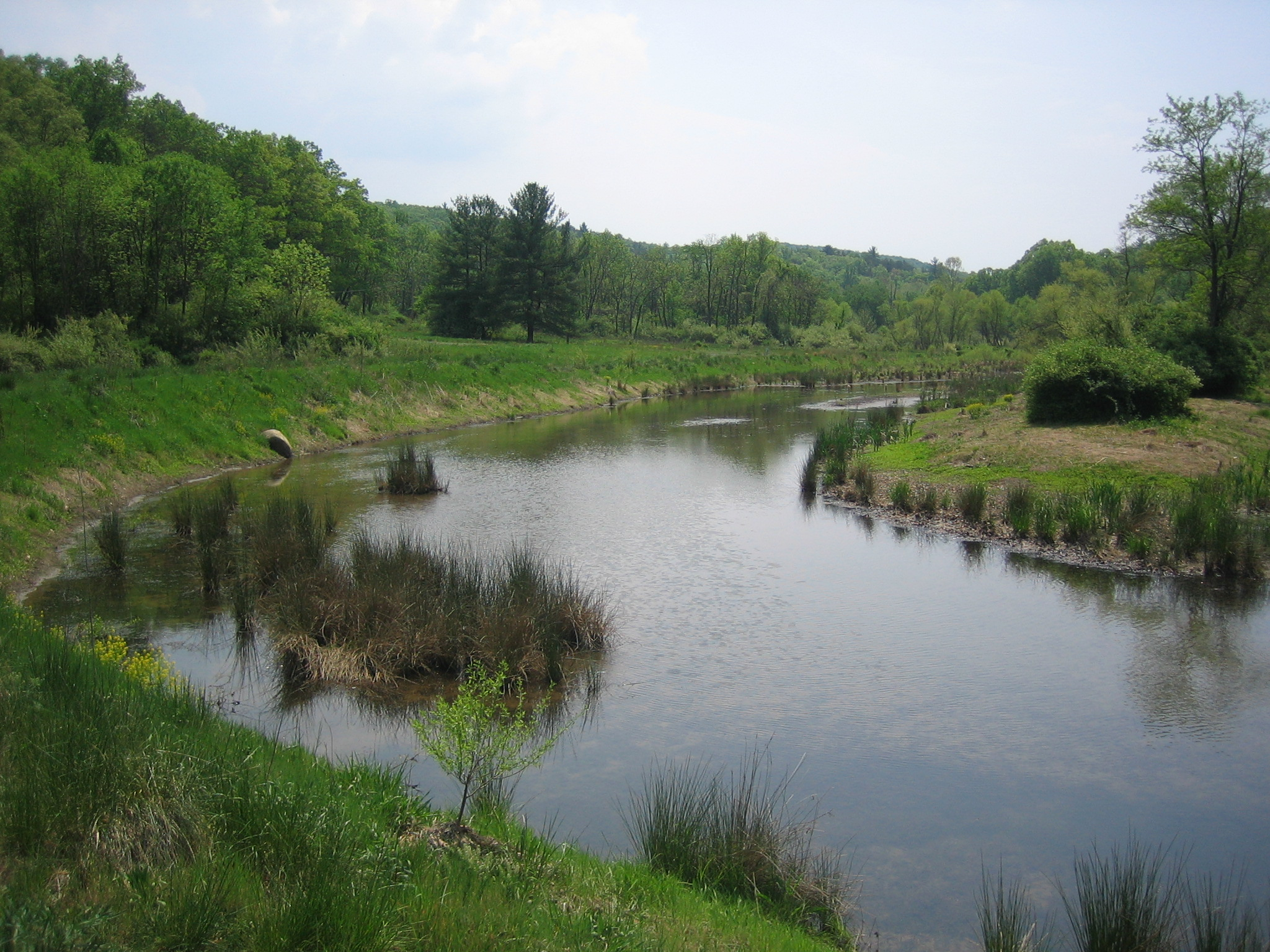
- Edwards Pond in Edwards Run WMA.

- Location within West Virginia
- Location: Hampshire, West Virginia, United States
- Coordinates: 39°19′21″N 78°26′16″W
- Area: 397 acres (161 ha)
- Elevation: 816 ft (249 m)
- Website: WVDNR District 2 Wildlife Management Areas

Edwards Run Wildlife Management Area is located on 397 acres (1.6 km^{2}) two miles (3 km) north of Capon Bridge on Cold Stream Road (County Route 15) near Cold Stream in Hampshire County, West Virginia. Edwards Run WMA is owned by the West Virginia Division of Natural Resources.

Edwards Run WMA primarily consists of low hills with steep slopes covered in forests of various species of oaks and hickories plus approximately 17 acres (69,000 m^{2}) of scattered clearings and brushy areas. White-tailed deer, turkey, quail, squirrel, rabbit, and grouse hunting opportunities are available in the wildlife management area. A section of Edwards Run and a 2-acre (8,100 m^{2}) lake, Edwards Pond, provide fishing for smallmouth and largemouth bass, sunfish, bluegill, and channel catfish. Edwards Run and Pond are also stocked with trout February through March and in October. The stream on the WMA is a designated catch and release trout stream. A primitive camping area is in proximity to Edwards Pond and pit toilets and trash receptacles are provided. A nominal camping fee is charged by the WVDNR.

== See also ==
- Edwards Run
- Animal conservation
- Fishing
- Hunting
- List of West Virginia wildlife management areas
