= Ward republic =

Proposed Jeffersonian concept of governance

Ward republic is a concept promoted by Thomas Jefferson to place most of the functions of government in the ward, a small subdivision of a county. Jefferson thought of this concept as his favorite: "The article nearest my heart," wrote Jefferson to Samuel Kercheval in 1816, "is the division of counties into wards". His proposal was that such wards consist of no more people than can all know one another and personally perform the functions of government for one another. Although his proposal was not generally adopted, there have been partial implementations of the idea in small townships, school districts, voting precincts, and neighborhood associations.

== History ==
The concept was inspired by the traditional practice in England and other feudal European countries to organize people below the county level into what were called "hundreds", that is, a geographic group of a few hundred individuals and their families. That concept goes back to a similar practice among the ancient Hebrews of organizing themselves for military purposes, and form a militia unit for each such group. Although intended for feudal administration and defense, hundreds also tended to cooperate in performing other functions of government.

Jefferson presented the idea in a letter to Samuel Kercheval in July, 1816. "The true foundation of republican government," Jefferson wrote, "is the equal right of every citizen in his person and property, and in their management". Kercheval, of Winchester, Virginia, had been trying to organize a convention to write a new state constitution, and sought the support of Jefferson, who had been trying since 1776 to get Virginia to adopt a new constitution.

In that letter Jefferson outlined the need for "ward republics," small units of local government, within Virginia's existing counties, which he thought were too large for direct participation of all the voters. He proposed to divide the counties into "wards of such size as that every citizen can attend, when called on, and act in person … will relieve the county administration of nearly all its business, will have it better done, and by making every citizen an acting member of the government, and in the offices nearest and most interesting to him, will attach him by his strongest feelings to the independence of his country, and its republican constitution".

Jefferson proposed that such ward republics, among their other functions, should select jurors, so that these units of local government would act as a restraint on the judicial as well as the legislative and executive branches of government.

One of the functions to be performed by such wards was public education. Jefferson's 1779 Bill for the More General Diffusion of Knowledge was never passed in the form he proposed. Virginia did not set up a system of mandatory common schools until well into the nineteenth century. However, the concepts it contained persisted and he continued to campaign for public education as the safeguard of republican citizenship.

Jefferson's Bill proposed that each county would be divided into "hundreds … so as that they may contain a convenient number of children to make up a school, and be of such convenient size that all the children within each hundred may daily attend the school to be established therein". Jefferson's deliberate use of the term "hundreds" echoes the Anglo-Saxon term for such a political sub-division. He and many of his contemporaries believed that English and American liberties were rooted in Anglo-Saxon political life. These "hundreds" are the origins of Jefferson's later conception of "ward republics," political units so small that "every citizen, can attend, when called on, and act in person". The school system was envisioned as tiered, from primary to secondary to college, so that the ward republics were to be the smallest, most intimate parts of political life and the basis for state republics and the national republic.

== Modern practices ==
The term "ward" or "precinct" continues to be used for subdivisions of counties or municipalities, but usually only as voting districts to send representatives to county government, or for the administration of county or municipal functions. Most of those subdivisions contain too many people to fit Jefferson's vision. The closest would be voting precincts, which in most states tend to consist of about 3,000 people. There are also small townships and neighborhood associations that realize that concept for at least some people.

Jefferson envisioned a society of small landholders, continuing the system set up by John Locke for the colonies that became North and South Carolina. However, the adoption of the fee simple model of land titles encouraged large landholdings that would make it more difficult to establish ward republics everywhere.

The ward republic model has continued to be advocated by reformers, especially some Libertarians, who argue that the trend toward government centralization presents a threat to rights and liberty, discourages civic virtue, and encourages dependency.
