= Edwards Run =

River in West Virginia, United States

Coordinates: 39°19′57″N 78°25′28″W

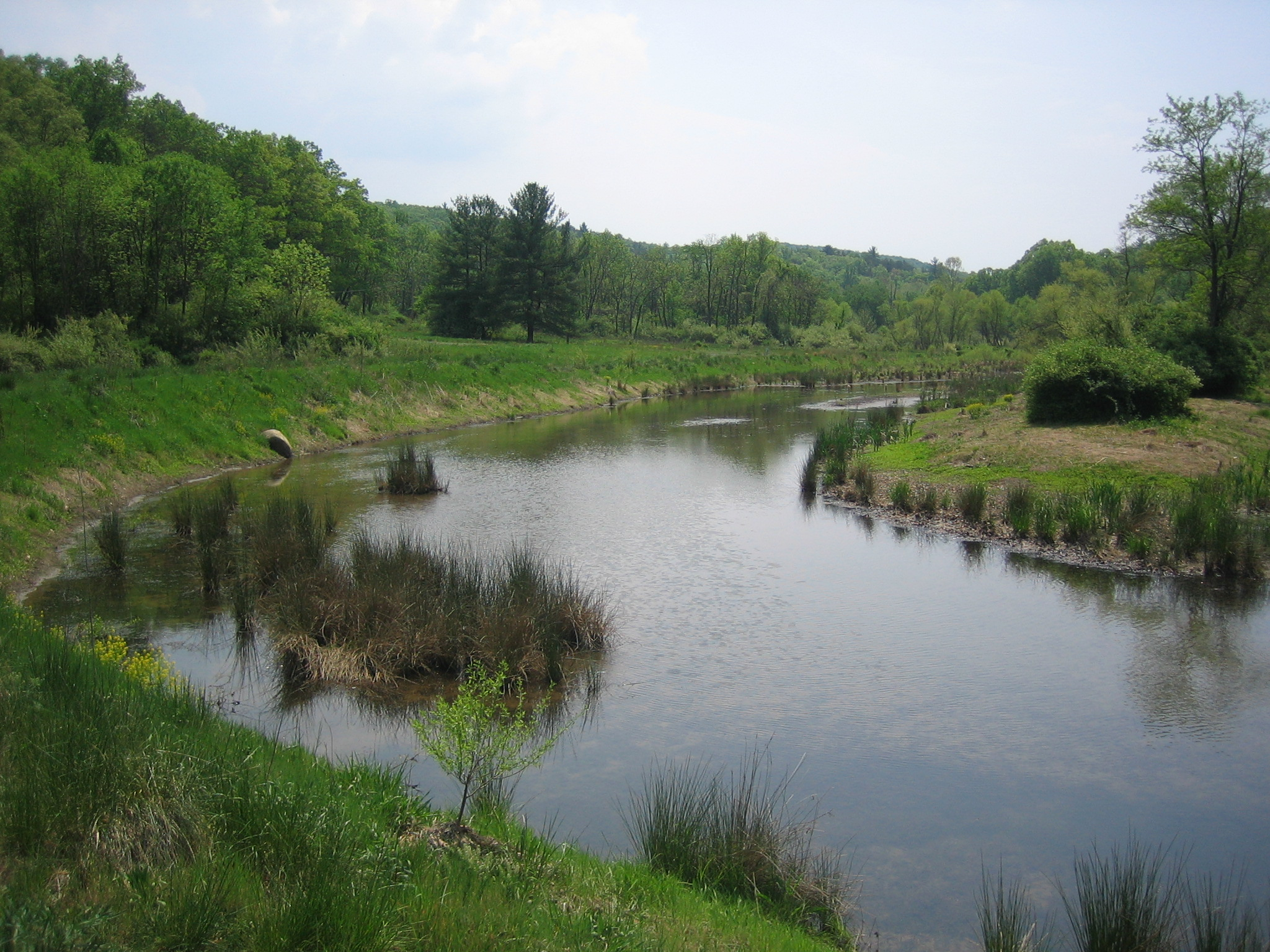
Edwards Pond at Edwards Run Wildlife Management Area

Edwards Run is a 7.9-mile-long (12.7 km) tributary stream of the Cacapon River, belonging to the Potomac River and Chesapeake Bay watersheds. The stream is located in Hampshire County in the U.S. state of West Virginia's Eastern Panhandle. Edwards Run is named for Joseph Edwards and his family, whose plantation encompassed most of the stream's course. George Washington surveyed his property in the late 1740s. It is a major source of various species of elodea.

== Headwaters and course ==
The source of Edwards Run lies between Cooper (2,028 ft) and Schaffenaker (1,493 ft) Mountains, southwest of Capon Bridge. Edwards Run flows northeast under the Northwestern Turnpike (U.S. Route 50) continuing to follow the western side of Schaffenaker Mountain. Edwards Run then flows through the Edwards Run Wildlife Management Area where it is dammed creating the 2-acre (0.81 ha) lake, Edwards Pond. The stream flows under Cold Stream Road (County Route 15) and into the Cacapon River south of Cold Stream.

== Fishing ==
Edwards Pond provides fishing for bass, sunfish, bluegill and channel catfish. Edwards Run and Pond are also stocked with trout February through March and in October.

== See also ==
- List of West Virginia rivers
