= Millbrook, West Virginia =

- Unincorporated community
- Location within West Virginia Location within the United States
- Coordinates: 39°12′59″N 78°32′50″W
- Country: United States
- State: West Virginia
- County: Hampshire
- Time zone: UTC-5 (Eastern (EST))
  - Summer (DST): UTC-4 (EDT)
- GNIS feature ID: 1552139

Millbrook is an unincorporated community in Hampshire County, West Virginia, United States. Millbrook is located along Dillons Run on Dillons Run Road (West Virginia Secondary Route 50/25) in southeastern Hampshire County.
