= Hampshire County, West Virginia =

County in West Virginia, United States

- County
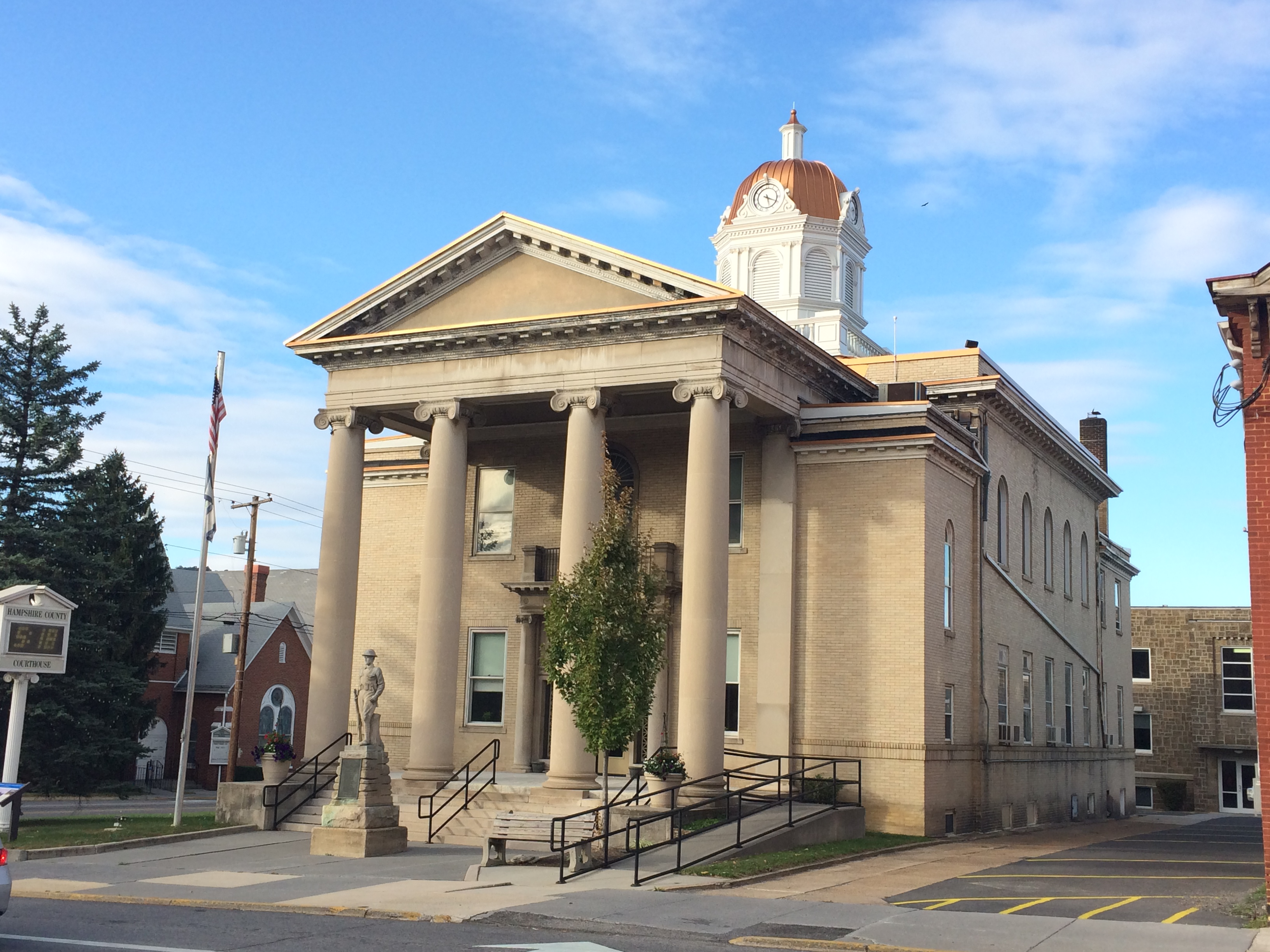
- Hampshire County Courthouse

- Seal

- Location within the U.S. state of West Virginia
- Coordinates: 39°19′N 78°37′W
- Country: United States
- State: West Virginia
- Founded: December 13, 1754
- Named for: Hampshire, England
- Seat: Romney
- Largest city: Romney

Area
  - Total: 645 sq mi (1,670 km^{2})
  - Land: 640 sq mi (1,700 km^{2})
  - Water: 4.4 sq mi (11 km^{2}) 0.7%

Population (2020)
  - Total: 23,093
  - Estimate (2025): 24,105 ▲
  - Density: 36/sq mi (14/km^{2})
- Time zone: UTC−5 (Eastern)
  - Summer (DST): UTC−4 (EDT)
- Congressional district: 2nd
- Website: www.hampshirewv.com

Hampshire County is a county in the U.S. state of West Virginia. As of the 2020 census, the population was 23,093. Its county seat is Romney, West Virginia's oldest town (1762). The county was created by the Virginia General Assembly in 1754, from parts of Frederick and Augusta Counties (Virginia) and is the state's oldest county. The county lies in West Virginia's Potomac Highlands region.

Hampshire County is part of the Winchester, VA-WV Metropolitan Statistical Area.

== Name ==
Hampshire County, 1888

Although its creation was authorized in 1754, Hampshire County was not actually organized until 1757 because the area was not considered safe due to the outbreak of the French and Indian War (1754–1763). According to Samuel Kercheval's A History of the Valley of Virginia (1833), the county was named in honor of its several prize hogs. The story goes that Thomas Fairfax, 6th Lord Fairfax of Cameron (1693–1781), who owned the Royal Grant to the area, came upon some very large hogs in Winchester and asked where they had been raised. He was told that they were from the South Branch Potomac River Valley (now Hampshire County). He remarked that when a county was formed west of Frederick that he would name it in honor of the county Hampshire, England, famous for its very fat hogs.

== History ==
=== Earliest European settlers ===
Romney was initially settled by hunters and traders around 1725. In 1738, John Pearsall (or Pearsoll) and his brother Job built homes and in 1758 a fort (Fort Pearsall) for defense against Native Americans in present-day Romney. Their settlement was then known as Pearsall's Flats. In 1748, Thomas Fairfax, 6th Lord Fairfax of Cameron sent a surveying party, including 16-year-old George Washington, to survey his lands along the Potomac and South Branch Potomac rivers. Washington spent three summers and falls surveying Lord Fairfax's Northern Neck estate, which included all of the present-day Eastern Panhandle of West Virginia. In April 1748, he laid off several lots in an area known as the Trough, about ten miles (16 km) south of Romney, and he is known to have been in present-day Romney on October 19, 1749. Oral traditions claimed that Washington laid present-day Romney out into lots at that time, but written records from that era indicate that Romney was surveyed and laid out into lots by James Genn prior to Washington's arrival. Genn was also employed by Lord Fairfax.

=== 18th century Hampshire County ===
In 1756, Fort Pearsall was constructed on Job Pearsall's plantation for protection against Native American raids and George Washington provisioned and garrisoned the Fort at various times until 1758. At that time, there were at least 100 people living in the general area. Following the end of hostilities in the area, Lord Fairfax recognized that more settlers would be interested in moving into the area and that he could earn some extra revenue by selling plots in the town. He sent a survey party to Romney in 1762 to formally lay out the town into 100 lots. At that time, he renamed the town Romney, in honor of the Cinque Ports city on the English Channel in Kent.

Confusion ensued for several decades concerning land ownership within the town, as counterclaims were made by the original settlers, and those who purchased lots laid out by Lord Fairfax's surveyors.

The first meeting of the Hampshire County Court was held in 1757, at Fort Pleasant, now Old Fields in Hardy County, and was presided by the Right Honorable Thomas Bryan Martin, Lord Fairfax's nephew. By that time, Hampshire County's population had fallen dramatically as most of the settlers had fled the county in fear of the Native Americans. The only families remaining lived near Fort Pearsall, near present-day Romney, and Fort Edwards, at present-day Capon Bridge on the Cacapon River. The vast majority of the remaining settlers, however, were in the vicinity of present Old Fields-Moorefield-Petersburg and were protected by the several forts in the area, including Fort Pleasant

Once the Native Americans were defeated at the Battle of Point Pleasant in 1774 settlers, once again, returned to the county. Additionally, with the end of the American Revolution, the Virginia Legislature nullified the English grant to Lord Fairfax in the region. The legislature gave fee simple grants to settlers who already had contracts with Lord Fairfax, and opened up the remaining lands as public domain open to settlement. By 1790, when the first national census was taken, Hampshire County had 7,346 residents, making it the second most populous county in the present state of West Virginia at that time. Berkeley was the most populous county, with 19,713 people. There were nine counties that comprised the present state, with a total population of 55,873 people.

During the Whiskey Rebellion in 1794, many Hampshire County men volunteered to serve under Major General Daniel Morgan to put down the insurrection. The men most likely volunteered at Moorefield in Hardy County and then marched north to Cumberland, Maryland. Approximately 1,200 of the 12,950 men under Morgan's command came from the area that would later become West Virginia.

=== Early churches ===
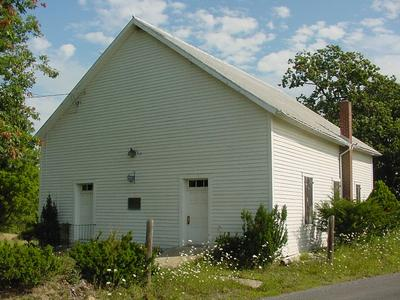
Mount Bethel Church at Three Churches, WV.

Many early settlers of the Cacapon area were German Baptist Brethren (or Dunkers), pacifist farmers who often befriended local natives in frontier areas. Other early missionaries helped to sustain the religious faith of the early European inhabitants. In 1775, two Baptist missionaries among a group of settlers moved to the Cacapon and organized the first European church in the county. In 1771, the work of the Methodist Episcopal Church was begun, in which later developments led to the formation of the Methodist Episcopal Church, South. In 1753, Hampshire County had been formed into a parish by the Protestant Episcopal Church, and from 1772 until his death in 1777, Rev. Nathaniel Manning served on the Glebe near present-day Moorefield. In 1787, a Primitive Baptist church was established at North River. Soon after the American Revolution, there was preaching by the Presbyterians at different points in the county. In 1792, a Presbyterian church was organized at Romney and another, Mount Bethel Church, at Three Churches.

=== Early industry ===
The wide lowlands of Hampshire County certainly invited agriculture, and fields of wheat and tobacco surrounded the important truck-patch of the settler. The rolling uplands offered pasturage for horses, cattle, sheep, and hogs, which were driven across country to market at Winchester. The streams abounded in fish and the mountains contained not only game but timber and stone for early settlers' homes. The limestone was burned for lime at Bloomery Gap, where remains of old lime-kilns give evidence of an early industry. Soon it was discovered that some of the strata contained iron ore. Much of it was transported to present-day Keyser, from an area along South Branch Potomac River south of the present limits of the county. In Bloomery Gap, a ruined furnace still stands, mute evidence of another former industry. In the early days the increasing population stimulated not only farming and grazing but every industry of a new country. Hampshire County was also known for its many gunmakers, located on or near the main road from Winchester to Romney. Among them were, Henry Topper, Jacob Kline, George Young, Benjamin Shane, George Glaze, William Britton and the Sheetz Family.

=== 19th century Hampshire County ===
The building of the Northwestern Turnpike (U.S. Route 50) was an integral part of the development of Hampshire County. General Daniel Morgan first suggested the road be built in 1748, but his recommendations were not acted upon until the 1830s. Colonel Claudius Crozet, a Frenchman who had previously worked for Napoleon Bonaparte, engineered the road which connected Parkersburg with Winchester, Virginia. The turnpike traversed Hampshire County stretching through the communities of Capon Bridge, Loom, Hanging Rock, Pleasant Dale, Augusta, Frenchburg, Shanks, and Romney. Through the years, Romney became an important rest stop for travelers on the turnpike. This aided the local economy as hotels and taverns began to appear in the area.

During the American Civil War, the Hampshire Guards and Frontier Riflemen joined the Confederate Army. Although there were no major battles in Hampshire County, Romney changed hands at least fifty-six times during the war. It was often a case of one army evacuating the area allowing the opposing army to move into the town. This places Romney second behind Winchester as the town that changed hands the most during the American Civil War. On June 11, 1861, it changed hands twice in the same day. Some local Hampshire County historians speculate that Romney actually changed hands more than Winchester, but there are no surviving records to support the claim.

In 1863, West Virginia's counties were divided into civil townships, with the intention of encouraging local government. This proved impractical in the heavily rural state, and in 1872 the townships were converted into magisterial districts. Between 1866, when Mineral County was formed from the western portion of Hampshire County, and 1871, when part of southern Mineral County was returned to Hampshire, the county was divided into six townships: Bloomery, Capon, (Note: Also called "Capon Springs" in early records.) Gore, Romney, Sherman, and Springfield. These became magisterial districts in 1872, and a seventh district, Mill Creek, was formed in part from the land that had been in Mineral County from 1866 to 1871.

== Geography ==
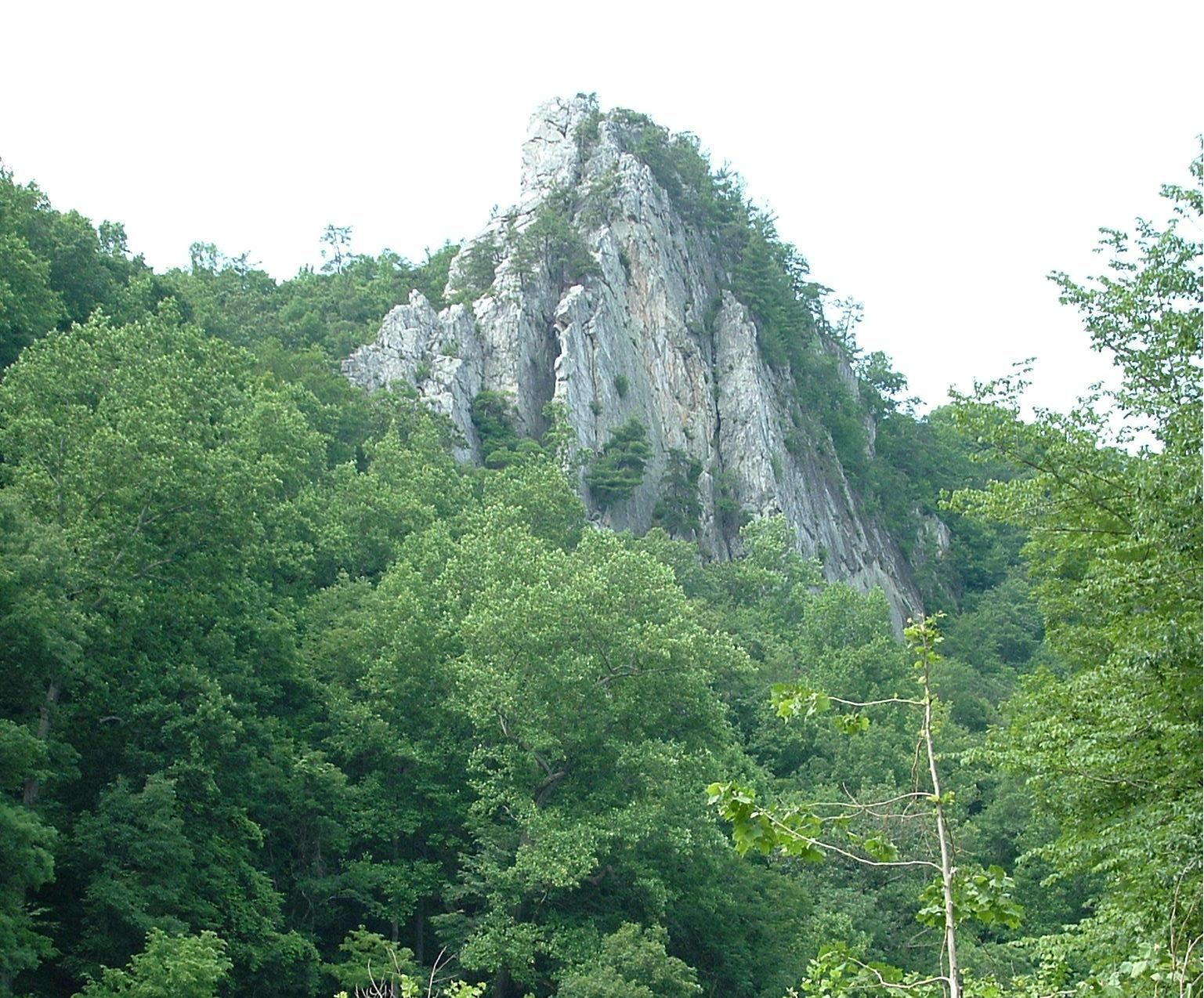
Caudy's Castle

According to the United States Census Bureau, the county has a total area of 645 square miles (1,670 km^{2}), of which 640 square miles (1,700 km^{2}) is land and 4.4 square miles (11 km^{2}) (0.7%) is water.

=== Major highways ===
- U.S. Route 50
- U.S. Route 220
- West Virginia Route 9
- West Virginia Route 28
- West Virginia Route 29
- West Virginia Route 127
- West Virginia Route 259

=== Adjacent counties ===
- Allegany County, Maryland (north)
- Morgan County (northeast)
- Frederick County, Virginia (east)
- Hardy County (south)
- Mineral County (west)

=== Rivers and streams ===
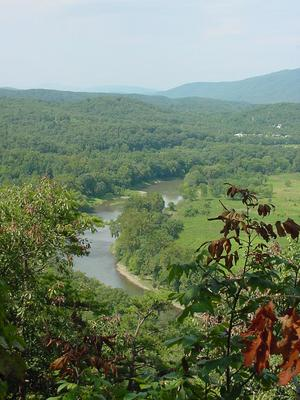
South Branch Potomac River near South Branch Depot

- Potomac River
  - Cacapon River
    - Capon Springs Run
    - Dillons Run
    - Edwards Run
    - Mill Branch
    - North River
      - Grassy Lick Run
      - Tearcoat Creek
        - Bearwallow Creek
  - Little Cacapon River
    - North Fork Little Cacapon River
    - South Fork Little Cacapon River
  - North Branch Potomac River
    - Green Spring Run
  - South Branch Potomac River
    - Big Run
    - Buffalo Creek
    - Mill Creek
    - Mill Run

==== Mountains ====
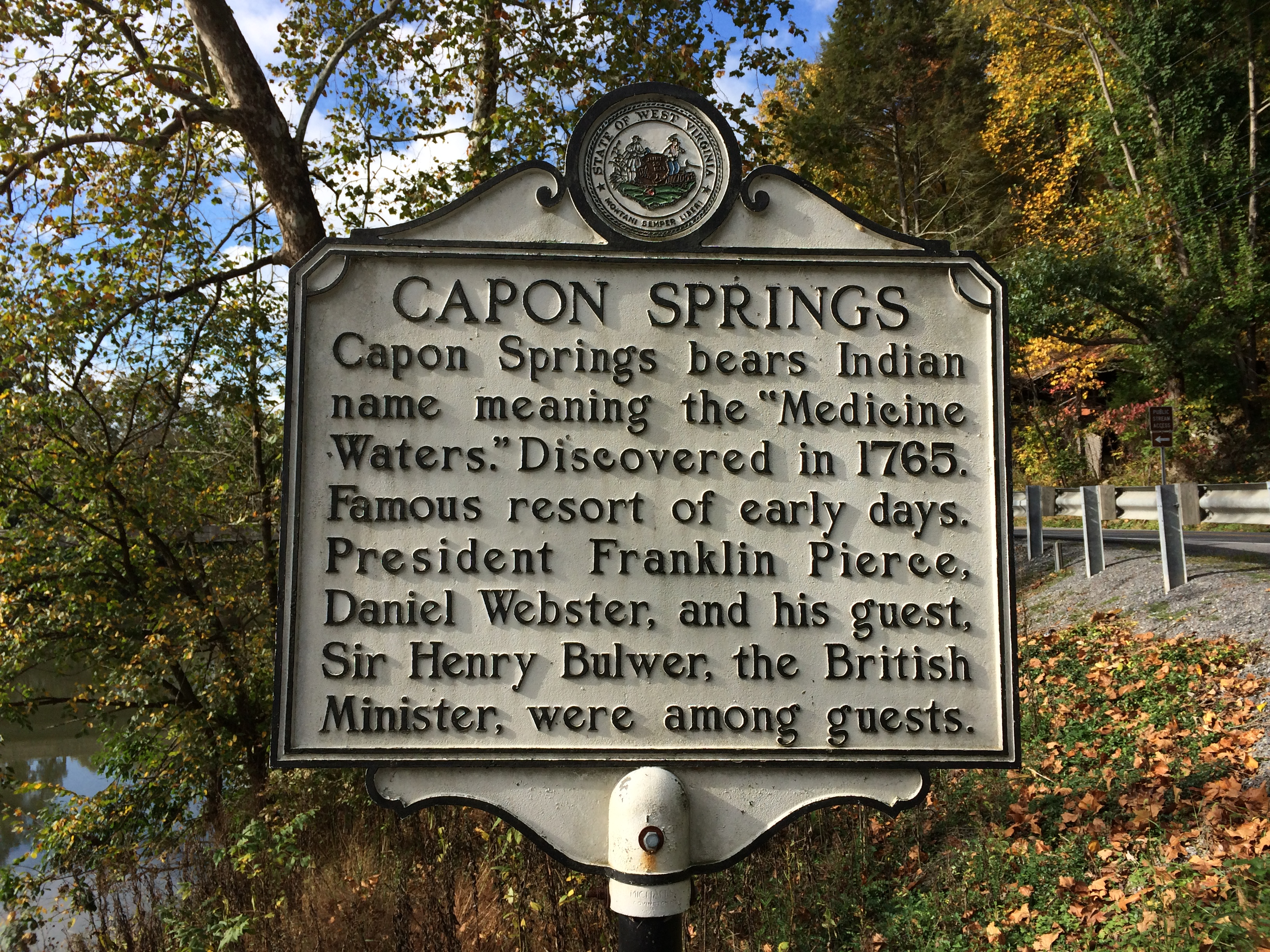
Capon Springs

- South Branch Mountain, 3,028 feet (923 m)
- Pinnacle Ridge, 2,844 feet (867 m)
- Nathaniel Mountain, 2,739 feet (835 m)
- Mill Creek Mountain, 2,648 feet (807 m)
- Cacapon Mountain, 2,618 feet (798 m)
- Spring Mountain, 2,436 feet (742 m)
- Spring Gap Mountain, 2,237 feet (682 m)
- North River Mountain, 2,149 feet (655 m)
- Cooper Mountain, 2,028 feet (618 m)
- Baker Mountain, 2,024 feet (617 m)
- Patterson Creek Mountain, 2,005 feet (611 m)
- Sideling Hill, 1,930 feet (590 m)
- Little Cacapon Mountain, 1,575 feet (480 m)
- Ice Mountain, 1,489 feet (454 m)
- The Devil's Nose, 1,121 feet (342 m)

==== Other geological formations ====
- Caudy's Castle
- Hanging Rocks
- Mechanicsburg Gap
- The Trough

== Demographics ==
Historical population
Census	Pop.	Note	%±
1790	7,346		—
1800	8,348		13.6%
1810	9,784		17.2%
1820	10,889		11.3%
1830	11,279		3.6%
1840	12,295		9.0%
1850	14,036		14.2%
1860	13,913		−0.9%
1870	7,643		−45.1%
1880	10,366		35.6%
1890	11,419		10.2%
1900	11,806		3.4%
1910	11,694		−0.9%
1920	11,713		0.2%
1930	11,836		1.1%
1940	12,974		9.6%
1950	12,577		−3.1%
1960	11,705		−6.9%
1970	11,710		0.0%
1980	14,867		27.0%
1990	16,498		11.0%
2000	20,203		22.5%
2010	23,964		18.6%
2020	23,093		−3.6%
2025 (est.)	24,105	▲	4.4%
U.S. Decennial Census; 1790–1960 1900–1990; 1990–2000 2010-2020

=== 2020 census ===
As of the 2020 census, the county had a population of 23,093 and 9,612 households. Of the residents, 19.5% were under the age of 18 and 22.9% were 65 years of age or older; the median age was 47.1 years. For every 100 females there were 104.7 males, and for every 100 females age 18 and over there were 103.2 males.

The racial makeup of the county was 94.3% White, 0.8% Black or African American, 0.2% American Indian and Alaska Native, 0.3% Asian, 0.7% from some other race, and 3.8% from two or more races. Hispanic or Latino residents of any race comprised 1.5% of the population.

There were 9,612 households, of which 24.8% had children under the age of 18 living with them. Of those households, 51.5% were married couples living together, 22.7% had a female householder with no spouse or partner present, and 20.8% had a male householder with no spouse present. The average household and family size was 3.57. About 29.5% of all households were made up of individuals and 15.0% had someone living alone who was 65 years of age or older.

There were 12,416 housing units, of which 22.6% were vacant. Among occupied housing units, 79.5% were owner-occupied and 20.5% were renter-occupied. The homeowner vacancy rate was 2.1% and the rental vacancy rate was 8.6%.

Hampshire County, West Virginia – Racial and ethnic composition Note: the US Census treats Hispanic/Latino as an ethnic category. This table excludes Latinos from the racial categories and assigns them to a separate category. Hispanics/Latinos may be of any race.
Race / Ethnicity (NH = Non-Hispanic)	Pop 2000	Pop 2010	Pop 2020	% 2000	% 2010	% 2020
White alone (NH)	19,733	23,146	21,655	97.67%	96.58%	93.77%
Black or African American alone (NH)	164	225	178	0.81%	0.93%	0.88%
Native American or Alaska Native alone (NH)	46	49	30	0.22%	0.20%	0.12%
Asian alone (NH)	33	50	61	0.16%	0.20%	0.26%
Pacific Islander alone (NH)	4	15	4	0.01%	0.06%	0.01%
Other race alone (NH)	2	5	74	0.00%	0.02%	0.32%
Mixed race or Multiracial (NH)	109	232	754	0.53%	0.96%	3.26%
Hispanic or Latino (any race)	112	242	337	0.55%	1.00%	1.45%
Total	20,203	23,964	23,093	100.00%	100.00%	100.00%

=== 2020 income and poverty estimates ===
According to data from the United States Census Bureau's data portal, the median income for a household was $50,890 and the poverty rate was 17.9%.

=== 2010 census ===
As of the 2010 United States census, there were 23,964 people, 9,595 households, and 6,606 families residing in the county. The population density was 37.4 inhabitants per square mile (14.4/km^{2}). There were 13,688 housing units at an average density of 21.4 per square mile (8.3/km^{2}). The racial makeup of the county was 97.2% white, 1.0% black or African American, 0.2% Asian, 0.2% American Indian, 0.1% Pacific islander, 0.2% from other races, and 1.1% from two or more races. Those of Hispanic or Latino origin made up 1.0% of the population. In terms of ancestry, 29.0% were German, 12.9% were American, 11.9% were Irish, and 8.0% were English.

Of the 9,595 households, 29.9% had children under the age of 18 living with them, 54.3% were married couples living together, 9.1% had a female householder with no husband present, 31.2% were non-families, and 25.8% of all households were made up of individuals. The average household size was 2.44 and the average family size was 2.91. The median age was 42.6 years.

The median income for a household in the county was $31,792 and the median income for a family was $45,447. Males had a median income of $36,828 versus $25,347 for females. The per capita income for the county was $17,752. About 11.0% of families and 16.4% of the population were below the poverty line, including 20.1% of those under age 18 and 18.2% of those age 65 or over.

=== 2000 census ===
As of the census of 2000, there were 20,203 people, 7,955 households, and 5,640 families residing in the county. The population density was 32 inhabitants per square mile (12/km^{2}). There were 11,185 housing units at an average density of 17 units per square mile (6.6 units/km^{2}). The racial makeup of the county was 98.04% White, 0.83% Black or African American, 0.24% Native American, 0.16% Asian, 0.02% Pacific Islander, 0.12% from other races, and 0.59% from two or more races. 0.55% of the population were Hispanic or Latino of any race.

There were 7,955 households, out of which 31.30% had children under the age of 18 living with them, 56.70% were married couples living together, 9.50% had a female householder with no husband present, and 29.10% were non-families. 24.60% of all households were made up of individuals, and 10.60% had someone living alone who was 65 years of age or older. The average household size was 2.49 and the average family size was 2.94.

In the county, the population was spread out, with 25.10% under the age of 18, 7.10% from 18 to 24, 27.60% from 25 to 44, 25.60% from 45 to 64, and 14.60% who were 65 years of age or older. The median age was 38 years. For every 100 females, there were 99.70 males. For every 100 females age 18 and over, there were 97.30 males.

The median income for a household in the county was $31,666, and the median income for a family was $37,616. Males had a median income of $28,884 versus $19,945 for females. The per capita income for the county was $14,851. About 12.90% of families and 16.30% of the population were below the poverty line, including 22.70% of those under age 18 and 13.10% of those age 65 or over.

== Politics ==
During the Virginia Secession Convention, Hampshire County voted against secession, but much of this vote was within what is now part of heavily Unionist and Republican Mineral County, which was detached from it after the war. Following the detachment of Mineral – which was not to give a Democratic majority before 1936 or after 1976 – Hampshire County became solidly Democratic, not voting for any Republican candidate between 1868 and 1952 inclusive. However, since 1968 Hampshire County has not voted for any Democratic presidential candidate apart from Jimmy Carter in 1976, and since 2000 it has suffered the same drastic declines in Democratic support as the rest of socially conservative West Virginia. Donald Trump won the county by an overwhelming margin in 2016.

United States presidential election results for Hampshire County, West Virginia
Year	Republican		Democratic		Third party(ies)	
Year	No.	%	No.	%	No.	%
1912	406	16.55%	1,777	72.44%	270	11.01%
1916	745	25.37%	2,181	74.28%	10	0.34%
1920	1,214	35.02%	2,221	64.06%	32	0.92%
1924	1,172	27.88%	2,993	71.19%	39	0.93%
1928	1,779	45.31%	2,132	54.30%	15	0.38%
1932	1,258	25.22%	3,681	73.80%	49	0.98%
1936	1,512	28.39%	3,792	71.21%	21	0.39%
1940	1,751	34.82%	3,277	65.18%	0	0.00%
1944	1,638	39.73%	2,485	60.27%	0	0.00%
1948	1,351	36.34%	2,357	63.39%	10	0.27%
1952	2,173	47.61%	2,391	52.39%	0	0.00%
1956	2,676	53.18%	2,356	46.82%	0	0.00%
1960	2,541	47.14%	2,849	52.86%	0	0.00%
1964	1,473	30.35%	3,381	69.65%	0	0.00%
1968	1,959	44.08%	1,791	40.30%	694	15.62%
1972	3,084	65.33%	1,637	34.67%	0	0.00%
1976	2,097	40.32%	3,104	59.68%	0	0.00%
1980	2,879	51.55%	2,522	45.16%	184	3.29%
1984	4,065	65.70%	2,102	33.97%	20	0.32%
1988	3,253	60.66%	2,085	38.88%	25	0.47%
1992	2,767	44.84%	2,365	38.32%	1,039	16.84%
1996	2,814	48.68%	2,335	40.39%	632	10.93%
2000	3,879	63.62%	2,069	33.93%	149	2.44%
2004	5,489	68.65%	2,455	30.70%	52	0.65%
2008	5,222	62.56%	2,983	35.74%	142	1.70%
2012	5,523	68.87%	2,299	28.67%	197	2.46%
2016	6,692	77.11%	1,580	18.20%	407	4.69%
2020	8,033	79.65%	1,939	19.22%	114	1.13%
2024	8,464	80.61%	1,890	18.00%	146	1.39%

== Education ==
=== Public schools ===
- Hampshire County Schools
- West Virginia Schools for the Deaf and Blind

=== Private schools ===
- Maranatha Christian Academy
- Slanesville Christian School

== Parks and recreation ==
=== County parks ===
- Central Hampshire Park, Augusta
- Green Spring Recreational Park, Green Spring
- Hampshire Park & 4-H Camp, Romney
- Romney Recreation Center, Romney
- Shanks Roadside Park, Shanks

=== Wildlife management areas ===
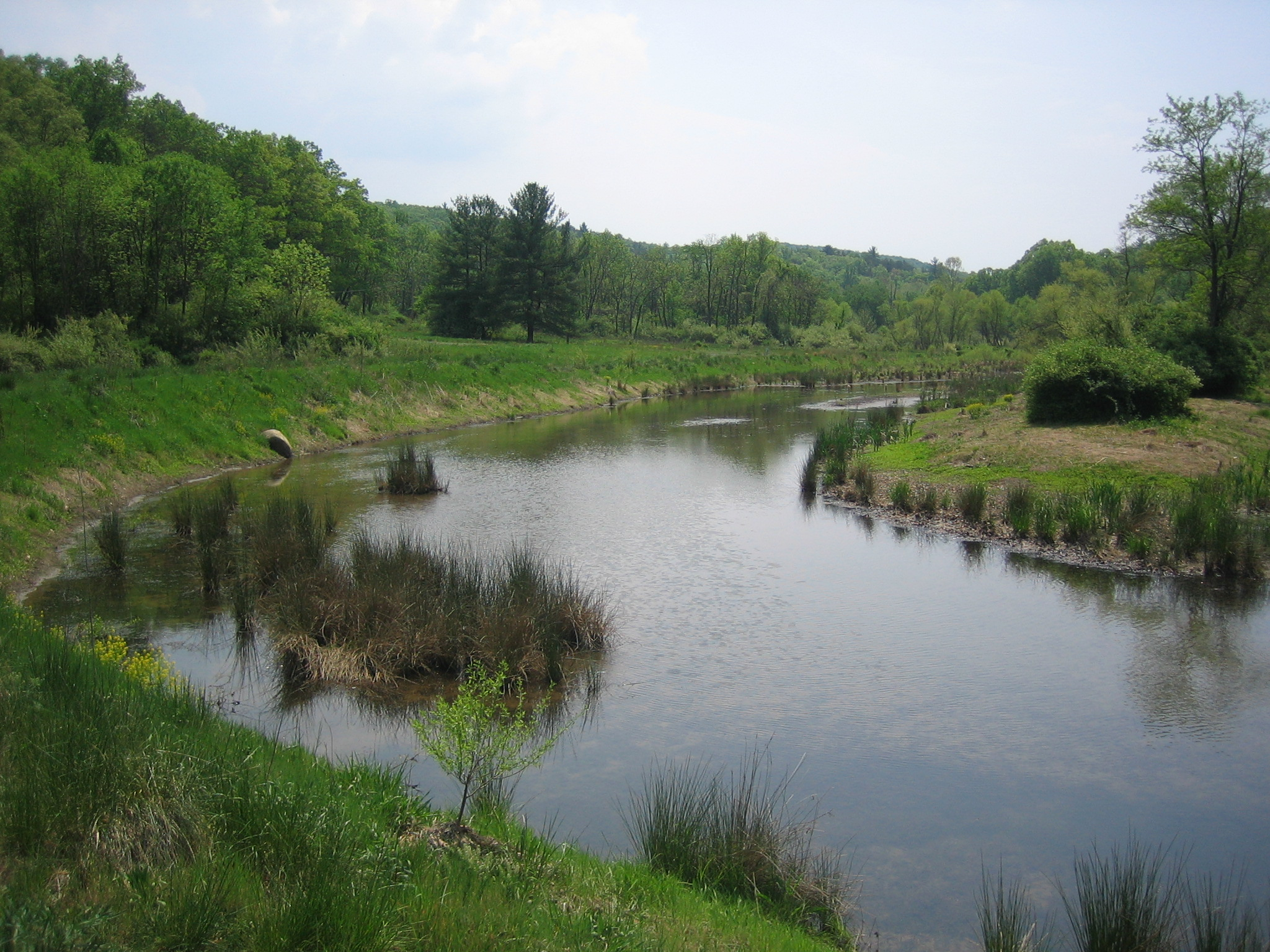
Edwards Run at Edwards Run Wildlife Management Area near Cold Stream.

- Edwards Run Wildlife Management Area
- Fort Mill Ridge Wildlife Management Area
- Nathaniel Mountain Wildlife Management Area
- Short Mountain Wildlife Management Area
- South Branch Wildlife Management Area
- Wardensville Wildlife Management Area

=== National forests ===
- George Washington National Forest

== Communities ==
=== City ===
- Romney

=== Town ===
- Capon Bridge

=== Magisterial districts ===
- Bloomery
- Capon
- Gore
- Mill Creek
- Romney
- Sherman
- Springfield

=== Census-designated places ===
- Green Spring
- Springfield

=== Unincorporated communities ===
- Augusta
- Barnes Mill
- Bloomery
- Blues Beach
- Bubbling Spring
- Capon Lake
- Capon Springs
- Capon Springs Station
- Cold Stream
- Concord
- Creekvale
- Davis Ford
- Delray
- Dillons Run
- Donaldson
- Forks of Cacapon
- Frenchburg
- Glebe
- Good
- Grace
- Hainesville
- Hanging Rock
- Higginsville
- High View
- Hooks Mills
- Hoy
- Intermont
- Jericho
- Junction
- Kirby
- Largent
- Lehew
- Levels
- Little Cacapon
- Loom
- Mechanicsburg
- Millbrook
- Millen
- Milleson
- Neals Run
- Nero
- North River Mills
- Okonoko
- Pancake
- Pin Oak
- Pleasant Dale
- Purgitsville
- Rada
- Raven Rocks
- Ridgedale
- Rio
- Ruckman
- Sector
- Sedan
- Shanks
- Shiloh
- Slanesville
- South Branch Depot
- Three Churches
- Valley
- Vance
- Vanderlip
- Wappocomo
- Woodrow
- Yellow Spring

== Notable people ==
- Jesse B. Aikin, Shape note "singing master"
- Stephen Ailes, U.S. Secretary of the Army
- James Dillon Armstrong, state legislator and circuit court judge
- William Armstrong, U.S. Congressman from Virginia
- John Rinehart Blue, West Virginia House Delegate
- James Caudy, Frontiersman and "Indian fighter"
- William C. Clayton, West Virginia State Senator
- Edna Brady Cornwell, First Lady of West Virginia
- John J. Cornwell, 15th Governor of West Virginia
- Marshall S. Cornwell, Newspaper publisher, poet, and author
- William B. Cornwell, railroad and timber executive
- John Collins Covell, WVSDB principal
- Rick Hillenbrand, West Virginia state representative
- Susan Dew Hoff, physician
- Samuel Lightfoot Flournoy, West Virginia State Senator
- Samuel Lightfoot Flournoy, prominent Charleston lawyer
- William Foreman, Early American military leader
- Henry Bell Gilkeson, West Virginia State Legislator
- Henepola Gunaratana, founder of the Bhavana Society, a monastery and meditation retreat center
- John J. Jacob, 4th Governor of West Virginia
- Howard Hille Johnson, WVSDB founder and educator
- Gabriel Jones, Burgess and Hampshire County Clerk of Court
- Jonah Edward Kelley, Medal of Honor recipient
- Herman G. Kump, 19th Governor of West Virginia
- James Sloan Kuykendall, West Virginia House Delegate
- Charles S. Lawrence, IFT Executive Vice President
- Thomas Bryan Martin, Burgess and Hampshire County judge
- Angus William McDonald, Confederate States Army Colonel
- Cornelia Peake McDonald, American diarist
- Marshall McDonald, United States Fish Commissioner
- Jerry Mezzatesta, West Virginia House Delegate
- Alexander W. Monroe, West Virginia House Speaker
- Ann Pancake, Author
- Chet Pancake, Filmmaker
- Sam Pancake, Actor
- Isaac Parsons (1752–1796), Virginia House Delegate
- Isaac Parsons (1814–1862), Virginia House Delegate
- Lee Hawse Patteson, First Lady of West Virginia
- Ruth Rowan, West Virginia House Delegate
- Mary Ann Shaffer, American writer
- David Shear, Romney mayor and businessperson
- Arthur R. M. Spaid, American educator and writer
- Joseph Sprigg, West Virginia Attorney General
- Richard Stafford, Pioneer
- Howard Llewellyn Swisher, American businessperson, real estate developer, and historian
- Felix Walker, U.S. Congressman from North Carolina
- Alexander White, U.S. Congressman from Virginia
- Christian Streit White, Hampshire County Clerk of Court
- Francis White, U.S. Congressman from Virginia
- John Baker White, Hampshire County Clerk of Court
- John Baker White, West Virginia Board of Control member
- Robert White, West Virginia Attorney General
- Robert White, West Virginia State Senator
- Charles M. Williams, Harvard Business School professor
- Andrew Wodrow, Hampshire County Clerk of Court
- Joshua Soule Zimmerman, West Virginia House Delegate

== See also ==
- Edwards Run Wildlife Management Area
- Fort Mill Ridge Wildlife Management Area
- List of historical highway markers in Hampshire County, West Virginia
- List of placenames in Hampshire County, West Virginia
- Short Mountain Wildlife Management Area
- South Branch Wildlife Management Area
- USS Hampshire County (LST-819)
- National Register of Historic Places listings in Hampshire County, West Virginia

== Bibliography ==
- Brannon, Selden W. (1976). Historic Hampshire: A Symposium of Hampshire County and Its People, Past and Present. Parsons, West Virginia: McClain Printing Company. ISBN 978-0-87012-236-1. OCLC 3121468.
- Federal Writers' Project (1937). Historic Romney 1762–1937. Romney, West Virginia: Federal Writers' Project, The Town Council of Romney, West Virginia. OCLC 2006735.
- Hampshire County Extension Homemakers (1991). Hampshire County, West Virginia: A Pictorial History. Marceline, Missouri: Hampshire County Extension Homemakers, Walsworth Publishing Company. ISBN 978-1-60354-047-6. OCLC 51940415.
- Kercheval, Samuel (1833). A History of the Valley of Virginia. Winchester, Virginia: Samuel H. Davis.
- Maxwell, Hu; Swisher, Howard Llewellyn (1897). History of Hampshire County, West Virginia From Its Earliest Settlement to the Present. Morgantown, West Virginia: A. Brown Boughner, Printer. OCLC 680931891. OL 23304577M.
- Munske, Roberta R.; Kerns, Wilmer L., eds. (2004). Hampshire County, West Virginia, 1754–2004. Romney, West Virginia: The Hampshire County 250th Anniversary Committee. ISBN 978-0-9715738-2-6. OCLC 55983178.
