= Nathaniel Mountain Wildlife Management Area =

State Wildlife Management Area in Hampshire County, West Virginia

- IUCN category IV (habitat/species management area)
- Location within West Virginia
- Location: Hampshire, West Virginia, United States
- Coordinates: 39°13′21″N 78°47′28″W
- Area: 10,675 acres (43.20 km^{2})
- Elevation: 1,922 ft (586 m)
- Website: WVDNR District 2 Wildlife Management Areas

Nathaniel Mountain Wildlife Management Area is located on 10,675 acres (43.20 km^{2}) south of Romney in Hampshire County, West Virginia. The wildlife management area's principle access road is off Grassy Lick Road (County Route 10). Nathaniel Mountain is owned by the West Virginia Division of Natural Resources (WVDNR), and is one of West Virginia's largest wildlife management areas. The WMA was expanded in November 2003 after the WVDNR purchased 1,800 acres (7.3 km^{2}) from the MeadWestvaco Corporation.

Nathaniel Mountain WMA is made up of three major mountains: Nathaniel Mountain (2,739 feet [835 m]), Piney Mountain (2,618 feet [798 m]), and South Branch Mountain (3,028 feet [923 m]). The WMA's forests are primarily dominated by mature species of oak, hickory, and Virginia pine. White-tailed deer, turkey, grouse, squirrel, and black bears are available for hunting.

Mill Run, a steep mountain stream that meanders through a seven-mile (11 km) course to join the South Branch Potomac River, is also located in the Nathaniel Mountain WMA.

== See also ==
- Animal conservation
- Fishing
- Hunting
- List of West Virginia wildlife management areas
