= Dillons Run, West Virginia =

Unincorporated community in West Virginia, United States

- Unincorporated community
- Location within West Virginia Location within the United States
- Coordinates: 39°14′10″N 78°30′49″W
- Country: United States
- State: West Virginia
- County: Hampshire
- Time zone: UTC-5 (Eastern (EST))
  - Summer (DST): UTC-4 (EDT)
- GNIS feature ID: 1556760

Dillons Run was an unincorporated community in Hampshire County, West Virginia, United States. It is located at the intersection of Dillons Run Road (West Virginia Secondary Route 50/25) and Haines Road along the Dillons Run stream from which it takes its name. Dillons Run no longer has its own post office in operation. It was originally known as Luptons Mill.
