= Pinnacle Ridge =

- Location within Wyoming Location within the United States

Highest point
- Elevation: 13,365 ft (4,074 m)
- Prominence: 325 ft (99 m)
- Coordinates: 43°10′24″N 109°39′16″W

Geography
- Location: Fremont / Sublette counties, Wyoming, U.S.
- Parent range: Wind River Range
- Topo map: USGS Gannett Peak

Geology
- Mountain type: Arête

Climbing
- First ascent: 1933 H.H. Bliss, Paul Petzoldt

Pinnacle Ridge (13,365 ft (4,074 m)) is located in the Wind River Range in the U.S. state of Wyoming. Pinnacle Ridge is an arête and the highest point on that ridge is the 14th highest summit in Wyoming, about equidistant from Gannett Peak to the north and Mount Woodrow Wilson to the south. The summit is on the Continental Divide in both Shoshone and Bridger-Teton National Forests. The Dinwoody Glacier is on the eastern slopes of Pinnacle Ridge.
