= South Branch Mountain =

Mountain in the U.S. state of West Virginia

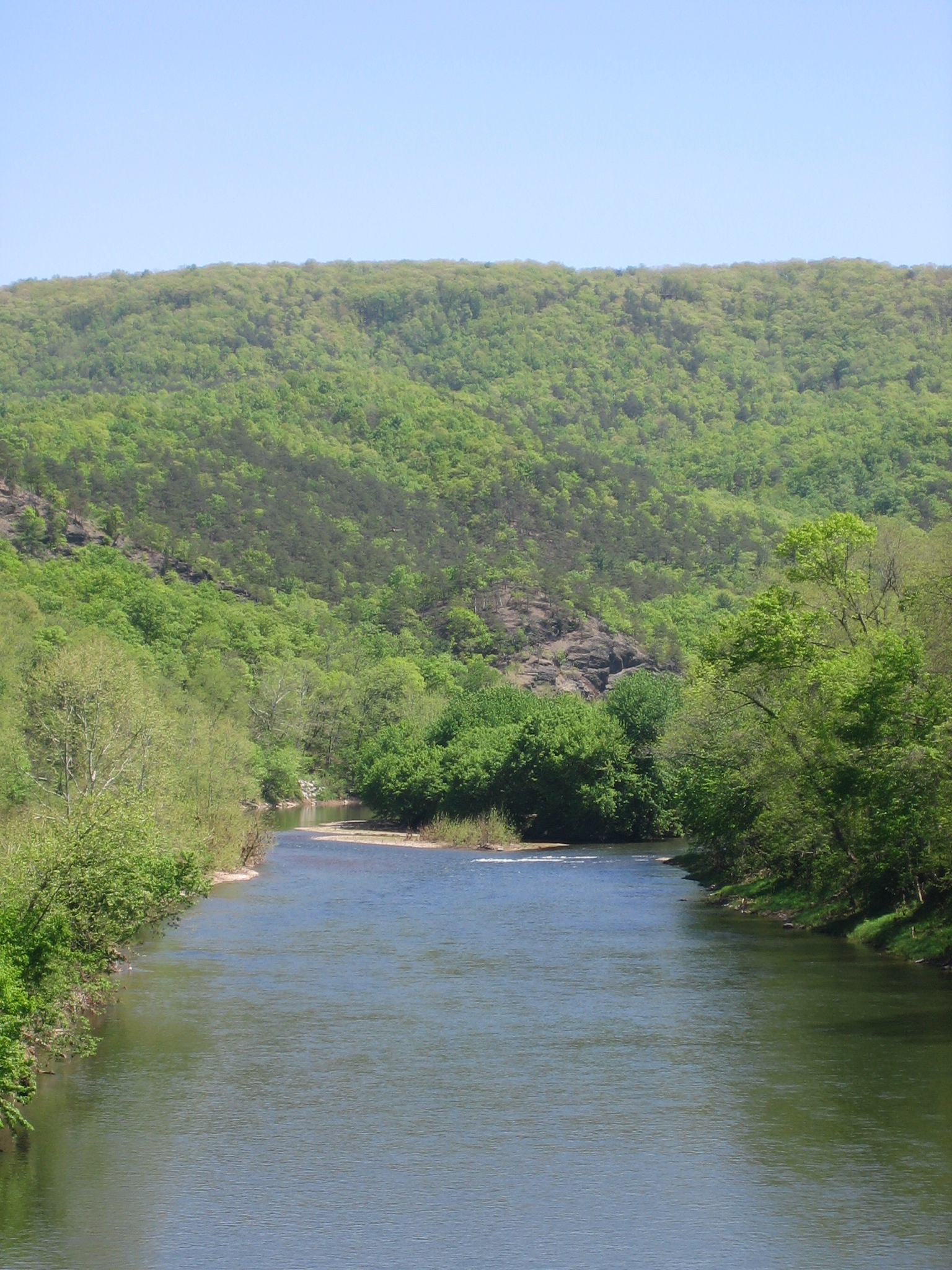
- South Branch Mountain viewed at its northern end from Millesons Mill, West Virginia.

Highest point
- Elevation: 3,028 ft (923 m)
- Coordinates: 39°11′39″N 78°47′45″W

Geography
- Location: Hampshire / Hardy counties, West Virginia, U.S.
- Parent range: Ridge-and-Valley Appalachians
- Topo map(s): USGS Sector, Springfield

Climbing
- Easiest route: Drive

South Branch Mountain is a mountain ridge that runs southwest to northeast through Hampshire and Hardy counties in the Eastern Panhandle of the U.S. state of West Virginia, rising to its greatest elevation of 3,028 feet (923 m) above sea-level in the Nathaniel Mountain Wildlife Management Area. South Branch Mountain is among the largest and most prominent of the mountains in the Ridge-and-valley Appalachians of the Eastern Panhandle region. It forms the eastern edge of the South Branch Potomac River Valley from Springfield to Moorefield. The mountain was originally named Jersey Mountain by colonial settlers in the eighteenth century after Jersey.

The Northwestern Turnpike (U.S. Route 50) climbs South Branch Mountain between Shanks and Romney in an area known as Sunrise Summit. The forested wetlands that were once located here on the mountain's top were destroyed by the expansive commercial and residential developments in the Sunrise Summit area along US 50. Further south near Moorefield, the construction of Corridor H has caused increased disruption to South Branch Mountain's forests, habitats, and topography.
