= Samuel Kercheval =

American lawyer & author (1767–1845)

Samuel Kercheval (March 1767 in Frederick County, Virginia – November 14, 1845, in Middletown, Virginia) was a Virginia lawyer and author. His A History of the Valley of Virginia (1st edition, 1833) provides important primary information on the earliest European settlements of the Shenandoah Valley and South Branch Potomac River and their encounters with local Indians.

== Biography ==
Kercheval married Susannah Chinn on September 23, 1787.

The Kerchevals were Huguenots and the name means Horse Hearted. Cheval is the French word for horse, Ker is an archaic form of Coeur or heart.

As a member of the Order of the Cincinnati, Kercheval received title to properties in Maysville, Kentucky, on the Ohio River. Jefferson, in his tour of the "French Properties", stopped to visit with Sam and his son Ben. Ben later moved on to Detroit. Kercheval Avenue, which extends from Detroit into Grosse Pointe and is the main shopping area there is named in their honor. The grave in Detroit's historic Elmwood Cemetery has disappeared.

They were Freemasons adhering to the teaching of the metaphors of geometry.

== Correspondence with Jefferson and Madison ==
Kercheval corresponded with Thomas Jefferson and James Madison. A letter from Jefferson to Kercheval contains an eloquent argument against fossilizing the constitution, arguing against treating, "constitutions with sanctimonious reverence, and deem them like the arc of the covenant, too sacred to be touched." The inscription carved on the wall at the Jefferson Memorial behind Jefferson's right hand used the metaphor of a man still wearing the coat which fitted him when he was a boy.

Jefferson wrote at least three letters to Kercheval in reply to his concerns. One was about a political pamphlet. One was to a request for a donation to the Kentucky Military Academy, in which he replied that if he met every such request he would be destitute, and that he preferred to give where he could oversee the results. The third letter details Jefferson's prejudices, how the responsibilities of civic affairs were subdivided, and the proper interpretation of the Constitution. Ward republics are discussed in the letters.

== A History of the Valley of Virginia ==
His Valley of Virginia was so popular that the first edition was soon exhausted. He died before the second edition came out. He lived at the time of his death at "Harmony Hall" between Strasburg and Middletown.

- First edition, 1833: Winchester, Virginia: Samuel H. Davis; 486 pgs.
- Second edition, 1850 ("Revised and Extended by the Author"): Woodstock, Virginia: John Gatewood, Printer.
- Third edition, 1902: W.N. Grabill, Power Press.
- Fourth edition, 1925; with notes by Oren F. Morton.
