= Timber Ridge =

Mountain in the U.S. states of Virginia and West Virginia

Highest point
- Elevation: 413 m (1,355 ft)
- Coordinates: 39°21′55″N 78°19′48″W

Geography
- Location: Virginia and West Virginia, U.S.
- Parent range: Ridge-and-Valley Appalachians
- Topo map(s): USGS Gore, Capon Springs, Ridge, Great Cacapon

Climbing
- Easiest route: Drive

Timber Ridge is a mountain ridge of the Ridge-and-valley Appalachians straddling the U.S. states of Virginia and West Virginia. Timber Ridge extends from the forks of Sleepy Creek at Stotlers Crossroads in Morgan County, West Virginia, to Lehew in Hampshire County, West Virginia. The ridge is predominantly forested, as its name suggests, with the exception of a number of orchards and open fields. From WV 127/VA 127 at Good to Lehew, Timber Ridge serves as the boundary line between Hampshire County, West Virginia, and Frederick County, Virginia.

== Summits and knobs ==
Although Timber Ridge is a continuous mountain ridge, it is made up of a number of summits and knobs with individual names. These include:

- Chine Spring Knob, 1,312 feet (400 m)
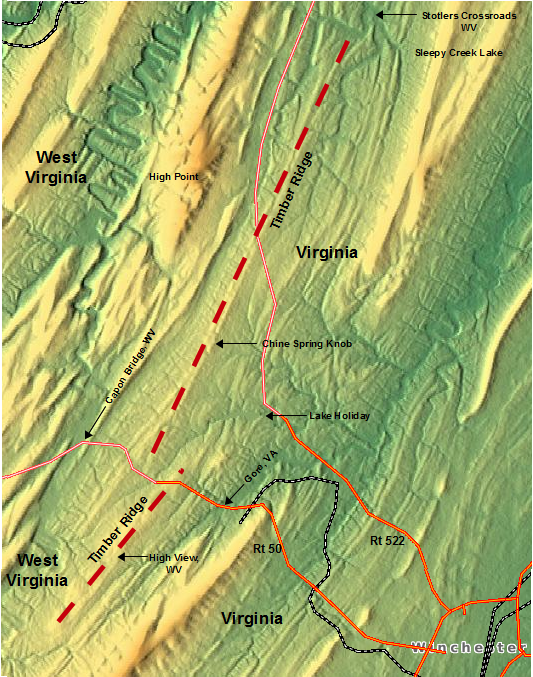
Timber Ridge is marked by the red dashed lines

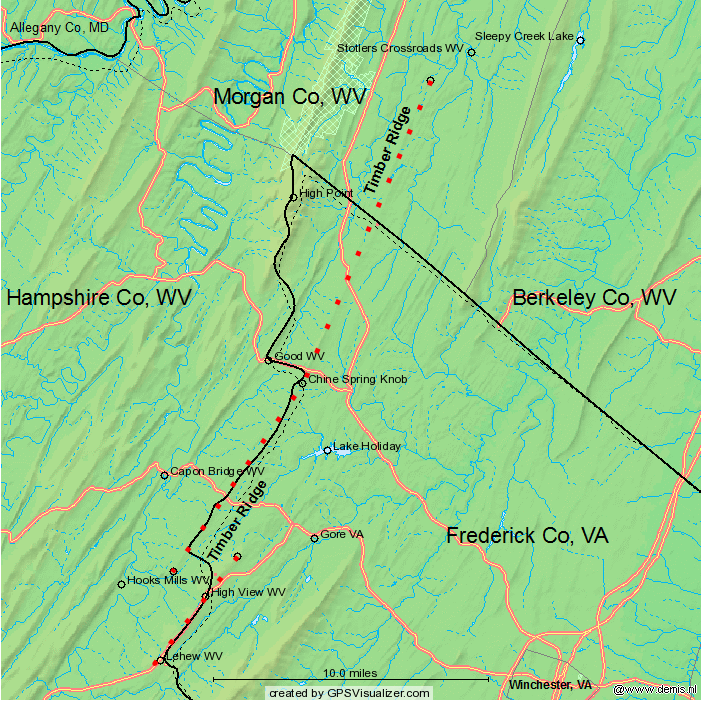
Timber Ridge is marked by the red dashed lines
