= Lehew, West Virginia =

- Unincorporated community
- Location within West Virginia Location within the United States
- Coordinates: 39°11′57″N 78°26′17″W
- Country: United States
- State: West Virginia
- County: Hampshire
- Time zone: UTC-5 (Eastern (EST))
  - Summer (DST): UTC-4 (EDT)
- GNIS feature ID: 1551778

Lehew is an unincorporated community in Hampshire County, West Virginia, United States on the Virginia state line. Lehew is located on Timber Ridge along West Virginia Route 259 at its crossroads with H.G. Brill Road (County Route 23/4) and White Pine Ridge Road (County Route 23/12).

The community most likely was named after an early settler.

== Historic sites ==
- Capon School, WV 259
- Shiloh United Methodist Church, WV 259
