= National Register of Historic Places listings in Hampshire County, West Virginia =

Location of Hampshire County in West Virginia

This is a list of the National Register of Historic Places listings in Hampshire County, West Virginia.

This is intended to be a complete list of the properties and districts on the National Register of Historic Places in Hampshire County, West Virginia, United States. The locations of National Register properties and districts for which the latitude and longitude coordinates are included below, may be seen in an online map.

There are 30 properties and districts listed on the National Register in the county.

This National Park Service list is complete through NPS recent listings posted March 6, 2026.

Contents: Counties in West Virginia

Barbour - Berkeley - Boone - Braxton - Brooke - Cabell - Calhoun - Clay - Doddridge - Fayette - Gilmer - Grant - Greenbrier - Hampshire - Hancock - Hardy - Harrison - Jackson - Jefferson - Kanawha - Lewis - Lincoln - Logan - Marion - Marshall - Mason - McDowell - Mercer - Mineral - Mingo - Monongalia - Monroe - Morgan - Nicholas - Ohio - Pendleton - Pleasants - Pocahontas - Preston - Putnam - Raleigh - Randolph - Ritchie - Roane - Summers - Taylor - Tucker - Tyler - Upshur - Wayne - Webster - Wetzel - Wirt - Wood - Wyoming

== Current listings ==
| | Name on the Register | Image | Date listed | Location | City or town | Description |
|---|---|---|---|---|---|---|
| 1 | The Brill Octagon House | The Brill Octagon House | May 31, 2016 (#16000313) | Capon Springs and McIlwee Rds. 39°08′16″N 78°29′27″W | Capon Springs | |
| 2 | The Capon Bridge | The Capon Bridge | January 9, 2026 (#100012524) | US Route 50 over the Cacapon River; 39°17′52″N 78°26′05″W | Capon Bridge | |
| 3 | Capon Chapel | Capon Chapel | December 12, 2012 (#12001048) | Christian Church Rd. 39°16′12″N 78°26′39″W | Capon Bridge | |
| 4 | Capon Springs | Capon Springs | November 12, 1993 (#93001228) | Capon Springs Rd. (County Route 16); 39°07′56″N 78°28′46″W | Capon Springs | |
| 5 | Fort Mill Ridge Civil War Trenches | Fort Mill Ridge Civil War Trenches | January 22, 2014 (#13001121) | Fort Mill Ridge Rd. 39°19′28″N 78°47′37″W | Romney | |
| 6 | Fort Van Meter | Fort Van Meter | December 30, 2009 (#09001191) | River Road; 39°14′10″N 78°50′30″W | Romney | |
| 7 | French's Mill | French's Mill | December 16, 2014 (#14001056) | Augusta-Ford Hill Rd. 39°17′38″N 78°38′12″W | Augusta | |
| 8 | Hampshire County Courthouse | Hampshire County Courthouse | September 7, 2005 (#05001006) | 66 N. High St. 39°20′32″N 78°45′22″W | Romney | |
| 9 | Hebron Church | Hebron Church | December 16, 2014 (#14001057) | 10851 Carper's Pike; 39°09′03″N 78°32′32″W | Yellow Spring | |
| 10 | Hickory Grove | Hickory Grove | August 18, 2011 (#11000556) | County Route 8, 1 mile (1.6 km) south of U.S. Route 50; 39°19′31″N 78°46′51″W | Romney | |
| 11 | Hook's Tavern | Hook's Tavern | April 29, 2011 (#11000260) | Junction of U.S. Route 50 and Smokey Hollow Rd. 39°18′03″N 78°24′51″W | Capon Bridge | |
| 12 | Kuykendall Polygonal Barn | Kuykendall Polygonal Barn | July 9, 1985 (#85001549) | River Road; 39°14′07″N 78°50′36″W | Romney | |
| 13 | Nathaniel and Isaac Kuykendall House | Nathaniel and Isaac Kuykendall House | December 16, 2014 (#14001058) | Address Restricted | Romney | |
| 14 | Literary Hall | Literary Hall | May 29, 1979 (#79002577) | Main and High Sts. 39°20′32″N 78°45′24″W | Romney | |
| 15 | North River Mills Historic District | North River Mills Historic District | May 4, 2011 (#11000261) | Junction of County Roads 45/20 and 4/2; 39°20′11″N 78°30′12″W | North River Mills | |
| 16 | Old District Parsonage | Old District Parsonage | May 5, 2005 (#05000398) | 351 N. High St. 39°20′43″N 78°45′19″W | Romney | |
| 17 | Old Pine Church | Old Pine Church | December 12, 2012 (#12001049) | Old Pine Church Rd. 39°12′55″N 78°55′33″W | Purgitsville | |
| 18 | Pin Oak Fountain | Pin Oak Fountain | May 31, 2016 (#16000314) | WV 29 and Falconwood Rd. 39°26′20″N 78°27′07″W | Pin Oak | |
| 19 | Capt. David Pugh House | | August 25, 2004 (#04000913) | County Route 14 at County Route 23/4; 39°14′39″N 78°27′47″W | Hooks Mills | |
| 20 | Romney Historic District | | March 9, 2026 (#100012789) | Main St., N. Antigo Pl., Marathon Pl., Charlevoix Pl, Sioux Ln. 39°20′32″N 78°45′27″W | Romney | |
| 21 | Scanlon Farm | Scanlon Farm | February 3, 1988 (#87002521) | Three Churches Run Rd. 39°23′56″N 78°38′46″W | Three Churches | |
| 22 | Sloan-Parker House | Sloan-Parker House | June 5, 1975 (#75001892) | East of Junction on U.S. Route 50; 39°18′48″N 78°50′56″W | Junction | |
| 23 | Capon Lake Whipple Truss Bridge | Capon Lake Whipple Truss Bridge | December 15, 2011 (#11000929) | WV 259 north of its junction with County Route 16; 39°09′28″N 78°32′13″W | Capon Lake | |
| 24 | Springfield Brick House | | January 2, 2013 (#12001141) | 12 Market St. 39°27′04″N 78°41′42″W | Springfield | |
| 25 | Sycamore Dale | Sycamore Dale | December 2, 1980 (#80004021) | West of Romney off County Route 8; 39°20′15″N 78°46′24″W | Romney | |
| 26 | Valley View | Valley View | December 12, 2012 (#12001050) | Depot Valley Rd. 39°21′21″N 78°45′36″W | Romney | |
| 27 | Washington Bottom Farm | Washington Bottom Farm | November 29, 2001 (#01001328) | WV 28; 39°24′49″N 78°44′19″W | Springfield | |
| 28 | West Virginia Schools for the Deaf and the Blind Dairy Barn | | April 15, 2022 (#100007605) | 199 Depot St. 39°20′55″N 78°45′24″W | Romney | |
| 29 | Wilson-Wodrow-Mytinger House | Wilson-Wodrow-Mytinger House | August 22, 1977 (#77001375) | 51 W. Gravel Ln. 39°20′29″N 78°45′27″W | Romney | |
| 30 | Yellow Spring Mill | Yellow Spring Mill | December 16, 2014 (#14001059) | Junction of WV 259 and Cacapon River Rd. 39°10′57″N 78°30′36″W | Yellow Spring | |

== See also ==
- List of historic sites in Hampshire County, West Virginia
- List of National Historic Landmarks in West Virginia
- National Register of Historic Places listings in West Virginia
