= List of historic sites in Hampshire County, West Virginia =

This is a list of historic sites in Hampshire County in the U.S. state of West Virginia.

== Key ==
†	Denotes site listed on the National Register of Historic Places
‡	Denotes site is a contributing property to a listing on the National Register of Historic Places

== Historic sites ==
Site	Image	Year built	Address	Community
41 East Main Street	41 East Main Street	19th century	41 East Main Street	Romney
63 Springfield Pike	63 Springfield Pike	1860	63 Springfield Pike	Springfield
75 North High Street		1909	75 North High Street	Romney
148 North Marsham Street		1910	148 North Marsham Street	Romney
169 East Main Street	169 East Main Street	19th century	169 East Main Street	Romney
193 East Main Street	193 East Main Street	19th century	193 East Main Street	Romney
229 East Main Street	229 East Main Street	late 18th century	229 East Main Street	Romney
3121 Northwestern Pike	3121 Northwestern Pike	19th century	3121 Northwestern Pike	Capon Bridge
Alpine Building		1860	4 East Main Street	Romney
Arnold House		1770	South Branch River Road (CR 8)	Romney
George S. Arnold House	George Arnold House		North Antigo Place	Romney
Ashbrook		1834	2961 Cumberland Road	Vance
Old Bank of Romney Building	Old Bank of Romney Building	1906	96 East Main Street	Romney
Hartford Bealer House		19th century		Capon Bridge
The Bee Hive		1880	Bolton Street & Rosemary Lane	Romney
Bethel Baptist Church		established 1872	Rock Oak Road (CR 10/6)	Kirby
Old Bethel Church and Cemetery	Old Bethel Church and Cemetery	1842	Bethel Church Road (CR 10/2)	Romney
Bethel United Methodist Church and Cemetery	Bethel United Methodist Church and Cemetery		Spring Gap-Neals Run Road (CR 2)	Neals Run
Bethesda Presbyterian Church		1894	South Branch River Road (CR 8)	Romney
Bloomery Grist Mill		c. 1800	Bloomery Pike (WV 127)	Bloomery
Bloomery Iron Furnace	Bloomery Iron Furnace	c. 1800	Bloomery Pike (WV 127)	Bloomery
Bloomery Presbyterian Church	Bloomery Presbyterian Church	1825	Bloomery Pike (WV 127)	Bloomery
Bloomery School			Bloomery Pike (WV 127)	Bloomery
Blue House	Blue House	1900	261 East Main Street	Romney
Boxwood	Boxwood	1870	287 East Main Street	Romney
Branch Mountain United Methodist Church and Cemetery	Branch Mountain United Methodist Church and Cemetery		Jersey Mountain Road (CR 5)	Three Churches
Isaac Brill House (Chimneystone)		1830–1847	Milk Road (CR 23/1)	Capon Springs
Buffalo House at Fern Cliff		early 19th century	South Branch River Road (CR 8)	Romney
The Burg	The Burg	c. 1769	Northwestern Pike (U.S. Route 50)	Mechanicsburg
Old Capon Bridge Christian Church	Old Capon Bridge Christian Church		Cacapon River Road (CR 14)	Capon Bridge
Old Capon Bridge Presbyterian Church	Old Capon Bridge Presbyterian Church		Northwestern Pike (U.S. Route 50)	Capon Bridge
Capon Chapel and Cemetery†	Capon Chapel and Cemetery	c. 1852	Christian Church Road (CR 13)	Capon Bridge
Capon Lake Whipple Truss Bridge†	Whipple Truss	1874	State Route 259 (WV 259)	Capon Lake
Capon School	Capon School		State Route 259 (WV 259)	Lehew
Capon Springs Resort†	Capon Springs Resort	mid-18th century, early 19th century	Capon Springs Road (CR 16)	Capon Springs
Capon Springs School	Capon Springs School	mid-19th century	Capon Springs Road (CR 16)	Capon Springs
James Caudy Gravesite		18th century	Christian Church Road (CR 13)	Capon Bridge
Cedar Grove (Ephraim Herriott House)	Cedar Grove		South Branch Potomac River	
Central United Methodist Church and Cemetery	Central United Methodist Church and Cemetery	c. 1900	Northwestern Pike (U.S. Route 50)	Loom
Asa Cline House		early 19th century	State Route 259 (WV 259)	Yellow Spring
Coca-Cola Bottling Plant	Coca-Cola Bottling Plant		426 East Main Street (US 50)	Romney
Cooper Mountain Stone Fountain		unknown	Northwestern Pike (U.S. Route 50)	Capon Bridge
Confederate Memorial	First Confederate Memorial	1867	Indian Mound Cemetery	Romney
John J. Cornwell House	John J. Cornwell House	early 20th century	230 East Main Street	Romney
Old County Poor Farm		late 18th century	South Branch River Road (CR 8)	Glebe
Cox's Store	Cox's Store	c. 1864	Grassy Lick Road (CR 10)	Kirby
Croston House‡	Audra Croston House	c. 1840	Cold Stream Road (CR 45/20)	North River Mills
Davis History House	Davis History House	1798	197 West Main Street	Romney
Ebenezer United Methodist Church and Cemetery	Ebenezer United Methodist Church	1907	22396 Northwestern Pike	Sunrise Summit
Fawcett House (Old Stone House)		1870s	Bloomery Pike (WV 127)	Bloomery
Ferndale		1834		Springfield
Old Forks of Capon Post Office and General Store			Gaston Road (CR 45/7)	Forks of Cacapon
Fort Mill Ridge Civil War Trenches†	Fort Mill Ridge Civil War Trenches	1861–1862	Fort Mill Ridge Road	Romney
Fort Van Meter†	Fort Van Meter	c. 1754	South Branch River Road (CR 8)	Romney
Fox's Hollow Baptist Church			Fox Hollow Road (CR 50/4)	Mechanicsburg
French's Mill†	French's Mill	1911	Augusta-Ford Hill Road (CR 7)	Augusta
Frye's Inn	Frye's Inn	1800–1818	Northwestern Pike (U.S. Route 50)	Capon Bridge
Ginevan Cemetery	Ginevan Cemetery		Okonoko-Little Cacapon Road (CR 2/7)	Little Cacapon
Green Meadows		c. 1900	Northwestern Pike (U.S. Route 50)	Romney
Green Palm Restaurant Building	Green Palm Restaurant Building	before 1853	West Main Street (US 50)	Romney
Green Spring Community Building	Green Spring Community Building	1900	Monroe Street	Green Spring
Green Spring School	Green Spring School		Norton Street	Green Spring
Green Spring Train Station		c. 1882-1885		Green Spring
Old Hampshire Club (Peterkin Conference Center Main Building)			Club House Road (CR 8/1)	Romney
Hampshire County Courthouse†	Hampshire County Courthouse	1922	East Main Street (US 50) at North High Street (WV 28)	Romney
Hampshire County Courthouse Annex‡	Hampshire County Courthouse Annex	1934	North High Street (WV 28)	Romney
Old Hampshire County Sheriff's Residence and Jail‡	Old Hampshire County Sheriff's Residence and Jail	c. 1800 and c. 1850	North High Street (WV 28)	Romney
Hampshire House 1884		1884	165 North Grafton Street	Romney
Hatch House		c. 1750	Smokey Hollow Road (CR 6)	Bloomery
Hebron Church†	Old Hebron Lutheran Church	1849	WV 259	Intermont
Heffelbower Estate		early 20th century	Cacapon River	Capon Bridge
Hickory Grove†		1838	South Branch River Road (CR 8)	Romney
Hiett House‡	Hiett Log House	c. 1770	Cold Stream Road (CR 45/20)	North River Mills
Hooks Tavern†	Hooks Tavern	1790	Northwestern Pike (U.S. Route 50)	Capon Bridge
Hott's Chapel	Hott's Chapel		Grassy Lick Road (CR 10)	Kirby
Houser's Tourist Court			Northwestern Pike (U.S. Route 50)	Romney
Hoy Grade School				Hoy
Indian Mound Cemetery	Indian Mound Cemetery		685 West Main Street (US 50)	Romney
Island Hill United Methodist Church			State Route 29 (WV 29)	Forks of Cacapon
Abraham Kackley House	Abraham Kackley House	c. 1800	Northwestern Pike (U.S. Route 50)	Capon Bridge
Kerns House	Kerns House	c. 1780	154 East Main Street	Romney
Kump House‡		c. 1805	Cold Stream Road (CR 45/20)	North River Mills
Nathaniel and Isaac Kuykendall House†	Kuykendall house	1789		Romney
Kuykendall-Hicks House		mid-18th century	South Branch River Road (CR 8)	Romney
Lee Combs House			Northwestern Pike (U.S. Route 50)	Augusta
Levels United Methodist Church	Levels United Methodist Church		Jersey Mountain Road (CR 5)	Levels
Liberty Hall	Liberty Hall	1858	276 East Main Street (US 50)	Romney
Literary Hall†	Literary Hall	1870	West Main Street at North High Street	Romney
Little Cacapon Church			Little Cacapon River Road (CR 50/9)	Frenchburg
Malick Church and Cemetery	Malick Church and Cemetery		Hoy Road (CR 45/13)	Slanesville
Marvin Chapel United Methodist Church	Marvin Chapel United Methodist Church	1895	US 220	Purgitsville
Old Methodist District Parsonage†	Old Methodist District Parsonage	c. 1868-1882	351 North High Street (WV 28)	Romney
Mill Meadow		mid-19th century	Northwestern Pike (U.S. Route 50)	Romney
Miller House‡		c. 1790	Cold Stream Road (CR 45/20)	North River Mills
Monroe Cemetery		18th century	Christian Church Road (CR 13)	Capon Bridge
Moreland House‡		c. 1880	Cold Stream Road (CR 45/20)	North River Mills
Moss Rock Inn	Moss Rock Inn	c. 1854	Cacapon River Road (CR 14)	Capon Bridge
Mount Bethel Church	Mount Bethel Church	1837	Jersey Mountain Road (CR 5)	Three Churches
Mount Bethel Primitive Baptist Church and Cemetery	Mount Bethel Primitive Baptist Church and Cemetery		Jersey Mountain Road (CR 5)	Three Churches
Mount Pisgah Benevolence Cemetery	Mount Pisgah Benevolence Cemetery		Northwestern Pike (U.S. Route 50)	Romney
Mount Pisgah United Methodist Church		1886	North High Street (WV 28)	Romney
Mount Union Christian Church		late 19th century	Bloomery Pike (WV 29)	Slanesville
Mount Zion United Methodist Church and Cemetery	Mount Zion United Methodist Church and Cemetery	1898	Augusta-Ford Hill Road (CR 7)	Augusta
National Building	National Building	early 20th century	West Main & South High Streets	Romney
North River Mills Grocery‡	North River Mills Grocery	c.1810/c.1920	Cold Stream Road (CR 45/20)	North River Mills
North River Mills Historic District†		mid-18th century - early-20th century	Cold Stream Road (CR 45/20) & North River Road (CR 4/2)	North River Mills
North River Mills School‡		c. 1880	Cold Stream Road (CR 45/20)	North River Mills
North River Mills United Methodist Church‡	North River Mills United Methodist Church	c. 1893	Cold Stream Road (CR 45/20)	North River Mills
Octagon House†	Octagon House	1890	Capon Springs Road (CR 16)	Capon Springs
Old Pine Church and Cemetery†	Old Pine Church and Cemetery	1838	Old Pine Church Road (CR 220/15)	Purgitsville
Otterbein United Methodist Church	Otterbein United Methodist Church	1890	Norton Street	Green Spring
Effie Pancake House	Effie Pancake House	1880	North Antigo Place & East Main Street (US 50)	Romney
Pancake Schoolhouse		late 19th century	South Branch River Road (CR 8)	Romney
Pancake-Kuykendall House (Riverview Farm)		1872	South Branch River Road (CR 8)	Romney
Parker School		1885		Springfield
Parker-Scanlon House (Little Meadows)		19th century	South Branch River Road (CR 8)	Romney
Parsons Bell Tower	Parsons Bell Tower	1925	Indian Mound Cemetery	Romney
Pin Oak Fountain†	Pin Oak Fountain	1932	State Route 29 (WV 29)	Pin Oak
Potomac Academy Building	Potomac Academy Building	1850	West Virginia Schools for the Deaf and Blind Campus	Romney
Amos L. Pugh Home		1885	Northwestern Pike (U.S. Route 50)	Capon Bridge
Captain David Pugh House†		1835	Cacapon River Road (CR 14)	Hooks Mills
Red House (Franklin Herriot House)	Red House House		South Branch Potomac River	
Old Red Store	Old Red Store		Capon Springs (CR 16) & McIlwee (CR 16/1) Roads	Capon Springs
Richards-Mowery House		c. 1850	Delray Road (WV 29)	Delray
Ridgedale (Washington Bottom Farm)†		c. 1835	651 Washington Bottom Road	Ridgedale
The Rocks		c. 1860s	3753 Cumberland Road	Wappocomo
Romney Classical Institute (WVSDB Administration Building)	Romney Classical Institute	1846	301 East Main Street	Romney
Romney First United Methodist Church	Romney First United Methodist Church	1904	49 North High Street (WV 28)	Romney
Romney Presbyterian Church	Romney Presbyterian Church	1860	100 West Rosemary Lane	Romney
Romney Seventh-day Adventist Church (Old Fairview United Methodist Church)	Romney Seventh-day Adventist Church	1915	Grassy Lick Road (CR 10)	Romney
Saint Luke's Presbyterian Chapel	Saint Luke's Presbyterian Chapel	1896	South Branch River Road (CR 8)	Glebe
Saint Stephen's Episcopal Church		1885	310 East Main Street	Romney
Saint Stephen's Episcopal Parsonage			332 East Main Street	Romney
Salem United Methodist Church and Cemetery	Salem United Methodist Church		Slanesville Pike (CR 3)	Slanesville
Scanlon Log House†	Scanlon Log House	late 19th century	Three Churches Hollow Road (CR 5/4)	Three Churches
Old School House		1825	176 South Grafton Street	Romney
Old Shanks Store and Post Office	Old Shanks Store and Post Office	c. 1900	Northwestern Pike (U.S. Route 50)	Shanks
Sherrard's Inn			Bloomery Pike (WV 127)	Bloomery
Shiloh United Methodist Church and Cemetery	Shiloh United Methodist Church		State Route 259 (WV 259)	Lehew
Slanesville Presbyterian Church	Slanesville Presbyterian Church	1910	Slanesville Pike (CR 3)	Slanesville
Sloan–Parker House (Old Stone House)†	Sloan–Parker House	1790	Northwestern Pike (U.S. Route 50)	Junction
Sommerville House		1830	Bloomery Pike (WV 127)	Bloomery
Springfield Brick House†		19th century	12 Market Street	Springfield
Springfield United Methodist Church	Springfield United Methodist Church	1851	25 Vine Street	Springfield
Stony Lonesome		mid-19th century	Northwestern Pike (U.S. Route 50)	Romney
Sycamore Dale (Gibson-Wirgman-Williams House)†		1836	South Branch River Road (CR 8)	Romney
Taggart Hall	Taggart Hall	late 1790s	West Gravel Lane & South High Street	Romney
Timber Ridge Christian Church and Cemetery	Timber Ridge Christian Church and Cemetery	1875	Christian Church Road (CR 13)	High View
Union Church	Union Church		Northwestern Pike (U.S. Route 50)	Augusta
Valley View†	Valley View	1855	Depot Valley Road	Romney
Veterans of Foreign Wars Building	Veterans of Foreign Wars Building	mid 20th century	36 North Marsham Street	Romney
Walnut Grove One-Room School		late 19th century		Yellow Spring
Wappocomo	Wappocomo	1774	State Route 28 (WV 28)	Romney
Washington Place (William Washington Home)	Washington Place	1863–1874	386 Cumberland Road	Romney
Wesley Chapel United Methodist Church and Cemetery	Wesley Chapel United Methodist Church and Cemetery	1876	Jersey Mountain Road (CR 5)	Levels
Old West Virginia Schools for the Deaf and Blind Barn Complex			Depot Street	Romney
Willow Chapel School	Willow Chapel School	late 19th century	Capon Springs Road (CR 16)	Capon Springs
Willow Chapel United Methodist Church	Willow Chapel United Methodist Church	1895	Capon Springs Road (CR 16)	Capon Springs
Wilson-Wodrow-Mytinger House†	Wilson-Wodrow-Mytinger House	c. 1760	51 West Gravel Lane	Romney
Yellow Spring Mill†	Yellow Spring Mill	c. 1896–1898	State Route 259 (WV 259)	Yellow Spring
Zion Church of Christ	Zion Church of Christ		Zion Church Road	Hoy
Zoar Baptist Church	Zoar Baptist Church		Augusta-Ford Hill Road (CR 7)	Augusta

== Nonextant historic sites ==
Site	Image	Year built	Year demolished	Address	Community
70 Whitacre Loop	70 Whitacre Loop	19th-century	2014	70 Whitacre Loop	Capon Bridge
Albin's Inn				Northwestern Turnpike	Pleasant Dale
Brady Building			1966	East Main Street	Romney
Farmer's Exchange		late 19th century		North Bolton Street	Romney
Fort Edwards		mid-18th century		Cold Stream Road (CR 45/20)	Capon Bridge
Fort Forman		c. 1755		State Route 28 (WV 28)	Vance
Fort Pearsall	Fort Pearsall site	c. 1755		Indian Mound Cemetery	Romney
Furnace School	Furnace School		2010	Bloomery Pike (WV 127)	Bloomery
Old Hampshire County Courthouse	Old Hampshire County Courthouse	c. 1833	1921	East Main Street and North High Street	Romney
Homer's Fort		1750s		Cacapon River Road (CR 14)	Hooks Mills
Keller House (Century Hotel)		c. 1800	1913	East Main Street	Romney
Kuykendall Polygonal Barn†		c. 1906	2005	South Branch River Road (CR 8)	Romney
New Century Hotel	New Century Hotel	1914	1970s	East Main Street	Romney
Old Romney High School	Old Romney High School		1950s	School Street	Romney
Virginia House (Parker Hotel)				West Main Street	Romney
Old Winchester and Western Railroad		1920s		Near WV 259	Intermont
Wirgman Building	Wirgman Building	c. 1825	1965	East Main Street	Romney

== See also ==
- National Register of Historic Places listings in Hampshire County, West Virginia
- List of Registered Historic Places in West Virginia

Contents: Counties in West Virginia

Barbour - Berkeley - Boone - Braxton - Brooke - Cabell - Calhoun - Clay - Doddridge - Fayette - Gilmer - Grant - Greenbrier - Hampshire - Hancock - Hardy - Harrison - Jackson - Jefferson - Kanawha - Lewis - Lincoln - Logan - Marion - Marshall - Mason - McDowell - Mercer - Mineral - Mingo - Monongalia - Monroe - Morgan - Nicholas - Ohio - Pendleton - Pleasants - Pocahontas - Preston - Putnam - Raleigh - Randolph - Ritchie - Roane - Summers - Taylor - Tucker - Tyler - Upshur - Wayne - Webster - Wetzel - Wirt - Wood - Wyoming
