= Fort Edwards =

Fort Edwards may refer to:

- A French and Indian War fort near Capon Bridge, West Virginia
- A 19th-century US Army and trading post near Warsaw, Illinois

== See also ==
- Fort Edward (disambiguation)
