= Fort Edward =

Fort Edward could refer to:

Canada

- Fort Edward (Nova Scotia), a military fort located in Windsor, Nova Scotia
- Fort Edward (Prince Edward Island), a military fort located in Charlottetown, Prince Edward Island

South Africa

- Fort Edward (South Africa), a military fort established in the Spelonken area of the northern Transvaal region

United States

- Fort Edward (town), New York, a town in New York
- Fort Edward (village), New York, a village in New York

== See also ==
- Fort Edwards (disambiguation)
