= Fort Mill Ridge Wildlife Management Area =

State Wildlife Management Area in Hampshire County, West Virginia

- IUCN category V (protected landscape/seascape)
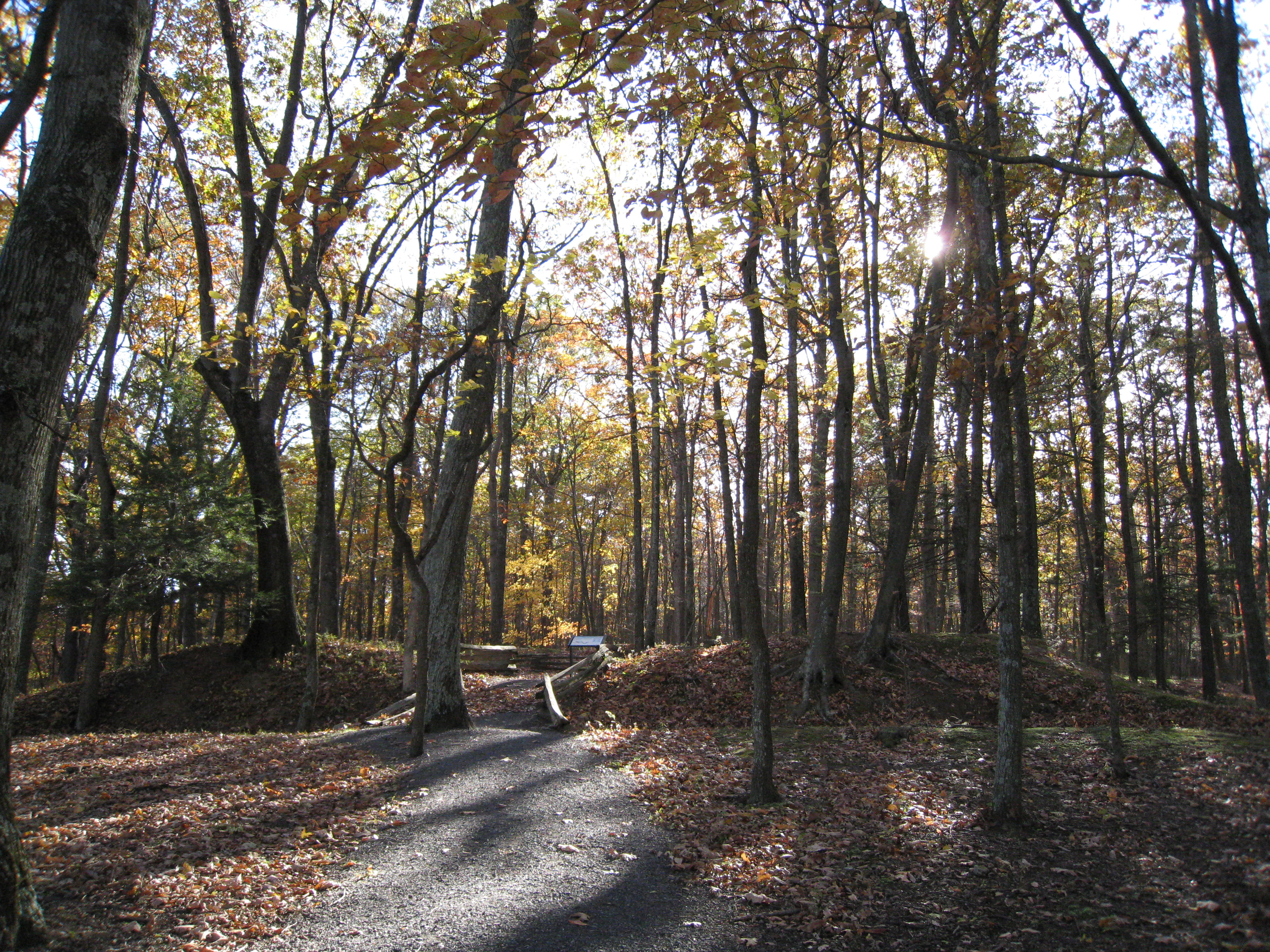
- Civil War-era redoubt at Fort Mill Ridge

- Location within West Virginia
- Location: Hampshire, West Virginia, United States
- Coordinates: 39°19′30″N 78°47′27″W
- Area: 217 acres (88 ha)
- Elevation: 958 ft (292 m)
- Website: WVDNR District 2 Wildlife Management Areas

The Fort Mill Ridge Wildlife Management Area is located on 217 acres (0.88 km^{2}) two miles (3 km) southwest of Romney in Hampshire County, West Virginia. Fort Mill Ridge WMA is owned by the West Virginia Division of Natural Resources. The Fort Mill Ridge Civil War Trenches are located at the top of the Fort Mill Ridge access road.

Fort Mill Ridge WMA is located atop Mill Creek Mountain's Fort Mill Ridge and is bound to its west by Mill Creek and its tributary Core Run and bound to its east by the South Branch Potomac River. The South Branch Valley Railroad runs along the WMA's eastern side, parallel to the South Branch. Fort Mill Ridge WMA ranges in elevation from 680 feet (210 m) to 1,100 feet (340 m). Its forests consist primarily of various oaks and Virginia pines. The primary game species are deer and squirrel. Fishing for warmwater species is available on the South Branch via an access road on the eastern side of the WMA. Camping is not permitted.

== See also ==
- Animal conservation
- Fishing
- Hunting
- List of West Virginia wildlife management areas
