= Old Methodist District Parsonage =

Historic house in West Virginia, United States

- U.S. National Register of Historic Places
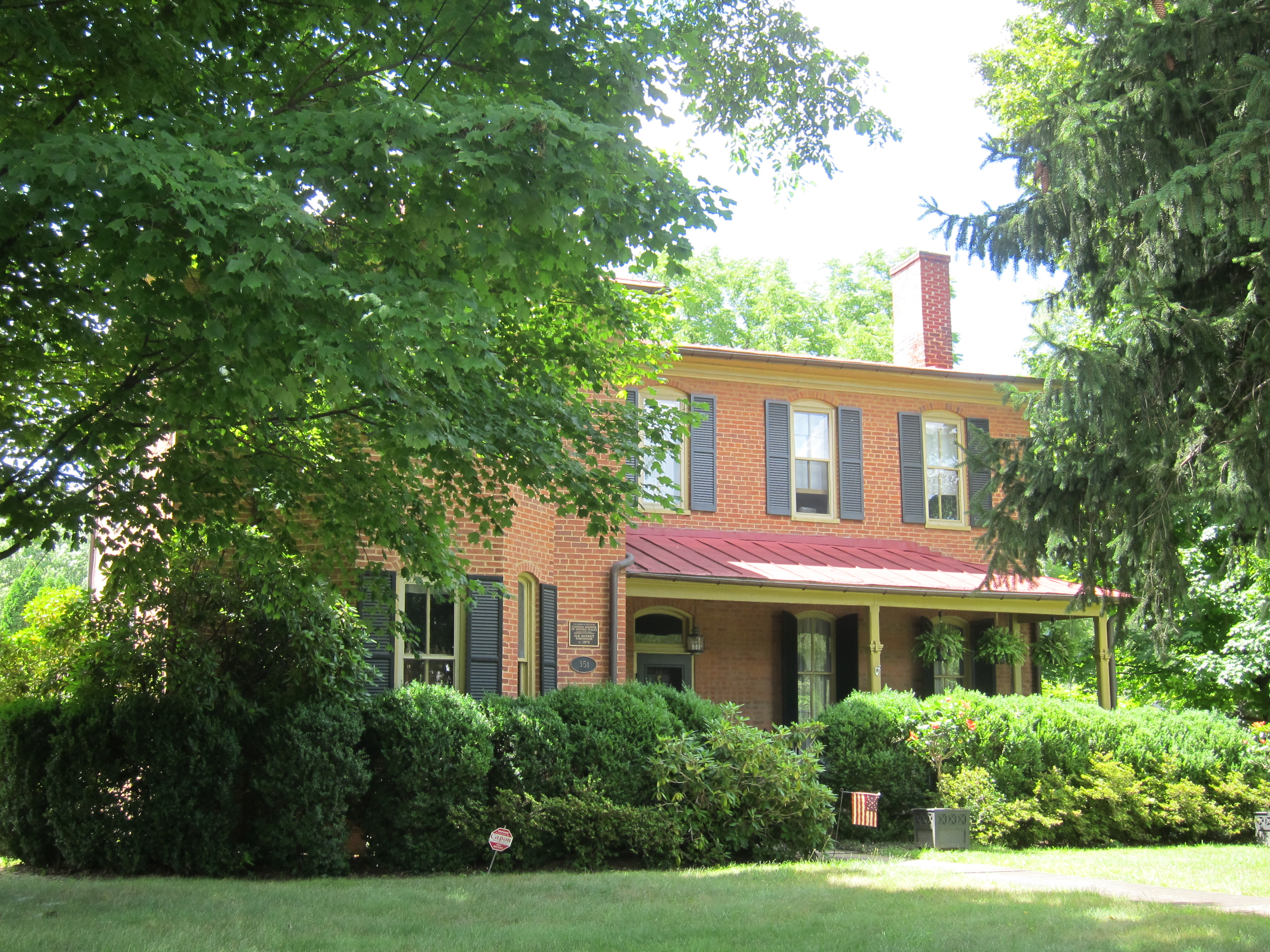

- Location within Romney, West Virginia Location within Eastern Panhandle of West Virginia Location within West Virginia Location within the United States
- Location: 351 North High Street, Romney, West Virginia
- Coordinates: 39°20′43″N 78°45′18″W
- Area: less than one acre
- Built: c. 1868–1882
- Architectural style: Italianate
- NRHP reference No.: 05000398
- Added to NRHP: May 5, 2005

The Old Methodist District Parsonage is a 19th-century Italianate residence in Romney, West Virginia, United States. It is a two-story brick dwelling constructed between 1868 and 1882 to serve as the district parsonage for the area's Methodist churches. After it fell out of use by the church, the eight-room residence was purchased and restored by the Long family and currently features 18th and 19th century furnishings and folk art. The Old Parsonage was listed on the National Register of Historic Places in 2005.

== See also ==
- List of historic sites in Hampshire County, West Virginia
- National Register of Historic Places listings in Hampshire County, West Virginia
