= Frye's Inn =

Inn Located at Capon Bridge, West Virginia

Coordinates: 39.297676°N 78.433403°W

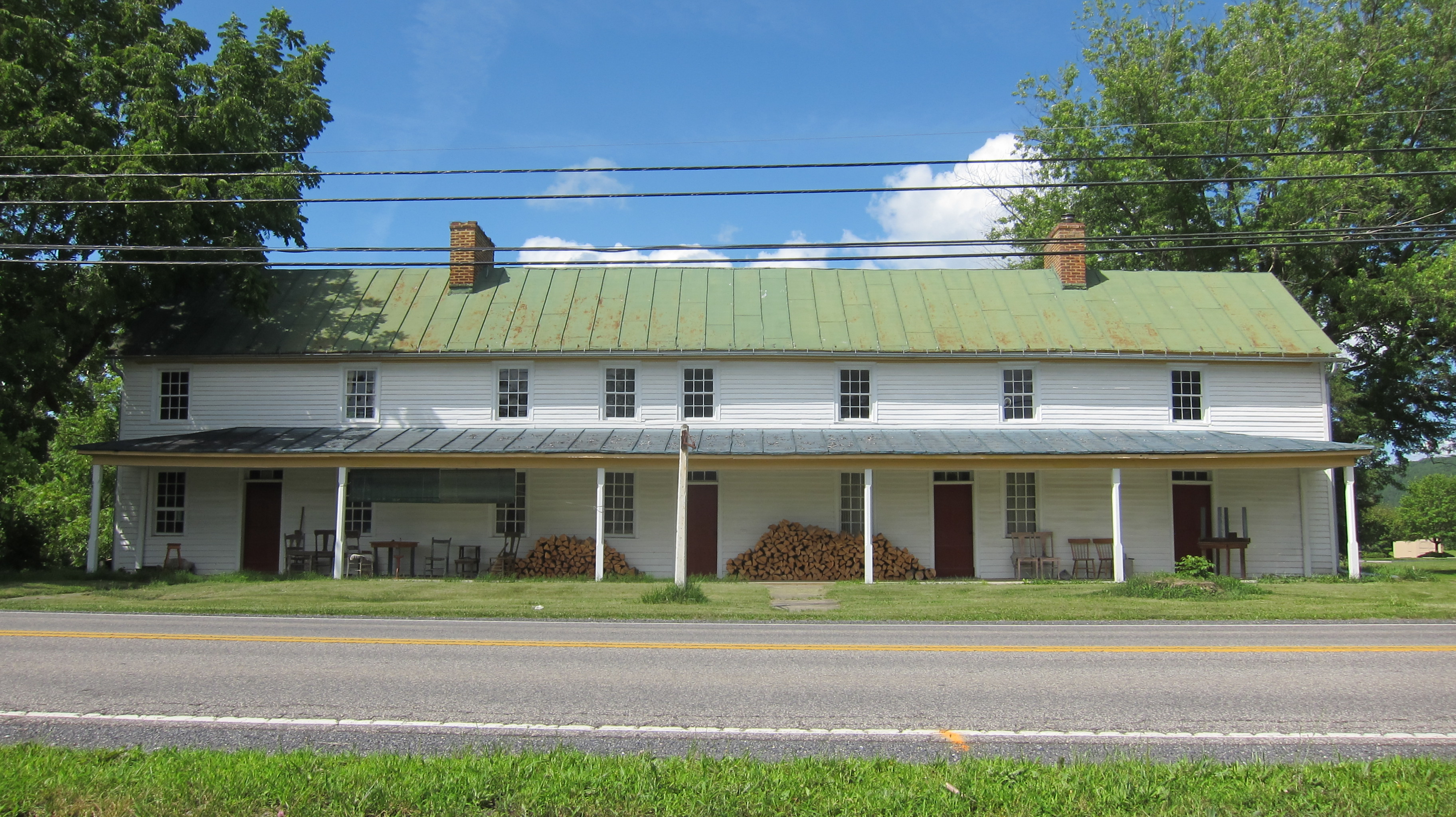
Frye's Inn photographed from across the Northwestern Turnpike (U.S. Route 50) on 14 July 2013.

Frye's Inn is an early 19th-century stagecoach inn and tavern near the "Capon Bridge" that crosses the Cacapon River in Capon Bridge, West Virginia.

== History ==
Frye's Inn, located on the east side of the Cacapon River, was constructed between 1800 and 1818 by Margaret Caudy and her husband Eli Beall. Originally known as Beall's Tavern, the log structure became a haven for early pioneers and stagecoach travelers headed west on the Northwestern Turnpike (presently U.S. Route 50). Beall's daughter Sarah Jane married a man with the surname Frye and this marriage between the Beall and Frye families resulted in the tavern's name change to Frye's Inn.

During the American Civil War, General Stonewall Jackson of the Confederate States Army and his men paused to pray under the large walnut tree directly opposite the inn along the turnpike. This event was later recounted by Jenny Frye in a local newspaper.

The inn currently serves as the private residence of Thomas Kipps of Capon Bridge.

== See also ==
- List of historic sites in Hampshire County, West Virginia
