= Yellow Spring Mill =

- U.S. National Register of Historic Places
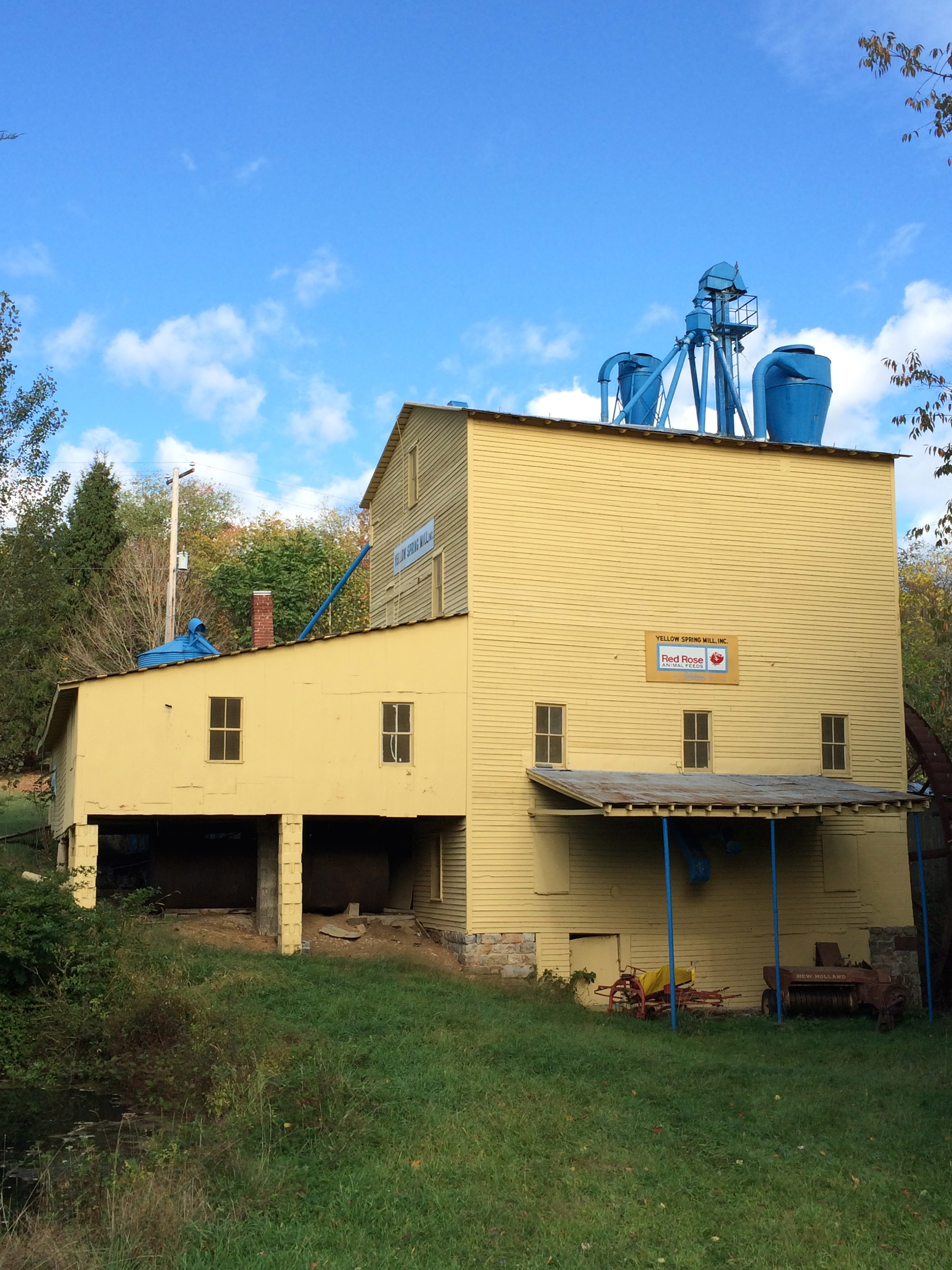

- Location within Eastern Panhandle of West Virginia Location within West Virginia Location within the United States
- Location: Junction of WV 259 and Cacapon River Rd. Yellow Spring, West Virginia, USA
- Coordinates: 39°10′57″N 78°30′36″W
- Area: 3.11 acres (1.26 ha)
- Built: c. 1896
- NRHP reference No.: 14001056
- Added to NRHP: December 16, 2014

Yellow Spring Mill is a historic grist mill at the junction of West Virginia Route 259 and Cacapon River Road in Yellow Spring, West Virginia. The main building is a three-story wood-frame structure, with a gable roof, clapboard siding, and a foundation of concrete and stone. A single-story ell extends to one side. The property includes as outbuildings two residential cottages and a storage shed, along with two mill ponds and related raceways. The mill was established about 1896, and remained in operation as an economic mainstay of the community until 1990.

The mill was listed on the National Register of Historic Places in 2015.

== See also ==
- List of historic sites in Hampshire County, West Virginia
- National Register of Historic Places listings in Hampshire County, West Virginia
