= Brill Octagon House =

Historic house in West Virginia, United States

- The Brill Octagon House
- U.S. National Register of Historic Places
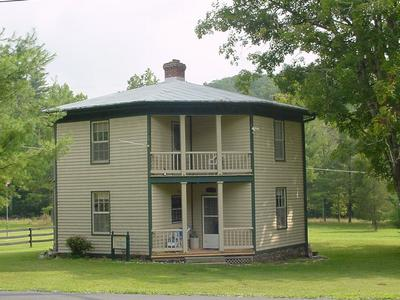

- Location within Eastern Panhandle of West Virginia Location within West Virginia Location within the United States
- Location: Capon Springs and McIlwee Rds., Capon Springs, West Virginia
- Coordinates: 39°8′16″N 78°29′27″W
- Area: 1.7 acres (0.69 ha)
- Built: 1890
- Architectural style: Octagon
- NRHP reference No.: 16000313
- Added to NRHP: May 31, 2016

The Brill Octagon House is a historic octagon house at Capon Springs and McIlwee Roads in Capon Springs, West Virginia. It is a two-story wood-frame structure, that is actually cruciform in shape, but is given an octagonal appearance by the presence of two-story triangular porches that join the corners of the cross. The house was built about 1890 by one of a father-son pair, both named Elias Brill. The elder Brill, a more likely candidate as its builder, was a farm laborer, and was according to family lore guided in the building's design by an architect who was a summer guest at the Capon Springs Resort. The design is apparently a throwback to the briefly popular octagon house movement led by Orson Squire Fowler in the 1850s.

The house was listed on the National Register of Historic Places in 2016.

== See also ==
- List of octagon houses
- List of historic sites in Hampshire County, West Virginia
- National Register of Historic Places listings in Hampshire County, West Virginia
