= Hook's Tavern =

Historic tavern in West Virginia, United States

- U.S. National Register of Historic Places
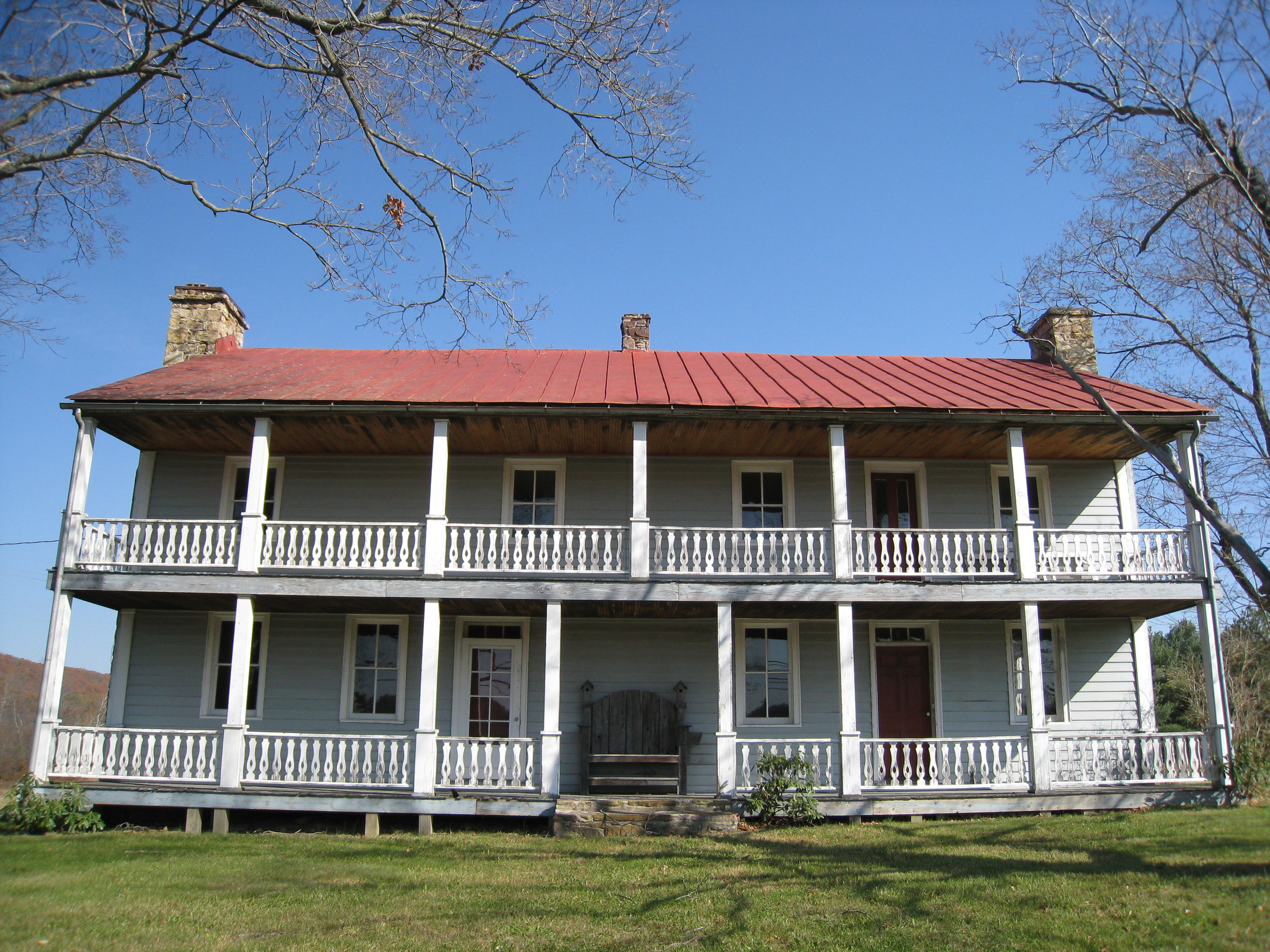
- Hook's Tavern's front elevation viewed from U.S. Route 50.

- Location within Eastern Panhandle of West Virginia Location within West Virginia Location within the United States
- Location: Junction of U.S. Route 50 & Smokey Hollow Road (County Route 6), Capon Bridge, West Virginia
- Nearest city: Capon Bridge, West Virginia
- Coordinates: 39°18′3″N 78°24′51″W
- NRHP reference No.: 11000260
- Added to NRHP: April 29, 2011

Hook's Tavern or Hook Tavern was a late 18th-century tavern along the Northwestern Turnpike (U.S. Route 50) east of Capon Bridge in Hampshire County, West Virginia. It was listed on the National Register of Historic Places on April 29, 2011. It burned in an alleged arson on October 14, 2022.

== History ==
Located near the eastern base of Bear Garden Mountain in the Mill Branch valley, Hook's Tavern was constructed along the Northwestern Turnpike between the 1790 and 1809 on property belonging to early Hampshire County settler Peter Mauzy.

In 1840, the property was purchased by the Hook family who began operating the building as a tavern. Samuel Hook and John B. Sherrard obtained a hotel license on May 26, 1848, to operate the tavern as a fully functioning hotel. On June 1, 1862, Hook paid $10 for another hotel keeper's license.

During the American Civil War, on February 3, 1862, J. A. Hunter of the Confederate States Army stated that because of severe weather, it was necessary for the Confederates to commandeer Samuel Hook's tavern and wood for the comfort of 80 sick men in his charge.

Renovations in July 1956 revealed the name and date "William C. Black, May 7, 1845" on a plaster wall. Other names and remarks discovered included: "I can throw any mule driver on the road, John New" and "Too much snuff, McCauley" dated May 7, 1853.

The Hook family and its descendants owned the tavern and its surrounding property from 1840 until 1987 when it was purchased by real estate developer Edward Noble of Atlanta, Georgia. In 2009, the tavern and its adjacent three acres were listed on the market for sale. The property became a junk store owned by Judson Eversole, of Eversole Enterprises. Hook's Tavern burned down in the early morning hours of October 14, 2022.

== Architecture ==
Hook's Tavern was an ell-shaped structure with one leg parallel to U.S. Route 50 and the other parallel to Smokey Hollow Road (County Route 6). Hook's Tavern was a clapboard-covered, two-story structure with floors on three varying heights indicating that it was built in several phases. The tavern's front face along U.S. Route 50 was graced with a two-story porch. Its oldest constructed section contained a large fireplace with printles upon which a crane swung pots over the fire. Hook Tavern contained approximately 4,000 square feet (370 m^{2}) consisting of ten rooms and two bathrooms.

== Image gallery ==
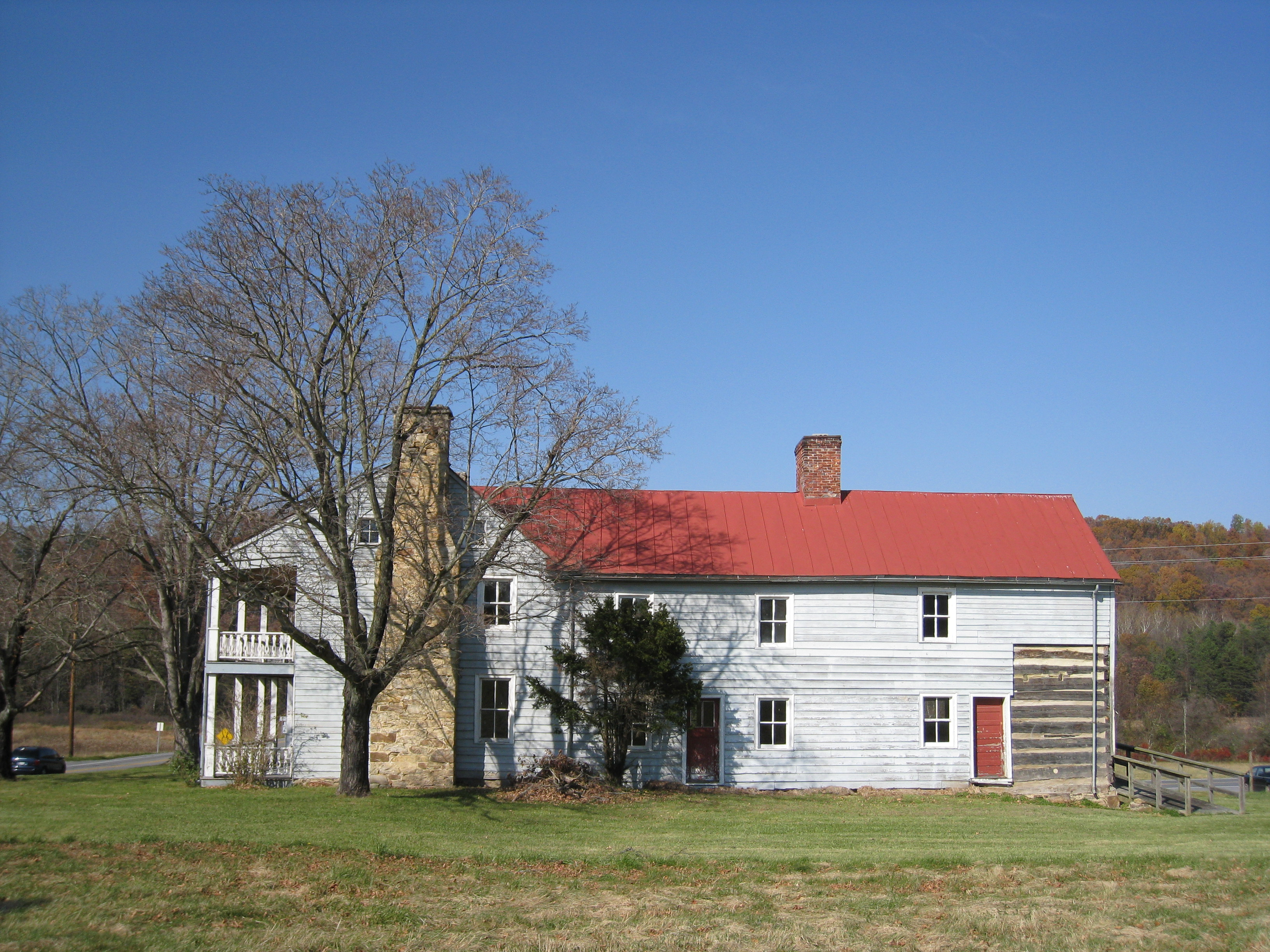

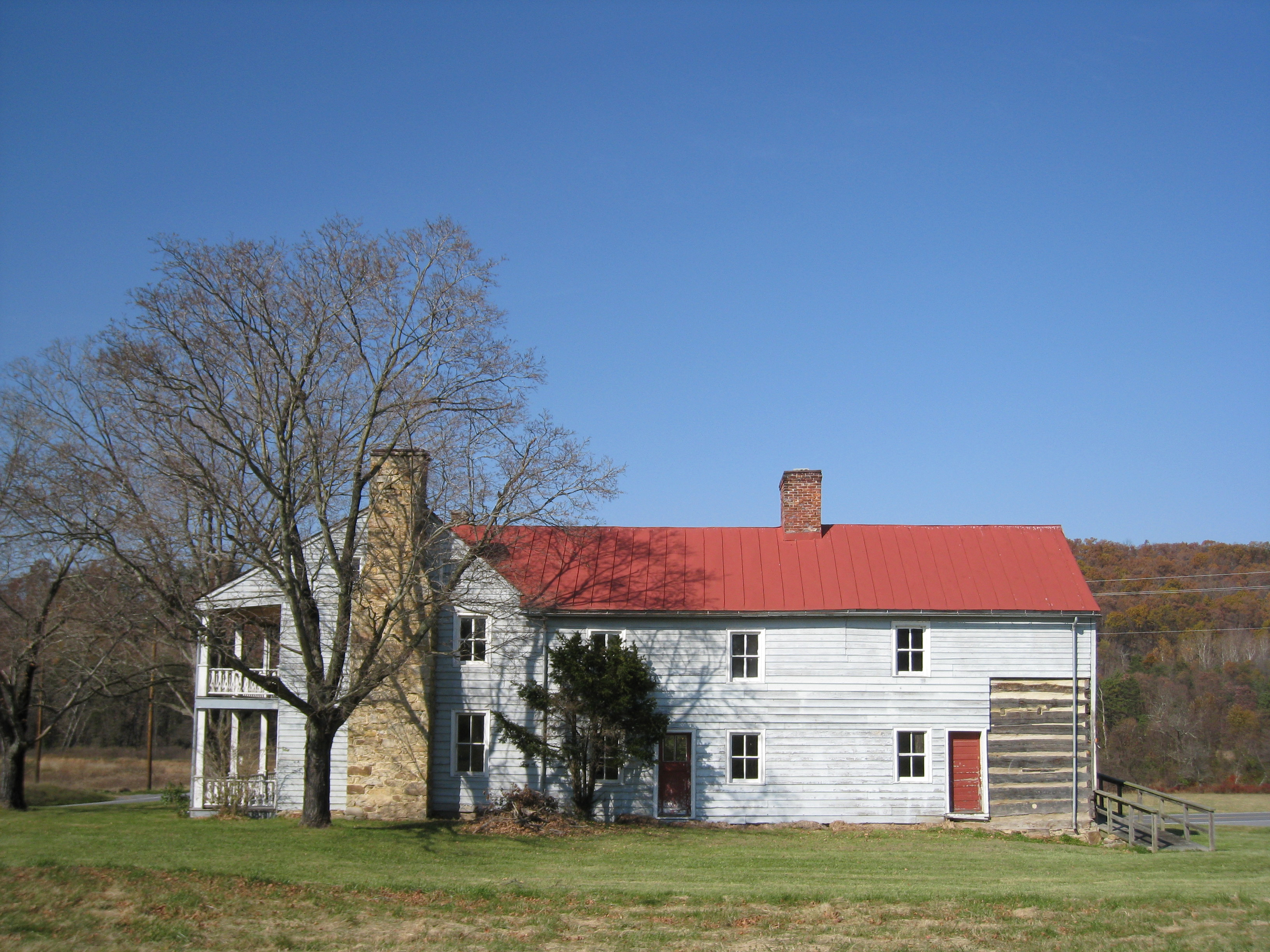

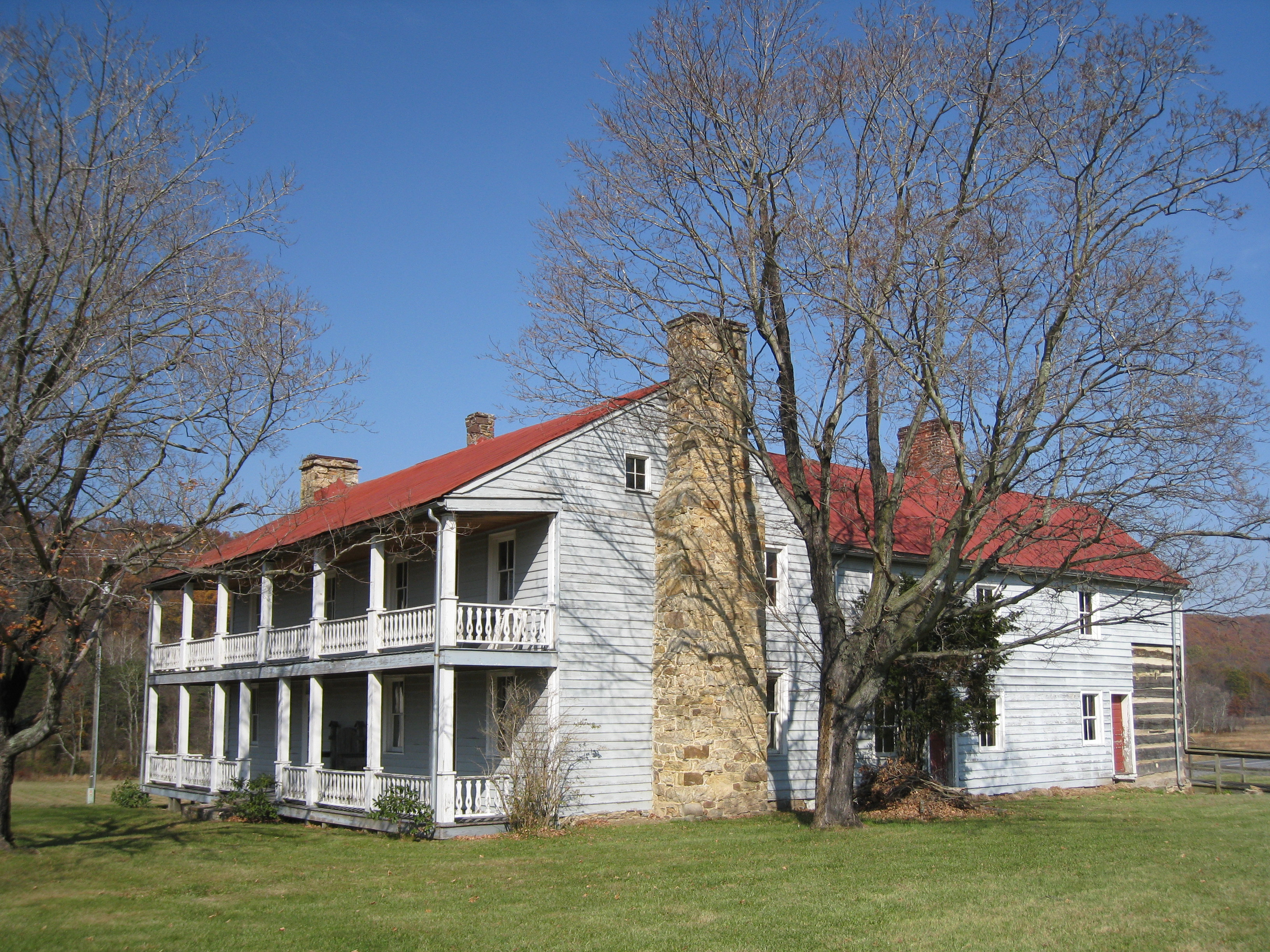

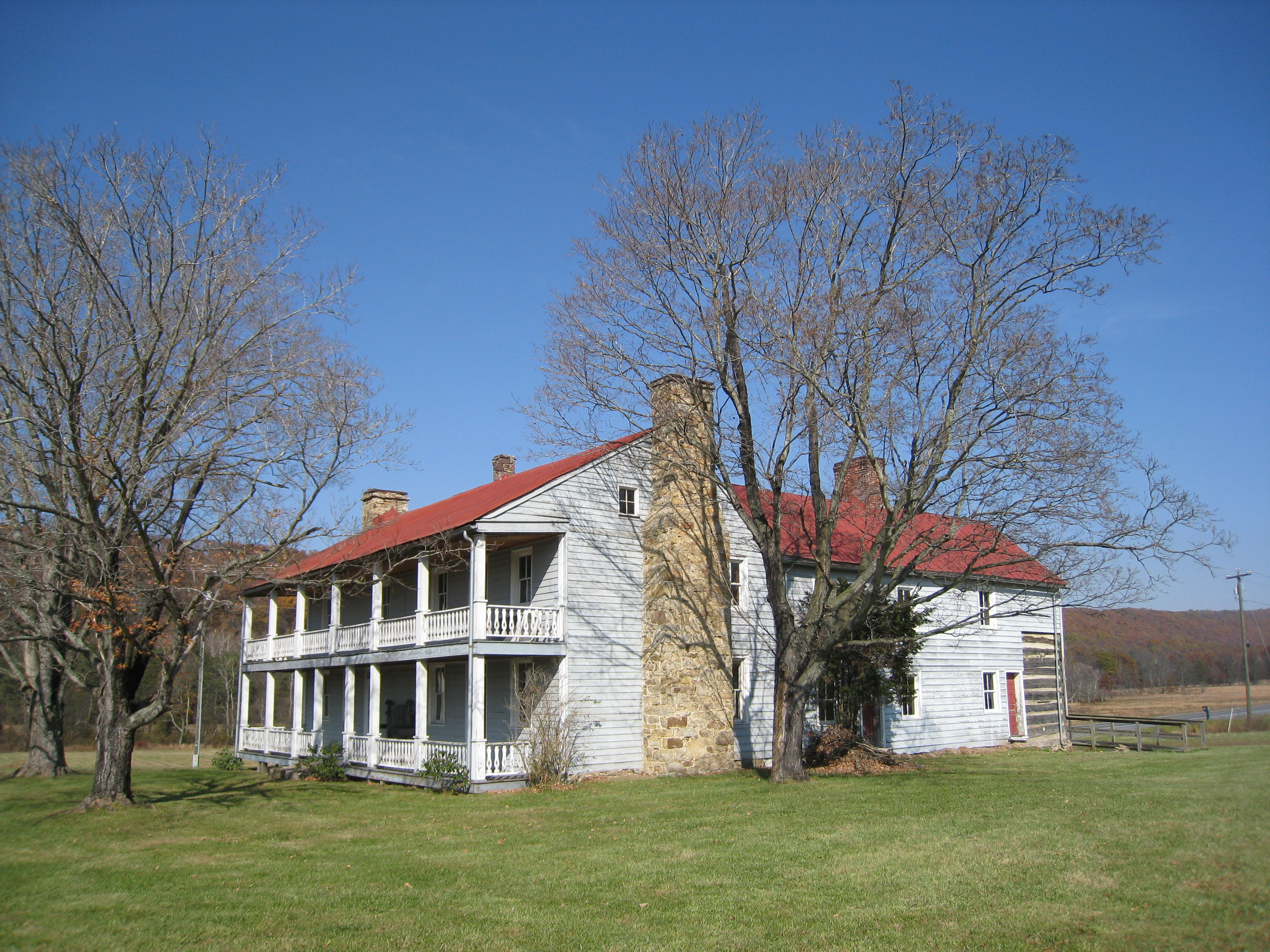

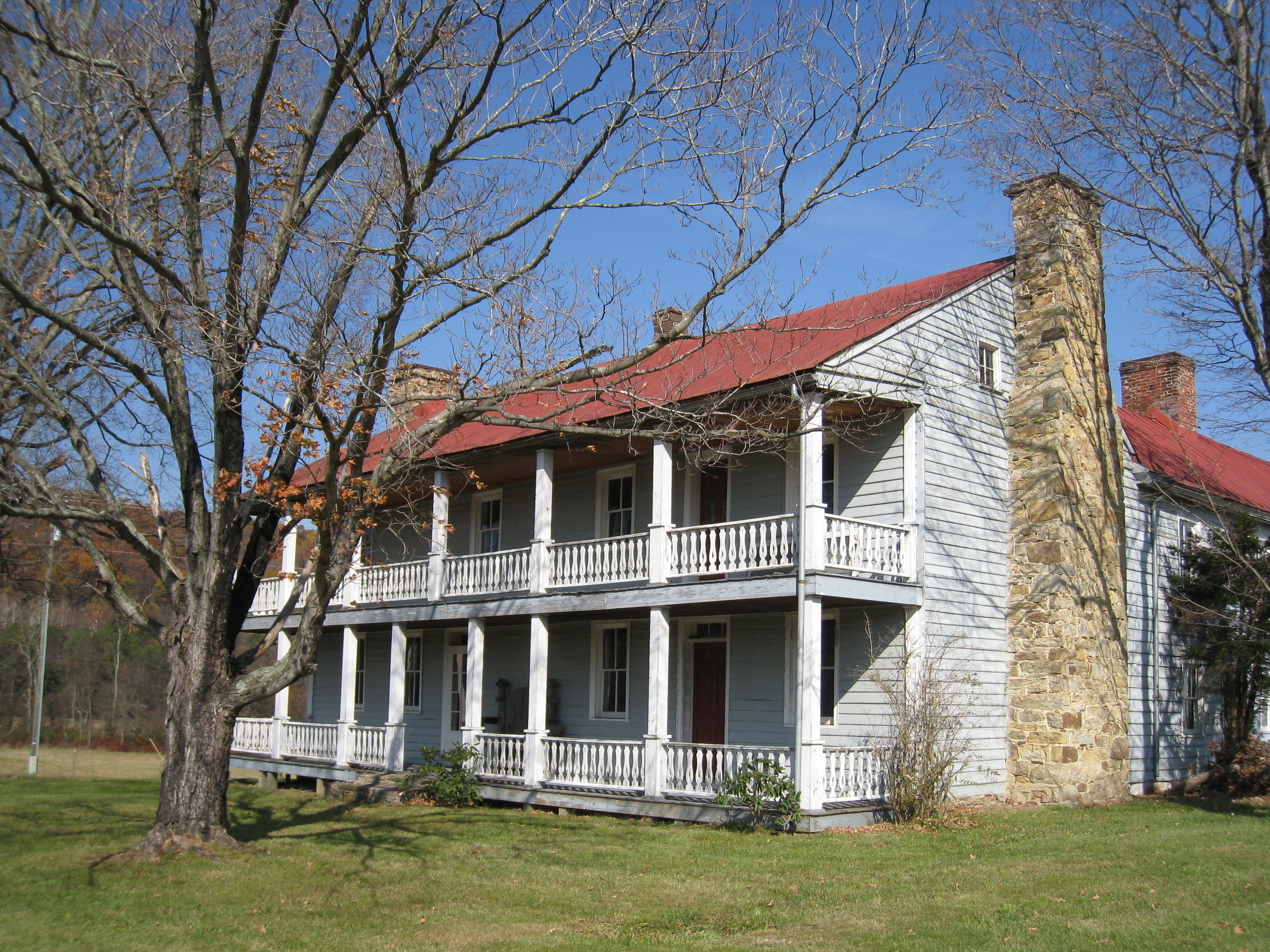

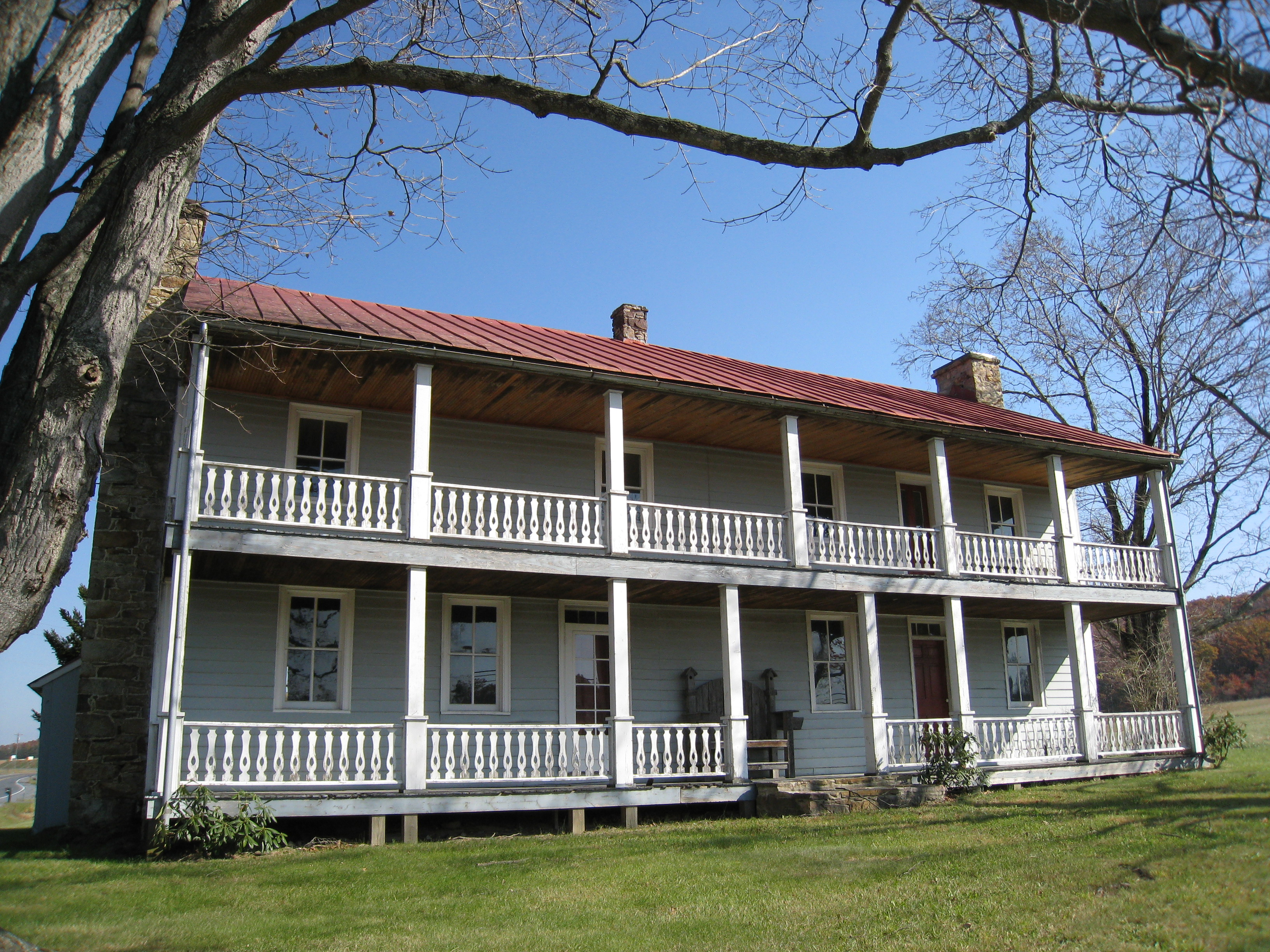

== See also ==
- List of historic sites in Hampshire County, West Virginia
- National Register of Historic Places listings in Hampshire County, West Virginia
