= Scanlon Farm =

Historic building in West Virginia

- U.S. National Register of Historic Places
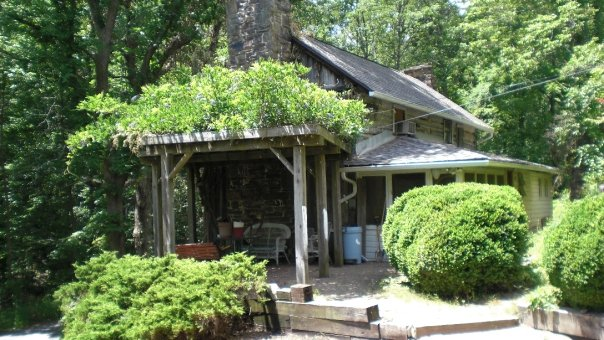

- Location within Eastern Panhandle of West Virginia Location within West Virginia Location within the United States
- Location: Three Churches Run Road (County Route 5/4), Three Churches, West Virginia
- Coordinates: 39°23′46″N 78°38′24″W
- Area: 7 acres (2.8 ha)
- Built: circa 1840, 1865
- Architectural style: Midland Tradition Log House
- NRHP reference No.: 87002521
- Added to NRHP: February 3, 1988

Scanlon Farm (also known as the Scanlon Log House) is a late 19th-century loghouse and farm overlooking Three Churches Run east of the unincorporated community of Three Churches, West Virginia. It was listed on the National Register of Historic Places on February 3, 1988.

== Architecture ==
=== Exterior ===
The farm's main structure is the Scanlon Log House, a two-story log structure built around 1840 by the Larimore family and acquired by the Scanlon family in the 1860s. It is a folk house of the Midland tradition, in the early German settlement era pattern. The house is one room deep and linear in design with external chimneys on both gable ends of the house. The logs in its construction are squared, hand-hewn, and laid horizontally, notched on the ends, and with narrow chinking. (Chinking refers to the mortar between the logs). There are vertical end logs that serve to anchor the structure's four corners. The two massive stone chimneys are original to the house, although the east side has been partially rebuilt. The side-gable roof is moderately pitched and is composed of slate. The Scanlon Log House was constructed in two sections: the east side being the original section built by the Larimore family and the western half was added around 1865 by Thomas Scanlon shortly after the Scanlon family acquired the property. To the rear of the house and slightly to the west stands the remains of a large stone chimney. This chimney (circa 1840) served the detached kitchen which itself disappeared in the 19th century.

=== Interior ===
The interior of the Scanlon Log House consists of a "two rooms over two rooms" arrangement with a narrow winding staircase connecting the two floors. The two bedrooms on the second floor are slightly smaller than their corresponding rooms on the first floor, with a small connecting room. Overhead beams are exposed on the interior, and the interior walls are composed of unadorned vertical wood siding. A wooden mantelpiece graces the end of the first floor parlor. Much of the furnishings on the interior are original Scanlon family pieces.

=== Contributing structures ===
To the rear of the Scanlon Log House are two adjacent outbuildings, both dating from the 19th century. One is a one-story, wood-frame, gable- roof smoke house with wide vertical siding. Next to it is a slightly smaller gable-roof, wood outbuilding that serves as a privy. The privy is characterized by whitewashed vertical narrow boards and some slightly decorative woodwork over the door and along the roof line on the exterior. Also on the Scanlon Farm is the two-story, gable-roof, wood-sided barn constructed in the 19th century.

== See also ==
- List of historic sites in Hampshire County, West Virginia
- National Register of Historic Places listings in Hampshire County, West Virginia
