= Kuykendall Polygonal Barn =

- U.S. National Register of Historic Places
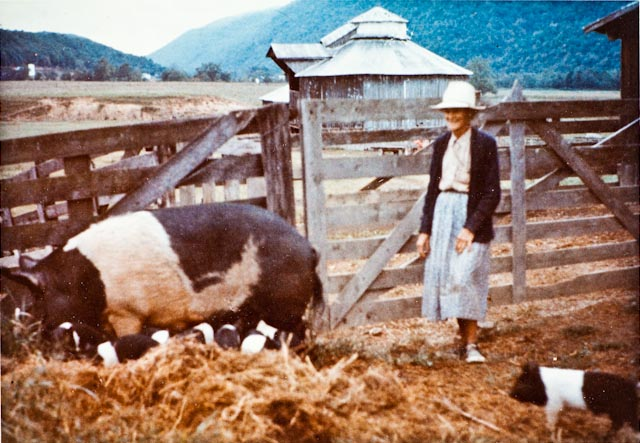

- Location within Eastern Panhandle of West Virginia Location within West Virginia Location within the United States
- Location: South Branch River Road (County Route 8), Romney, West Virginia
- Coordinates: 39°14′07″N 78°50′36″W
- Area: 5 acres (2.0 ha)
- Built: circa 1906
- Architect: John Clowser
- Architectural style: Polygonal Barn
- MPS: Round and Polygonal Barns of West Virginia TR
- NRHP reference No.: 85001549
- Added to NRHP: July 9, 1985

The Kuykendall Polygonal Barn was an early 20th-century polygonal barn in the South Branch Potomac River valley near Romney in Hampshire County, West Virginia, United States. The Kuykendall Polygonal Barn was the only 15-sided barn built in West Virginia, and one of only a few such known to have been constructed in the United States. The barn utilized a number of sophisticated technological innovations not found in West Virginia's other round and polygonal barns. The Kuykendall Polygonal Barn was listed on the National Register of Historic Places on 9 July 1985.

== History ==
The Kuykendall farm is one of the oldest in Hampshire County. Part of a 405-acre (1.64 km^{2}) land grant made by Thomas Fairfax, 6th Lord Fairfax of Cameron to Henry Van Meter in 1749, the property then passed to Abraham Van Meter in 1804, to William Millar in 1833, to Thomas French and George Stump in 1845, to James Stump in 1870, and then to Robert White, trustee to James Sloan in 1879. Sloan passed the farm to his daughter Hannah, wife of William Kuykendall, in 1882. The property remained in the Kuykendall family until 1966 when C. Ellis Hood of Woodsboro, Maryland purchased the farm from the estate of Edith Kuykendall. The farmhouse on the property dates from the mid-18th-century.

The Kuykendall Polygonal Barn was built around 1906 by the Kuykendall family on their farm. The chief carpenter in its construction was John Clowser.

The barn collapsed during a storm in 2005. Restoration efforts are on hold.

== See also ==
- List of historic sites in Hampshire County, West Virginia
- National Register of Historic Places listings in Hampshire County, West Virginia
