= French's Mill =

- U.S. National Register of Historic Places
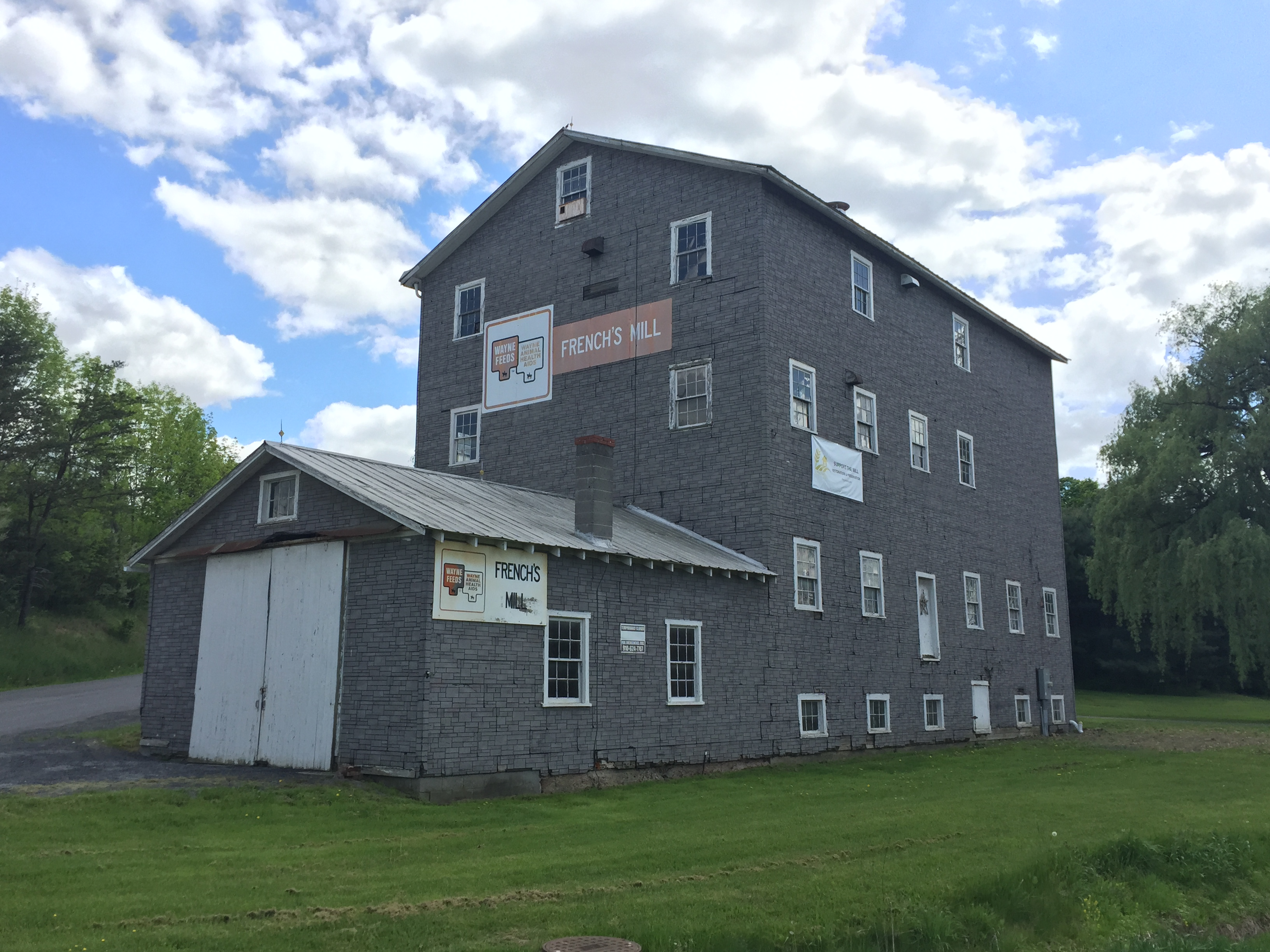
- French's Mill, photographed in May 2015

- Location within Eastern Panhandle of West Virginia Location within West Virginia Location within the United States
- Location: Augusta-Ford Hill Rd. Augusta, West Virginia, USA
- Coordinates: 39°17′38″N 78°38′12″W
- Area: 1 acre (0.40 ha)
- Built: 1911
- NRHP reference No.: 14001056
- Added to NRHP: December 16, 2014

French's Mill is a historic grist mill at the junction of Augusta-Ford Hill and Fairground Roads in Augusta, West Virginia. Its main building is a three-story wood-frame building with a metal roof, asphalt siding, and a concrete foundation. It was built in 1911 on the site of a c. 1890s grist mill that was destroyed by fire. The mill, which was originally water-powered, was converted to operate by electric power in 1949, and ceased operations in 2000. It was also updated in the mid-20th century to accommodated different types of grain, illustrating the evolutionary change of these industrial facilities.

The mill was listed on the National Register of Historic Places in 2014.

French's Mill is currently owned by the Croucher family who intend to renovate the historic mill and showcase an art gallery on the first floor, a model train exhibit on the second floor, and a wildlife collection of furs and pelts on the third floor. The family currently operates an on-site thrift store with all proceeds going toward the renovation of the mill.

== See also ==
- List of historic sites in Hampshire County, West Virginia
- National Register of Historic Places listings in Hampshire County, West Virginia
