= Mount Bethel Church (Three Churches, West Virginia) =

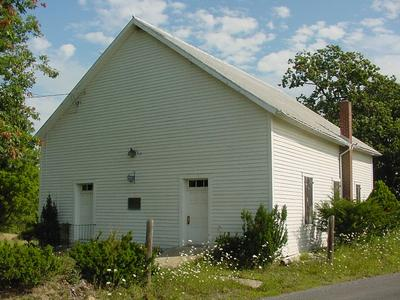
- Mount Bethel Church
- 39°24′06.8″N 78°39′13.7″W
- Location: Three Churches, West Virginia
- Country: United States
- Denomination: Presbyterian

History
- Former name: Mountain Church
- Founded: 1792

Architecture
- Years built: 1837

Specifications
- Materials: Logs with wood siding

Mount Bethel Church is a Presbyterian church located at the junction of County Route 5 (Jersey Mountain Road) and County Route 5/4 (Three Churches Hollow Road) in the unincorporated community of Three Churches north of Romney in Hampshire County, West Virginia, United States.

== History ==
In 1792, a group of Presbyterians established a church near Mount Bethel's current location. It was first called the Mountain Church in 1808 and soon became the center of Presbyterian work in Hampshire County under the auspices of the Reverend John Lyle. The Reverend James Black reorganized the congregation in 1812 and it was renamed Mount Bethel. The present church, built of logs in 1837, is the oldest house of worship in Hampshire County.

== See also ==
- List of historic sites in Hampshire County, West Virginia
