= North River Mills Historic District =

Historic district in West Virginia, United States

- U.S. National Register of Historic Places
- U.S. Historic district
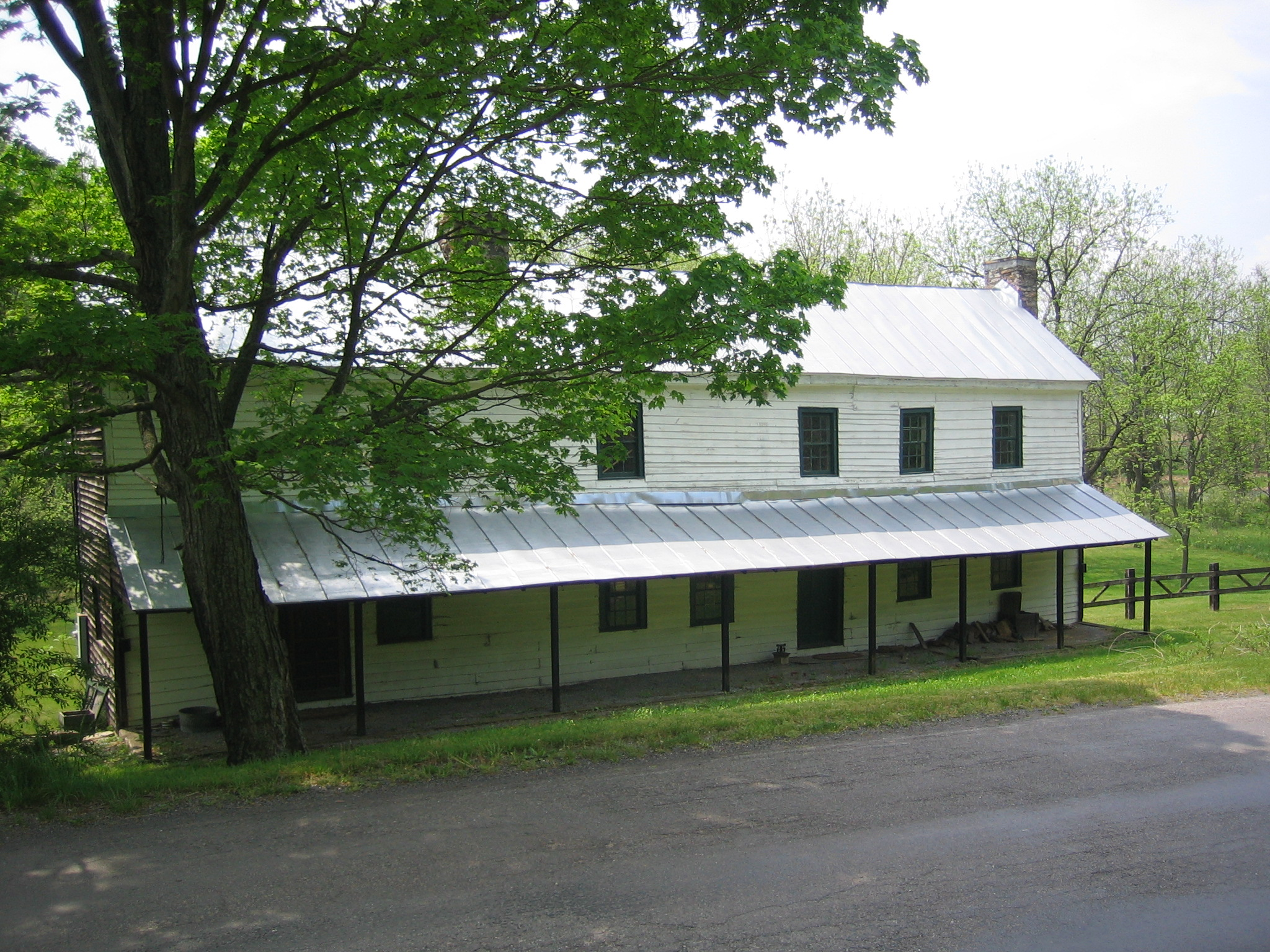
- Hiett Log House, May 2007

- Location within Eastern Panhandle of West Virginia Location within West Virginia Location within the United States
- Location: Junction of County Roads 45/20 and 4/2, North River Mills, West Virginia
- Coordinates: 39°20′11″N 78°30′12″W
- Area: 20 acres (8.1 ha)
- Built by: Harmison, Charlie
- Architect: Moreland, William
- Architectural style: Georgian, Federal, Bungalow, Gothic Revival, Vernacular
- NRHP reference No.: 11000261
- Added to NRHP: May 4, 2011

North River Mills Historic District is a national historic district located at North River Mills, Hampshire County, West Virginia. The district encompasses 25 contributing buildings and five contributing sites. The district lies along Hiett Run, which empties into the North River, a tributary of the Cacapon River. It has become an industrial ghost town, now visited only by summer residents and tourists. The contributing buildings include the Hiett House (c. 1770) with shed and privy; Croston House (c. 1840) and barn (c. 1910); North River Mills Grocery (c. 1810, c. 1920); Shanholtz House (c. 1930), also known as North River Mills Society for Antiquarian Arts and the Diffusion of Knowledge; North River Mills School (c. 1880); Miller House (c. 1790) and associated outbuildings; United Methodist Church (c. 1893); Kump House (c. 1805); and the Moreland House (c. 1880). Contributing sites are the cemetery associated with the Kump House, Miller Mill Site (c. 1880), Shanholtz Mill Site (c. 1930), mill pond (c. 1880), and millrace (c. 1880).

It was listed on the National Register of Historic Places in 2011.

== Gallery ==
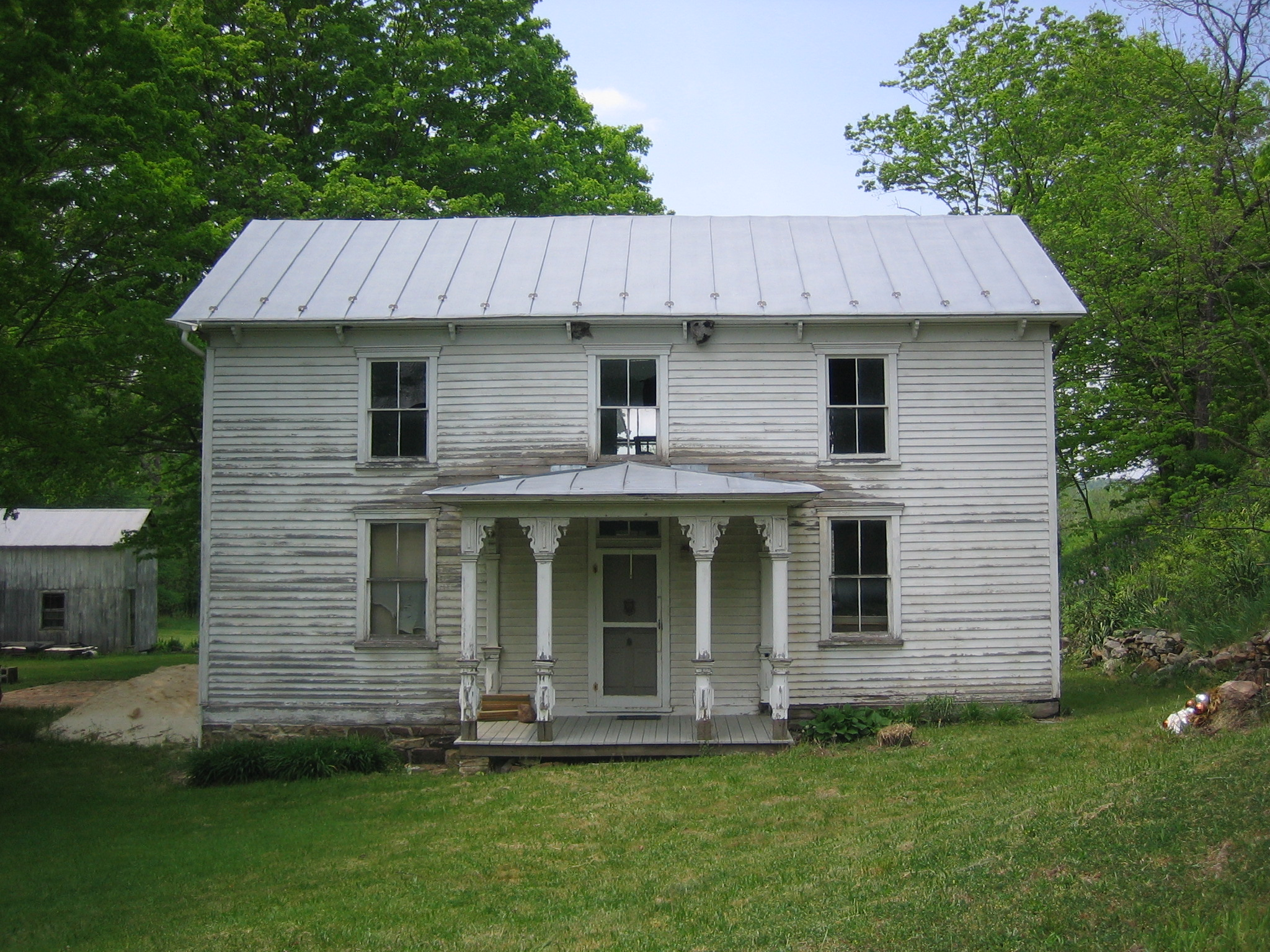
Audra Croston House, May 2007

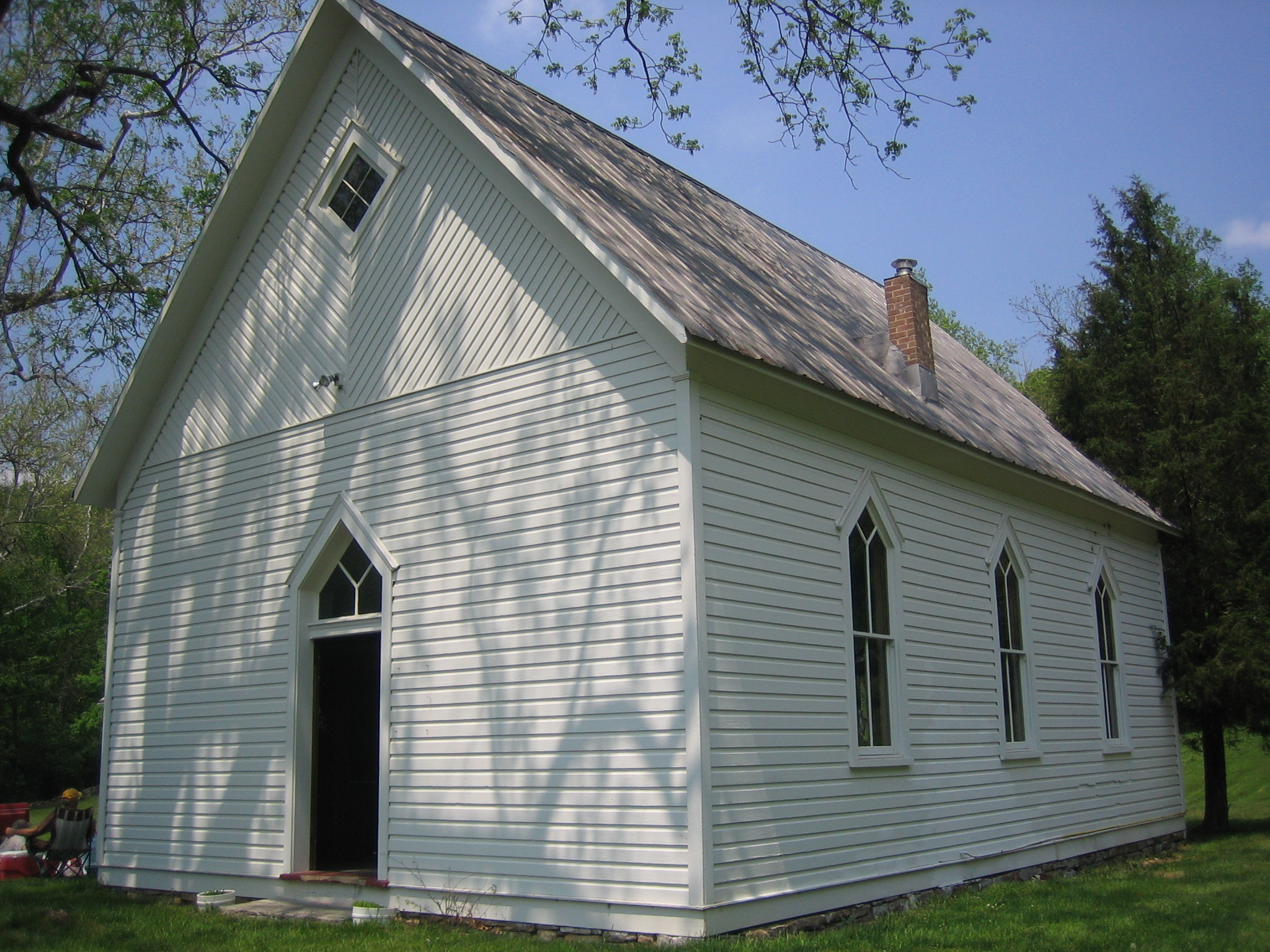
North River Mills United Methodist Church, May 2007

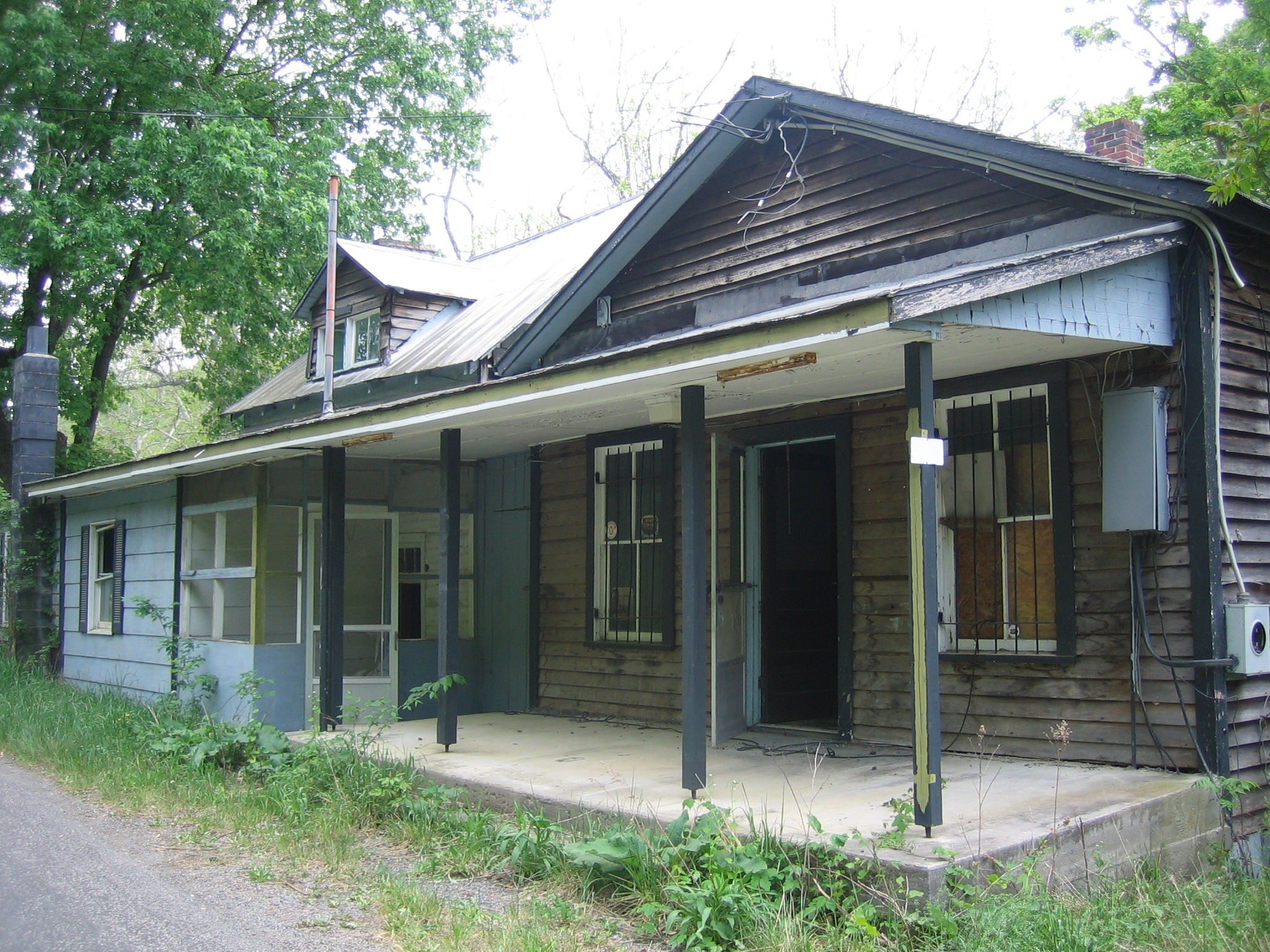
Old North River Mills Store and Post Office, May 2007

== See also ==
- List of historic sites in Hampshire County, West Virginia
- National Register of Historic Places listings in Hampshire County, West Virginia
