= North River Mills, West Virginia =

- Unincorporated community
- Location of North River Mills in West Virginia North River Mills, West Virginia (the United States)
- Coordinates: 39°20′11″N 78°30′11″W
- Country: United States
- State: West Virginia
- County: Hampshire
- Elevation: 814 ft (248 m)
- Time zone: UTC-5 (Eastern (EST))
  - Summer (DST): UTC-4 (EDT)
- ZIP code: 26711
- Area code: 304
- GNIS feature ID: 1555238

North River Mills is a historic unincorporated community in Hampshire County in the U.S. state of West Virginia. North River Mills is located between Capon Bridge and Slanesville on Cold Stream Road (County Routes 15 and 45/20) at its intersection with North River Road (County Route 4/2). The village of North River Mills lies along the eastern banks of North River from which it takes its name.

== Historic sites ==
- Audra Croston Home
- Hiett Log House
- Kump House (early 19th Century)
- North River Mills United Methodist Church
- The North River Mills Historic District was listed on the National Register of Historic Places in 2011.

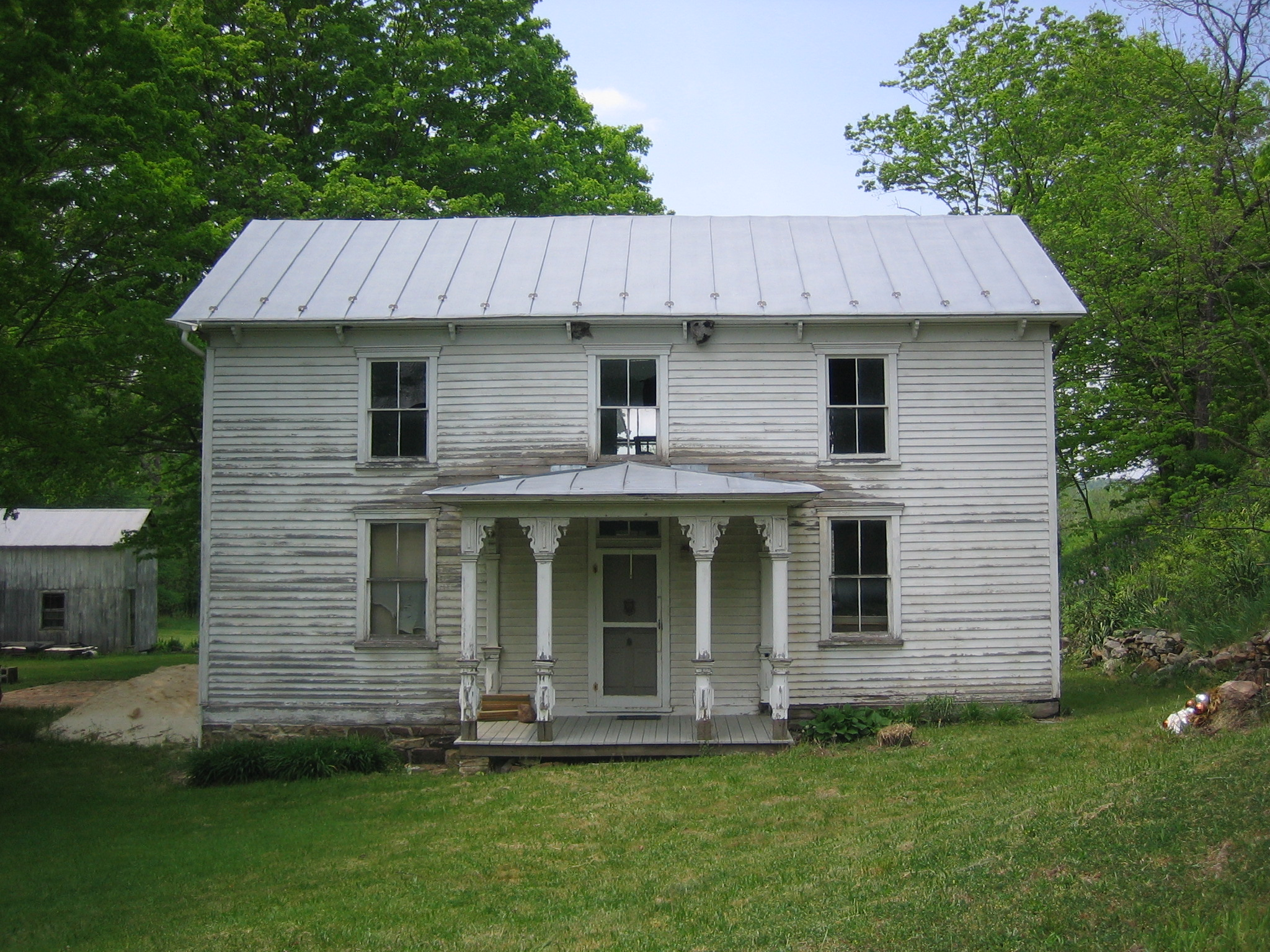
The Audra Croston House along Cold Stream Road (County Route 45/20) in North River Mills

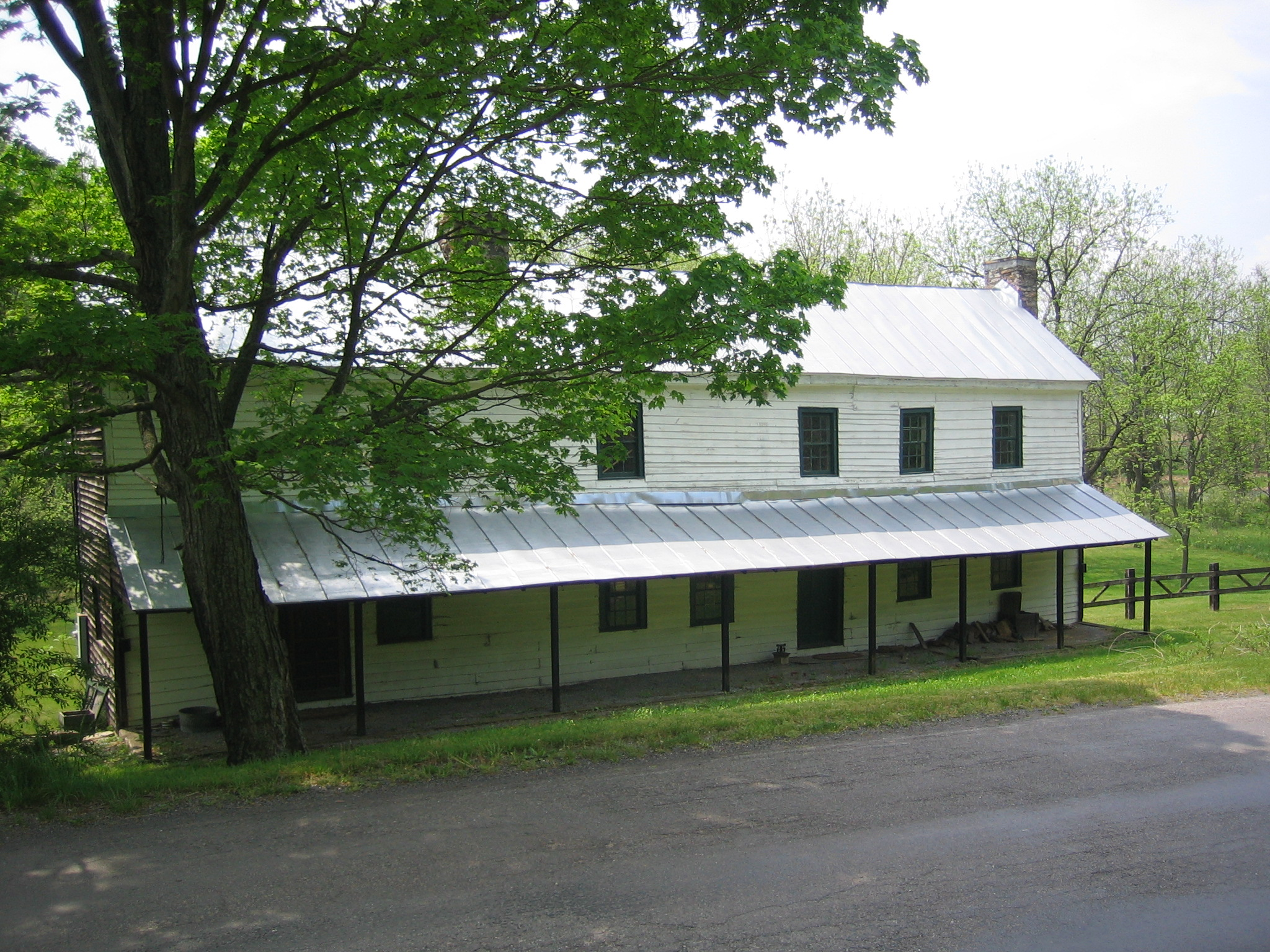
The Hiett Log House along Cold Stream Road (County Route 45/20) in North River Mills

== See also ==
- Ice Mountain
- North River
