= Fort Mill Ridge Civil War Trenches =

- U.S. National Register of Historic Places
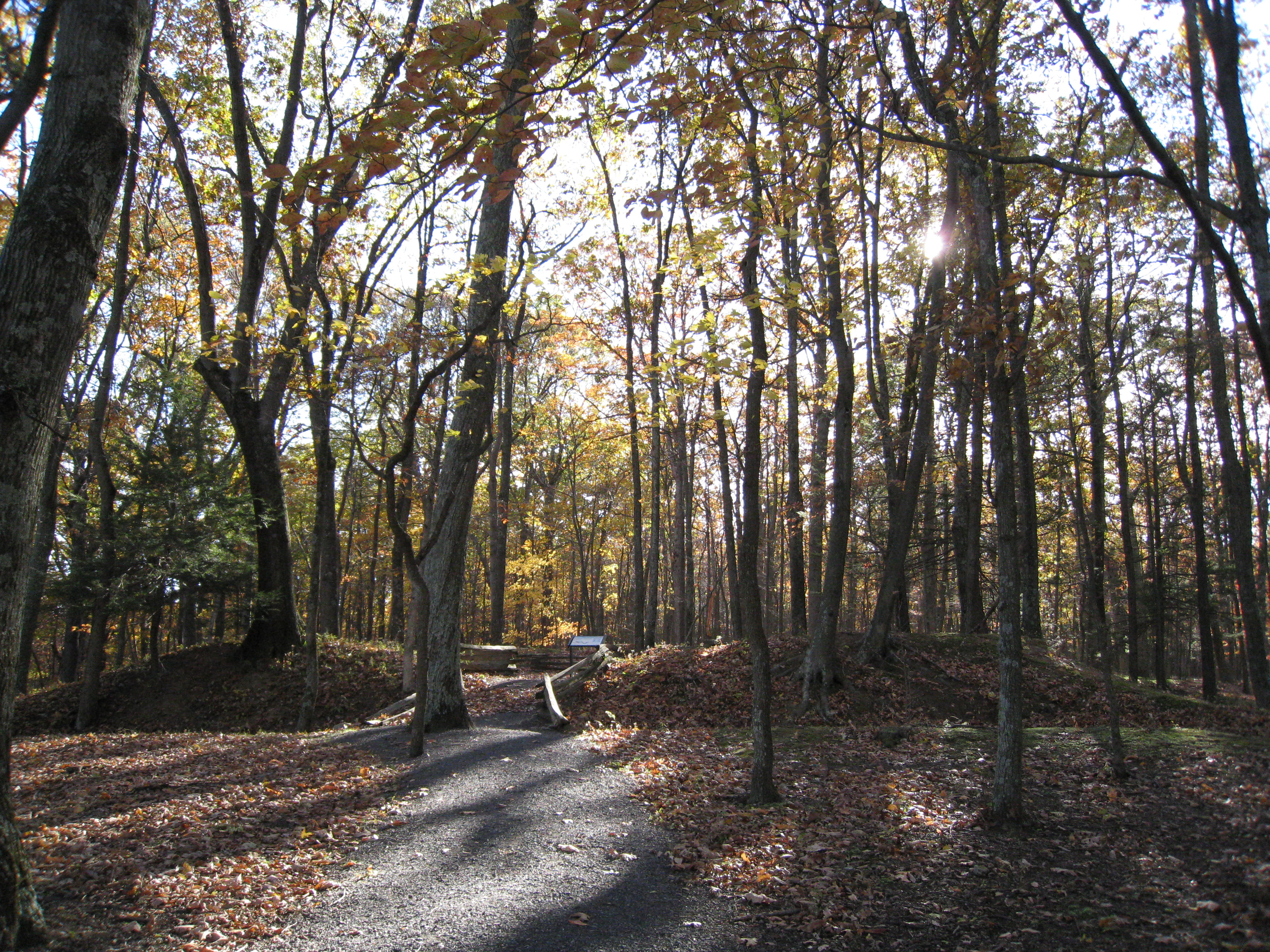

- Location within Eastern Panhandle of West Virginia Location within West Virginia Location within the United States
- Location: Fort Mill Ridge Rd., Romney, West Virginia
- Coordinates: 39°19′28″N 78°47′37″W
- Area: 201 acres (81 ha)
- Built: c. 1861-1862
- NRHP reference No.: 13001121
- Added to NRHP: January 22, 2014

The Fort Mill Ridge Civil War Trenches are battle trenches in West Virginia, United States, that were originally dug between 1861 and 1862 to be later used in 1863 for the American civil war. These trenches were lined with chestnut logs by the Confederate artillery during the American Civil War to defend the approaches to Romney on the Northwestern Turnpike and the South Branch Potomac River. The trenches were then refurbished between March and June 1863 by the 54th Pennsylvania Infantry and the 1st West Virginia Infantry. When Colonel Jacob M. Campbell (54th PVI) garrisoned Union forces at Romney, camps were set up at nearby at Mechanicsburg Gap. The Confederates might have created these trenches but all throughout the war the Union had control of these trenches.

The Fort Mill Ridge trenches are believed to be the best preserved battle trenches dating from the Civil War in existence. The trenches are located three miles southwest of Romney adjacent to the Fort Mill Ridge Wildlife Management Area off of the Northwestern Turnpike (U.S. Route 50/West Virginia Route 28).

This place is significant not only because of the battle that took place but also for the military engineering. The engineering style the Confederates used is an excellent example of a "rammed earth fortification" which protected transportation routes as well. Also, this brought a new era to warfare and a new style of fighting in trenches rather than on an open field. It provided more protection and defense than the offensive strategy of fighting. The defensive method was used so the transports can pass by safely.

It was listed on the National Register of Historic Places in 2014.

== See also ==
- List of historic sites in Hampshire County, West Virginia
