= Nathaniel and Isaac Kuykendall House =

Historic house in West Virginia, United States

- U.S. National Register of Historic Places
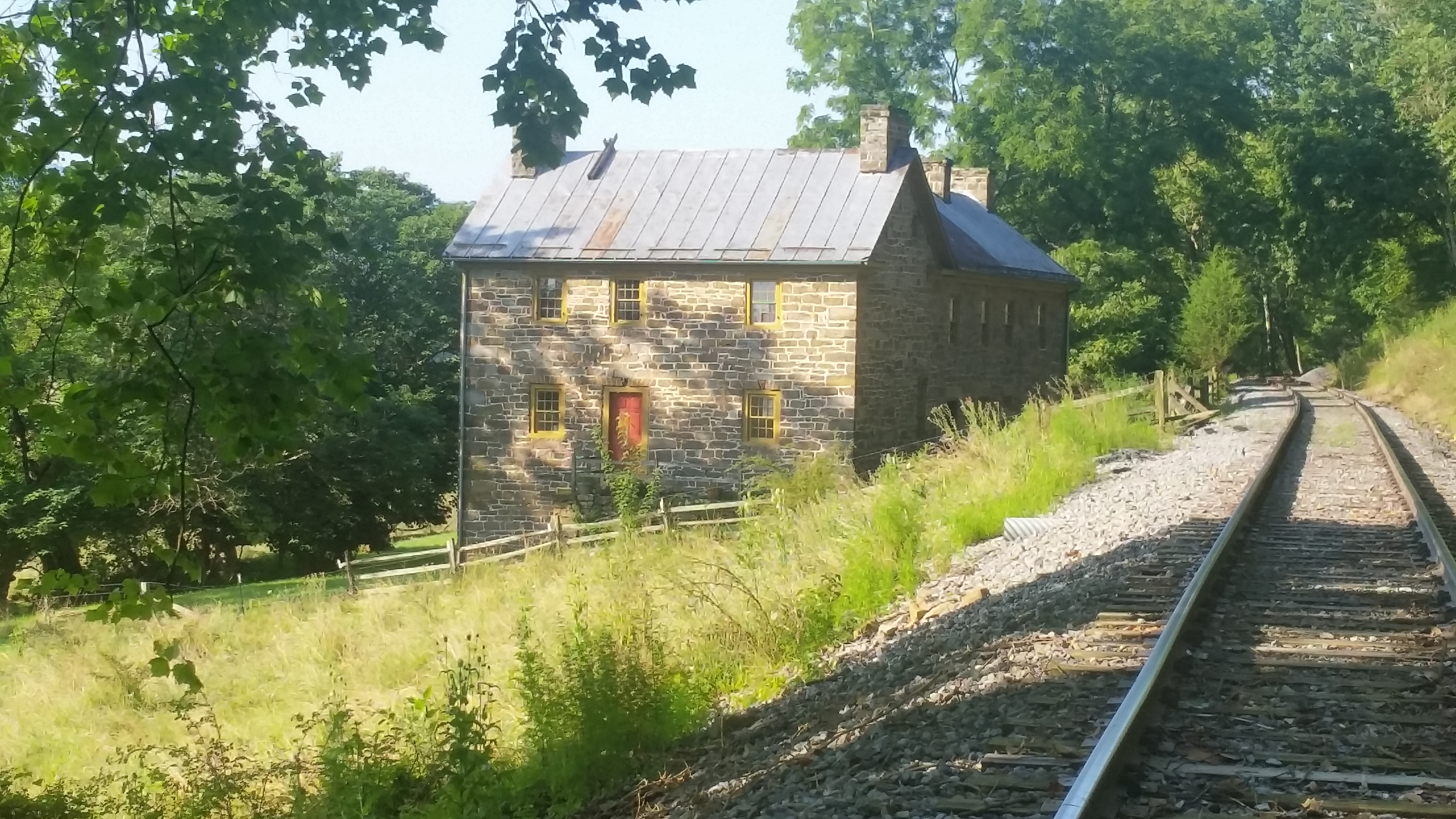

- Location within Eastern Panhandle of West Virginia Location within West Virginia Location within the United States
- Nearest city: Romney, West Virginia
- Coordinates: 39.297846°N 78.810921°W
- Built: 1789, 1826
- Architectural style: Federal, Greek Revival
- NRHP reference No.: 14001058
- Added to NRHP: December 16, 2014

The Nathaniel and Isaac Kuykendall House is a historic house in rural Hampshire County, West Virginia, near the city of Romney. It is a two-story stone structure, built in 1789 and enlarged in 1826. The builders, Nathaniel Kuykendall and his son Isaac, were migrants of Dutch origin from New York, and the house they built is architecturally unusual for its Dutch-influenced Federal and Greek Revival architecture, and for its use of stone, at a time when most houses in the area were of log constructions.

It was listed on the National Register of Historic Places in 2014.
