= Augusta, West Virginia =

Unincorporated community in West Virginia, United States

- Unincorporated community
- Location of Augusta in West Virginia Augusta (West Virginia) Augusta (the United States)
- Coordinates: 39°17.7′N 78°38.3′W
- Country: United States
- State: West Virginia
- County: Hampshire
- Elevation: 1,299 ft (396 m)
- Time zone: UTC-5 (Eastern (EST))
  - Summer (DST): UTC-4 (EDT)
- ZIP code: 26704
- Area code: 304
- GNIS feature ID: 1535081

Augusta is an unincorporated community in central Hampshire County, West Virginia, United States. It is located along the Northwestern Turnpike (U.S. Route 50) at the northern terminus of Augusta-Ford Hill Road (County Route 7) between Shanks and Pleasant Dale, east of Romney. According to the 2000 census, the Augusta community has a population of 4,728.

== Historic site ==
- French's Mill (1911), Augusta-Ford Hill Road (CR 7)
