= Three Churches, West Virginia =

- Unincorporated community
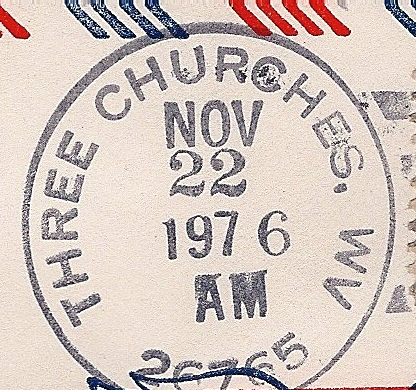
- Three Churches, West Virginia Postmark

- Location within West Virginia Location within the United States
- Coordinates: 39°24′3″N 78°39′15″W
- Country: United States
- State: West Virginia
- County: Hampshire
- Time zone: UTC-5 (Eastern (EST))
  - Summer (DST): UTC-4 (EDT)
- GNIS feature ID: 1555808

Three Churches is an unincorporated community in Hampshire County in the U.S. state of West Virginia. The town is located north of Romney along Jersey Mountain Road (West Virginia Secondary Route 5) at a crossroads with Three Churches Hollow Road (West Virginia Secondary Route 5/4). Originally known as Jersey Mountain, Three Churches were renamed for the three historic white wooden churches located there: Mount Bethel Church, Mount Bethel Primitive Baptist Church, and Branch Mountain United Methodist Church. The Three Churches Post Office is no longer in service.

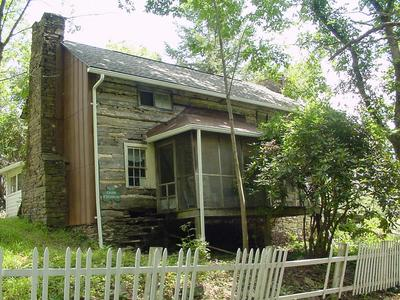
Scanlon Log House

== Historic sites ==
- Branch Mountain United Methodist Church - The last remaining active church will close on June 30, 2012. The Cemetery Association will keep the building available for weddings, funerals, and special community services. The phone number is listed on the sign outside of the church.
- Mount Bethel Church - Hampshire County's oldest standing house of worship.
- Mount Bethel Primitive Baptist Church
- Scanlon Log House - Listed on the National Register of Historic Places.

== Active organizations in the area ==
- Jersey Mountain Ruritan Club
