= Capon Bridge, West Virginia =

- Town
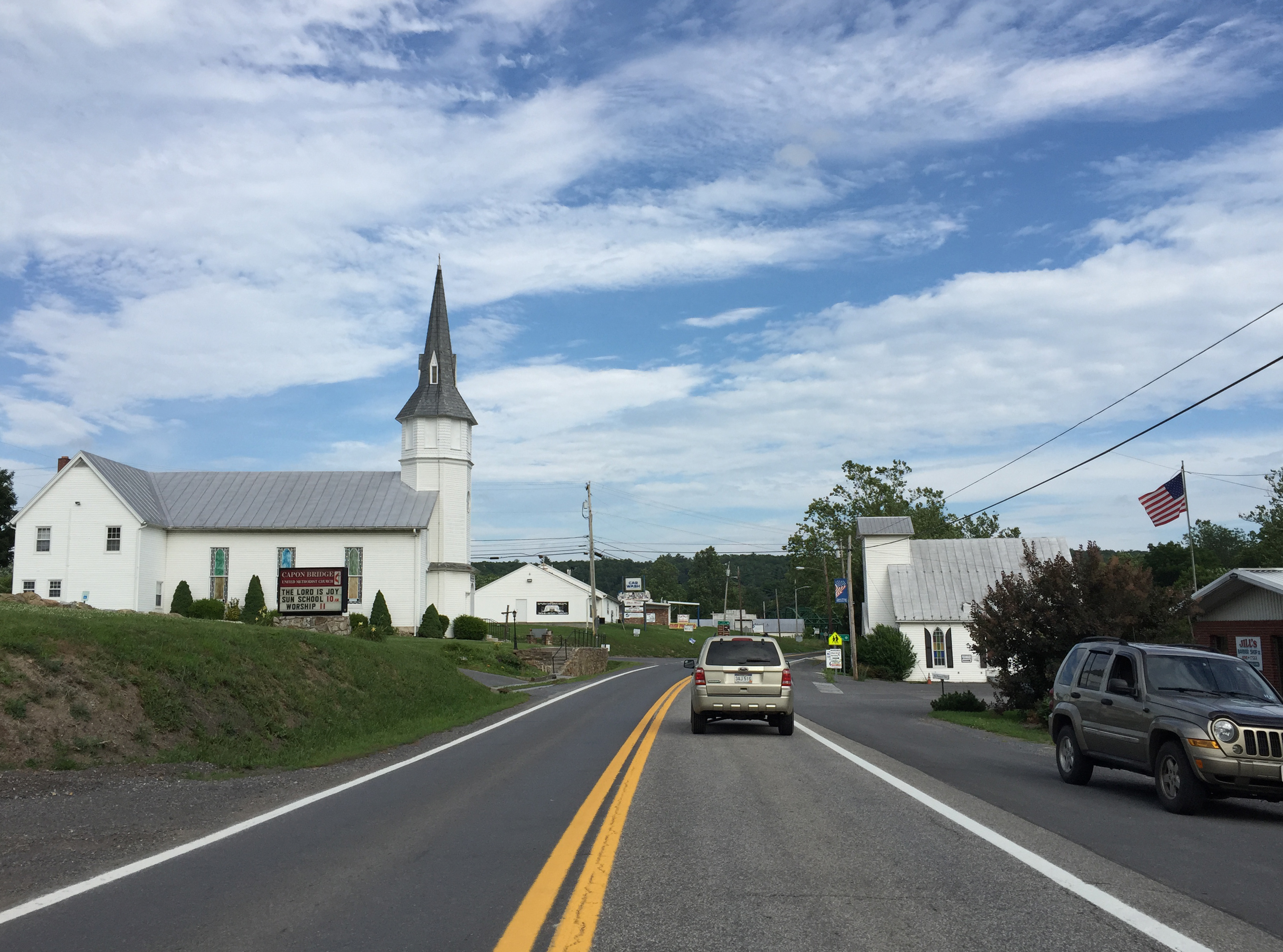
- Northwestern Pike (US 50) in Capon Bridge

- Location of Capon Bridge in Hampshire County, West Virginia
- Coordinates: 39°18′00″N 78°26′03″W
- Country: United States
- State: West Virginia
- County: Hampshire

Government
  - Mayor: Laura Turne

Area
  - Total: 0.73 sq mi (1.90 km^{2})
  - Land: 0.71 sq mi (1.83 km^{2})
  - Water: 0.027 sq mi (0.07 km^{2})
- Elevation: 804 ft (245 m)

Population (2020)
  - Total: 420
  - Estimate (2021): 425
  - Density: 517.7/sq mi (199.88/km^{2})
- Time zone: UTC-5 (EST)
  - Summer (DST): UTC-4 (EDT)
- ZIP code: 26711
- Area code: 304
- FIPS code: 54-13108
- GNIS feature ID: 2390769
- Website: townofcaponbridge.wv.gov/Pages/default.aspx

Capon Bridge is a town in eastern Hampshire County, West Virginia, United States, along the Northwestern Turnpike (U.S. Route 50), approximately 20 miles (32 km) west of Winchester, Virginia. The population was 418 at the 2020 census.

== History ==
Originally known as "Glencoe", Capon Bridge was incorporated in 1902 by the Hampshire County Circuit Court. It is named because of the construction of the bridge over the Cacapon River at that place, with the name of the river being derived from the Shawnee Cape-cape-de-hon, meaning "river of medicine water".

== Geography ==
Capon Bridge is located in eastern Hampshire County. U.S. Route 50 leads east 3 miles (5 km) to the Virginia and 19 miles (31 km) to the center of Winchester, Virginia. To the west, US 50 leads 22 miles (35 km) to Romney, the Hampshire county seat.

According to the United States Census Bureau, the town has a total area of 0.70 square miles (1.81 km^{2}), of which 0.67 square miles (1.74 km^{2}) are land and 0.03 square miles (0.08 km^{2}) are water.

== Transportation ==
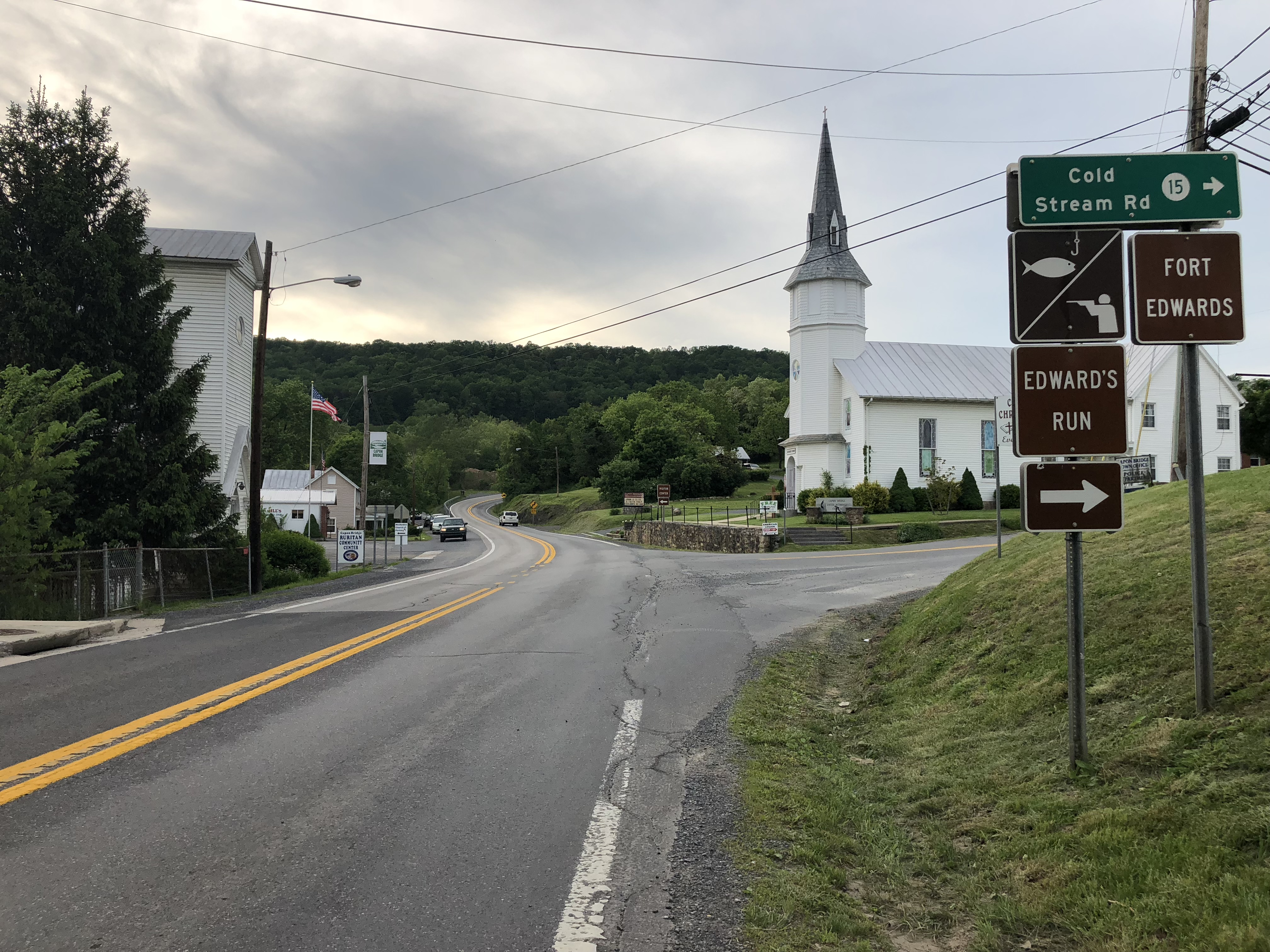
US 50 westbound at CR 15 in Capon Bridge

The only primary highway serving Capon Bridge is U.S. Route 50. From Capon Bridge, US 50 heads eastward to Winchester and Interstate 81, while to the west, it travels through Romney to a junction with U.S. Route 220.

== Demographics ==
Historical population
Census	Pop.	Note	%±
1910	213		—
1920	157		−26.3%
1930	192		22.3%
1940	201		4.7%
1950	223		10.9%
1960	198		−11.2%
1970	211		6.6%
1980	191		−9.5%
1990	192		0.5%
2000	200		4.2%
2010	355		77.5%
2020	420		18.3%
2021 (est.)	425	▲	1.2%
U.S. Decennial Census

=== 2010 census ===
As of the census of 2010, there were 355 people, 156 households, and 96 families living in the town. The population density was 529.9 inhabitants per square mile (204.6/km^{2}). There were 180 housing units at an average density of 268.7 per square mile (103.7/km^{2}). The racial makeup of the town was 96.9% White, 1.7% African American, 0.6% from other races, and 0.8% from two or more races. Hispanic or Latino of any race were 3.1% of the population.

There were 156 households, of which 33.3% had children under the age of 18 living with them, 41.0% were married couples living together, 12.8% had a female householder with no husband present, 7.7% had a male householder with no wife present, and 38.5% were non-families. 32.7% of all households were made up of individuals, and 12.8% had someone living alone who was 65 years of age or older. The average household size was 2.28 and the average family size was 2.89.

The median age in the town was 33.9 years. 27% of residents were under the age of 18; 6% were between the ages of 18 and 24; 31% were from 25 to 44; 20.8% were from 45 to 64; and 15.2% were 65 years of age or older. The gender makeup of the town was 51.5% male and 48.5% female.

=== 2000 census ===
As of the census of 2000, there were 200 people, 91 households, and 56 families living in the town. The population density was 354.1 inhabitants per square mile (136.7/km^{2}). There were 110 housing units at an average density of 194.8 per square mile (75.2/km^{2}). The racial makeup of the town was 98.50% White, 1.00% African American, and 0.50% from two or more races.

There were 91 households, out of which 25.3% had children under the age of 18 living with them, 44.0% were married couples living together, 13.2% had a female householder with no husband present, and 37.4% were non-families. 33.0% of all households were made up of individuals, and 13.2% had someone living alone who was 65 years of age or older. The average household size was 2.20 and the average family size was 2.65.

In the town, the population was spread out, with 22.0% under the age of 18, 10.0% from 18 to 24, 26.0% from 25 to 44, 22.5% from 45 to 64, and 19.5% who were 65 years of age or older. The median age was 38 years. For every 100 females, there were 94.2 males. For every 100 females age 18 and over, there were 79.3 males.

The median income for a household in the town was $30,750, and the median income for a family was $40,000. Males had a median income of $30,000 versus $22,188 for females. The per capita income for the town was $19,457. About 12.1% of families and 17.4% of the population were below the poverty line, including 30.2% of those under the age of eighteen and 19.0% of those 65 or over.

== Historic sites ==
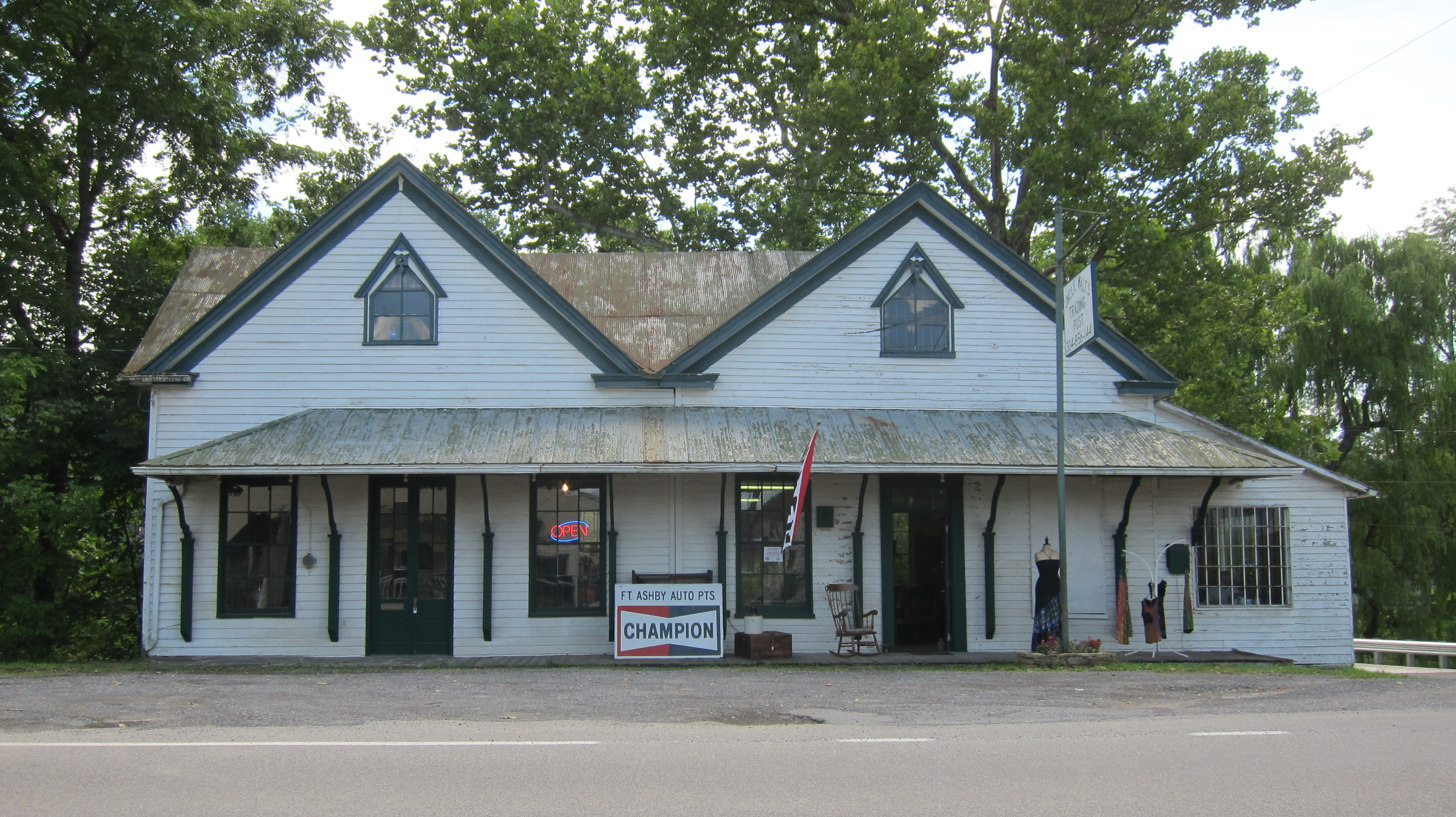
3121 Northwestern Pike

- Amos Pugh Home, Northwestern Pike (U.S. Route 50)
- Capon Chapel Baptist Church & Cemetery, Christian Church Road (CR 13)
- Fort Edwards Site, Cold Stream Road (CR 15)
- Frye's Inn (c. 1800), Northwestern Pike (U.S. Route 50)
- Hook's Tavern (1790), Northwestern Pike (U.S. Route 50)
- Monroe Cemetery (18th Century), Christian Church Road (CR 13)
- Moss Rock Inn, Cacapon River Road (CR 14)
- Parks Home
- Burgundy Center for Wildlife Studies
- Capon Bridge Rocks
- 3121 Northwestern Pike (Old General Store), Northwestern Pike (U.S. Route 50)
- Listed in the National Register of Historic Places on January 9, 2026: The Capon Bridge, US Route 50 over the Cacapon River, Capon Bridge, Hampshire County, WV. This honorary designation recognizes this cultural resource's significant contribution to West Virginia's history.
