= Okonoko, West Virginia =

- Unincorporated community
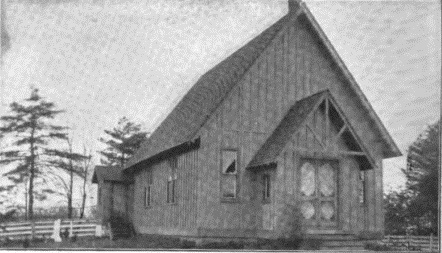
- Epiphany Episcopal Church (c. 1900) in Okonoko

- Location within Eastern Panhandle of West Virginia Location within West Virginia Location within the United States
- Coordinates: 39°31′23″N 78°31′31″W
- Country: United States
- State: West Virginia
- County: Hampshire
- Magisterial district: Gore; Springfield
- Post office established: 1843
- Elevation: 568 ft (173 m)
- Time zone: UTC-5 (Eastern (EST))
  - Summer (DST): UTC-4 (EDT)
- ZIP codes: 25434
- GNIS feature ID: 1555261

Okonoko is an unincorporated community in Hampshire County in the U.S. state of West Virginia. Okonoko is located in northern Hampshire County, along the Potomac River and the CSX Cumberland Subdivision of the former Baltimore and Ohio Railroad.

Originally known as Cacaponville due to its proximity to the Little Cacapon River, the community's post office was established in 1843 and its name was changed to Okonoko in 1853. By 1885, the community's population numbered around 50, and it grew to around 100 in 1898 and 1899. Okonoko's post office remained in operation until it was discontinued in 1958, with its mail routed through nearby Paw Paw, West Virginia.

== Geography and setting ==
Okonoko is located in the northern part of Hampshire County, West Virginia, along the Potomac River and the CSX Cumberland Subdivision, where the river is joined by streams from Miller and Brights Hollows. The community is centered along Okonoko Road (West Virginia Secondary Route 5/6), at the northern edge of forested mountain ridges, where Miller and Brights Hollows open into the Potomac River valley. According to an 1885 article in the South Branch Intelligencer, two of these mountain ridges were known locally as Mount Sinai and Levels Peak. The mouth of Town Creek is located 1 mile (1.6 km) west of Okonoko, and the mouth of the Little Cacapon River is located 1.7 miles (2.7 km) to the east.

Okonoko is positioned at an elevation of 173 metres (568 ft). The unincorporated community of Little Cacapon is located approximately 1.7 miles (2.7 km) east of Okonoko, the unincorporated community of Levels is located approximately 3.1 miles (5.0 km) to its southwest, and the town of Paw Paw is located approximately 3.5 miles (5.6 km) to its east. Okonoko is accessible from Levels, Little Cacapon, and Paw Paw via Okonoko Road. The Chesapeake and Ohio Canal and the Chesapeake and Ohio Canal National Historical Park are located directly across the Potomac River from Okonoko, in Maryland.

== History ==
On February 14, 1838, the Baltimore and Ohio Railroad decided to extend its main line west from Harpers Ferry to Cumberland, Maryland, through Virginia (present-day West Virginia). From November 1838 to April 1839, the railroad conducted location surveys between Harpers Ferry and Cumberland, and the railroad commenced construction of its extension from Harpers Ferry in August 1839. On November 3, 1842, the Baltimore and Ohio Railroad officially opened its main line extension to Cumberland. Following the arrival of the railroad, present-day Okonoko developed into a thriving railroad town. Across the river from present-day Okonoko, the Chesapeake and Ohio Canal was formally opened to trade with Cumberland, on October 10, 1850.

Postmaster	Appointment
Nathaniel Scrogin	April 1, 1843 (Note: Scrogin served in this position through 1845 and 1847.)
Jacob Wickard	(Note: Wickard served in this position through 1849, 1851, and 1853.)
Hiram Michael	June 23, 1856
Henry Berwinkle	December 1865
C. W. Hampton	
W. H. Russel	March 1873
Lawrence P. Miller	May 1900 (Note: While Miller was appointed in May 1900, he was commissioned as postmaster in July 1900.)

The community of Okonoko was originally known as Cacaponville because of its adjacency to the mouth of the Little Cacapon River on the Potomac River, which is approximately 1.7 miles (2.7 km) to the community's east. The United States Post Office Department established a post office at Cacaponville on March 18, 1843, and its name was changed to Okonoko on June 6, 1853. The name Okonoko is derived from the Native American word "Macocanoco", which means "there are high peaks, or ridges". Okonoko is also a palindrome. The post office at Okonoko was discontinued on June 12, 1856, and it was reestablished on June 23, 1856, with Hiram Michael appointed as its postmaster.

During the American Civil War, Okonoko was the scene of an attempted raid on a Baltimore and Ohio Railroad train by Confederate raiders. On the night of April 10, 1864, shortly before the arrival of an east-bound express train, four privates of Company K, 54th Pennsylvania Infantry Regiment, were patrolling the road between Baltimore and Ohio Railroad stations. The soldiers spotted a light on or near the railroad tracks, and after being hailed by the light, the soldiers announced that they were Union Army. The Union soldiers then received volley fire from a Confederate cavalry force numbering 27 personnel, resulting in the wounding of two of the four Union soldiers—one of whom died shortly after their transport to Cumberland.

Okonoko's post office was again discontinued, and was reestablished in December 1865 with the appointment of Henry Berwinkle as its postmaster. The post office was then discontinued on July 1, 1867, and it was reestablished on March 31, 1868. A postal route from Okonoko transported mail to the post offices at Levels, Points, Higginsville, and Slanesville.

In February 1885, a young woman named Mary Cox, who resided near Okonoko and Little Cacapon, was administered two doses of morphine while ill, was mistakenly declared dead, and was subsequently buried alive. Following the declaration of her death, Cox's body was prepared for burial, and she was buried two days later. An attendee at Cox's funeral insisted Cox was not dead and asked for a physician to be called; however, the attendee's request was not heeded and Cox was interred. On the night of her burial, dogs from a residence near the cemetery remained stationed at her burial site and howled persistently. The following day, neighbors opened the grave to discover that Cox had been buried alive and had endured a frightful struggle to release herself from the casket, before dying. Cox's burial resulted in Okonoko's mention in newspaper articles across the United States.

By October 1885, Okonoko's population numbered around 50, with the residents primarily employed by the Baltimore and Ohio Railroad. At that time, Okonoko consisted of residential dwellings located between the hillside to the south and the railroad's double tracks and a siding to the north, with the wagon road positioned within the remaining space along the Potomac River. The community stretched along the railroad and river for approximately 1 mile (1.6 km) in this arrangement. In November 1885, the Epiphany Episcopal Church, Okonoko Mission, was organized by the Episcopal Diocese of West Virginia to serve the Okonoko community. Church services initially occurred in the Methodist Episcopal Church at Levels, until the Epiphany Episcopal Church building in Okonoko was completed in 1888 and consecrated in 1889. By 1898 and 1899, Okonoko had approximately 100 residents.

In 1901, Okonoko's station on the Baltimore and Ohio Railroad was a shipping point for the nearby L. P. Miller and Brothers orchard, which was one of Hampshire County's three large commercial peach orchards at that time. That year, 84 baskets of peaches, weighing 2,560 pounds (1,160 kg), were shipped from Okonoko station. By 1909, shipments of the local peach crop had become a principal source of revenue for the railroad station at Okonoko. In September of that year, L. P. Miller and Brothers orchard shipped an average of two train carloads of peaches daily from the Okonoko station. Peach scab disease caused the L. P. Miller and Brothers orchard to lose half of its peach crop, and in 1908, the company began spraying its peach trees to prevent peach scab. In 1910, the United States Department of Agriculture's Bureau of Plant Industry and Bureau of Entomology performed a fungicide spraying experiment at the L. P. Miller and Brothers orchard to control peach scab. At that time, the orchard was approximately 600 acres (240 ha) and consisted of 12-year-old peach trees. The Department of Agriculture published the experiment's results in its Farmers' Bulletin in 1911. L. P. Miller and Brothers sold the orchard to Potomac-Shenandoah Company in fall 1910, which continued to use Okonoko as its shipment point. Also by 1911, the Appalachian Orchard Company also operated near Okonoko.

On October 21, 1958, the Western Union Telegraph Company applied to the Federal Communications Commission to close its railroad-operated agency office at the Okonoko railroad station, with services transferred to Cumberland, Maryland. Okonoko's post office remained in operation until it was discontinued on October 31, 1958, with its mail routed through nearby Paw Paw in Morgan County. In November 1958, a star route was inaugurated between Paw Paw and Baltimore, which included mail service to Okonoko, Levels, and Points.

=== Floods ===
Due to its location along the Potomac River, Okonoko has suffered a number of significant floods throughout its history. In November 1877, freshet flooding caused significant damage to the Baltimore and Ohio Railroad and Okonoko was described by the South Branch Intelligencer as having been "swept away" by the freshet flooding. In March 1906, flooding at Okonoko brought down telephone poles, thus disabling communications, and prevented crossing of the river between Okonoko and Maryland.

== Bibliography ==
- Brannon, Selden W. (1976). Historic Hampshire: A Symposium of Hampshire County and Its People, Past and Present. Parsons, West Virginia: McClain Printing Company. ISBN 978-0-87012-236-1. OCLC 3121468 – via Internet Archive.
- Davis, Kary Cadmus (April 1902). "Peach Growing in West Virginia". West Virginia Agricultural Experiment Station Bulletin (82). West Virginia University: 389–441. doi:10.33915/agnic.82. S2CID 201590246. Archived from the original on January 25, 2022.
- Dilts, James D. (1993). The Great Road: The Building of the Baltimore and Ohio, The Nation's First Railroad, 1828–1853. Stanford, California: Stanford University Press. ISBN 9780804722353. OCLC 1391553075 – via Internet Archive.
- Episcopal Diocese of West Virginia (1898). Journal of the Twenty-first Annual Council of the Protestant Episcopal Church in the Diocese of West Virginia. Charleston, West Virginia: Butler Printing Company. OCLC 27400559 – via Internet Archive.
- Episcopal Diocese of West Virginia (1899). Journal of the Twenty-second Annual Council of the Protestant Episcopal Church in the Diocese of West Virginia. Charleston, West Virginia: Butler Printing Company. OCLC 27400559 – via Internet Archive.
- Episcopal Diocese of West Virginia (1912). Journal of the Thirty-fifth Annual Council of the Protestant Episcopal Church in the Diocese of West Virginia. Charleston, West Virginia: The Tribune Printing Company. OCLC 27400559 – via Internet Archive.
- Episcopal Diocese of West Virginia (1913). Journal of the Thirty-sixth Annual Council of the Protestant Episcopal Church in the Diocese of West Virginia. Charleston, West Virginia: The Tribune Printing Company. OCLC 27400559 – via Internet Archive.
- Hall, Virginius Cornick Jr. (January 1973). "Virginia Post Offices, 1798-1859". The Virginia Magazine of History and Biography. 81 (1): 49–97. JSTOR 4247768. Archived from the original on April 25, 2023.
- Kenny, Hamill Thomas (1945). West Virginia Place Names: Their Origin and Meaning, Including the Nomenclature of the Streams and Mountains. Piedmont, West Virginia: The Place Name Press. OCLC 404442. Archived from the original on November 30, 2023 – via HathiTrust.
- Kenny, Hamill Thomas (1961). The origin and Meaning of the Indian Place Names of Maryland. Baltimore: Waverly Press. OCLC 619127. Archived from the original on November 26, 2023 – via HathiTrust.
- Maxwell, Hu; Swisher, Howard Llewellyn (1897). History of Hampshire County, West Virginia From Its Earliest Settlement to the Present. Morgantown, West Virginia: A. Brown Boughner, Printer. OCLC 680931891. OL 23304577M – via Internet Archive.
- McMaster, Len (2010a). "Hampshire County West Virginia Post Offices, Part 1" (PDF). La Posta: A Journal of American Postal History. 41 (1). La Posta Publications: 37–46. OCLC 785585746. Archived (PDF) from the original on June 1, 2023.
- McMaster, Len (2010b). "Hampshire County West Virginia Post Offices, Part 2" (PDF). LaPosta: A Journal of American Postal History. 41 (2). La Posta Publications: 38–48. OCLC 785585746. Archived (PDF) from the original on June 1, 2023.
- Morrison, Charles (1971). Wappatomaka: A Survey of the History and Geography of the South Branch Valley. Parsons, West Virginia: McClain Printing Company. ISBN 978-0-87012-107-4. OCLC 222195 – via Internet Archive.
- Munske, Roberta R.; Kerns, Wilmer L., eds. (2004). Hampshire County, West Virginia, 1754–2004. Romney, West Virginia: The Hampshire County 250th Anniversary Committee. ISBN 978-0-9715738-2-6. OCLC 55983178.
- Sanderlin, Walter S. (1976). The Great National Project: A History of the Chesapeake and Ohio Canal. New York: Arno Press. ISBN 9780405080968. OCLC 1391554149 – via Internet Archive.
- Scott, W. M.; Quaintance, A. L. (March 27, 1911). "Spraying Peaches for the Control of Brown-Rot, Scab, and Curculio". Farmers' Bulletin (440). United States Department of Agriculture; Government Printing Office.
- Peterkin, George William (1902). A History and Record of the Protestant Episcopal Church in the Diocese of West Virginia. Charleston, West Virginia: The Tribune Printing Company. OCLC 1046583273 – via Internet Archive.
- United States Civil Service Commission (1843). "Post Office Department". Register of All Officers and Agents, Civil, Military, and Naval, in the Service of the United States. Washington, D.C.: United States Department of State; J. & G. S. Gideon, Printers – via Internet Archive.
- United States Civil Service Commission (1845). "Post Office Department". Register of All Officers and Agents, Civil, Military, and Naval, in the Service of the United States. Washington, D.C.: United States Department of State; J. & G. S. Gideon, Printers. OCLC 1049969522 – via Internet Archive.
- United States Civil Service Commission (1847). "Post Office Department". Register of All Officers and Agents, Civil, Military, and Naval, in the Service of the United States. Washington, D.C.: United States Department of State; J. & G. S. Gideon, Printers. OCLC 1052511673 – via Internet Archive.
- United States Civil Service Commission (1849). "Post Office Department". Register of All Officers and Agents, Civil, Military, and Naval, in the Service of the United States. Washington, D.C.: United States Department of State; Gideon and Co. Printers – via Internet Archive.
- United States Civil Service Commission (1851). "Post Office Department". Register of All Officers and Agents, Civil, Military, and Naval, in the Service of the United States. Washington, D.C.: United States Department of State; Gideon and Co. Printers – via Internet Archive.
- United States Civil Service Commission (1853). "Post Office Department". Register of All Officers and Agents, Civil, Military, and Naval, in the Service of the United States. Washington, D.C.: United States Department of State; Robert Armstrong, Public Printer – via Internet Archive.
