= Little Cacapon Mountain =

Mountain in West Virginia, United States

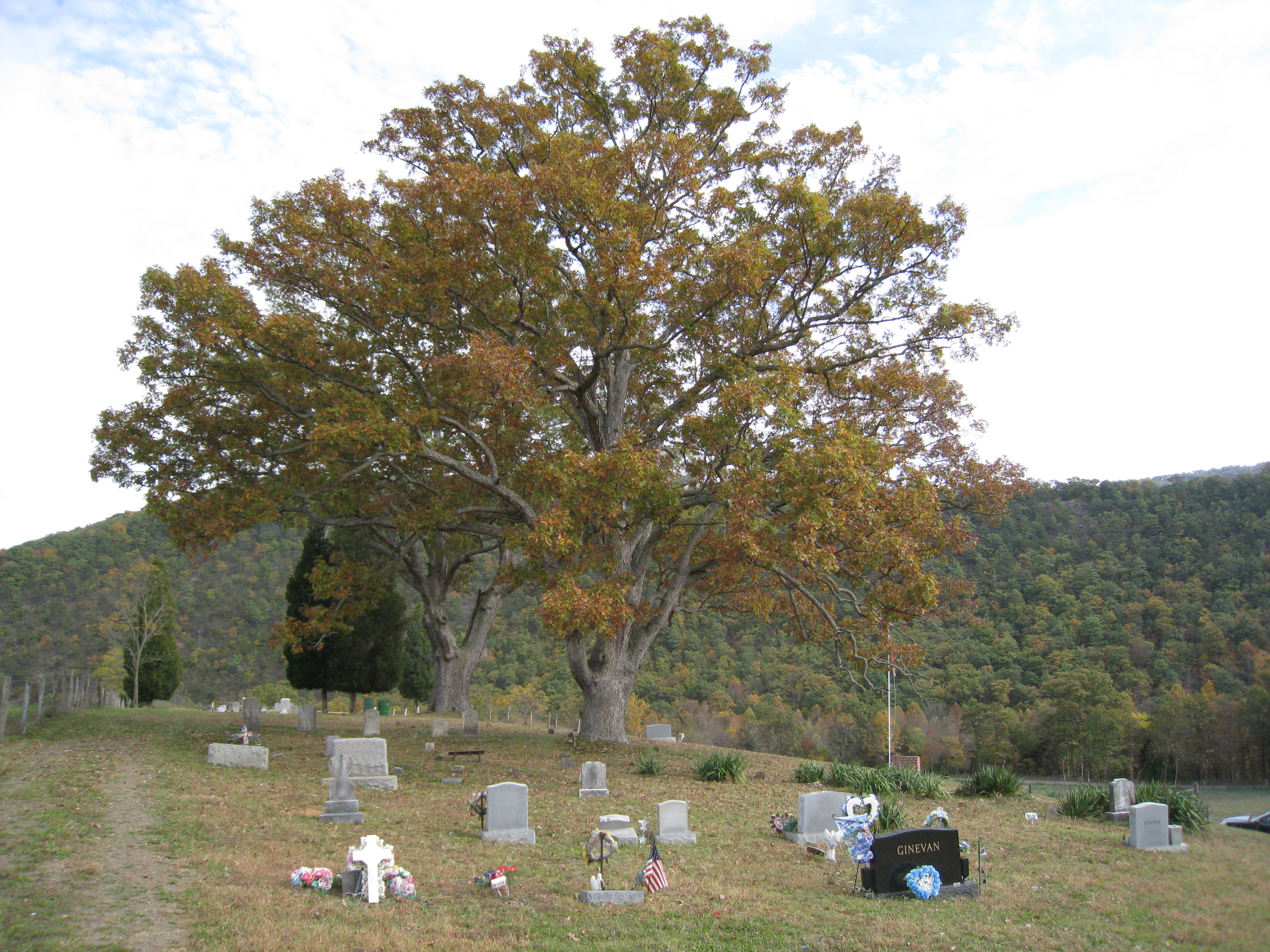
- Little Cacapon Mountain viewed from Ginevan Cemetery near Little Cacapon, West Virginia.

Highest point
- Elevation: 1,575 ft (480 m)
- Coordinates: 39°21′00″N 78°36′37″W

Geography
- Location: Hampshire County. West Virginia, U.S.
- Parent range: Ridge-and-Valley Appalachians
- Topo map(s): USGS Hanging Rock, Levels

Climbing
- Easiest route: Hike, drive

Little Cacapon Mountain (locally /kəˈkeɪpən/ kə-KAY-pən or locally /ˈkeɪpən/ KAY-pən) is a mountain ridge of the Ridge-and-valley Appalachians in Hampshire County, West Virginia, United States. The mountain takes its name from the Little Cacapon River, a Potomac River tributary that lies on its western flanks. Little Cacapon Mountain reaches its highest point of 1,575 feet (480 m) in the vicinity of Barnes Mill. It spans from the Frenchburg area, where it is joined by Chestnut Oak Ridge, to the Slanesville Pike where Crooked Run forms a gap between Little Cacapon Mountain and Queens Ridge near Higginsville.

== Gallery ==
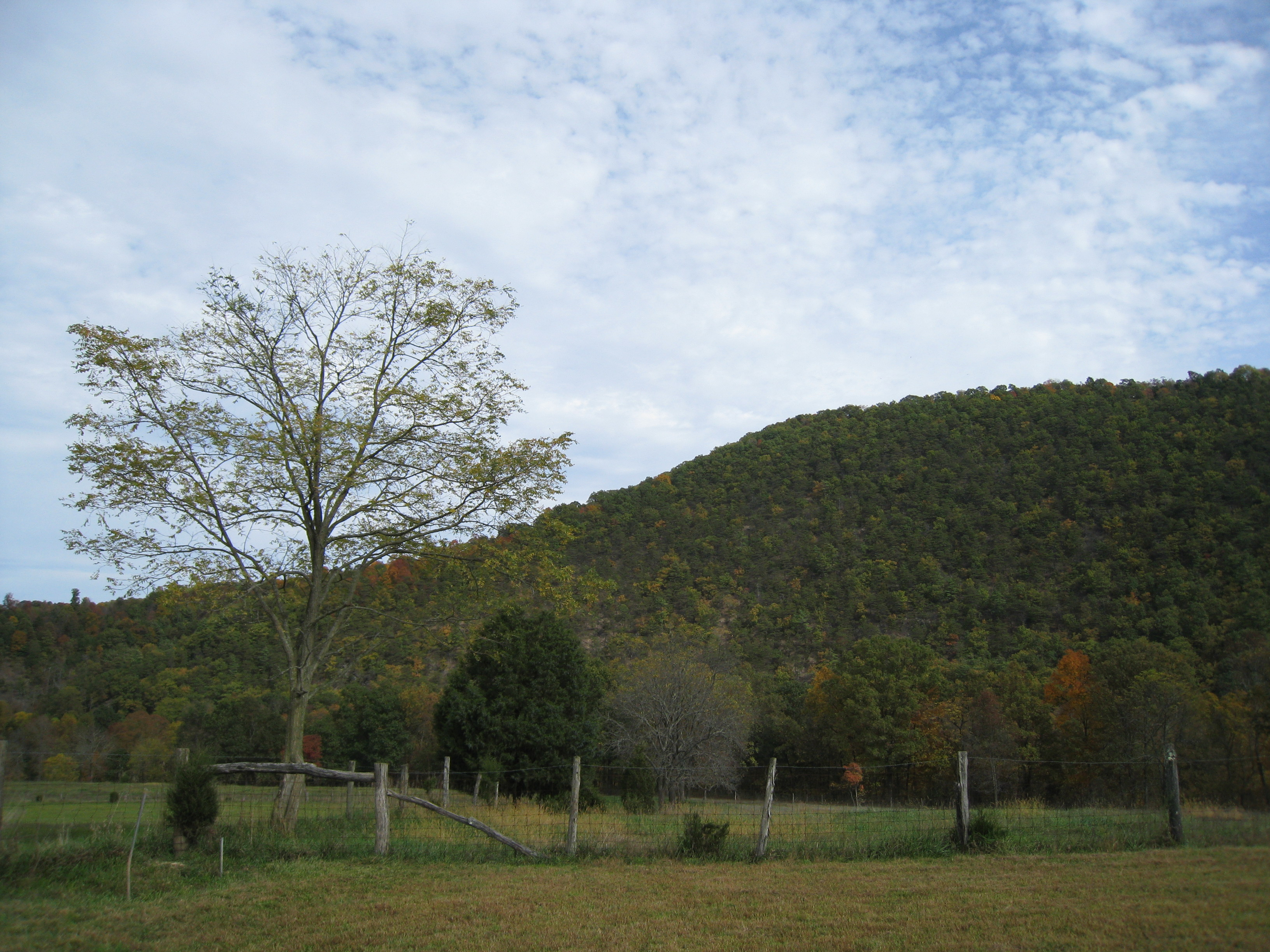
Little Cacapon Mountain viewed from Ginevan Cemetery near Little Cacapon

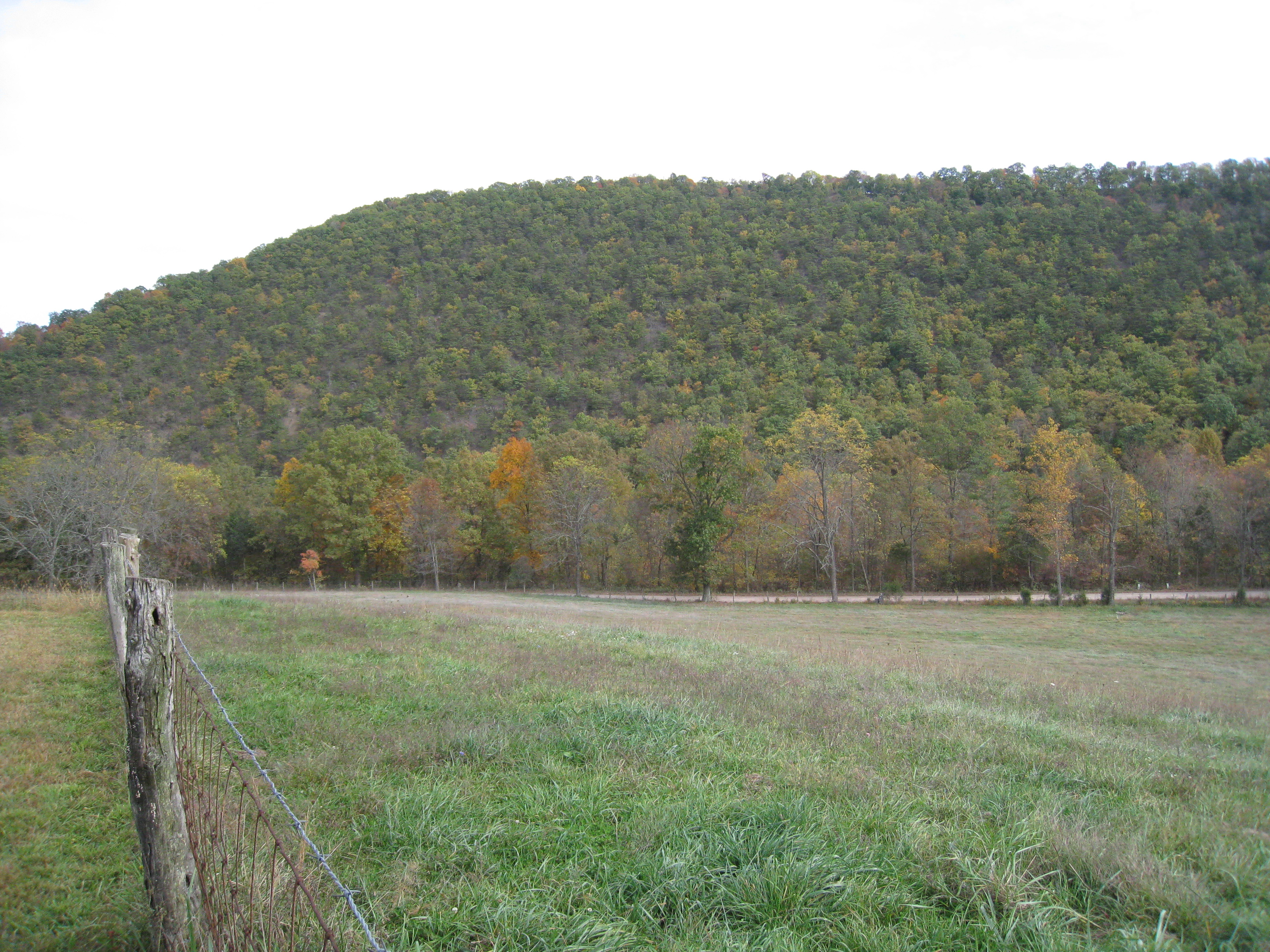
Little Cacapon Mountain viewed from Ginevan Cemetery near Little Cacapon

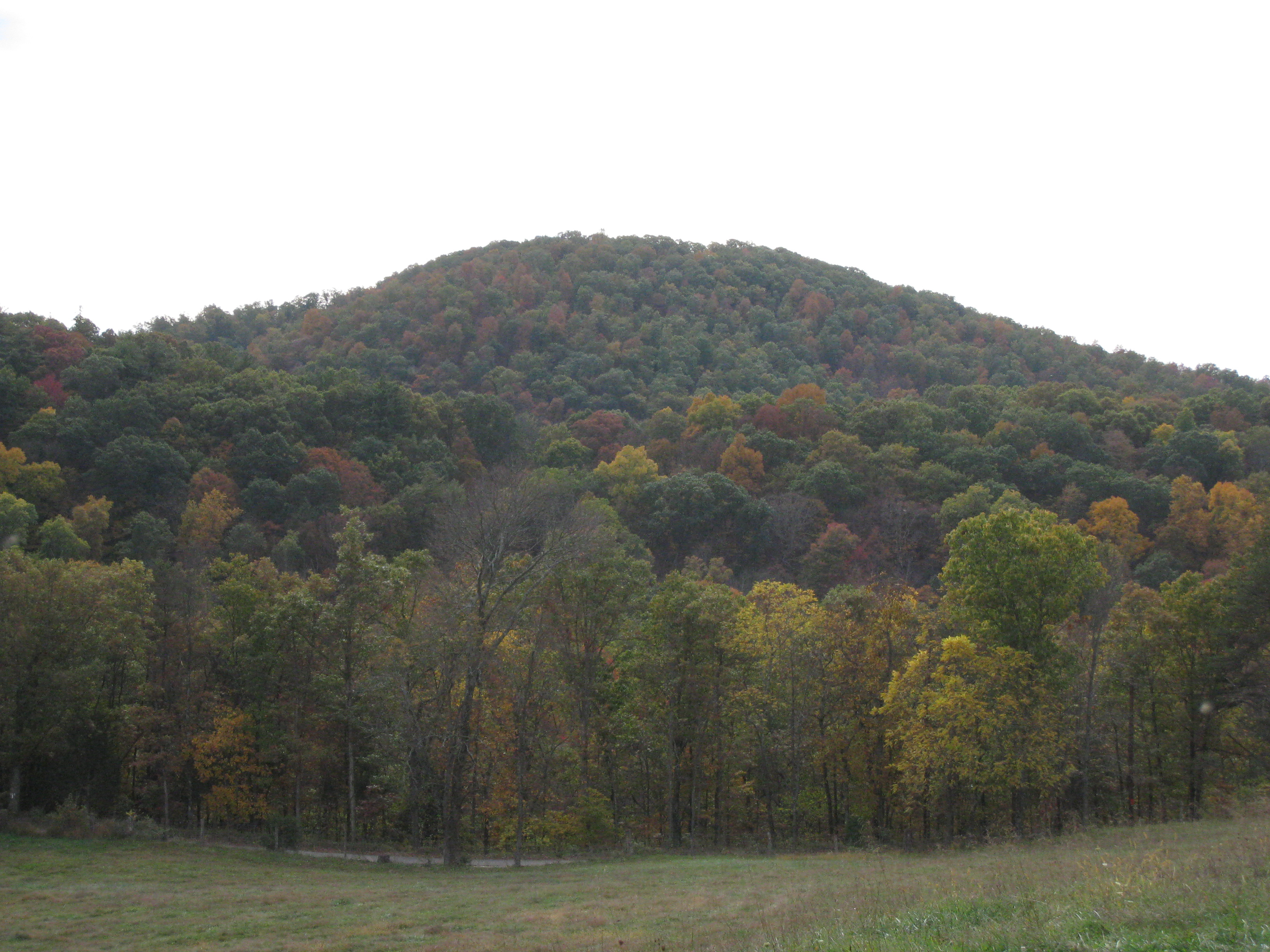
Little Cacapon Mountain viewed from Ginevan Cemetery near Little Cacapon
