= Cacapon =

Cacapon (locally /kəˈkeɪpən/ kə-KAY-pən) is a term of Native American origin that means "medicine waters." It may refer to:

== Buildings and structures ==
- Capon Chapel, a 1750s church in Hampshire County, West Virginia

== Geophysical features ==
- Cacapon Lake, a reservoir in Morgan County, West Virginia
- Cacapon Mountain, a mountain in Morgan and Hampshire counties of West Virginia
- Little Cacapon Mountain, a mountain ridge in Hampshire County, West Virginia
- Cacapon River, a river in the Appalachian Mountains of West Virginia
- Little Cacapon River, a river in Hampshire County, West Virginia

== Parks and recreational places ==
- Cacapon Resort State Park, a state park in Morgan County, West Virginia
- Capon Springs Resort, a resort and spa in Capon Springs, West Virginia

== Populated places ==
- Capon Bridge, West Virginia
- Capon Lake, West Virginia
- Capon Springs, West Virginia
- Great Cacapon, West Virginia
- Little Cacapon, West Virginia
