= Alexander W. Monroe =

American lawyer, politician, and military officer

Honorable Alexander W. Monroe
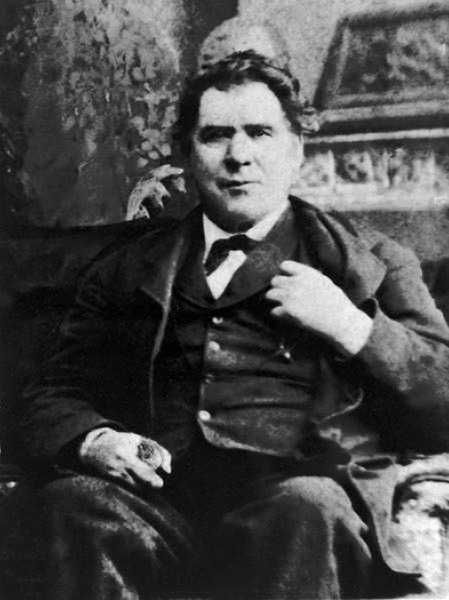
- Alexander W. Monroe as Speaker of the West Virginia House of Delegates in 1875

Speaker of the West Virginia House of Delegates
- In office 1875–1877
- Preceded by: William M. Miller
- Succeeded by: Eustace Gibson

Member of the West Virginia House of Delegates from the Hampshire County district
- In office 1875–1877
- Preceded by: George Deaver, Jr.
- Succeeded by: Asa Hiett
- In office 1879–1883
- Preceded by: Asa Hiett
- Succeeded by: Henry Bell Gilkeson

Member of the Virginia House of Delegates from the Hampshire County district
- In office 1850–1851 Serving with William P. Stump
- Preceded by: Robert Massey Powell; William P. Stump
- Succeeded by: James Allen; Thomas B. White

Personal details
- Born: December 29, 1817 Hampshire County, Virginia (now West Virginia), United States
- Died: March 16, 1905 (aged 87) Hampshire County, West Virginia, United States
- Resting place: Indian Mound Cemetery, Romney, West Virginia
- Party: Democratic Party
- Spouse(s): Sarah A. French (first); Margaret Ellen Pugh (second)
- Relations: Robert Monroe (father); Elizabeth Monroe (mother)
- Children: James W. Monroe; Robert Pugh Monroe; Sallie Elizabeth Monroe Haines; Ellen G. Monroe Tharp; Annie H. Monroe
- Profession: schoolteacher, farmer, lawyer, surveyor, military officer, politician, newspaper editor, and newspaper publisher

Military service
- Allegiance: Confederate States of America
- Branch/service: Confederate States Army
- Years of service: 1861–1865 (CSA)
- Rank: Colonel (114th Regiment, Virginia Militia); Major (18th Virginia Cavalry)
- Commands: 114th Regiment, Virginia Militia; 18th Virginia Cavalry
- Battles/wars: American Civil War

Alexander W. Monroe (December 29, 1817 – March 16, 1905) was a prominent American lawyer, politician, and military officer in the U.S. states of Virginia and West Virginia. Monroe served as a member of the Virginia House of Delegates (1850–1851 and 1862–1865) and West Virginia House of Delegates (1875–1877 and 1879–1883) representing Hampshire County. He was the Speaker of the West Virginia House of Delegates during the 1875–1877 legislative session. Monroe also represented Hampshire County in the West Virginia Constitutional Convention of 1872.

Monroe was born in Hampshire County, Virginia (present-day West Virginia) in 1817. At the age of 18, he and his siblings were orphaned and he became a schoolteacher to provide for the education of his brothers and sisters. He later became a county surveyor, and studied jurisprudence. Monroe was elected to the Virginia House of Delegates (1850–1851), during which time he participated in the 1851 reform of the Constitution of Virginia. He was admitted to the Virginia bar in 1858 and in 1861, he purchased the Virginia Argus and Hampshire Advertiser newspaper, which he operated until the onset of the American Civil War.

In 1861, Monroe commanded the 114th Regiment of the Virginia militia with the rank of colonel; he was the oldest person in that commissioned rank within the state's militia. The 114th Regiment took part in several skirmishes in Hampshire County. Following the regiment's disbandment, Monroe volunteered and raised a battalion of cavalry within the 18th Virginia Volunteer Cavalry Regiment of the regular Confederate States Army. He later commanded the rear guard during the withdrawal of Confederate forces under the command of General Robert E. Lee from the Battle of Gettysburg in 1863, successfully protecting the 27-mile (43 km)-long wagon train. Monroe served in the Virginia House of Delegates throughout the Civil War.

Monroe returned to the practice of law and in 1872 was a participant in the West Virginia Constitutional Convention. From 1875 to 1877, he was a member of the West Virginia House of Delegates and was twice elected speaker. He was the first delegate to represent Hampshire County in both the Virginia General Assembly and the West Virginia Legislature. Monroe was twice appointed as a director of the West Virginia Hospital for the Insane. He again served in the West Virginia House of Delegates from 1879 to 1883. Monroe retired to his farm on the Little Cacapon River and died in 1905.

== Early life and family relations ==
Alexander W. Monroe was born on December 29, 1817, in Hampshire County, Virginia (now West Virginia), and was the oldest child of Robert and Elizabeth Monroe. His parents were of Scottish descent. Monroe's great uncle, Dr. John Monroe, was an early physician and Baptist minister in Hampshire County. Monroe had four younger brothers and two sisters: Robert W. Monroe, James W. Monroe, J. Walker Monroe, Marion Monroe, a Mrs. Snapp, and Sarah Ann Monroe Garrett. His brother, Robert W. Monroe, was later appointed by United States President Grover Cleveland as an Indian agent in Idaho.

At the age of 18, Monroe and his siblings were orphaned, and Monroe took responsibility for the rearing and education of his four younger brothers and two sisters. To accomplish this feat, he taught school during the winter months, and worked the family's farm during the growing season.

== Early professions and political career ==
Monroe studied surveying and began his career in public service as the county surveyor for Hampshire County. During his tenure, he surveyed the majority of the county's land tracts. Monroe read law in Romney under prominent local attorney, Alfred P. White. While studying law, he was elected to represent Hampshire County in the Virginia House of Delegates alongside William P. Stump between 1850 and 1851. Monroe was a member of the Virginia House of Delegates during the 1851 reform of the Constitution of Virginia. In 1857, he was nominated as a Democratic candidate to represent the Hampshire County district in the Senate of Virginia. Monroe was admitted to the Virginia bar in 1858 at the age of 41 and engaged in a law practice in Romney. In 1859, he was elected the Commonwealth's Attorney for Hampshire County.

Monroe and Job N. Cookus purchased the Virginia Argus and Hampshire Advertiser newspaper in Romney in 1861. During their joint ownership, the offices for the Virginia Argus and Hampshire Advertiser were located in an old stone building that formerly housed the Romney Academy behind the Hampshire County Courthouse. Monroe and Cookus continued serving as its editors and publishers until the Union Army closed down the Advertiser's offices in August 1861, after which the newspaper was not revived.

== Military career ==
Following the outbreak of the American Civil War in July 1861, Monroe commanded the 114th Regiment of the Virginia militia with the rank of colonel. At age 43, Monroe was the oldest colonel, by his commission, serving in the Virginia militia.

On October 26, 1861, Monroe's 114th Regiment took part in a skirmish against a unit within the left column formation of Union Army troops under the command of Brigadier General Benjamin Franklin Kelley. The skirmish took place at present-day Blues Beach where a wire bridge carried the Moorefield and North Branch Turnpike across the South Branch Potomac River at the Lower Hanging Rocks. Monroe also led 300 soldiers of the 114th Regiment in the Battle of Blue's Gap on January 7, 1862.

Monroe remained the commanding officer of the 114th Regiment until its disbandment by the Congress of the Confederate States in April 1862. While serving in the Confederate States Army, Monroe completed another term as a member of the Virginia House of Delegates between 1862 and 1865. He participated in the Virginia General Assembly for each legislative session conducted during wartime, returning to his military duties following each session's adjournment.

Following the passage of the Conscription Bill by the Confederate States Congress, Monroe volunteered and raised a battalion of cavalry within the 18th Virginia Volunteer Cavalry Regiment of the regular Confederate States Army. He was elected major of the 18th Virginia Cavalry, which was known as the North Western Brigade, shortly after its creation. While he served in the 18th Virginia Cavalry, it was under the command of Brigadier General John D. Imboden.

Monroe was later in command of the rear guard during the withdrawal of Confederate forces under the command of General Robert E. Lee from the Battle of Gettysburg in 1863. In this capacity, Monroe successfully protected the 27-mile (43 km)-long wagon train. Monroe fought for the Confederate Army throughout the duration of the war, until 1865. Following the war, he was paroled by Union authorities.

== Later political career ==
During the Reconstruction Era, Confederate veterans were initially prohibited from holding public office or from practicing law in West Virginia without taking a test oath. The West Virginia House of Delegates passed a bill in 1868 that allowed Monroe to practice law without having to swear an oath. Following the passage of this bill, he resumed the practice of law in Romney. On February 23, 1871, West Virginia announced an election for delegates to a constitutional convention to update the state’s 1863 constitution. The election for delegates was held in August 1871, and Hampshire County elected Monroe and James Dillon Armstrong. Monroe and Armstrong represented the county at the West Virginia Constitutional Convention in January 1872 in Charleston. In 1875, Monroe returned to politics when he was elected as a Democrat to represent Hampshire County in the West Virginia House of Delegates for one two-year term. It was during this legislative session that Monroe served as Speaker of the West Virginia House of Delegates. He was the first delegate to represent Hampshire County in both the Virginia General Assembly and the West Virginia Legislature.

In March 1875 and a year later in March 1876, he was appointed by Governor John Jeremiah Jacob and the West Virginia Board of Public Works as a director for the West Virginia Hospital for the Insane in Weston. In June 1876 at the state Democratic convention in Charleston, Monroe was selected as a delegate from West Virginia's 2nd congressional district to attend the 1876 Democratic National Convention in St. Louis.

Monroe again served as a member of the House of Delegates representing Hampshire County from 1879 to 1883. He was nominated for the house speakership but lost to George H. Moffet. In 1881, Monroe was a member of the Joint Revisory Committee, which was charged with amending the laws and statutes of the West Virginia Code.

Throughout his political career, Monroe continued to engage in the practice of law in Romney. In 1887 he and Samuel Lightfoot Flournoy were the defense attorneys for Annie Offner, who had been accused of murdering her lover Benjamin Brooks.

== Business pursuits ==
On February 23, 1871, the West Virginia Legislature passed an act incorporating the South Branch Railway Company, responsible for the construction and operation of a branch line connecting Romney with the Baltimore and Ohio Railroad main line at Green Spring. Monroe was named by the legislature as one of the commissioners of the South Branch Railway Company, charged with the responsibility of signing up investors to purchase capital stock in the company.

== Later life and death ==
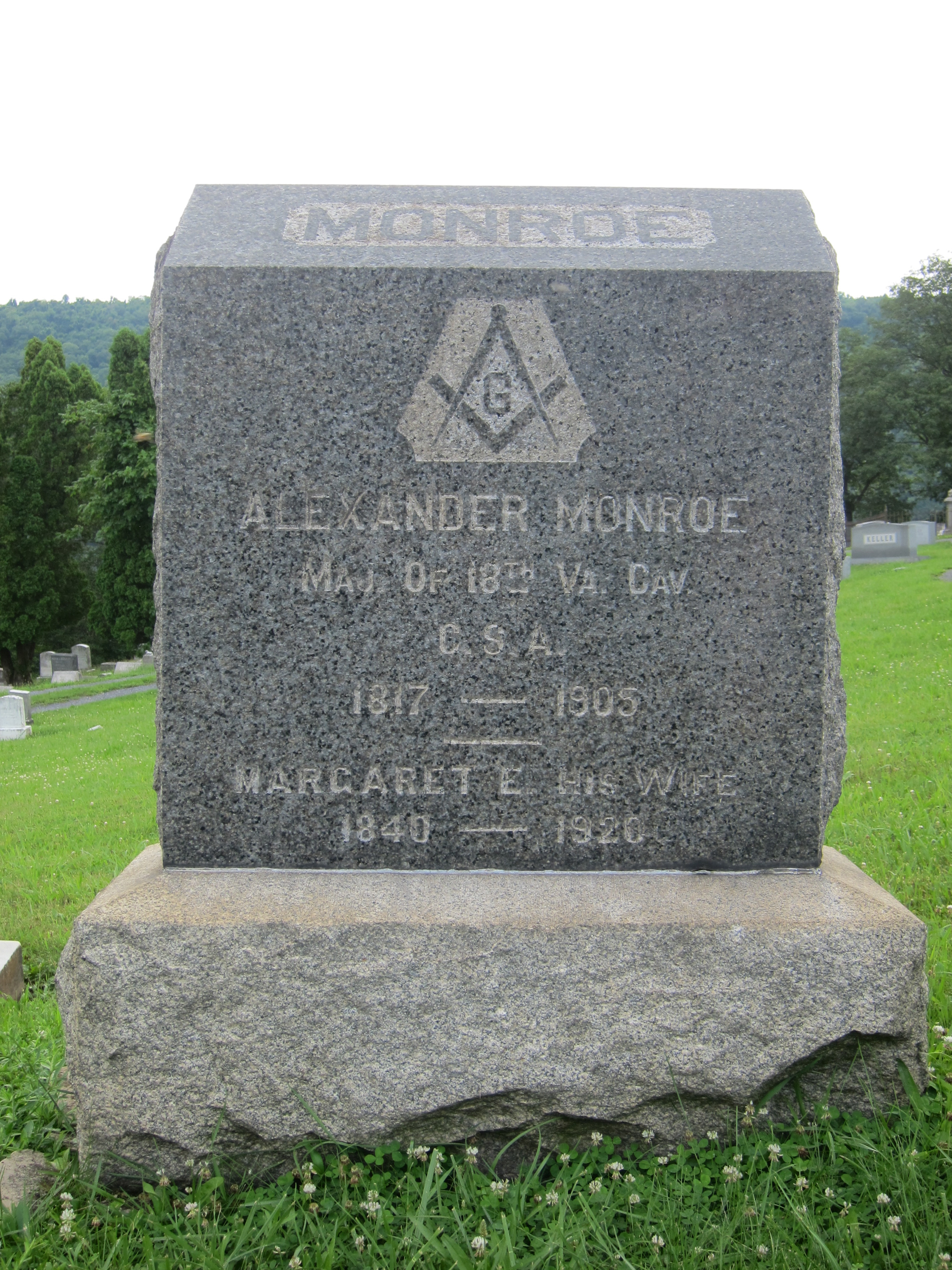
Burial site of Monroe and his wife Margaret in Indian Mound Cemetery

During his later years, Monroe resided on his farm on the Little Cacapon River in the Barnes Mill community of Hampshire County. Monroe succumbed to heart failure and died the night of March 16, 1905, at his home near Romney. Monroe was survived by his second wife Margaret and their four children. Monroe is interred with his wife Margaret at Indian Mound Cemetery in Romney.

== Marriage and children ==
In 1852, Monroe married his first wife, Sarah A. French, daughter of John and Eleanor French. Monroe and his wife Sarah had one son, James W. Monroe. Following Sarah's death, Monroe married his second wife, Margaret Ellen Pugh, daughter of Benjamin and Sarah Pugh, on November 21, 1866. Monroe and Margaret had at least four children:

- Robert Pugh Monroe (October 14, 1867 – 1924), married Elwilda Idelle Kidner on March 20, 1906
- Sallie Elizabeth Monroe Haines (born October 20, 1869), married Charles William Haines on January 31, 1893
- Ellen G. Monroe Tharp, married Wilbur L. Tharp on November 29, 1899
- Annie H. Monroe

== Bibliography ==
- Atkinson, George Wesley; Gibbens, Alvaro Franklin (1890). Prominent Men of West Virginia: Biographical Sketches of Representative Men in Every Honorable Vocation, Including Politics, the Law, Theology, Medicine, Education, Finance, Journalism, Trade, Commerce and Agriculture. Wheeling, West Virginia: W. L. Callin. OCLC 3886825 – via Google Books.
- Blue, John (1994). Daniel P. Oates (ed.). Hanging Rock Rebel: Lt. John Blue's War in West Virginia and the Shenandoah Valley. Shippensburg, Pennsylvania: Burd Street Press. ISBN 978-0-942597-62-2. OCLC 29254746.
- Hinkle, Harlan H. (2003). Grayback Mountaineers: The Confederate Face Of Western Virginia. New York City: iUniverse. ISBN 978-0-595-26840-5. OCLC 52998586. Archived from the original on November 2, 2013 – via Google Books.
- Lewis, Virgil Anson (1889). History of West Virginia. Philadelphia: Hubbard Brothers. OCLC 4270768 – via Internet Archive.
- Maxwell, Hu; Swisher, Howard Llewellyn (1897). History of Hampshire County, West Virginia From Its Earliest Settlement to the Present. Morgantown, West Virginia: A. Brown Boughner, Printer. OCLC 680931891. OL 23304577M.
- Munske, Roberta R.; Kerns, Wilmer L., eds. (2004). Hampshire County, West Virginia, 1754–2004. Romney, West Virginia: The Hampshire County 250th Anniversary Committee. ISBN 978-0-9715738-2-6. OCLC 55983178.
- Virginia State Library Board (1917). Thirteenth Annual Report of the Library Board of the Virginia State Library, 1915–1916. Richmond, Virginia: Davis Bottom, Superintendent of Public Printing. OCLC 7912944. Archived from the original on January 5, 2014 – via Google Books.
- Ritter, Charles F.; Wakelyn, Jon L. (1989). American Legislative Leaders, 1850–1910. Westport, Connecticut: Greenwood Press. ISBN 978-0-313-23943-4. OCLC 243439568. Archived from the original on October 31, 2013 – via Google Books.
- Wallace, Lee A. (1986). A Guide to Virginia Military Organizations, 1861–1865. Lynchburg, Virginia: H. E. Howard, Inc. ISBN 9780930919306. OCLC 709532328. Archived from the original on November 3, 2013 – via Google Books.
- West Virginia Legislature (1871). Acts of the Legislature of West Virginia; At Its Ninth Session, Commencing January 17th, 1871. Charleston, West Virginia: H. S. Walker, Public Printer. OCLC 422695120. Archived from the original on October 31, 2013 – via Google Books.
- West Virginia Legislature (1922). John T. Harris, Clerk of the West Virginia Senate (ed.). West Virginia Legislative Hand Book and Manual and Official Register. Charleston, West Virginia: Tribune Printing Company. OCLC 9771361. Archived from the original on April 30, 2016 – via Google Books.

West Virginia House of Delegates
Preceded by William M. Miller	Speaker of the West Virginia House of Delegates; 1875–1877	Succeeded by Eustace Gibson
Preceded by George Deaver, Jr.	Member of the West Virginia House of Delegates from Hampshire County; 1875–1877	Succeeded by Asa Hiett
Preceded by Asa Hiett	Member of the West Virginia House of Delegates from Hampshire County; 1879–1883	Succeeded by Henry Bell Gilkeson
Virginia House of Delegates
Preceded by Robert Massey Powell; William P. Stump	Member of the Virginia House of Delegates from Hampshire County; 1850–1851; Served alongside: William P. Stump	Succeeded by James Allen; Thomas B. White
