= Hainesville, West Virginia =

Hainesville is the name of several communities in the U.S. state of West Virginia.

- Hainesville, Berkeley County, West Virginia
- Hainesville, Hampshire County, West Virginia
