= Hainesville, Hampshire County, West Virginia =

- Unincorporated community
- Location within West Virginia Location within the United States
- Coordinates: 39°21′29″N 78°34′2″W
- Country: United States
- State: West Virginia
- County: Hampshire
- Time zone: UTC-5 (Eastern (EST))
  - Summer (DST): UTC-4 (EDT)
- GNIS feature ID: 1718643

Hainesville is an unincorporated community in north-central Hampshire County, West Virginia, United States. It is situated at the crossroads of Old Martinsburg Grade Road (County Route 45/9), Little Cacapon Mountain Road (County Route 45/10), and Voits Road (County Route 45/11), to the southwest of Slanesville.

== History ==
The U.S. Post Office Department established a post office at Hainesville on February 11, 1878, with James Haines serving as its first postmaster. The post office was disestablished on April 9, 1895, and Hainesville's mail was then routed to the Barnes Mill post office. Hainesville was alternatively known as Haines Store.

== Bibliography ==
- McMaster, Len (2010). "Hampshire County West Virginia Post Offices, Part 2" (PDF). LaPosta: A Journal of American Postal History. 41 (2). La Posta Publications: 38–48. OCLC 785585746. Archived (PDF) from the original on June 1, 2023.
