= Standard Barrel Act For Fruits, Vegetables, and Dry Commodities =

- Long title: An Act to fix the standard barrel for fruits, vegetables, and other dry commodities.
- Nicknames: Standard Barrel Act, 1915
- Enacted by: the 63rd United States Congress
- Effective: July 1, 1916

Citations
- Public law: Pub. L. 63–307
- Statutes at Large: 38 Stat. 1186

Legislative history
- Introduced in the House as H.R. 4899 by William E. Tuttle Jr. (D–NJ) on December 2, 1914; Committee consideration by House Coinage, Weights, and Measures; Passed the House on January 13, 1915 (201-104); Signed into law by President Woodrow Wilson on March 4, 1915

The Standard Barrel Act For Fruits, Vegetables, and Dry Commodities is United States legislation that specified the standard barrel size and measurements for fruits and vegetables, establishing grading standards and inspections for each produce type. It penalized merchants who didn't use standardized barrels. The act was sponsored by Rep. William E. Tuttle, Jr. (D) of New Jersey.

== Associated Statute of 1915 Act ==
United States Congressional bill relative to United States law in accordance with the Standard Barrel Act For Fruits, Vegetables, and Dry Commodities.

Date of Enactment	Public Law Number	U.S. Statute Citation	U.S. Legislative Bill	U.S. Presidential Administration
August 3, 1912	P.L. 62-252	37 Stat. 250	H.R. 21480	William H. Taft

== See also ==
- Farmers' Bulletin
- Standard Fruits and Vegetable Baskets and Containers Act of 1916
