= Standard Fruits and Vegetable Baskets and Containers Act of 1916 =

- Long title: An Act to fix standards for Climax baskets for grapes and other fruits and vegetables, and to fix standards for baskets and other containers for small fruits, berries, and vegetables, and for other purposes.
- Nicknames: Standard Container Act, 1916
- Enacted by: the 64th United States Congress
- Effective: August 31, 1916

Citations
- Public law: Pub. L. 64–248
- Statutes at Large: 39 Stat. 673

Legislative history
- Introduced in the House as H.R. 17058; Signed into law by President Woodrow Wilson on August 31, 1916

United States Supreme Court cases
- Pacific States Box & Basket Co. v. White

In United States federal agricultural legislation, the Standard Fruits and Vegetable Baskets and Containers Act of 1916 15 U.S.C. § 251-256 dealt with containers for small fruits and vegetables, and prescribed the exact capacity of the containers.

It fixed the cubic contents for dry half-pint, pint, and quart-size containers. It made no reference to the dimensions or form of the container, thus leaving it to the individual states to adopt standards in such respects.

The Act was repealed on October 22, 1968, acknowledging the auspices of the Fair Packaging and Labeling Act.

== Associated Statutes of 1916 Act ==
Chronological bills relative to United States laws in accordance with the Standard Fruits and Vegetable Baskets and Containers Act.

Date of Enactment	Public Law Number	U.S. Statute Citation	U.S. Legislative Bill	U.S. Presidential Administration
May 21, 1928	P.L. 70-462	45 Stat. 685	S. 2148	Calvin Coolidge
June 11, 1934	P.L. 73-306	48 Stat. 930	H.R. 6522	Franklin Roosevelt
June 28, 1954	P.L. 83-434	68 Stat. 301	H.R. 8357	Dwight Eisenhower
August 30, 1964	P.L. 88-516	78 Stat. 697	H.R. 9334	Lyndon Johnson
October 22, 1968	P.L. 90-628	82 Stat. 1320	H.R. 13058	Lyndon Johnson

== See also ==
- Bushel
- Dry measure
- Farmers' Bulletin
- Fruit picking
- Peck
- Standard Barrel Act For Fruits, Vegetables, and Dry Commodities
- Wine Harvest
