= Higginsville, West Virginia =

- Unincorporated community
- Location within West Virginia Location within the United States
- Coordinates: 39°25′5″N 78°34′47″W
- Country: United States
- State: West Virginia
- County: Hampshire
- Time zone: UTC-5 (Eastern (EST))
  - Summer (DST): UTC-4 (EDT)
- GNIS feature ID: 1549740

Higginsville is an unincorporated community in north-central Hampshire County, West Virginia, United States. It is situated at the intersection of Slanesville Pike (County Route 3) and Little Cacapon River Road (County Route 50/9), positioned between Points and Slanesville. Graybill Hollow stream also joins the Little Cacapon River at Higginsville.

== History ==
Historically, Higginsville served as a stagecoach stop on the old Cumberland Road, which connected Winchester, Virginia and Cumberland, Maryland. The U.S. Post Office Department opened a post office there on April 26, 1850, which was discontinued on July 9, 1866, then reestablished on December 27, 1871. The post office remained in operation until June 30, 1948, after which mail services were routed through the Points post office.

== Bibliography ==
- McMaster, Len (2010). "Hampshire County West Virginia Post Offices, Part 2" (PDF). LaPosta: A Journal of American Postal History. 41 (2). La Posta Publications: 38–48. OCLC 785585746. Archived (PDF) from the original on June 1, 2023.
