= Creekvale, West Virginia =

Unincorporated community in West Virginia, United States

- Unincorporated community
- Location within Eastern Panhandle of West Virginia Location within West Virginia Location within the United States
- Coordinates: 39°25′49″N 78°33′4″W
- Country: United States
- State: West Virginia
- County: Hampshire
- Time zone: UTC-5 (Eastern (EST))
  - Summer (DST): UTC-4 (EDT)
- GNIS feature ID: 1554218

Creekvale is an unincorporated community in Hampshire County in the U.S. state of West Virginia. Creekvale is located southeast of Levels along the Little Cacapon River on Little Cacapon-Levels Road (West Virginia Secondary Route 3/3). Creekvale had a post office in operation from 1918 to 1935.
