= Barnes Mill, West Virginia =

Unincorporated community in West Virginia, United States

- Unincorporated community
- Location within Eastern Panhandle of West Virginia Location within West Virginia Location within the United States
- Coordinates: 39°21′4″N 78°38′11″W
- Country: United States
- State: West Virginia
- County: Hampshire
- Time zone: UTC-5 (Eastern (EST))
  - Summer (DST): UTC-4 (EDT)

Barnes Mill is an unincorporated community in Hampshire County in the U.S. state of West Virginia. It is located along the Little Cacapon River on Little Cacapon River Road (West Virginia Secondary Route 50/9) north of Frenchburg. The original "Barnes Mill", from which the community takes its name, was built here on the Little Cacapon in 1813. The community was served by a post office in the 19th century. Barnes Mill was formerly known as Barnes Mills.

== Notable person ==
- Alexander W. Monroe, Speaker of the West Virginia House of Delegates
