= Frenchburg, West Virginia =

Unincorporated community in West Virginia, United States

- Unincorporated community
- Location within West Virginia Location within the United States
- Coordinates: 39°18′55″N 78°39′38″W
- Country: United States
- State: West Virginia
- County: Hampshire
- Elevation: 1,007 ft (307 m)
- Time zone: UTC-5 (Eastern (EST))
  - Summer (DST): UTC-4 (EDT)
- Area code: 304
- GNIS feature ID: 1539262

Frenchburg is an unincorporated community in Hampshire County in the U.S. state of West Virginia. Frenchburg is located along the Northwestern Turnpike (U.S. Route 50) where the Little Cacapon River is formed by the confluence of the North and South forks of the Little Cacapon east of Shanks. Frenchburg is also the location of the southern terminus of Little Cacapon River Road (County Route 50/9) on U.S. Route 50. Frenchburg is primarily known for the events that took place there during the American Civil War.

== History ==
The community most likely was named after the local French family.

=== American Civil War ===
In its earliest days, Frenchburg consisted of a general store and a wagon repair shop. During the American Civil War, Frenchburg was a village consisting of a cluster of houses and a mill, operated by the Cummins family, along the Northwestern Turnpike. The town was burned by Union troops in late 1861. It was believed by the Union troops that Frenchburg's residents were aiding Confederate bushwhackers.

Sergeant John C. Leps, along with seven men, departed the Confederate camp near Blue's Gap and fired upon a detachment of Union soldiers in the vicinity of Frenchburg. The ambush wounded and killed several men. Afterwards, Union General Frederick Lander and other officers sent out word to the residents of Frencburg and the surrounding area that if bushwhacking were to occur again against Union troops in the district, its residents would face punishment. While Frenchburg's residents were most likely not responsible for aiding bushwhackers in the area, General Lander gave orders that the town be burned.

Confederate troops and partisans used a "back road", which presently consists of parts of Little Cacapon River Road (CR 50/9), Three Churches Hollow Road (CR 5/4), and Don McCauley Road (CR 28/1), that ran from Frenchburg to Buffalo Hollow near Hanging Rocks.

After the war, Frenchburg's Camp Walker served as a site for reunions of Confederate veterans and their families until the 1930s.
