= Shanks, West Virginia =

- Unincorporated community
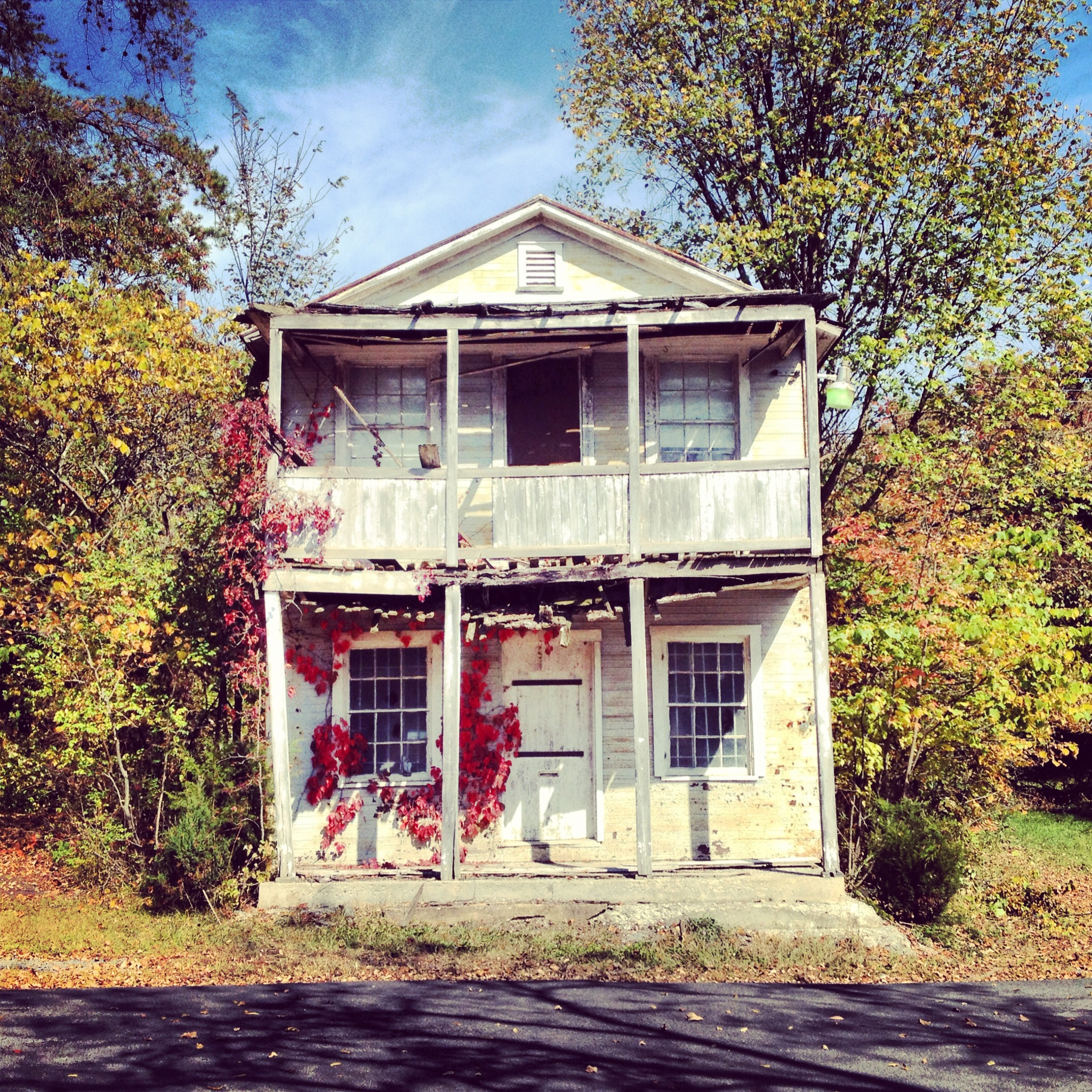
- Old Shanks Store and Post Office

- Location within West Virginia Location within the United States
- Coordinates: 39°18′51″N 78°41′16″W
- Country: United States
- State: West Virginia
- County: Hampshire
- Elevation: 1,125 ft (343 m)
- Time zone: UTC-5 (Eastern (EST))
  - Summer (DST): UTC-4 (EDT)
- ZIP code: 26761
- Area code: 304
- GNIS feature ID: 1555598

Shanks is an unincorporated community in Hampshire County in the U.S. state of West Virginia. According to the 2000 census, the Shanks community has a population of 806.

Shanks is located east of Romney along the Northwestern Turnpike (U.S. Route 50) on the eastern flanks of South Branch Mountain. The community is centered on the intersection of U.S. Route 50 and Allen Hill Road (County Route 50/7). Shanks Roadside Park is located directly to its west on U.S. Route 50. The North Fork Little Cacapon River runs through the community.

Abraham Shank, an early postmaster and local merchant, gave the community his name.

== Historic sites ==
- Elmo Barnes House, Allen Hill Road South (CR 50/7)
- Old Shanks Post Office, US 50 & Allen Hill Road North (CR 50/7)
