= Little Cacapon River =

River in West Virginia, US

Coordinates: 39°31′06″N 78°29′38″W

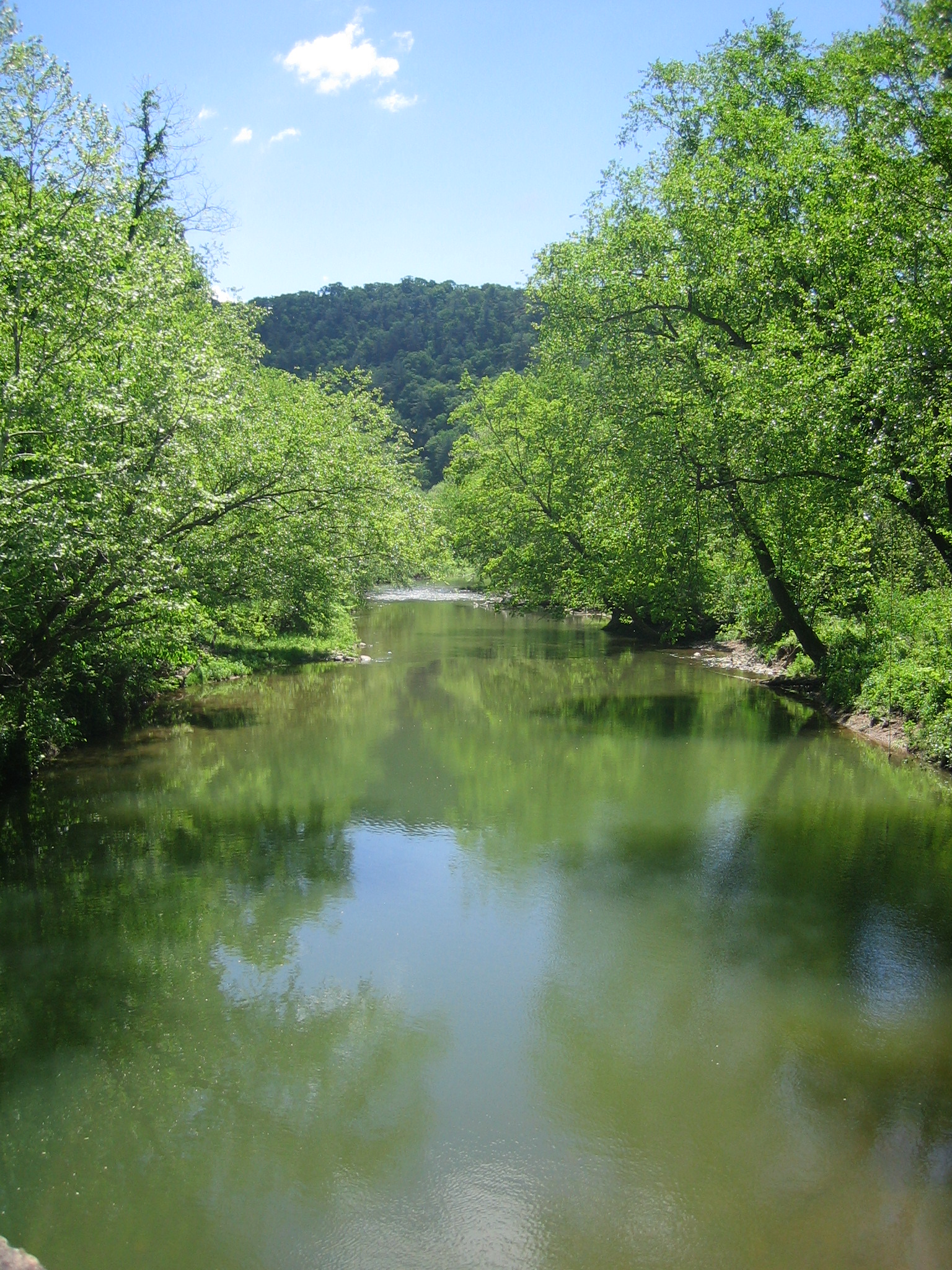
The Little Cacapon viewed north from the Okonoko-Little Cacapon Road (County Route 2/7) bridge

The Little Cacapon River is a 25.1-mile-long (40.4 km) free-flowing tributary of the Potomac River in the center of Hampshire County, West Virginia. Via the Potomac River, its waters are part of the Chesapeake Bay watershed, leading to the Atlantic Ocean. The Little Cacapon enters the Potomac at an elevation of 499 feet (152 m) near the community of Little Cacapon. For the majority of its course the Little Cacapon is a shallow non-navigable stream. It has been historically referred to as both Little Cacapehon and Little Capecaphon. The name is pronounced /kəˈkeɪpən/ kə-KAY-pən or locally /ˈkeɪpən/ KAY-pən.

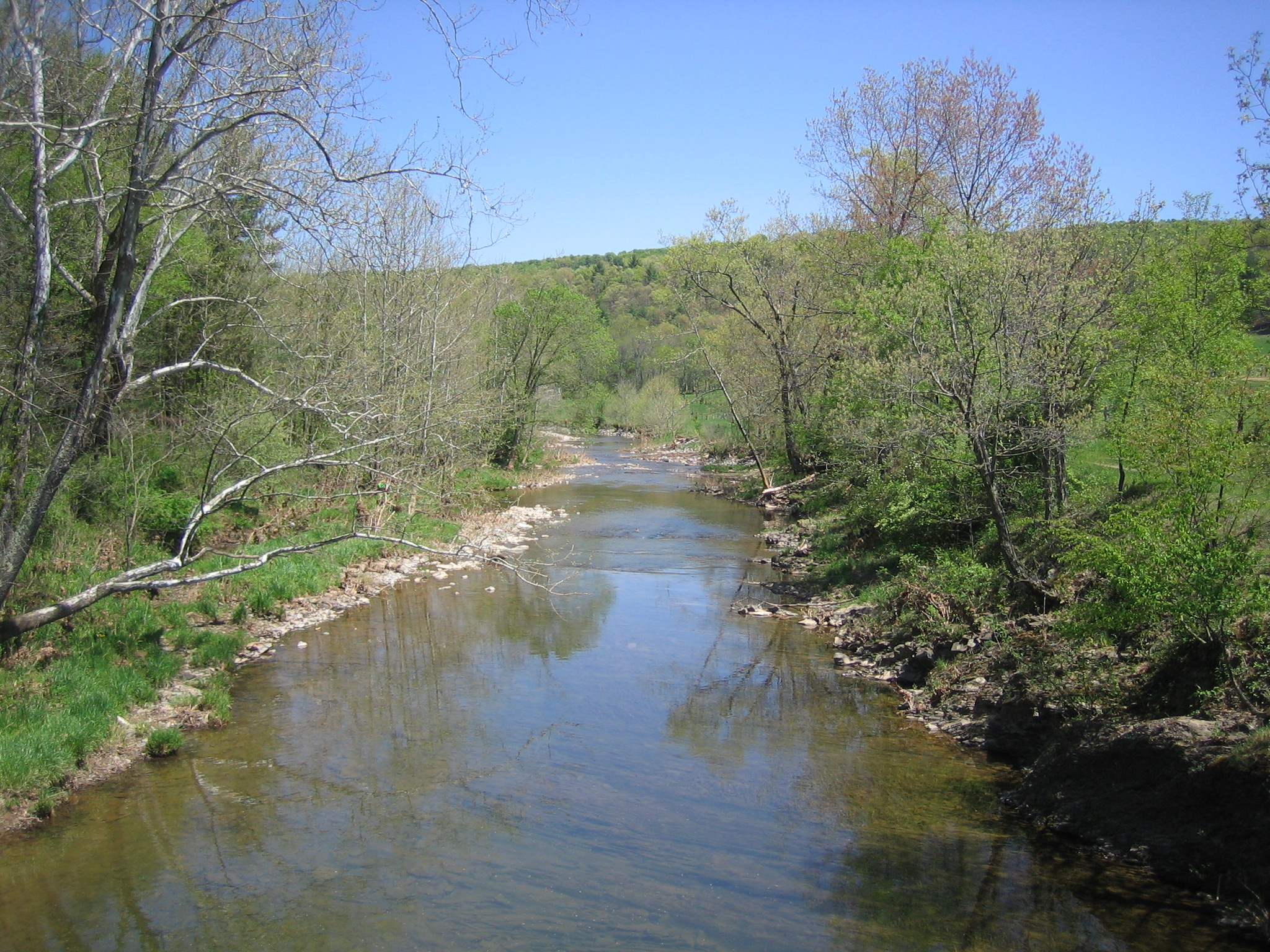
The Little Cacapon viewed from Little Cacapon-Levels Road (CR 3/3) near Creekvale

The Little Cacapon is formed at the confluence of two small streams, the North Fork Little Cacapon and the South Fork Little Cacapon, shortly after they both pass north under the Northwestern Turnpike (U.S. Route 50) at Frenchburg. From Frenchburg, the Little Cacapon flows north between Town Hill, 1,329 feet (405 m) high, to its west and Little Cacapon Mountain, 1,575 feet (480 m) high, to its east. Flowing from a hollow in Town Hill, Shawan Run feeds into the Little Cacapon at Barnes Mill. Two miles (3 km) north, Three Churches Run also feeds into the river from Town Hill. At Higginsville on Slanesville Pike (County Route 3) near the old Vinita School, the river is fed by Crooked Run at Queens Ridge (1,322 feet (403 m) high). From Higginsville, the Little Cacapon continues northeast along Town Hill with 1,161-foot (354 m) Noland Ridge bounding it to the east. Also in the vicinity of Higginsville, Little Cacapon-Levels Road (County Route 3/3) intersects with Slanesville Pike, and as its name suggests, the road follows the Little Cacapon north until it diverges northwest to Levels via Hoffman Hollow. It is within this stretch of the stream that the Little Cacapon meanders by the community of Creekvale. At the entrance of Neals Run, the Little Cacapon is met to its east by 2,237-foot (682 m) Spring Gap Mountain and then flows beneath the Baltimore and Ohio Railroad and empties into the Potomac River.

== Bridges ==
Bridge	Route	Location
Little Cacapon Bridge	Little Cacapon River Road (CR 50/9)	Frenchburg
Barnes Mill Bridge	Little Cacapon River Road (CR 50/9)	Barnes Mill
CR 45/10 Bridge	Little Cacapon Mountain Road (CR 45/10)	Three Churches
Higginsville Bridge	Slanesville Pike (CR 3)	Higginsville
CR 3/3 Bridge	Little Cacapon-Levels Road (CR 3/3)	Creekvale
One-Lane Arch Bridge	Okonoko-Little Cacapon Road (CR 2/7)	Little Cacapon
Little Cacapon Railroad Bridge	Baltimore and Ohio Railroad	Little Cacapon

== North Fork Little Cacapon River ==
The North Fork is a 9.3-mile-long (15.0 km) tributary of the Little Cacapon. The North Fork's source lies in a hollow between 2,618-foot (798 m) Piney Mountain and the southwestern end of 2,274-foot (693 m) Stony Mountain. From its source, the North Fork flows northeast along Grassy Lick Road (County Route 10). South Branch Mountain (3,028 feet (923 m) high) joins the North Fork to its west, and along with Stony Mountain to its east, the river diverges from Grassy Lick Road and continues its northeastern route to Shanks where it meets US Route 50. From Shanks, the North Fork merges with Camp Run and flows east under US Route 50 at Frenchburg, where it merges with the South Fork to create the Little Cacapon River.

== South Fork Little Cacapon River ==
The South Fork is an 8.4-mile-long (13.5 km) tributary of the Little Cacapon. The South Fork is formed at its headwater in a hollow towards the southeastern end of Stony Mountain along South Fork of Little Cacapon Road (County Route 12) between the communities of Kirby and Ruckman. From its source, the South Fork flows northeast toward Bell Hollow, where it meets US Route 50 and turns north through Frye's Flat towards Frenchburg. The South Fork continues north under US Route 50, where it immediately joins with the North Fork to form the Little Cacapon River alongside Little Cacapon River Road (County Route 50/9).

== Tributaries ==
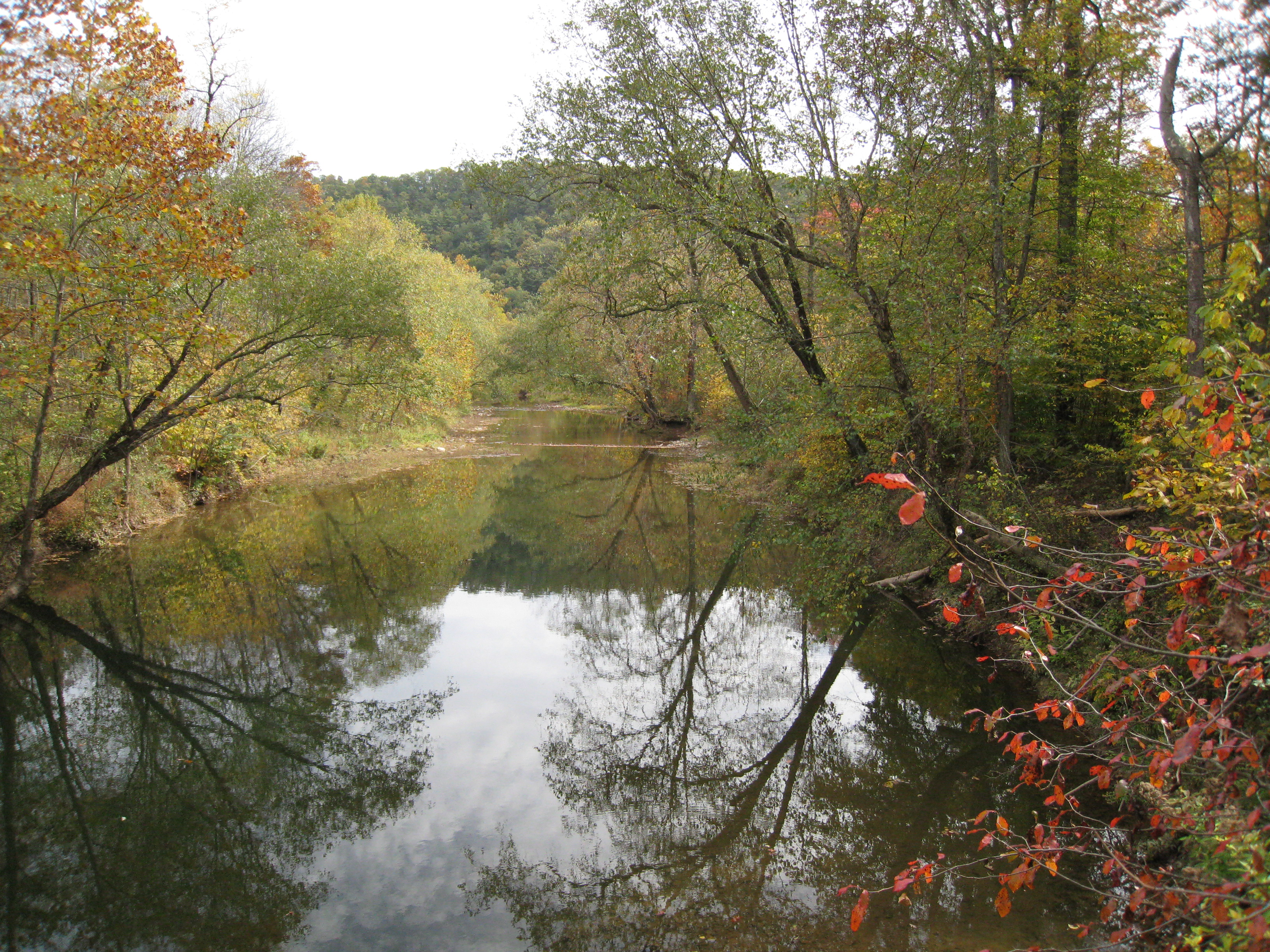
Another view north of the Little Cacapon from the Okonoko-Little Cacapon Road (County Route 2/7) bridge

Tributary streams are listed in order from south to north.

- South Fork Little Cacapon River
  - Bell Hollow Run
- North Fork Little Cacapon River
  - Camp Run
- Shawan Run
- Trinton Hollow Run
- Three Churches Run
- Graybill Hollow Run
- Crooked Run
- Hopkins Lick Run
- Dug Hill Run
- Hoffman Hollow Run
- Chimney Hollow Run
- Neals Run
- Lapley Hollow Run

== List of cities and towns along the Little Cacapon River ==
- Barnes Mill
- Creekvale
- Frenchburg
- Higginsville
- Little Cacapon
- Shanks

== Gallery ==
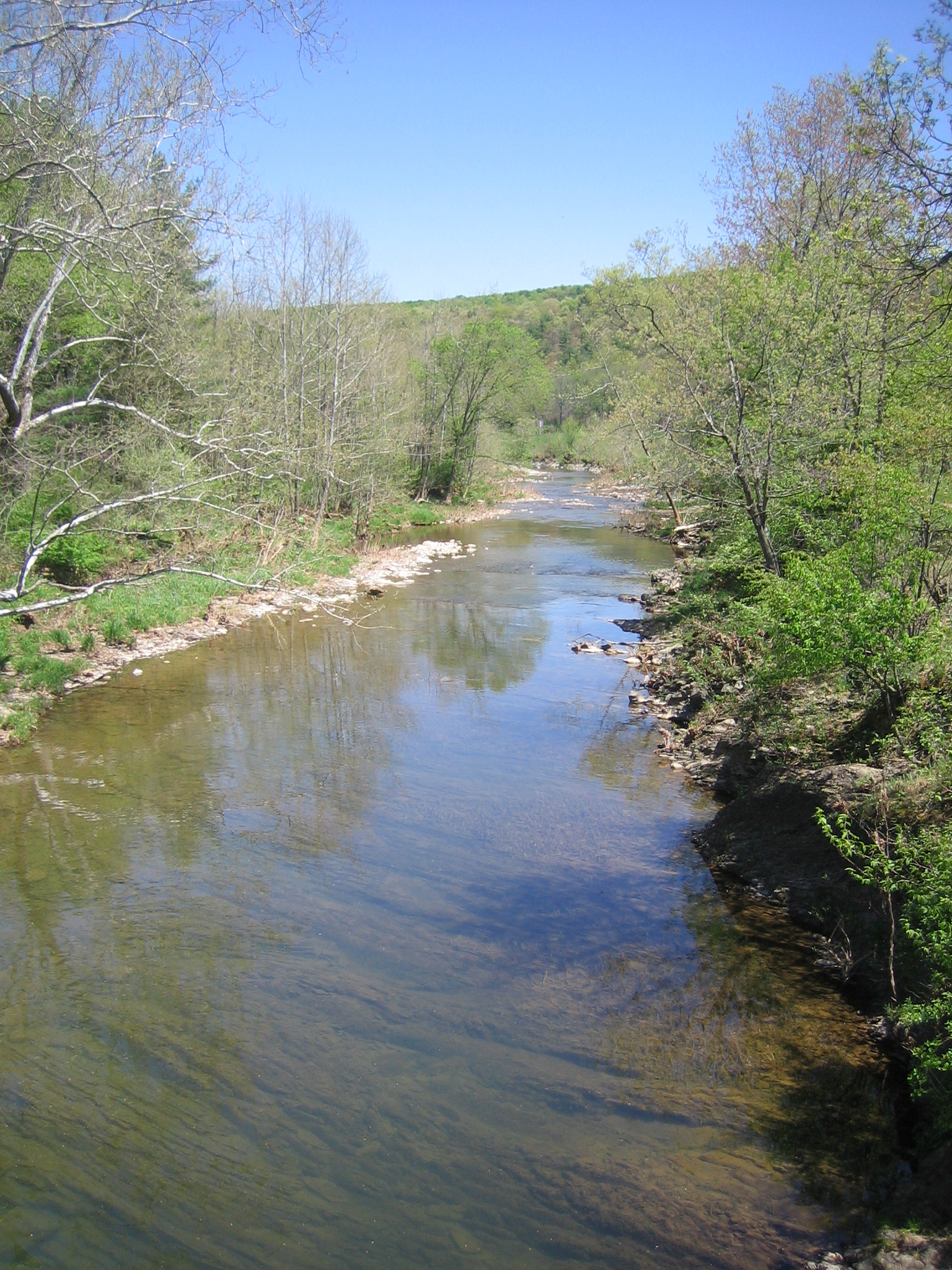
The Little Cacapon River viewed from Little Cacapon-Levels Road (County Route 3/3) near Creekvale

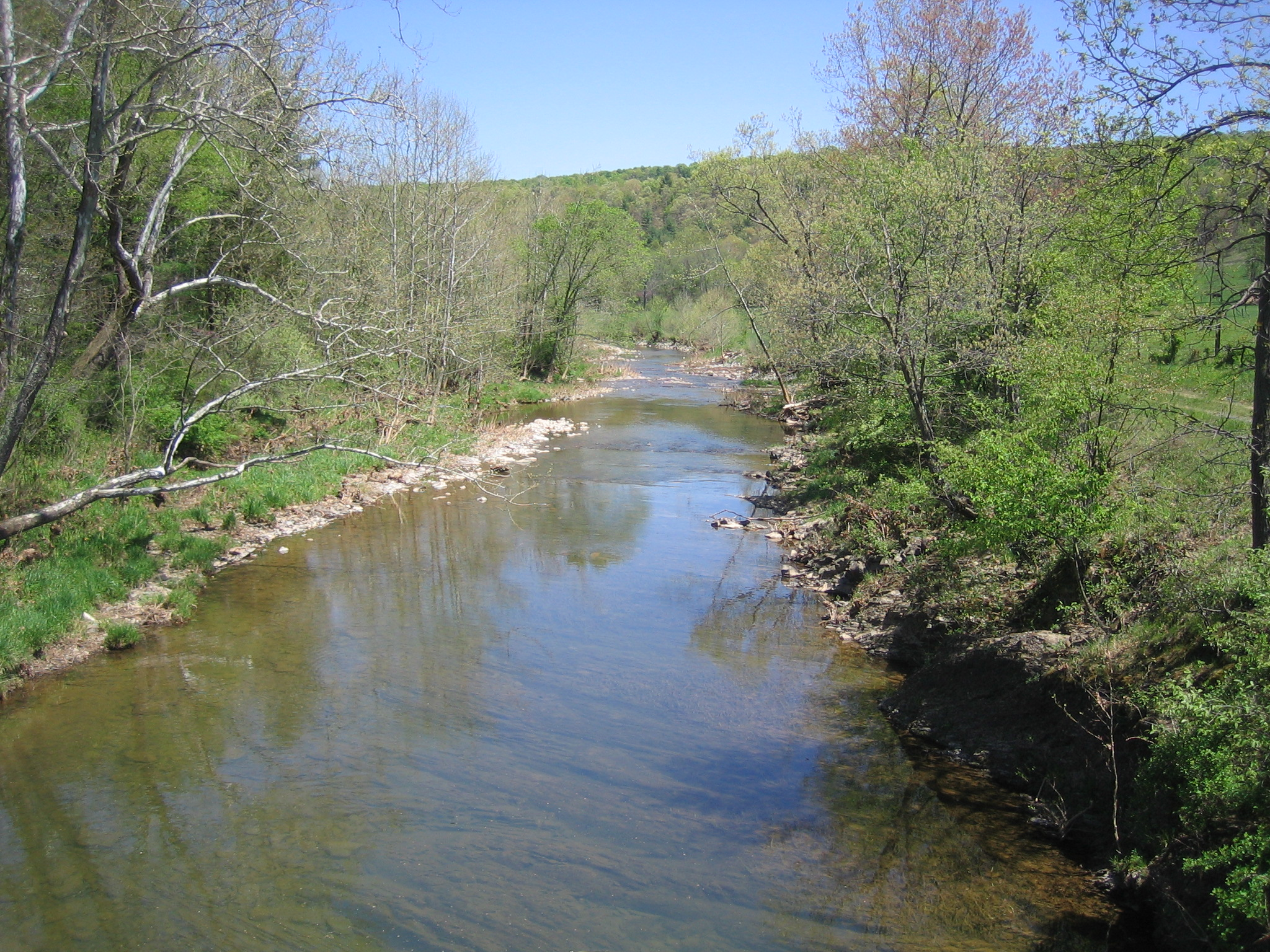
The Little Cacapon River viewed from Little Cacapon-Levels Road (County Route 3/3) near Creekvale

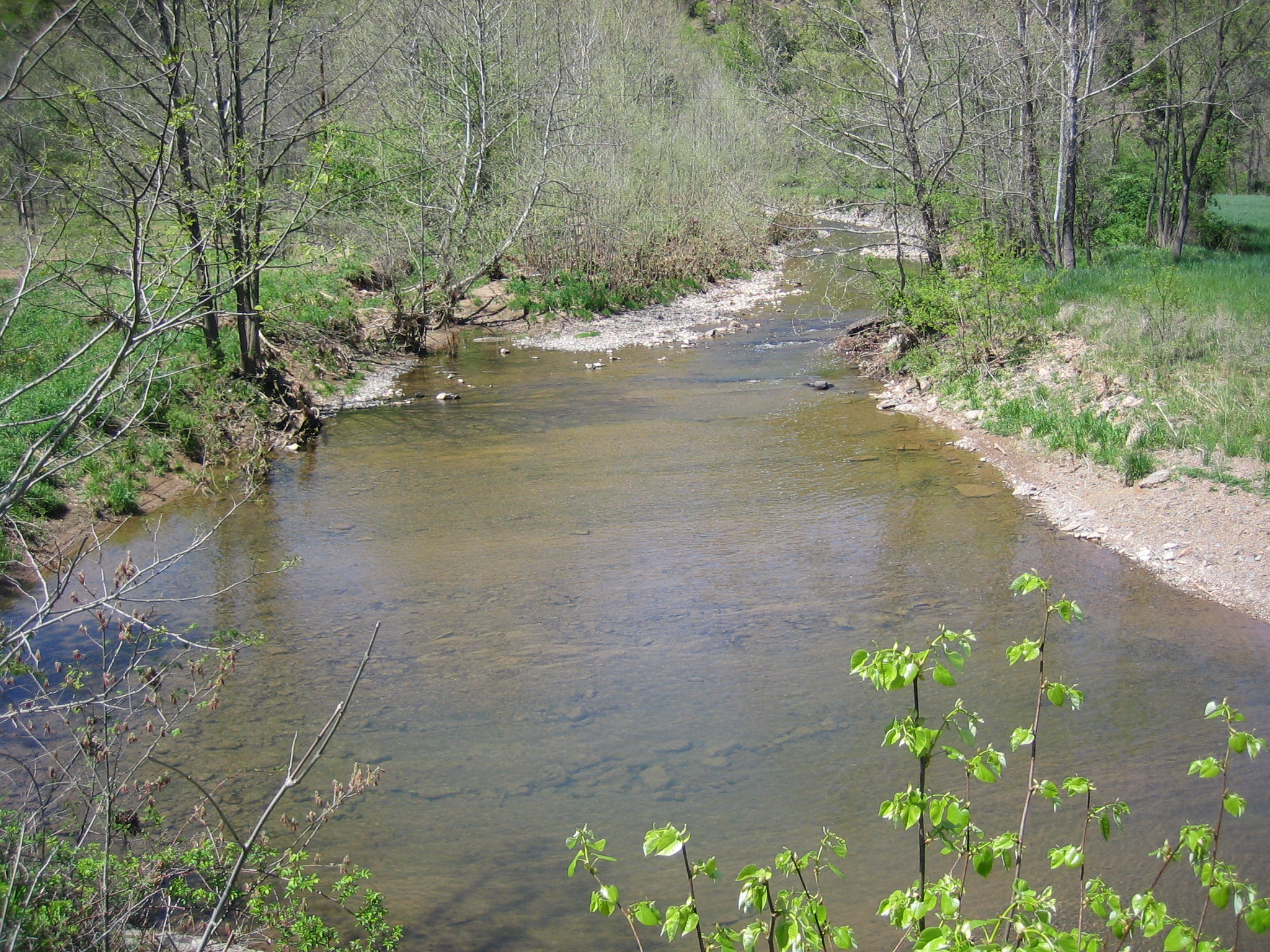
The Little Cacapon River viewed from Little Cacapon-Levels Road (County Route 3/3) near Creekvale

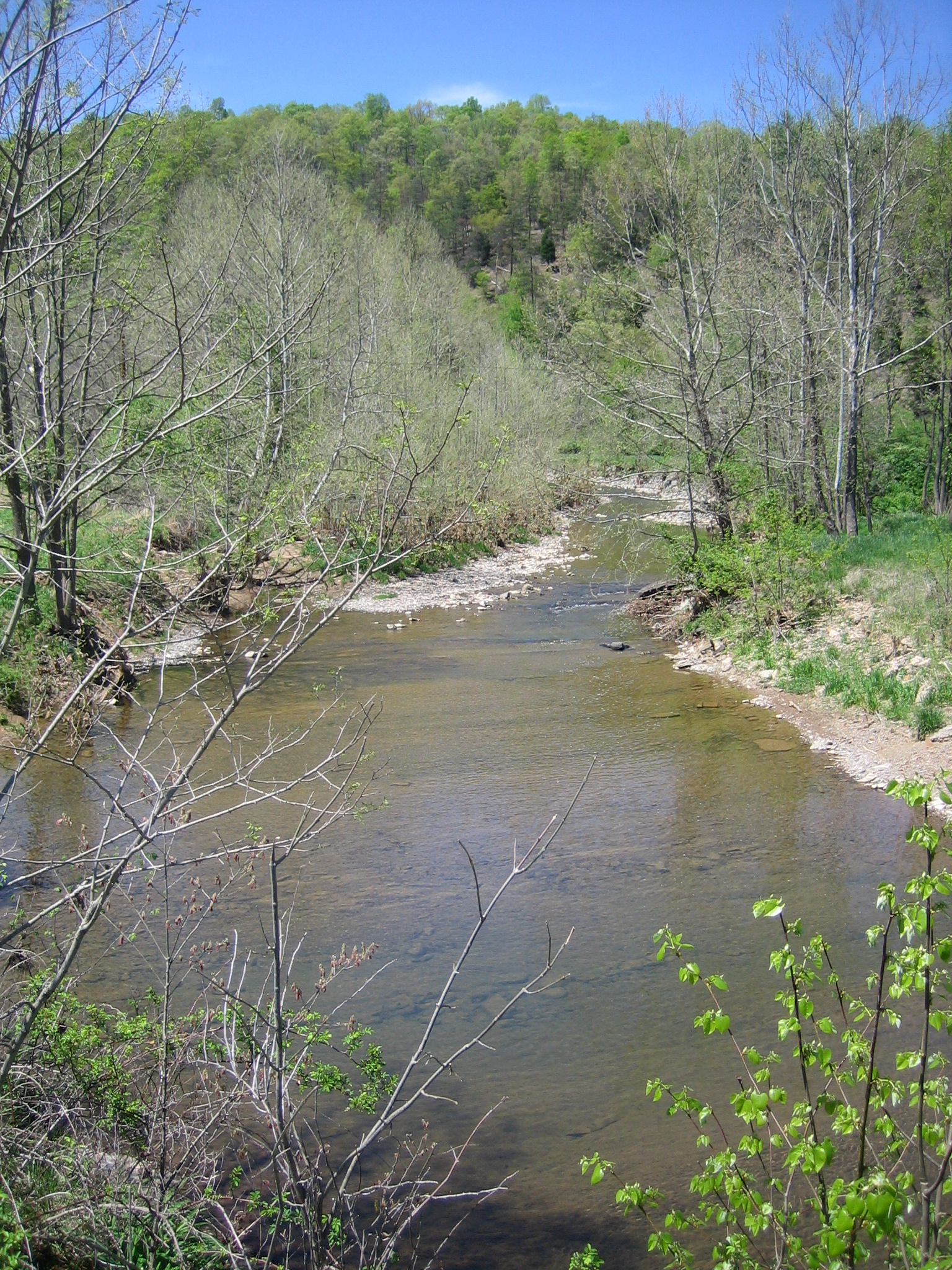
The Little Cacapon River viewed from Little Cacapon-Levels Road (County Route 3/3) near Creekvale

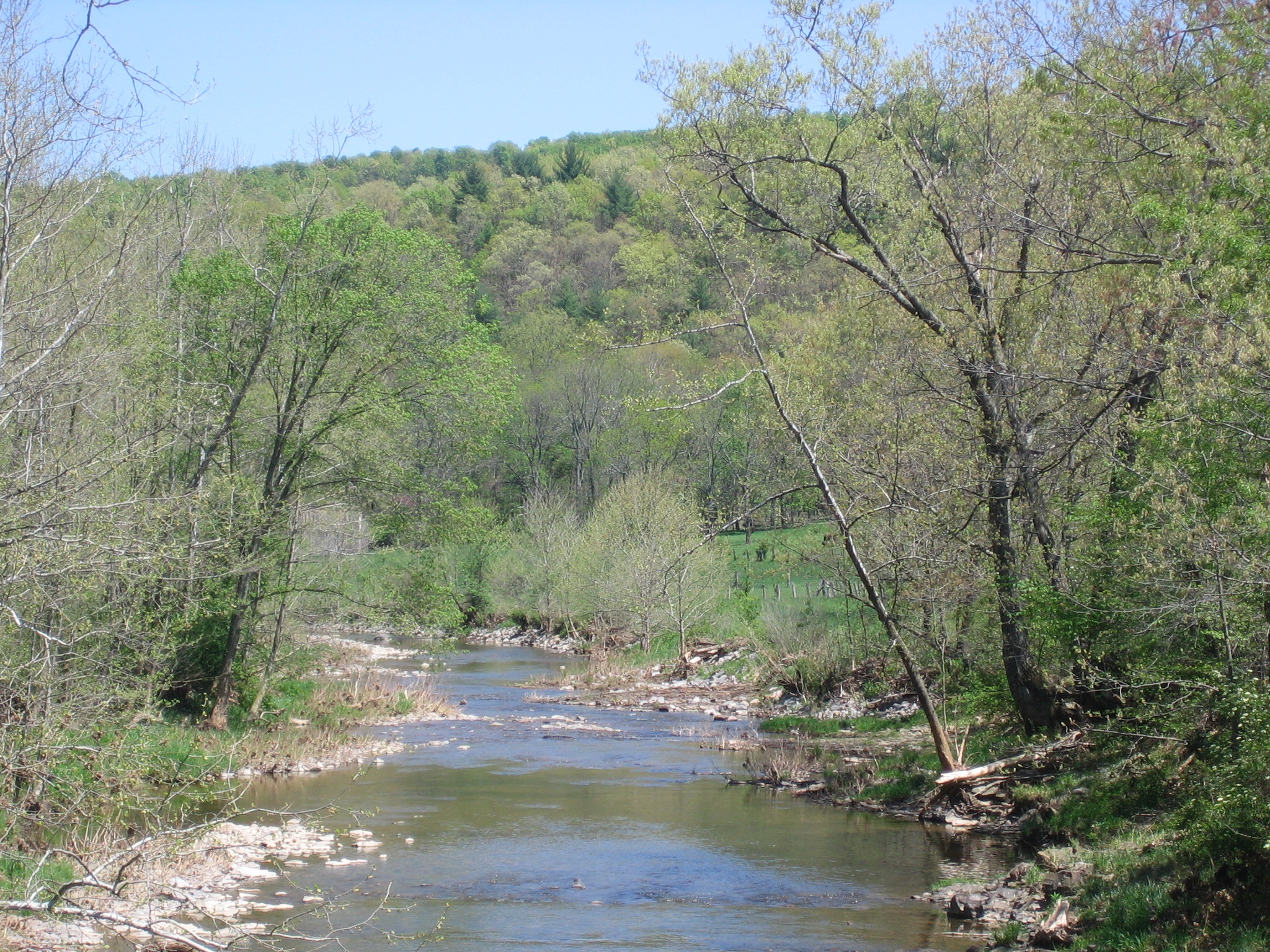
The Little Cacapon River viewed from Little Cacapon-Levels Road (County Route 3/3) near Creekvale

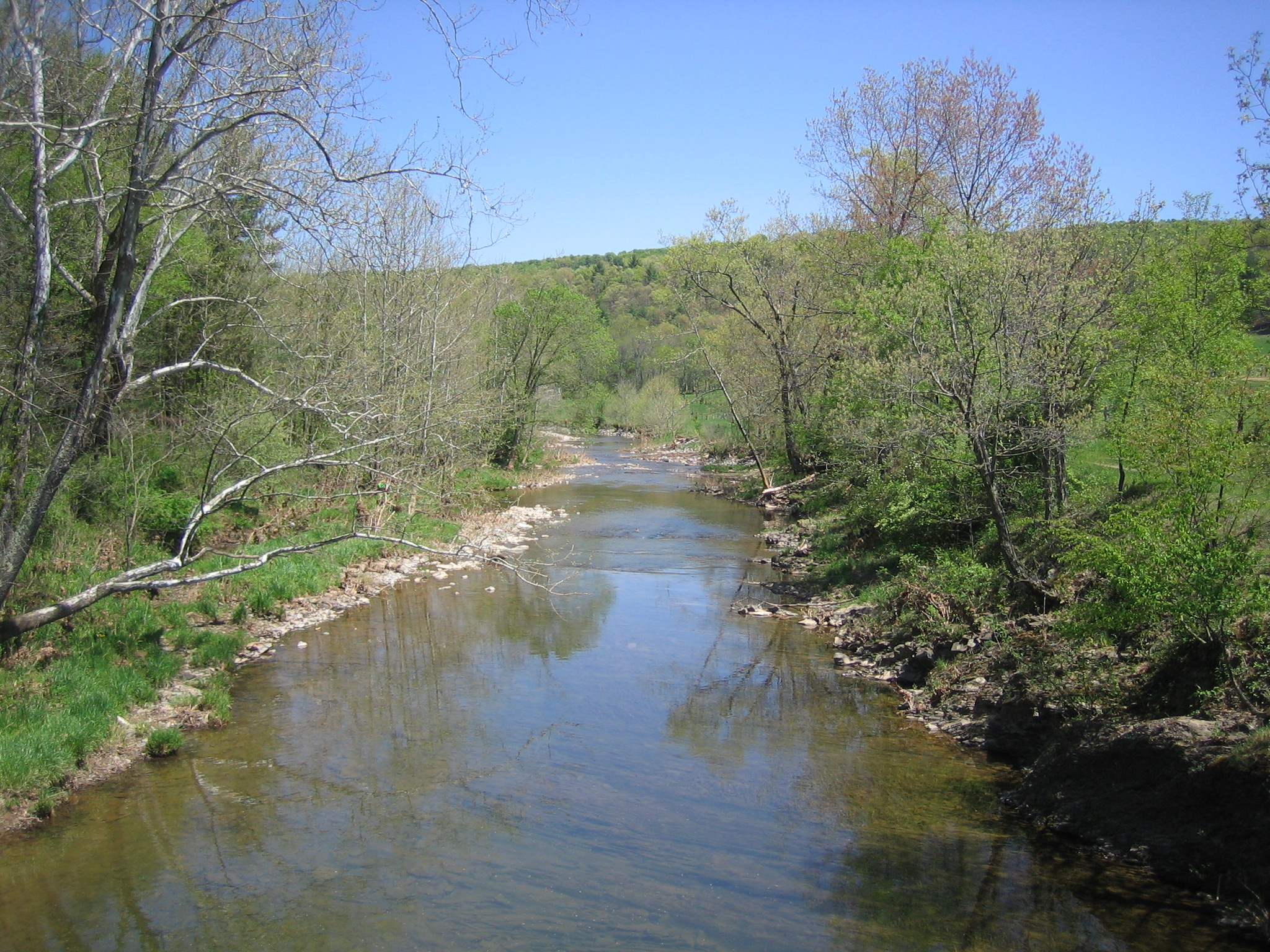
The Little Cacapon River viewed from Little Cacapon-Levels Road (County Route 3/3) near Creekvale

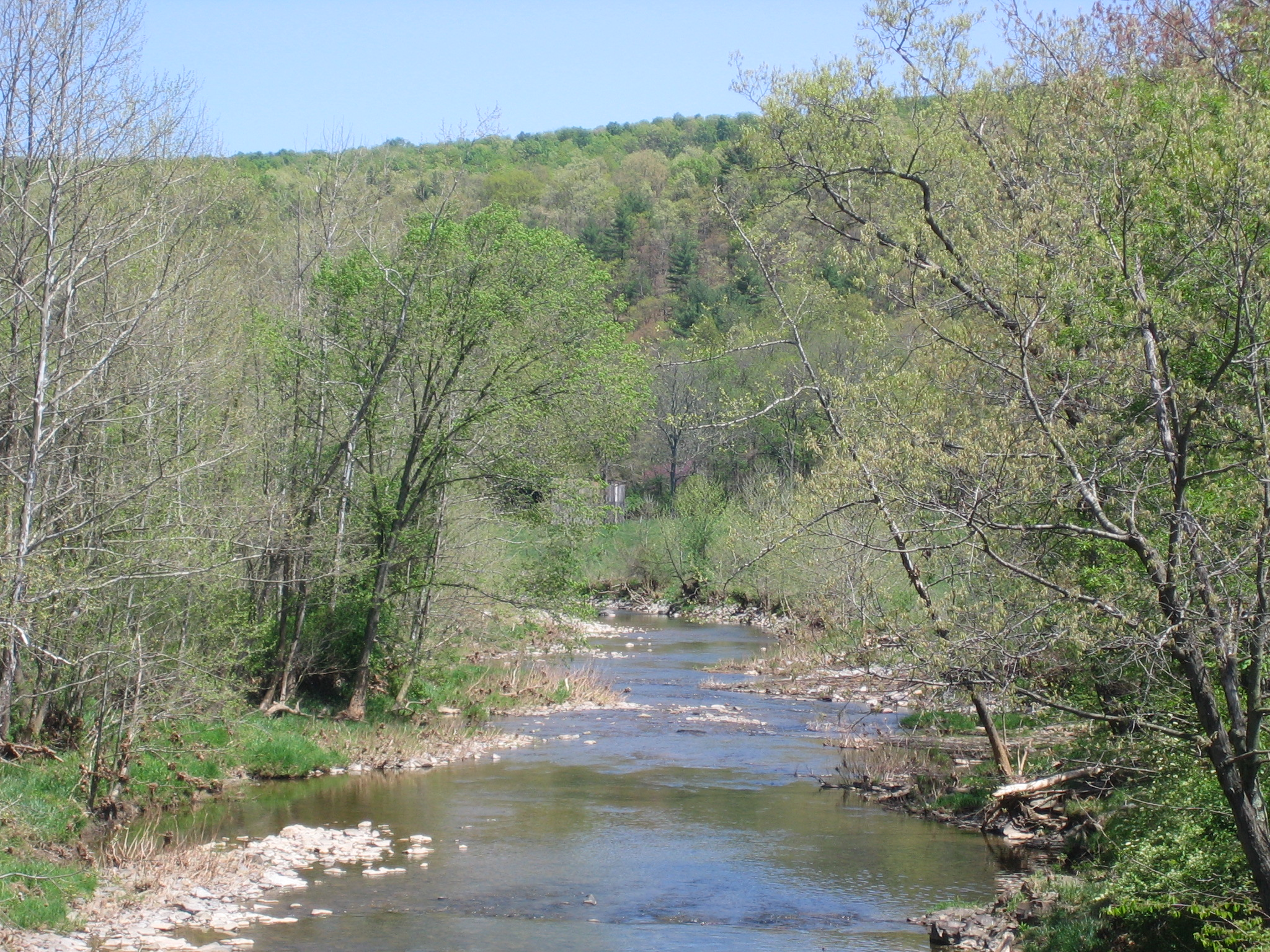
The Little Cacapon River viewed from Little Cacapon-Levels Road (County Route 3/3) near Creekvale

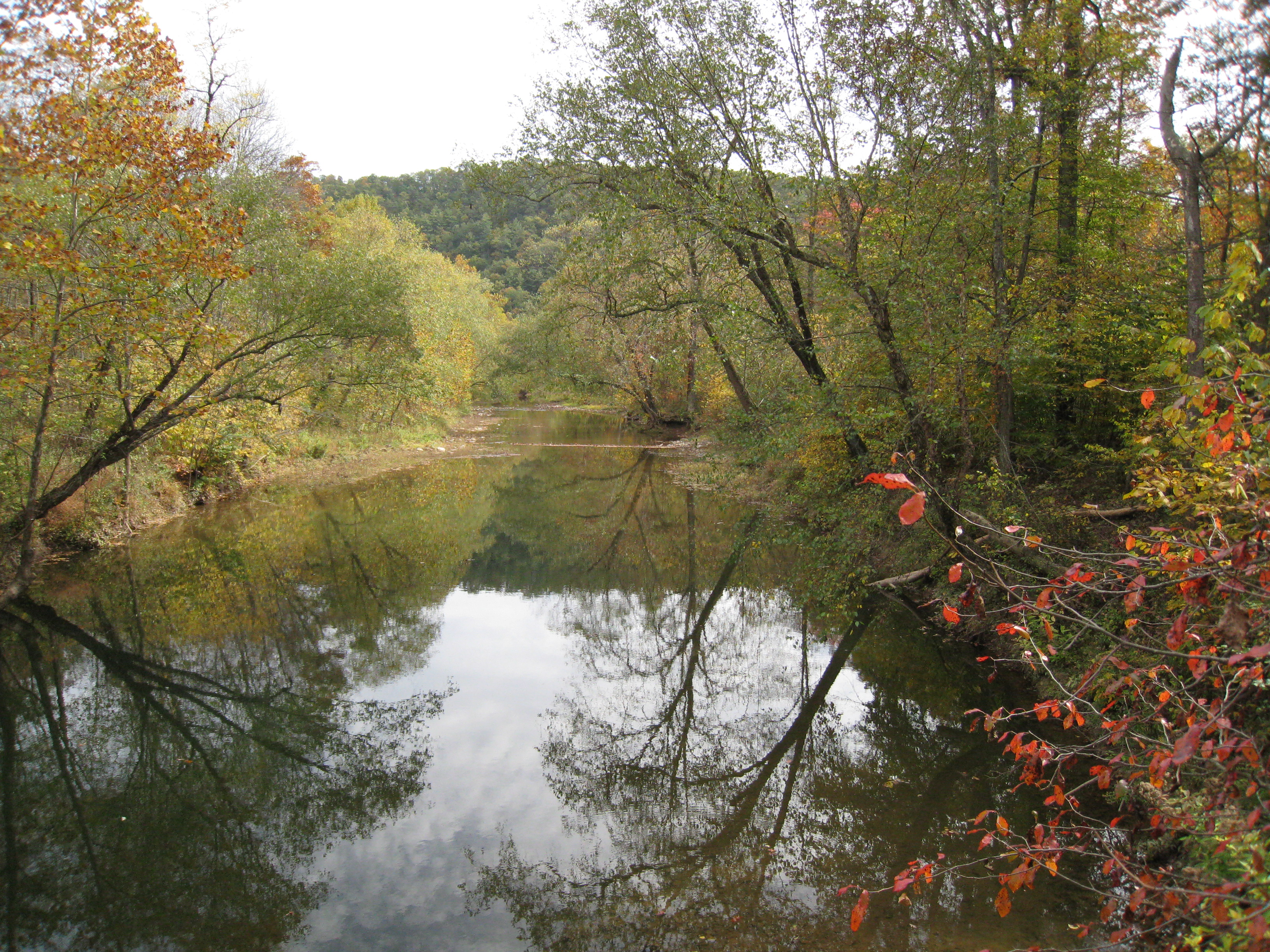
Little Cacapon River viewed from Okonoko-Little Cacapon Road (County Route 2/7) near Little Cacapon

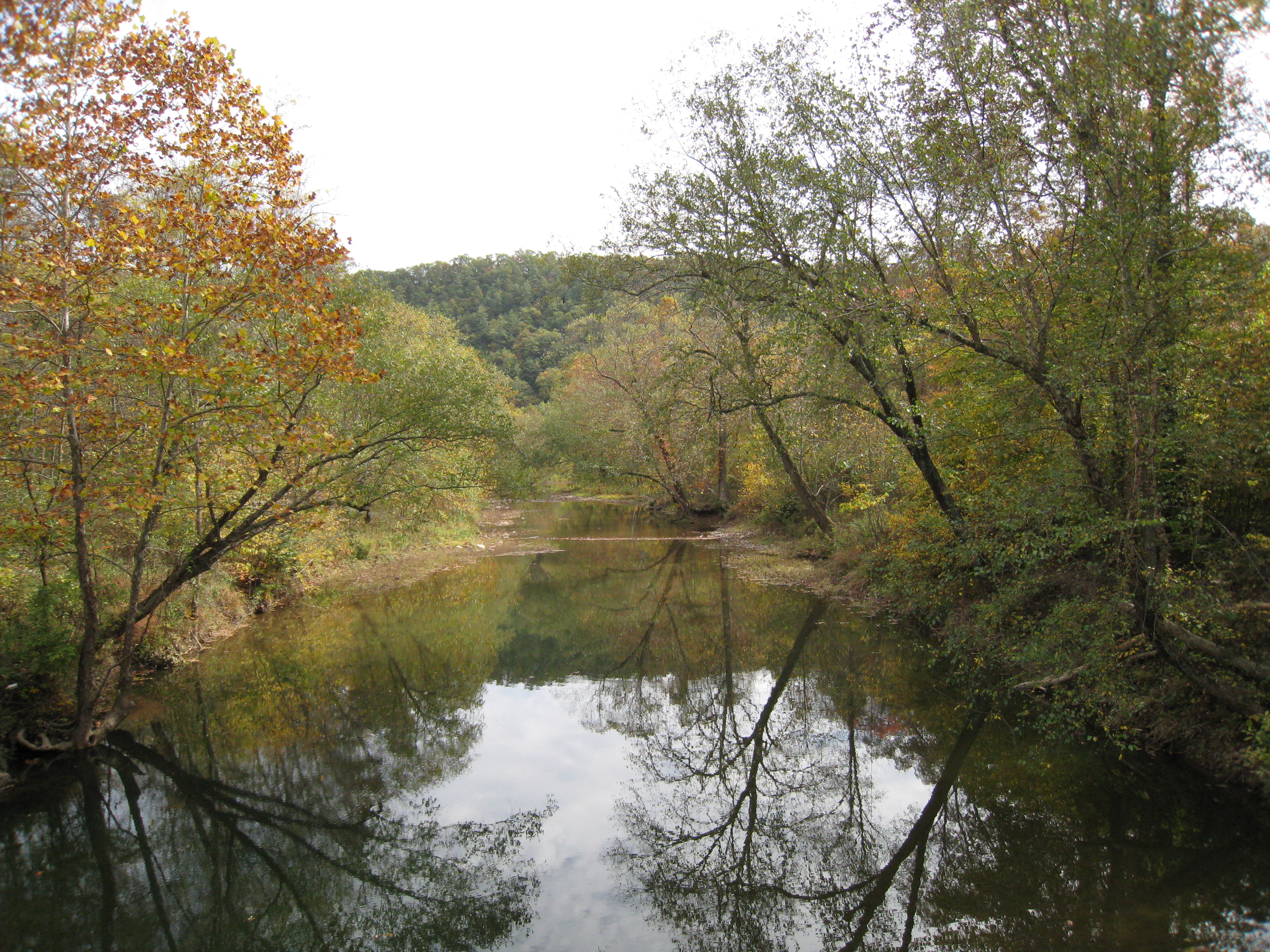
Little Cacapon River viewed from Okonoko-Little Cacapon Road (County Route 2/7) near Little Cacapon

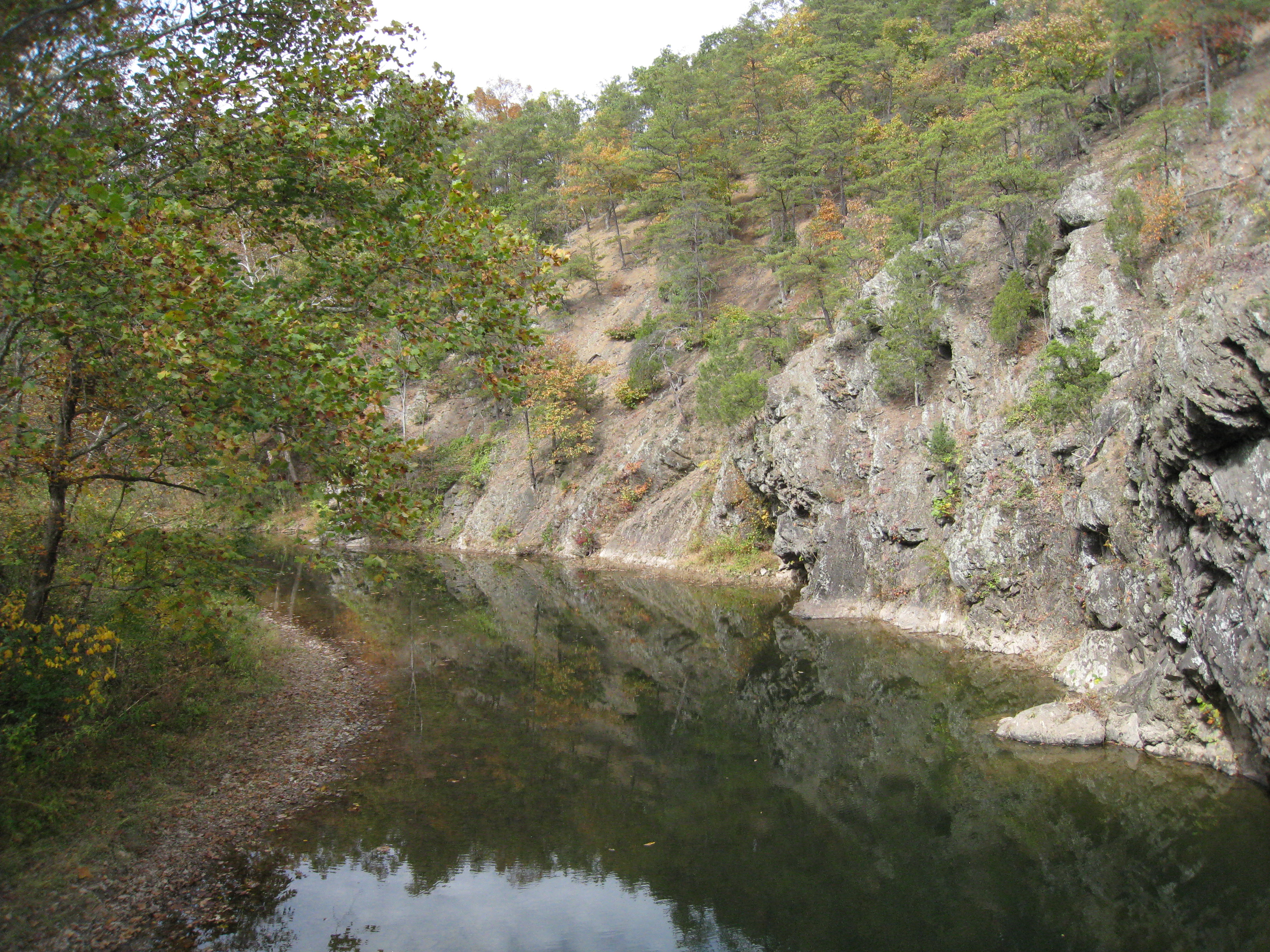
Little Cacapon River viewed from Okonoko-Little Cacapon Road (County Route 2/7) near Little Cacapon

== See also ==
- List of West Virginia rivers
