= Slanesville, West Virginia =

- Unincorporated community
- Location of Slanesville in West Virginia Slanesville, West Virginia (the United States)
- Coordinates: 39°22′23″N 78°31′22″W
- Country: United States
- State: West Virginia
- County: Hampshire
- Elevation: 1,180 ft (360 m)
- Time zone: UTC-5 (Eastern (EST))
  - Summer (DST): UTC-4 (EDT)
- ZIP code: 25444
- Area code: 304
- GNIS feature ID: 1549520

Slanesville is an unincorporated community in northeastern Hampshire County in the U.S. state of West Virginia. Slanesville is located at the crossroads of Bloomery Pike (West Virginia Route 29) with Slanesville Pike (Hampshire County Route 3) and Cold Stream Road (Hampshire County Route 45/20). Slanesville Pike and Cold Stream Road formerly made up the Springfield Grade Road that ran from Capon Bridge to Springfield. According to the 2000 census, the Slanesville community has a population of 691.

== History ==
The community of Slanesville was earliest inhabited by generations of the Slain family in the late 18th century and upon its settlement it was known as Cross Roads because of its prime location at the meeting of the Martinsburg (old West Virginia Route 45) and Springfield (West Virginia Secondary Route 3) Grade Roads. Slanesville then took the name of Slain's Cross Roads after the prominence of the Slain family in the vicinity of the community. It was also misspelled as Slane's Cross Roads which would later influence its current name. Slanesville was then referred to as Dog Town because of the Slain family’s large number of dogs. Finally, the community was referred to as Slainsville and then Slanesville after Thomas Slain in the 1857 when a post office was established here. Slanes Knob (1,588 ft), located near Capon Bridge, is also named for the prominent Slain family in the area.

Slanesville differed from its neighboring communities of Bloomery and North River Mills early on because it never became the center of major industry. Bloomery to its northeast was a center for iron smelting and blooming, while North River Mills, like its name suggests, was a center for mill production on North River. Slanesville was predominantly a farming community throughout most of its history and served as a popular stagecoach stop in the early 19th century along the Martinsburg and Springfield Grade Roads. The only signs of limited industry in Slanesville were two blacksmith shops run by the Hockman family and a cider mill.

Later a store was erected close to the intersection of the Martinsburg and Springfield Grade Roads. The Old Henderson Store was purchased and operated by Glenn and Opal Heavner in the 1940s. When the “New Road”, Route 45 (now Route 29) was cut the Heavners purchased land and built the “New Store”, Heavner’s Grocery. The post office was then moved from its old location on Braddock Road at the old intersection and housed in a corner of the new store. The old store was torn down and the Heavners donated a portion of the land to the Slanesville Presbyterian Church. In the 1960s an addition to the store was added for a new post office. The store was sold in 1973 and has changed hands many times. It is now known as Slanesville General Store .

A fire in the summer of 1955 cost the community three buildings and this led to the formation of the Slanesville Volunteer Fire Department that same year. The owners of Heavner's Grocery donated land adjacent to the store and the men and women of the community built the firehouse and community center. The Slanesville VFD is still located in the same "downtown" location. The Slanesville Presbyterian Church is also located in "downtown" across Slanesville Pike from the general store.

The community’s Slanesville Elementary School along WV 29 south of town was host to President George H. W. Bush in April 1991 when he landed by helicopter in a field adjacent to the school to award Rae Ellen McKee the National Teacher of the Year award for 1991. A fifth grade remedial reading teacher, McKee was chosen from among the nation's more than 2.5 million elementary and secondary public school teachers.

== Churches ==
- Christian
  - Mount Union Christian Church, Bloomery Pike (WV Route 29)
- Mennonite
  - Slanesville Community Mennonite Church, Slanesville Pike (CR 3)
- Presbyterian
  - Slanesville Presbyterian Church, Slanesville Pike (CR 3)

== See also ==
- Camp Waldo Schmitt
