= Farmers' Bulletin =

Farmers’ Bulletin
- Categories: Agriculture
- Frequency: Monthly
- Publisher: U.S. Department of Agriculture
- Founder: U.S. Government
- Founded: 1889
- First issue: June 15, 1889
- Country: United States
- Based in: Washington, D.C.
- Language: English
- Website: www.usda.gov

Farmers' Bulletin was published by the United States Department of Agriculture with the first issue appearing in June 1889. The farm bulletins could be obtained upon the written request to a Member of Congress or to the United States Secretary of Agriculture. The agricultural circular would be sent complimentary to any address within the United States. The agricultural publication covered an extensive range of rural topics as related to agricultural science, agronomy, plant diseases, rural living, soil conservation, and sustainable agriculture.

== Predecessor of Farmers' Bulletin ==
The Department of Agriculture was established upon the passage of H.R. 269 bill as enacted into law by Abraham Lincoln on May 15, 1862. In accordance with section three of the federal statute, the agriculture agency acquired the United States Patent office chemistry bureau. The Division of Chemistry was authorized as a federal supplemental organization of the Department of Agriculture upon the enactment of the United States agricultural H.R. 269 legislation.

The Department of Agriculture Chemistry Division authored an agricultural bulletin first appearing in 1883. The agricultural chemistry publication sustained three decades of print production before being discontinued in 1913.

== See also ==
| Agrarian society | Harvey Washington Wiley |
| Agricultural Experiment Stations Act of 1887 | Henry Leavitt Ellsworth |
| Agricultural Research Service | National FFA Organization |
| American almanacs | Neolithic Revolution |
| Depopulation of the Great Plains | Old Farmer's Almanac |
| Dust Bowl | Rural economics |
| Farmers' Almanac | Rural flight |
| Great Plains Shelterbelt | United States National Agricultural Library |

== Agricultural Bulletin Archives ==
☆ "Farmers' Bulletin Archive". HathiTrust Digital Library. Washington, D.C.: United States Department of Agriculture. 1889.
☆ "Farmers' Bulletin Archive". HathiTrust Digital Library. Washington, D.C.: United States Department of Agriculture. 1889.
☆ "Farmers' Bulletin (United States Department of Agriculture)". Internet Archive. National Agricultural Library: FEDLINK - United States Federal Collection. United States National Agricultural Library.
☆ Miller, Ellen Kay (August 2002). "Index to USDA Farmers' Bulletins". USDA Agricultural Research Service - National Agricultural Library. Washington, D.C.: United States Department of Agriculture. Archived from the original on July 30, 2016.
☆ "Bureau of Chemistry Bulletin ~ 1883-1913". HathiTrust Digital Library. Washington, D.C.: United States Government Printing Office: 165 no.
☆ "U.S. Department of Agriculture Bureau of Chemistry activities, ca. 1883-1912". Prints & Photographs Online Catalog Record. United States Library of Congress. 1883.

== Reading Bibliography ==
- True, Alfred Charles (November 1912). "The United States Department of Agriculture, 1862-1912". Internet Archive. Association of American Agricultural Colleges and Experiment Stations. OCLC 16316910.
- True, Alfred Charles (1929). "A History of Agricultural Education in the United States 1785-1925". Internet Archive. Washington, D.C.: United States Department of Agriculture. OCLC 6072321.
- True, Alfred Charles (1929). "A History of Agricultural Experimentation and Research in the United States, 1620-1925". Internet Archive. Washington, D.C.: United States Department of Agriculture. OCLC 71027382.
- True, Alfred Charles (1937). A History of Agricultural Experimentation and Research in the United States, 1607-1925 : including a History of the United States Department of Agriculture. Washington, D.C.: United States Department of Agriculture. ISBN 978-1334782831. OCLC 983340378 – via Internet Archive.
- Mintz, S.; McNeil, S. (2018). "Abraham Lincoln and Agriculture". Digital History. Digital History Partners.
