= Springfield Grade Road =

Pre-freeway turnpike in West Virginia

The Springfield Grade Road was an early turnpike between Springfield, West Virginia and Capon Bridge, West Virginia.

Springfield Grade Road was originally known as the Great Wagon Road or Great Wagon Turnpike that connected Winchester, Virginia to Cumberland, Maryland in the late 18th and early 19th centuries. Later, in the 18th century, the wagon road became known as the Springfield Grade and when county routes were established in West Virginia in the 1920s, the road was signed as Springfield Grade Road. From Springfield to Slanesville on West Virginia Route 29 (then West Virginia Route 45), Springfield Grade was County Route 3. From Slanesville to the village of North River Mills, the grade was County Route 45/20. And finally, from North River Mills to Capon Bridge, the grade was County Route 15.

In 2003, the Hampshire County 911 Center was given the responsibility of completing a database of Hampshire County roadnames to ensure that there were no duplicate names that would interfere with emergency services and the county's new addressing system. It was decided that because Springfield Grade Road was made up of several Secondary Routes, it would be divided and renamed. On the section of Secondary Route 3 between Springfield and Points, the grade was renamed Springfield Pike. The remainder of County Route 3 between Points and Slanesville was renamed Slanesville Pike. County Routes 45/20 and 15 were renamed Cold Stream Road between Slanesville and Capon Bridge.

Today, while the newly assigned addresses to the residents living on the old Springfield Grade Road reflect the road's newly minted names, the people of Hampshire County continue to refer to it as Springfield Grade.
