= National Register of Historic Places listings in Berkeley County, West Virginia =

Location of Berkeley County in West Virginia

Berkeley County, West Virginia, has 121 properties and districts listed on the National Register of Historic Places, including one National Historic Landmark.

The locations of National Register properties and districts for which the latitude and longitude coordinates are included below, may be seen in an online map.

This National Park Service list is complete through NPS recent listings posted September 4, 2026.

Contents: Counties in West Virginia

Barbour - Berkeley - Boone - Braxton - Brooke - Cabell - Calhoun - Clay - Doddridge - Fayette - Gilmer - Grant - Greenbrier - Hampshire - Hancock - Hardy - Harrison - Jackson - Jefferson - Kanawha - Lewis - Lincoln - Logan - Marion - Marshall - Mason - McDowell - Mercer - Mineral - Mingo - Monongalia - Monroe - Morgan - Nicholas - Ohio - Pendleton - Pleasants - Pocahontas - Preston - Putnam - Raleigh - Randolph - Ritchie - Roane - Summers - Taylor - Tucker - Tyler - Upshur - Wayne - Webster - Wetzel - Wirt - Wood - Wyoming

== Current listings ==
	Name on the Register	Image	Date listed	Location	City or town	Description
1	Abell-Kilbourn House	Abell-Kilbourn House	November 21, 1994 (#94001290)	1018 Winchester Ave. 39°26′48″N 77°58′47″W	Martinsburg	
2	Apollo Theatre	Apollo Theatre	October 11, 1979 (#79002569)	128 E. Martin St; 39°27′29″N 77°57′45″W	Martinsburg	
3	Ar-Qua Springs	Ar-Qua Springs	December 12, 1976 (#76001929)	County Route 37; 39°25′27″N 78°02′18″W	Arden	
4	Aspen Hall	Aspen Hall	December 10, 1980 (#80004882)	405 Boyd Ave. 39°27′47″N 77°57′54″W	Martinsburg	
5	Baldwin-Grantham House	Baldwin-Grantham House	November 21, 1994 (#94001296)	County Route 18 east of Shanghai; 39°26′14″N 78°07′08″W	Shanghai	
6	Baltimore and Ohio and Related Industries Historic District	Baltimore and Ohio and Related Industries Historic District	December 10, 1980 (#80004415)	Roughly bounded by the Baltimore & Ohio railroad line from the southern side of the Burke St. underpass to the northern side of the B&O and Pennsylvania Railroad bridge 39°27′43″N 77°57′45″W	Martinsburg	
7	Baltimore and Ohio Railroad Martinsburg Shops	Baltimore and Ohio Railroad Martinsburg Shops	July 31, 2003 (#03001045)	300 E. Martin St. 39°27′39″N 77°57′34″W	Martinsburg	
8	William Boggs Farm		March 7, 2001 (#00001310)	WV 7; 39°32′25″N 78°01′32″W	Hedgesville	
9	Boomtown Historic District	Boomtown Historic District	December 10, 1980 (#80004414)	Roughly along Winchester Ave. to Arden Rd., W. King St. to Red Hill Rd., W. Stephen, W. Addition St., and Raleigh Sts. 39°27′06″N 77°58′44″W	Martinsburg	
10	Boyd Avenue Historic District	Boyd Avenue Historic District	August 3, 2007 (#07000781)	Eastern and western sides of Boyd Ave., north of Queen St. 39°27′50″N 77°57′53″W	Martinsburg	
11	Boydville	Boydville	October 15, 1970 (#70000649)	601 S. Queen St. 39°27′05″N 77°58′05″W	Martinsburg	
12	Boydville Historic District	Boydville Historic District	December 10, 1980 (#80004413)	Roughly bounded by W. Stephen, S. Spring, and S. Queen Sts., including the grounds of Boydville; 39°27′06″N 77°58′01″W	Martinsburg	
13	Thomas Brown House	Thomas Brown House	January 16, 1986 (#86000202)	County Route 30; 39°23′40″N 78°02′55″W	Inwood	
14	Bunker Hill Historic District	Bunker Hill Historic District	December 10, 1980 (#80004412)	Junction of U.S. Route 11 and WV 26; 39°19′56″N 78°03′13″W	Bunker Hill	
15	James Nathanial Burwell House	James Nathanial Burwell House	May 16, 1991 (#91000553)	East of U.S. Route 11, north of West Virginia state line 39°17′36″N 78°04′27″W	Ridgeway	
16	Campbellton	Campbellton	December 10, 1980 (#80004411)	Address Unknown; 39°24′20″N 78°04′16″W	Gerrardstown	
17	Citizens National Bank	Citizens National Bank	August 29, 2023 (#100009139)	110 West King St. 39°27′23″N 77°57′52″W	Martinsburg	
18	Clary's Mountain Historic District	Clary's Mountain Historic District	April 15, 2004 (#04000314)	Hammond's Mill Rd. 39°33′25″N 77°59′22″W	Hedgesville	
19	Edward Colston House	Edward Colston House	May 1, 2003 (#03000347)	1598 Tice Rd. 39°35′26″N 77°55′15″W	Falling Waters	
20	Continental Clay Brick Plant	Continental Clay Brick Plant	December 10, 1980 (#80004439)	Southeast of Martinsburg on WV 9; 39°25′59″N 77°57′31″W	Martinsburg	
21	Cool Spring Farm	Cool Spring Farm	November 21, 1994 (#94001292)	Runnymede Rd. (WV 26) south of Gerrardstown; 39°19′53″N 78°06′23″W	Gerrardstown	
22	Samuel Cunningham House	Samuel Cunningham House	December 12, 1976 (#76001930)	Southeast of Hedgesville off WV 9; 39°31′45″N 77°58′46″W	Hedgesville	
23	Darkesville Historic District	Darkesville Historic District	December 10, 1980 (#80004410)	U.S. Route 11 at Middle Creek; 39°22′27″N 78°01′25″W	Darkesville	
24	Charles Downs II House	Charles Downs II House	May 17, 1991 (#91000554)	County Route 1, west of U.S. Route 11; 39°34′19″N 77°53′36″W	Marlowe	
25	Downtown Martinsburg Historic District	Downtown Martinsburg Historic District	December 10, 1980 (#80004416)	Roughly bounded by W. Race, Water, Stephen, and Charles Sts. 39°27′28″N 77°57′59″W	Martinsburg	
26	John Drinker House	John Drinker House	December 10, 1980 (#80004409)	Sam Mason Rd. 39°19′06″N 78°04′48″W	Bunker Hill	
27	East Martinsburg Historic District	East Martinsburg Historic District	December 10, 1980 (#80004417)	Roughly bounded by the Baltimore & Ohio railroad right-of-way, N. Queen St., Moler Ave., and High St. 39°27′40″N 77°57′19″W	Martinsburg	
28	Edgewood	Edgewood	December 10, 1980 (#80004431)	Address Unknown; 39°19′49″N 78°03′29″W	Bunker Hill	
29	John Evans House	John Evans House	March 22, 2006 (#06000168)	2298 Winchester Ave. 39°25′44″N 77°59′17″W	Martinsburg	
30	Faraway Farm		December 10, 1980 (#80004432)	WV 8; 39°32′55″N 77°56′23″W	Martinsburg	
31	Federal Aviation Administration Records Center	Federal Aviation Administration Records Center	September 10, 1974 (#74001995)	300 W. King St. 39°27′55″N 77°58′00″W	Martinsburg	
32	Forest Hill School	Forest Hill School	April 21, 2025 (#100011742)	12556 Apple Harvest Drive; 39°25′51″N 78°01′11″W	Martinsburg	
33	Teter Myers French House	Teter Myers French House	December 10, 1980 (#80004434)	Junction of Routes 1 and 3; 39°33′57″N 77°58′00″W	Hedgesville	
34	Gerrardstown Historic District	Gerrardstown Historic District	August 5, 1991 (#91001008)	Roughly along WV 51 and Virginia Line Rd. 39°22′07″N 78°05′51″W	Gerrardstown	
35	Washington Gold House	Washington Gold House	January 12, 1984 (#84003470)	South of Gerrardstown on County Route 51/2; 39°21′12″N 78°06′35″W	Gerrardstown	
36	Green Hill Cemetery Historic District	Green Hill Cemetery Historic District	December 10, 1980 (#80004433)	486 E. Burke St. 39°27′13″N 77°57′20″W	Martinsburg	
37	Harlan Spring Historic District	Harlan Spring Historic District	December 10, 1980 (#80004435)	Harlan Spring; 39°32′59″N 77°57′21″W	Hedgesville	
38	Harmony Cemetery	Harmony Cemetery	December 10, 1980 (#80004436)	Route 1/1; 39°35′13″N 77°52′54″W	Marlowe	
39	Hays-Pitzer House	Hays-Pitzer House	November 21, 1994 (#94001294)	Middle Creek Rd. (WV 45) north of Inwood; 39°25′00″N 78°03′53″W	Martinsburg	
40	Hays-Gerrard House	Hays-Gerrard House	September 16, 1985 (#85002409)	Congress St. 39°22′10″N 78°05′50″W	Gerrardstown	
41	Hedges Chapel	Hedges Chapel	December 12, 2002 (#02001520)	668 Mountain Lake Rd. 39°33′27″N 78°05′31″W	Hedgesville	
42	Decatur Hedges House	Decatur Hedges House	January 12, 1984 (#84003473)	WV 9; 39°30′48″N 77°58′20″W	Hedgesville	
43	Owen Tudor Hedges House	Owen Tudor Hedges House	November 21, 1994 (#94001293)	County Route 8 east of Hedgesville; 39°32′22″N 77°56′44″W	Hedgesville	
44	Samuel Hedges House		December 12, 1976 (#76001931)	County Route 9/10; 39°31′40″N 77°59′52″W	Hedgesville	
45	Hedges-Lemen House	Hedges-Lemen House	May 2, 1991 (#91000556)	County Route 4, 0.7 miles north of its junction with WV 9; 39°32′31″N 77°58′47″W	Hedgesville	
46	Hedges-Robinson-Myers House	Hedges-Robinson-Myers House	December 10, 1980 (#80004418)	Route 3; 39°33′27″N 77°58′27″W	Hedgesville	
47	Hedgesville Historic District	Hedgesville Historic District	December 10, 1980 (#80004419)	Roughly bounded by N. and S. Mary St., and E. and W. Main St. 39°33′12″N 77°59′39″W	Hedgesville	
48	George Washington Hollida House	George Washington Hollida House	February 11, 2004 (#04000031)	4781 Scabble Rd. 39°29′03″N 77°50′02″W	Shepherdstown	
49	Hughes-Cunningham House	Hughes-Cunningham House	July 8, 1985 (#85001518)	Harlan Springs Rd. 39°32′10″N 77°57′38″W	Hedgesville	Destroyed in a 2017 fire.
50	Jones Mill Run Historic District	Jones Mill Run Historic District	December 10, 1980 (#80004421)	Address Unknown; 39°29′15″N 77°49′44″W	Martinsburg	
51	Kearfott-Bane House	Kearfott-Bane House	July 8, 1985 (#85001520)	WV 36/1; 39°26′02″N 77°55′09″W	Baker Heights	
52	Elizabeth Kunkel House	Elizabeth Kunkel House	May 17, 1991 (#91000557)	Western side of U.S. Route 11, 2.4 mi (3.9 km) north of Martinsburg; 39°29′14″N 77°56′49″W	Martinsburg	
53	Lee-Throckmorton-McDonald House	Lee-Throckmorton-McDonald House	April 14, 2004 (#04000312)	2101 Arden-Nolville Rd. 39°23′25″N 78°02′52″W	Inwood	
54	Lick Run Plantation	Lick Run Plantation	January 12, 1984 (#84003476)	Off U.S. Route 11; 39°31′10″N 77°54′02″W	Bedington	
55	Maidstone Manor Farm	Maidstone Manor Farm	December 10, 1980 (#80004408)	County Route 1/4; 39°35′14″N 77°54′32″W	Hedgesville	
56	Maidstone-on-the-Potomac	Maidstone-on-the-Potomac	April 15, 2004 (#04000311)	12 Temple Dr. 39°35′59″N 77°50′21″W	Falling Waters	
57	Marlowe Consolidated School	Marlowe Consolidated School	March 22, 2006 (#06000169)	9580 Williamsport Pike; 39°35′19″N 77°51′36″W	Marlowe	
58	Martinsburg Mining, Manufacturing & Improvement Co. Historic District	Martinsburg Mining, Manufacturing & Improvement Co. Historic District	December 16, 2002 (#02001519)	New York, Virginia, West Virginia, Maryland, Florida, and Faulkner Avenues; 39°26′59″N 77°58′26″W	Martinsburg	
59	James Mason House and Farm		November 15, 2006 (#06001044)	856 Little Georgetown Rd. 39°34′33″N 77°57′20″W	Hedgesville	
60	Gilbert and Samuel McKown House	Gilbert and Samuel McKown House	January 12, 1984 (#84003477)	WV 51; 39°22′02″N 78°05′23″W	Gerrardstown	
61	Mill Creek Historic District	Mill Creek Historic District	December 10, 1980 (#80004420)	Runs along Mill Creek extending both east and west of Bunker Hill; 39°20′45″N 78°03′41″W	Bunker Hill	
62	Miller Tavern and Farm	Miller Tavern and Farm	March 22, 2006 (#06000167)	Eastern side of Golf Course Rd. 39°25′19″N 77°52′55″W	Martinsburg	
63	Morgan Chapel and Graveyard	Morgan Chapel and Graveyard	January 12, 1984 (#84003480)	Northern side of County Route 26 west of its junction with U.S. Route 11; 39°20′01″N 78°03′28″W	Bunker Hill	
64	William G. Morgan House	William G. Morgan House	January 12, 1984 (#84003489)	On County Route 24, south of its junction with County Route 26; 39°19′53″N 78°05′53″W	Bunker Hill	
65	Morgan-Gold House	Morgan-Gold House	July 8, 1985 (#85001519)	WV 26; 39°19′56″N 78°04′40″W	Bunker Hill	
66	Mt. Pleasant School	Mt. Pleasant School	September 18, 2008 (#08000928)	Abiding Way; 39°21′49″N 78°07′28″W	Gerrardstown	
67	Mount Zion Baptist Church	Mount Zion Baptist Church	December 10, 1980 (#80004422)	Opequon Lane; 39°23′19″N 77°55′25″W	Martinsburg	
68	George W. F. Mulliss House	George W. F. Mulliss House	May 2, 1991 (#91000549)	Western side of U.S. Route 11, 1 mi (1.6 km) south of Martinsburg; 39°25′50″N 77°59′16″W	Martinsburg	
69	Myers House		December 10, 1980 (#80004423)	Union Corner at the end of Route 37/1; 39°30′17″N 77°55′25″W	Martinsburg	
70	Moses Nadenbousch House		February 11, 2004 (#04000032)	2540 Butler's Chapel Rd. 39°32′06″N 77°59′30″W	Martinsburg	
71	Newcomer Mansion	Newcomer Mansion	March 22, 2006 (#06000170)	1735 Douglas Grove Rd. 39°25′13″N 77°56′17″W	Martinsburg	
72	Opequon Golf Club	Opequon Golf Club	April 28, 1995 (#95000417)	Golf Club Rd. east of Opequon Creek; 39°26′30″N 77°55′19″W	Martinsburg	
73	Orndoff-Cross House	Orndoff-Cross House	July 28, 2010 (#08001403)	6 Winebrenner Rd. 39°26′09″N 77°51′38″W	Martinsburg vicinity	
74	Overlook	Overlook	April 15, 2004 (#04000310)	2910 Harlan Spring Rd. 39°32′48″N 77°57′28″W	Martinsburg	
75	Parks's Gap Bridge	Parks's Gap Bridge	November 4, 1994 (#94001299)	Route 6 over Back Creek; 39°30′45″N 78°02′11″W	Martinsburg	
76	Elias Pitzer House	Elias Pitzer House	January 8, 2003 (#02001689)	1076 Clyde Borum Rd. 39°25′29″N 78°01′15″W	Martinsburg	
77	Power Plant and Dam No. 4	Power Plant and Dam No. 4	December 10, 1980 (#80004437)	On the Potomac River north of County Route 5 at Scrabble; 39°29′42″N 77°49′34″W	Shepherdstown	
78	Power Plant and Dam No. 5	Power Plant and Dam No. 5	December 10, 1980 (#80004438)	On the Potomac River west of Marlowe; 39°36′22″N 77°55′23″W	Marlowe	
79	Rauch House	Rauch House	November 4, 1994 (#94001298)	Off WV 9, south of Martinsburg; 39°25′20″N 77°58′06″W	Martinsburg	
80	Redbud Hollow	Redbud Hollow	December 10, 1980 (#80004424)	Address Unknown; 39°23′42″N 78°04′32″W	Martinsburg	
81	John, David, and Jacob Rees House	John, David, and Jacob Rees House	January 12, 1984 (#84003495)	Off U.S. Route 11; 39°18′47″N 78°05′53″W	Bunker Hill	
82	Morris Rees III House	Morris Rees III House	January 8, 2003 (#02001681)	WV 24, 0.2 mi (0.32 km) south of WV 51; 39°21′26″N 78°05′06″W	Gerrardstown	
83	Ridge Road Historic District	Ridge Road Historic District	December 10, 1980 (#80004429)	South along Ridge Rd. from Nollville; 39°26′23″N 78°01′59″W	Nollville	
84	Robinson-Tabb House	Robinson-Tabb House	February 11, 2004 (#04000028)	377 Holden Dr. 39°30′50″N 77°59′07″W	Martinsburg	
85	Baker Ropp House		December 12, 2002 (#02001522)	2301 Harlan Spring Rd. 39°32′17″N 77°56′49″W	Martinsburg	
86	R.C. Ropp House		December 12, 2002 (#02001523)	2199 Harlan Spring Rd. 39°32′10″N 77°56′54″W	Martinsburg	
87	Rosemont Historic District	Rosemont Historic District	December 12, 2002 (#02001524)	Tennessee, Illinois, Georgia, and Kentucky Aves. 39°27′27″N 77°58′39″W	Martinsburg	
88	Rush-Miller House	Rush-Miller House	July 8, 1985 (#85001521)	On WV 45; 39°27′14″N 77°54′09″W	Smoketown	
89	George Schlack House	George Schlack House	September 18, 2008 (#08000927)	212 Speck's Run Rd. 39°17′45″N 78°03′51″W	Ridgeway	
90	Scrabble Historic District	Scrabble Historic District	March 22, 2006 (#06000171)	Scrabble Rd. and Dam No. 4 Rd. 39°29′11″N 77°49′59″W	Scrabble	
91	Henry J. Seibert II House	Henry J. Seibert II House	July 8, 1985 (#85001526)	Off WV 45; 39°26′11″N 78°00′43″W	Martinsburg	
92	Smoketown School		December 1, 1994 (#94001345)	County Route 45/4, east of Martinsburg; 39°27′32″N 77°54′20″W	Martinsburg	
93	Snodgrass Tavern	Snodgrass Tavern	April 24, 1973 (#73001896)	West of Hedgesville on WV 9; 39°33′25″N 78°01′00″W	Hedgesville	
94	Benjamin H. Snyder House	Benjamin H. Snyder House	February 11, 2004 (#04000029)	1925 Douglas Grove Rd. 39°25′17″N 77°56′21″W	Martinsburg	
95	South Water Street Historic District	South Water Street Historic District	December 10, 1980 (#80004430)	Roughly bounded by East John, South Water, and East Burke Sts., and Baltimore & Ohio railroad line 39°27′20″N 77°57′39″W	Martinsburg	
96	Peter Speck House		December 12, 2002 (#02001526)	1149 Ben Speck Rd. 39°32′51″N 77°58′57″W	Martinsburg	
97	Spring Mills Historic District	Spring Mills Historic District	April 15, 2004 (#04000308)	Portions of Hammonds Mill Rd. and Harlan Spring Rd. 39°33′36″N 77°57′12″W	Martinsburg	
98	Adam Stephen House	Adam Stephen House	October 15, 1970 (#70000650)	309 E. John St. 39°27′16″N 77°57′39″W	Martinsburg	
99	Stone House Mansion	Stone House Mansion	November 21, 1994 (#94001297)	Off WV 9, southeast of Martinsburg; 39°23′52″N 77°55′09″W	Martinsburg	
100	Strayer-Couchman House		November 21, 1994 (#94001291)	Warm Springs Rd. east of Martinsburg; 39°26′25″N 77°54′13″W	Martinsburg	
101	Strode-Morrison-Tabler House and Farm	Strode-Morrison-Tabler House and Farm	March 22, 2006 (#06000173)	1270 Jacobs Rd. 39°30′42″N 77°52′34″W	Hedgesville	
102	Stuckey House		May 17, 1991 (#91000555)	County Route 7/8, along Wilson Ridge; 39°29′11″N 78°05′02″W	Jones Springs	
103	Swan Pond	Swan Pond	July 29, 1977 (#77001372)	County Route 5/3; 39°28′15″N 77°52′25″W	Martinsburg	
104	Swan Pond Manor Historic District	Swan Pond Manor Historic District	December 10, 1980 (#80004425)	Swan Pond; 39°28′18″N 77°51′57″W	Martinsburg	
105	Edward Tabb House	Edward Tabb House	January 12, 1984 (#84003500)	On County Route 4 south of its junction with WV 9; 39°30′55″N 78°00′05″W	Hedgesville	
106	Tabler's Station Historic District	Tabler's Station Historic District	April 14, 2004 (#04000306)	Portions of Tabler's Station Rd. and Carlton Dr. 39°23′56″N 78°00′39″W	Martinsburg	
107	Thunder Hill Farm	Thunder Hill Farm	November 21, 1994 (#94001295)	County Route 30 north of Inwood; 39°22′59″N 78°03′19″W	Inwood	
108	Tomahawk Spring	Tomahawk Spring	December 1, 1994 (#94001344)	County Route 7/2; 39°31′52″N 78°03′27″W	Tomahawk	
109	Priscilla Strode Turner House	Priscilla Strode Turner House	December 12, 2002 (#02001527)	347 Carlyle Rd. 39°31′12″N 77°52′55″W	Bedington	
110	Tuscarora Creek Historic District	Tuscarora Creek Historic District	December 10, 1980 (#80004426)	Roughly bounded by N. Tennessee Ave., south on Old Mill Rd., to County Route 15; 39°28′10″N 77°59′08″W	Martinsburg	
111	Union Bryarly's Mill		December 10, 1980 (#80004440)	Address Unknown; 39°22′16″N 78°01′41″W	Darkesville	
112	Van Metre Ford Stone Bridge	Van Metre Ford Stone Bridge	August 22, 1977 (#77001373)	East of Martinsburg across Opequon Creek on Golf Course Road; 39°26′42″N 77°55′40″W	Martinsburg	
113	Jacob VanDoren House	Jacob VanDoren House	January 12, 1984 (#84003504)	1 mi (1.6 km) southwest of the junction of County Routes 40 and 45/3; 39°25′37″N 77°53′25″W	Martinsburg	
114	John VanMetre House	John VanMetre House	February 11, 2004 (#04000033)	177 Elsie Dr. 39°24′58″N 77°56′13″W	Kearneysville	
115	Nathan VanMetre House	Nathan VanMetre House	November 4, 1994 (#94001289)	Dry Run Rd. (County Route 13) north of Martinsburg; 39°29′09″N 77°59′16″W	Martinsburg	
116	Thomas VanMetre House	Thomas VanMetre House	December 30, 2009 (#09001189)	3093 Golf Course Rd. 39°25′55″N 77°54′05″W	Martinsburg	
117	Watkins Ferry Toll House		December 10, 1980 (#80004427)	Route 11; 39°35′50″N 77°50′23″W	Martinsburg	
118	West Martinsburg Historic District	West Martinsburg Historic District	December 13, 2010 (#07001414)	Roughly bounded by North St., N. & S. Tennessee Ave., West King St., and N. & S. Alabama Ave. 39°27′44″N 77°58′42″W	Martinsburg	Historic Residential Suburbs in the United States, 1830-1960 MPS
119	White Bush	White Bush	December 10, 1980 (#80004428)	Routes 11/3; 39°34′08″N 77°52′19″W	Falling Waters	
120	Mary Park Wilson House	Mary Park Wilson House	July 8, 1985 (#85001524)	Destiny Drive; 39°22′18″N 78°06′30″W	Gerrardstown	
121	William Wilson House	William Wilson House	January 12, 1984 (#84003508)	WV 51; 39°22′33″N 78°06′20″W	Gerrardstown	

== See also ==
- List of National Historic Landmarks in West Virginia
- National Register of Historic Places listings in West Virginia
