= Ropp =

Ropp may refer to:

== Surnames ==
- Gordon Ropp, American farmer and politician
- Robert S de Ropp, biochemist
- Theodore Ropp, American military historian
- William de Ropp, British intelligence agent
- Eduard von der Ropp, Russian Roman Catholic archbishop

== Locations ==
- R.C. Ropp House, historic home in West Virginia, United States
- Ropp, Nigeria, a village in Plateau State, Nigeria
- Baker Ropp House, historic home in West Virginia, United States

== Abbreviations ==
- Roll-on Pilfer Proof - a type of screw cap where the thread is formed by pressure against the container
