= Overlook (disambiguation) =

An overlook is a high place where people can view scenery.

Overlook may also refer to:

== Arts ==
- The Overlook, a crime novel by Michael Connelly
- Overlook (album), a 2011 album by Maria Taylor
- The Overlook (collection), a 1999 fashion collection by Alexander McQueen
- Overlook Hotel, the setting for the Stephen King novel The Shining
- The Overlook Press, a publishing house

== Buildings ==
- Overlook (Little Falls, New York), a historic home
- Overlook (Martinsburg, West Virginia), a historic home
- Overlook Castle, in Asheville, North Carolina

== Places ==
- Overlook, Portland, Oregon, a neighborhood of Portland, Oregon
- Overlook Colony, Delaware, an unincorporated community in the United States
- Overlook Mountain, in the Catskill Mountains of New York
- Mount Overlook, in Antarctica

== See also ==
- Overwatch (disambiguation)
- Overlooked (disambiguation)
