= Thunderhill (disambiguation) =

Thunderhill may refer to:

- Thunderhill Raceway Park, a paved motorsports complex in Sacramento Valley, California.

== Motorsports ==
- The Hill Raceway (formerly Thunderhill Raceway), a stock car dirt track located in Sturgeon Bay, Wisconsin.
- Central Texas Speedway (formerly Thunderhill Raceway), was a paved D-shaped oval racing track located in Kyle, Texas.

== Sports and recreation ==
- Thunderhill Ski Area, A ski resort in the Swan River Valley region of Manitoba, Canada.
- Thunder Hill Provincial Park, a protected provincial park located in British Columbia, Canada.

== Historic structures ==
- Thunder Hill Farm, a historic plantation and home near Inwood, Berkeley County, West Virginia.
