= Overwatch (disambiguation) =

Overwatch is a multimedia franchise based on a multiplayer shooter video game series.

Overwatch may also refer to:

== Media and entertainment ==
=== Overwatch franchise ===
- Overwatch (2016 video game), the first game in the series, retroactively referred to as Overwatch 1 or Overwatch Classic
- Overwatch (2023 video game), the second game in the series, originally titled Overwatch 2
- Overwatch animated media
- Overwatch (digital comic series)
- Overwatch League, an esports league for the video game series

=== Other uses in media and entertainment ===
- Overwatch, the military forces of the Combine in the video game Half-Life 2
- Overwatch, the alias of the DC Comics character Felicity Smoak in the television series Arrow

== Military ==
- Overwatch (military tactic)
  - Bounding overwatch, another military tactic
- Overwatch Battle Group (West), a former Australian Army unit
- Armed Overwatch

== Other uses ==
- Overwatch, now Geospatial Solutions, a company owned by Textron Systems

== See also ==
- Overlook (disambiguation)
