= Overlooked =

Overlooked may refer to:

- Overlooked (album), by Caroline's Spine
- Overlooked (obituary feature), a recurring feature published in The New York Times

== See also ==
- Overlook (disambiguation)
