= Jones Springs, West Virginia =

Jones Springs
- Unincorporated community
- Location within the state of West Virginia Jones Springs (the United States)
- Coordinates: 39°29′29″N 78°05′43″W
- Country: United States
- State: West Virginia
- County: Berkeley
- Elevation: 577 ft (176 m)
- Time zone: UTC-5 (Eastern (EST))
  - Summer (DST): UTC-4 (EDT)
- GNIS feature ID: 1554830

Jones Springs is an unincorporated community in Berkeley County, West Virginia, United States. It is located on County Route 7 at its junction with County Route 7/8. The town, and several of its houses, are adjacent to the numerous springs that give the community its name.

Located near Jones Springs is the Stuckey House, listed on the National Register of Historic Places in 1991.
