= Thomas VanMetre House =

Historic house in West Virginia, United States

- U.S. National Register of Historic Places
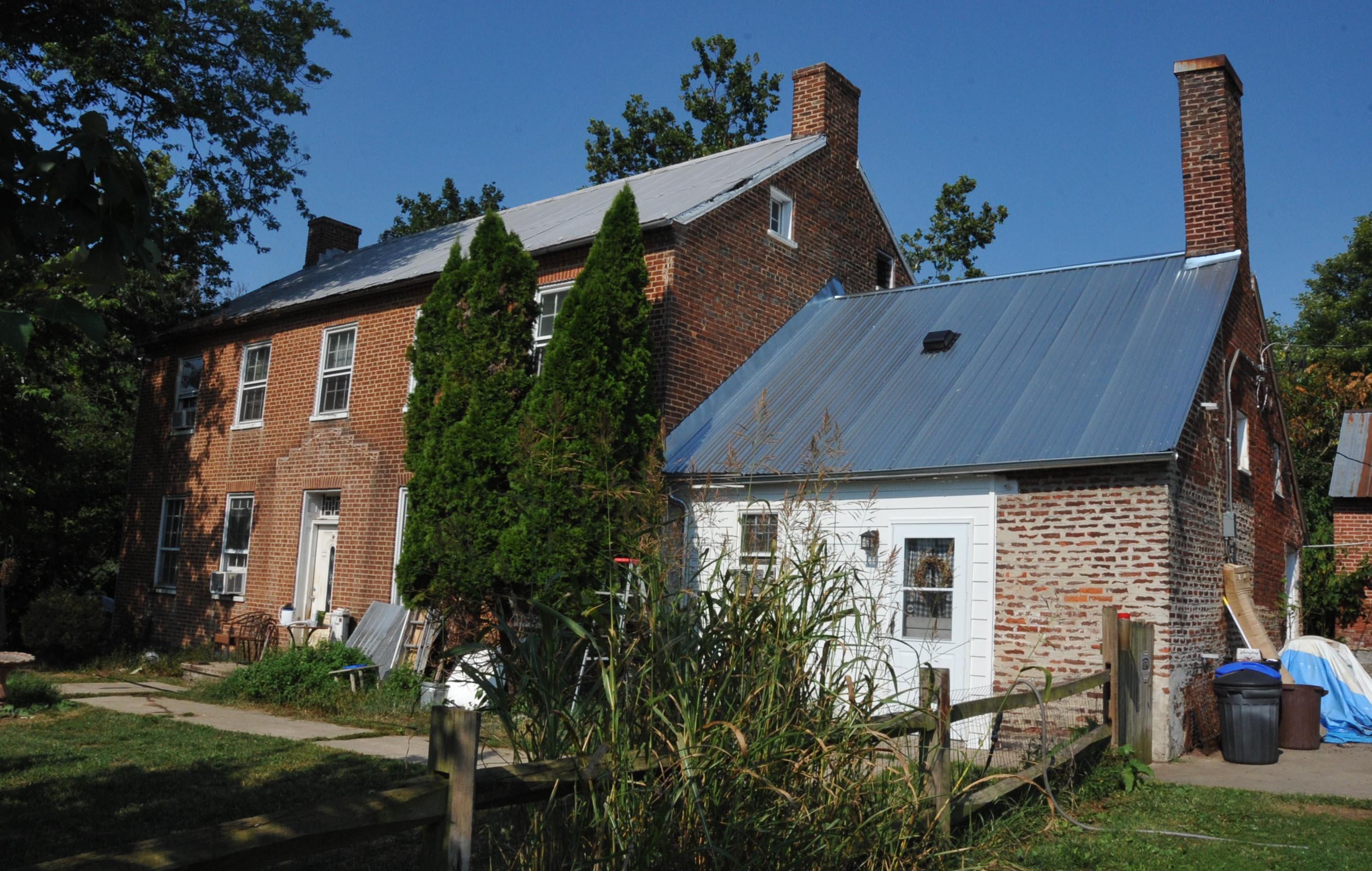

- Location within West Virginia Location within the United States
- Location: 3093 Golf Course Rd., near Martinsburg, West Virginia
- Coordinates: 39°25′54.75″N 77°54′5.39″W
- Area: 1.51 acres (0.61 ha)
- Built: 1838, 1847
- NRHP reference No.: 09001189
- Added to NRHP: December 30, 2009

Thomas VanMetre or Vanmetre House is a historic home located near Martinsburg, Berkeley County, West Virginia, USA. It was built in 1838 and is a two-story, five-bay, red brick vernacular "I"-house. It has a side gable roof and a single bay, pedimented portico supported by Doric order columns. Also on the property is summer kitchen (c. 1838).

It was listed on the National Register of Historic Places in 2010.
