= Watkins Ferry Toll House =

- U.S. National Register of Historic Places
- Location within West Virginia Location within the United States
- Location: Rt. 11, Martinsburg, West Virginia
- Coordinates: 39°35′50″N 77°50′23″W
- Area: 1 acre (0.40 ha)
- Built: 1837
- Architectural style: Greek Revival
- MPS: Berkeley County MRA
- NRHP reference No.: 80004427
- Added to NRHP: December 10, 1980

Watkins Ferry Toll House was a historic toll house located at Martinsburg, Berkeley County, West Virginia. It was built in 1837, as a small rectangular stone building, measuring approximately 17 feet wide by 23 feet deep. It had a gable roof and featured Greek Revival-style architectural details. While being used as a private dwelling, sadly it burned on February 8, 1985. The remains of its foundation were finally removed in early 2004 to make room for a housing development.

It is listed on the National Register of Historic Places since 1980.
