= Decatur Hedges House =

Historic house in West Virginia, United States

- U.S. National Register of Historic Places
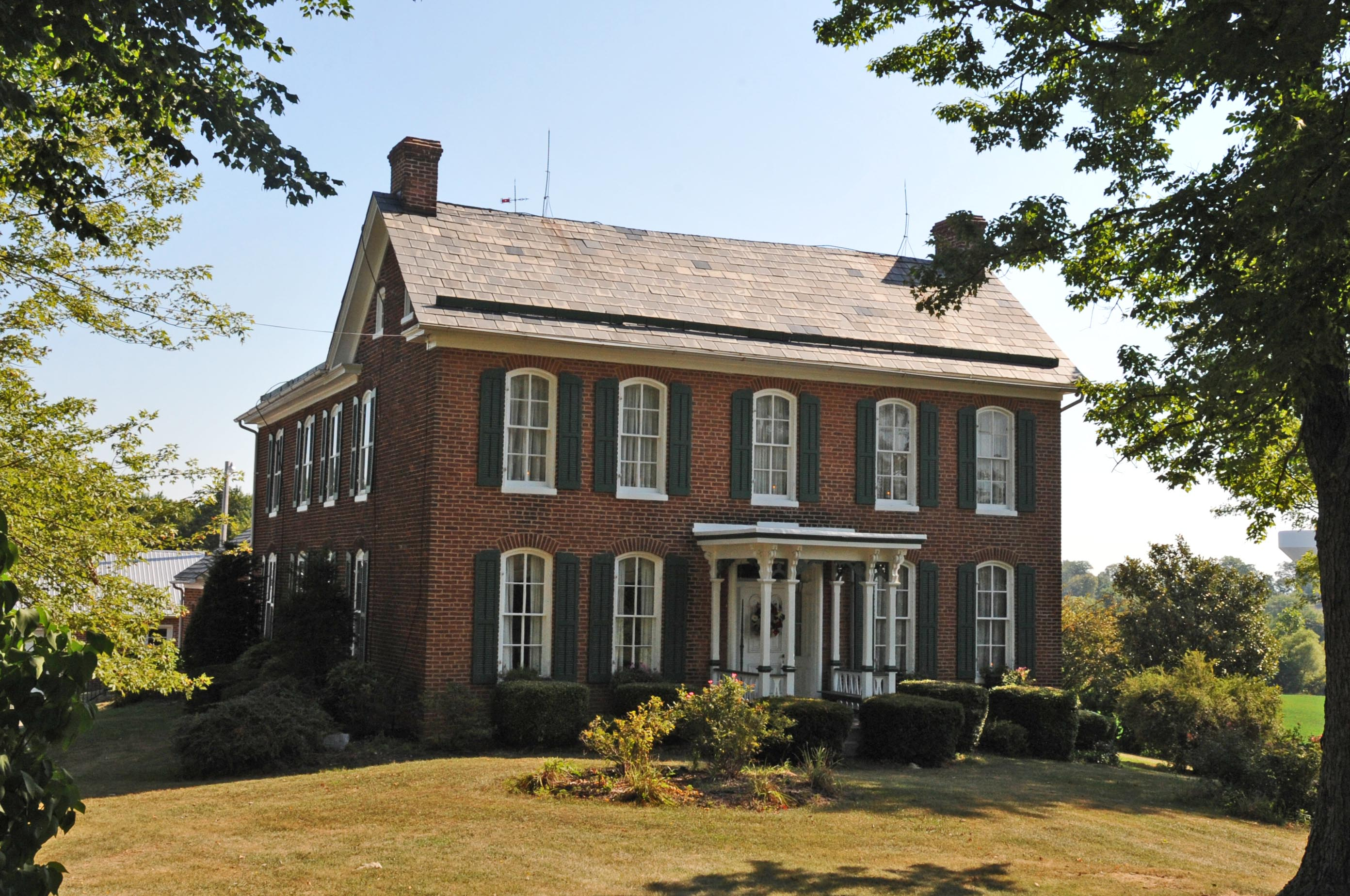

- Location within West Virginia Location within the United States
- Location: WV 9, near Hedgesville, West Virginia
- Coordinates: 39°30′48″N 77°58′20″W
- Area: 1 acre (0.40 ha)
- Built: 1874
- Architectural style: Gothic, Vernacular Victorian Gothic
- NRHP reference No.: 84003473
- Added to NRHP: January 12, 1984

Decatur Hedges House is a historic home located near Hedgesville, Berkeley County, West Virginia. It was built in 1874 and is a two-story, five-bay, L-shaped brick dwelling. It measures 38 feet wide by 48 feet deep and sits on a stone foundation. Also on the property is a one-story, gable roofed brick outbuilding.

It was listed on the National Register of Historic Places in 1984.
