= Peter Speck House =

Historic house in West Virginia, United States

- U.S. National Register of Historic Places
- Location within West Virginia Location within the United States
- Location: 1149 Ben Speck Rd., near Martinsburg, West Virginia
- Coordinates: 39°32′51″N 77°58′57″W
- Area: less than one acre
- Built: c. 1814 - 1815
- Architectural style: Federal
- NRHP reference No.: 02001526
- Added to NRHP: December 12, 2002

Peter Speck House is a historic home located near Martinsburg, Berkeley County, West Virginia. It was built between 1814 and 1815, and consists of a two-story, two-bay, log section with a gable roof (c. 1814) attached to a two-story, two-bay, gable-roofed stone section (c. 1815). The building dates to the Federal period. It features a one-story, hip-roof front porch added in the early 1900s. Also on the property is a fieldstone spring house (c. 1815).

It was listed on the National Register of Historic Places in 2002.
