= Harlan Spring Historic District =

Historic district in West Virginia, United States

- U.S. National Register of Historic Places
- U.S. Historic district
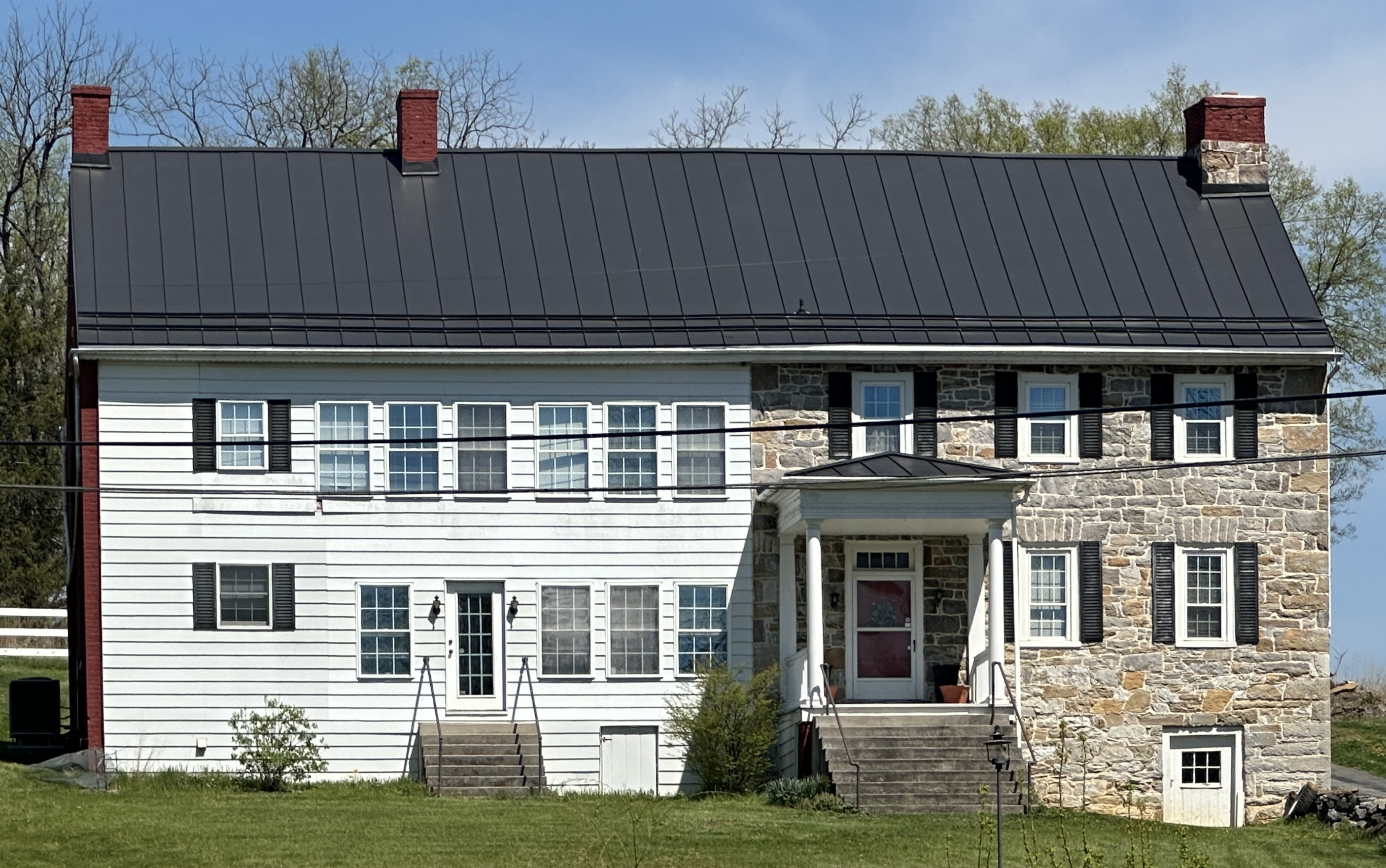
- The Willows was built in 1812 and the 1850s

- Location within West Virginia Location within the United States
- Location: Harlan Spring, Hedgesville, West Virginia
- Coordinates: 39°32′59″N 77°57′21″W
- Area: 18 acres (7.3 ha)
- Architect: Multiple
- MPS: Berkeley County MRA
- NRHP reference No.: 80004435
- Added to NRHP: December 10, 1980

Harlan Spring Historic District is a national historic district located at Hedgesville, Berkeley County, West Virginia. It encompasses seven contributing buildings related to the early settlement of Berkeley County. They include the Spring Hill log house (ca. 1740), The Harlan Cottage (c. 1860), "The Willows" (c. 1812), and Lingamfelter House.

It was listed on the National Register of Historic Places in 1980.
