= Clary's Mountain Historic District =

Historic district in West Virginia, United States

- U.S. National Register of Historic Places
- U.S. Historic district
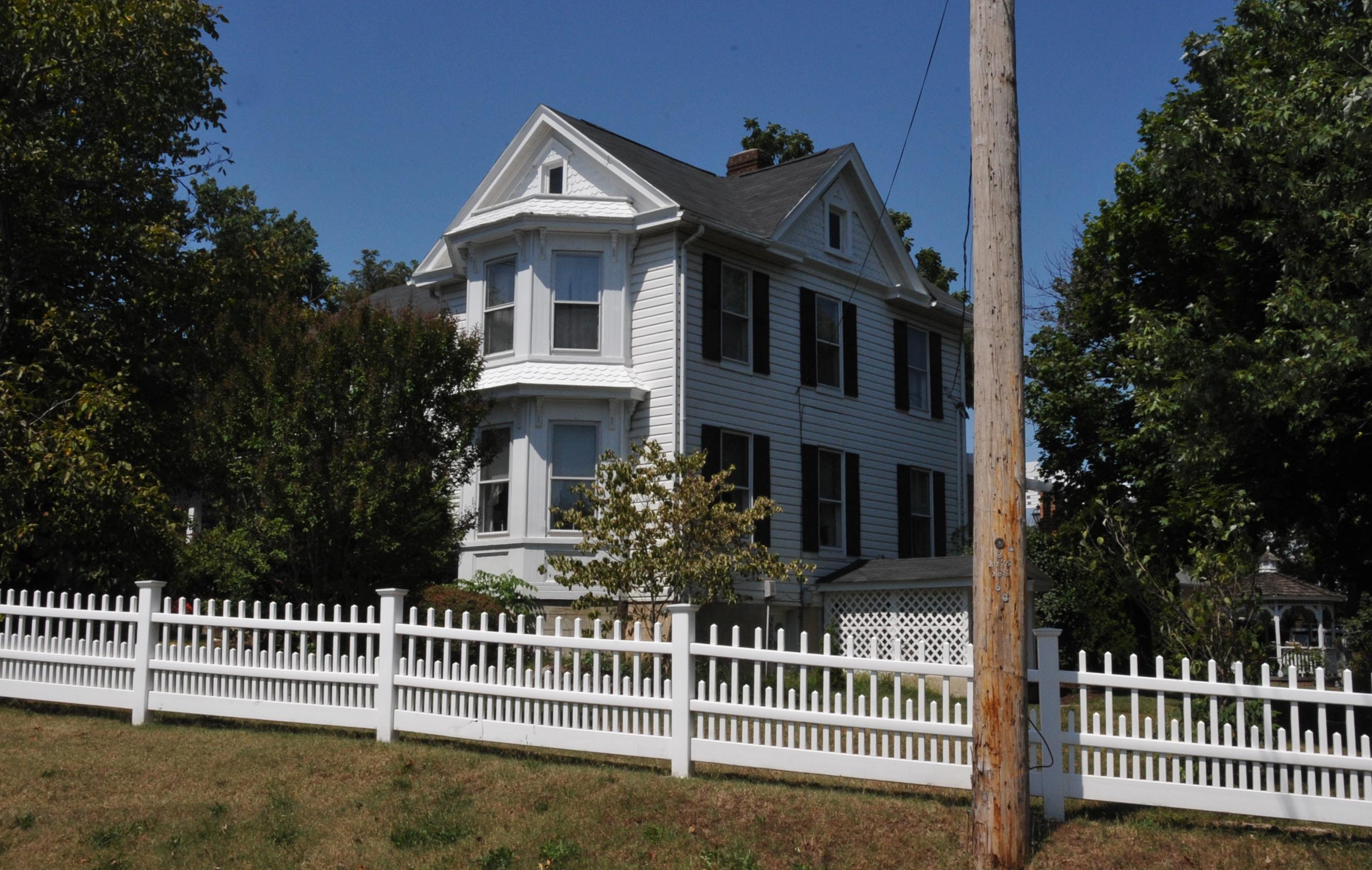

- Location within West Virginia Location within the United States
- Location: Hammond's Mill Rd. Hedgesville, West Virginia
- Coordinates: 39°33′25″N 77°59′22″W
- Area: 8 acres (3.2 ha)
- Architectural style: Gothic Revival, Late Victorian
- NRHP reference No.: 04000314
- Added to NRHP: April 15, 2004

The Clary's Mountain Historic District comprises 8 acres (3.2 ha) on either side of Hammond's Mill Road east of Hedgesville, West Virginia. The district contains six mostly wood-framed houses from the late 19th and early 20th century, with a total of twelve structures, including outbuildings. The oldest house, the Thomas Payne House at Hammond's Mill Road, was built in 1879. The Ward-Lemaster House (612 Hammond's Mill Road)) was built in 1905 with eclectic detailing. 627 Hammond's Mill Road was built about 1894. The Lee Lingamfelter House at 611 incorporates Eastlake detailing. The Dr. D.R. Ross House at 589 was built in 1885, and the Morris-Kilmer House is an American Foursquare from about 1920.

The neighborhood lies at the foot of Potato Hill, a component of the North Mountain ridge. The district was listed on the National Register of Historic Places on April 15, 2004.
