= Strayer-Couchman House =

Historic house in West Virginia, United States

- U.S. National Register of Historic Places
- Location within West Virginia Location within the United States
- Location: Warm Springs Rd. east of Martinsburg, near Martinsburg, West Virginia
- Coordinates: 39°26′32″N 77°54′13″W
- Area: 0.5 acres (0.20 ha)
- Built: 1810
- Architectural style: Greek Revival
- NRHP reference No.: 94001291
- Added to NRHP: November 21, 1994

The Strayer-Couchman House, also known as the Couchman House or Susan Couchman House, is a historic home located near Martinsburg, Berkeley County, West Virginia. It was built around 1850 and is a two-story, L-shaped, clapboard-sided log house in the Greek Revival style. The house features a gable roof and a one-story, one-bay entrance porch with a flat roof. The oldest section of the rear ell was constructed around 1810 and was connected to the main house between 1860 and 1880.

The Strayer-Couchman House was listed on the National Register of Historic Places in 1994.
