= Stuckey House =

Historic house in West Virginia, United States

- U.S. National Register of Historic Places
- Location within West Virginia Location within the United States
- Location: County Route 7/8, along Wilson Ridge, near Jones Springs, West Virginia
- Coordinates: 39°29′11″N 78°5′2″W
- Area: 2 acres (0.81 ha)
- Built: 1820
- Architectural style: Federal
- NRHP reference No.: 91000555
- Added to NRHP: May 17, 1991

Stuckey House is a historic home located near Jones Springs, Berkeley County, West Virginia. It was built in the 1820s, and is a two-story, three-bay, central block of cut limestone, with a 1 1/2-story rubble limestone, three-bay wing. The house dates to the Federal period and has a steeply sloped gable roof. Also on the property is a limestone springhouse, log smoke house, and "necessary".

It was listed on the National Register of Historic Places in 1991.
