= Rush-Miller House =

Historic house in West Virginia, United States

- U.S. National Register of Historic Places
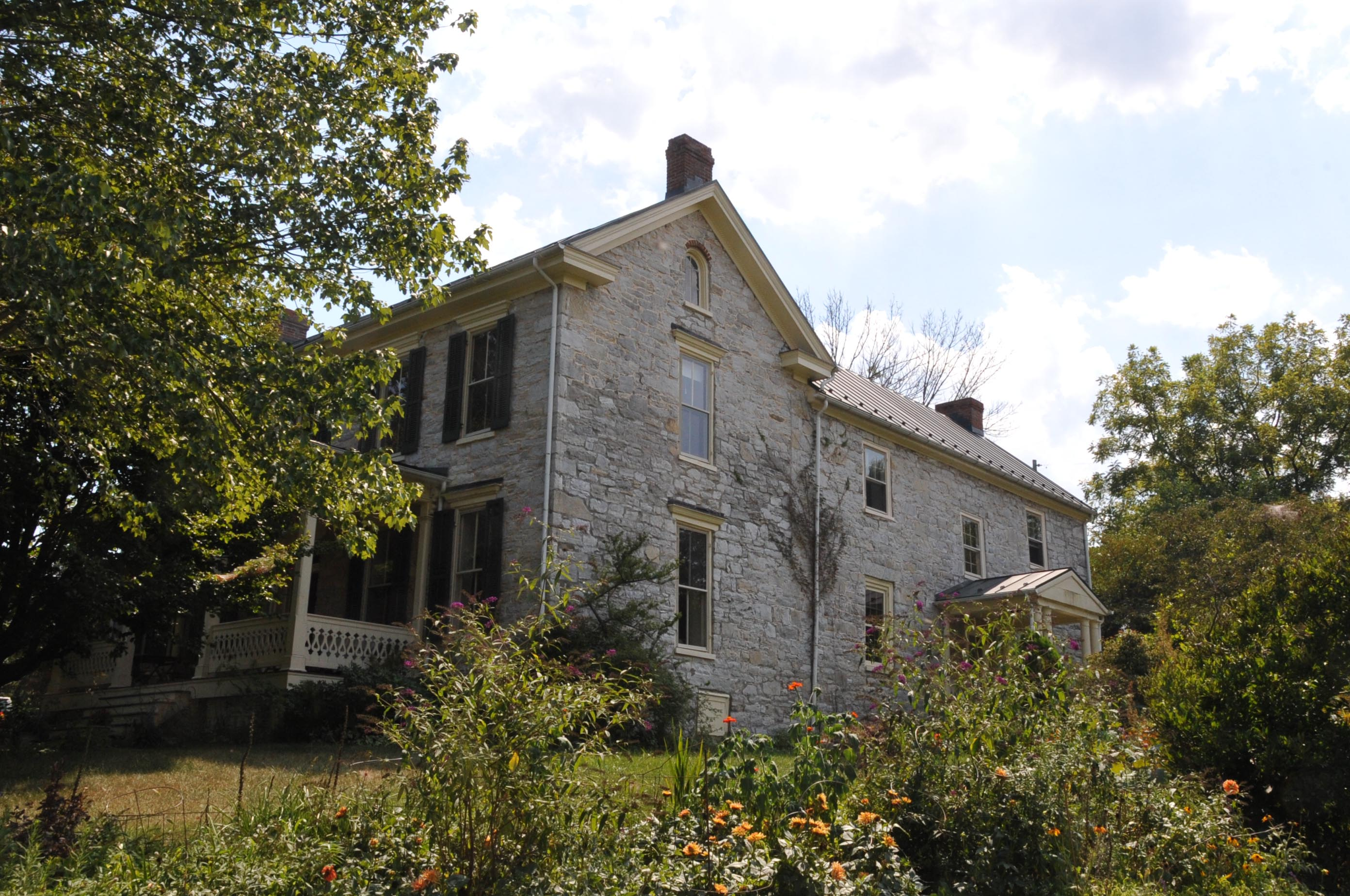

- Location within West Virginia Location within the United States
- Location: On WV 45, near Smoketown, West Virginia
- Coordinates: 39°27′14″N 77°54′9″W
- Area: 4 acres (1.6 ha)
- Built: 1810
- Architect: Rush, William; Miller, Jacob
- Architectural style: Romanesque, Federal
- NRHP reference No.: 85001521
- Added to NRHP: July 8, 1985

Rush-Miller House is a historic home located near Smoketown, Berkeley County, West Virginia. It is a two-story, L-shaped, stone dwelling with a gable roof. It is five bays wide and three bays deep. The rear ell was built about 1810 in the Federal style. The front two-story section was added about 1873. It is five bays wide and is of pounded rubble limestone in the Romanesque style. Also on the property is a stone bank barn (1909), stone and frame smoke house, and a stone springhouse.

It was listed on the National Register of Historic Places in 1985.
