= Edward Colston House =

Historic house in West Virginia, United States

- U.S. National Register of Historic Places
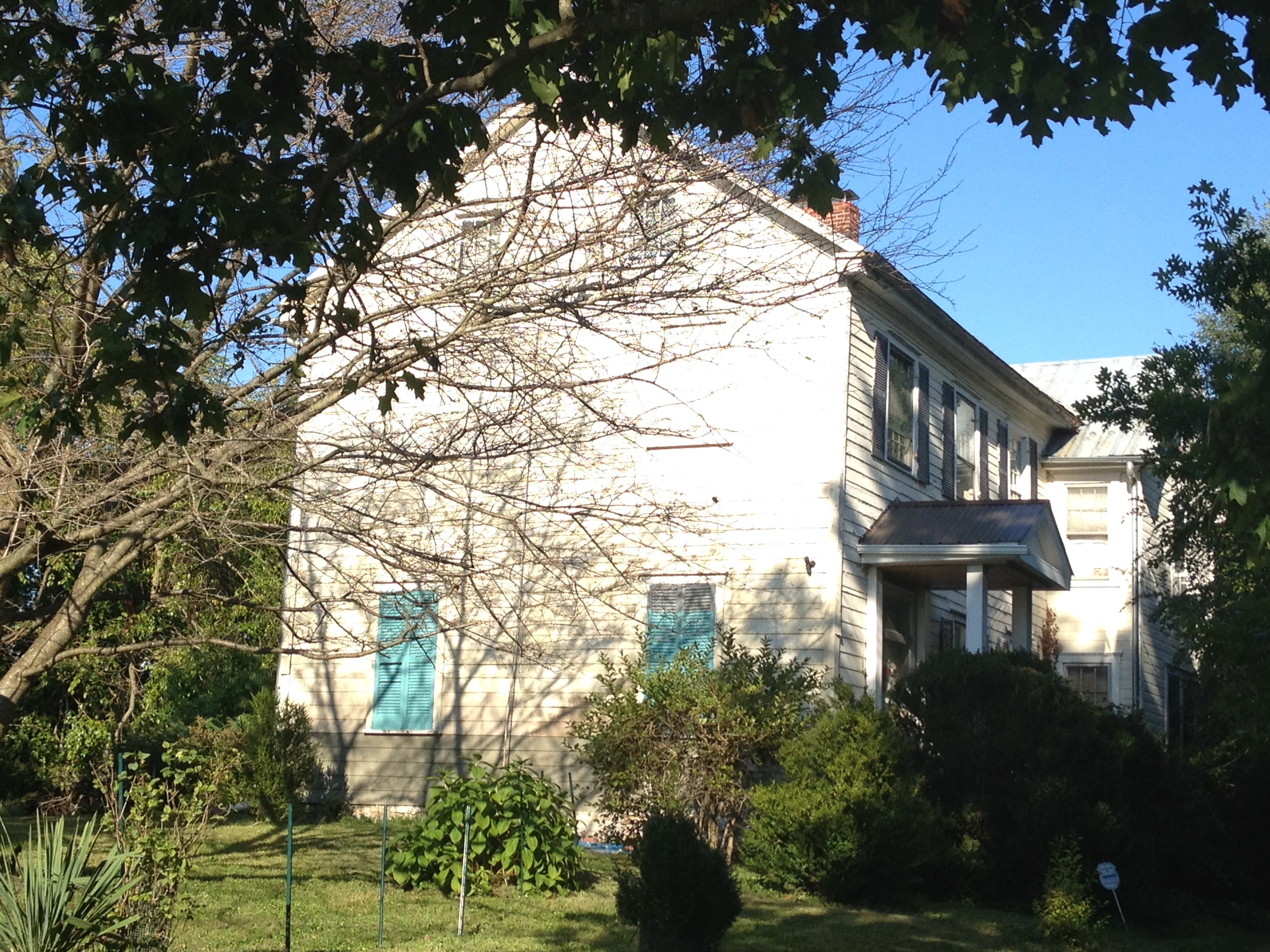

- Location within West Virginia Location within the United States
- Location: 1598 Tice Rd., Falling Waters, West Virginia
- Coordinates: 39°35′26″N 77°55′15″W
- Area: 7.5 acres (3.0 ha)
- Built: 1798
- Architectural style: Georgian, Federal
- NRHP reference No.: 03000347
- Added to NRHP: May 1, 2003

Edward Colston House, also known as Medway, is a historic home located at Falling Waters, Berkeley County, West Virginia. It was built about 1798 and is a two-story, three-bay, gable-roofed frame dwelling. The two-story, three-bay, gable-roofed frame wing was added about 1900. It is a rare 18th-century frame building and representative of the transition from the Georgian to Federal style.

It was listed on the National Register of Historic Places in 2003.
