= Washington Gold House =

Historic house in West Virginia, United States

- U.S. National Register of Historic Places
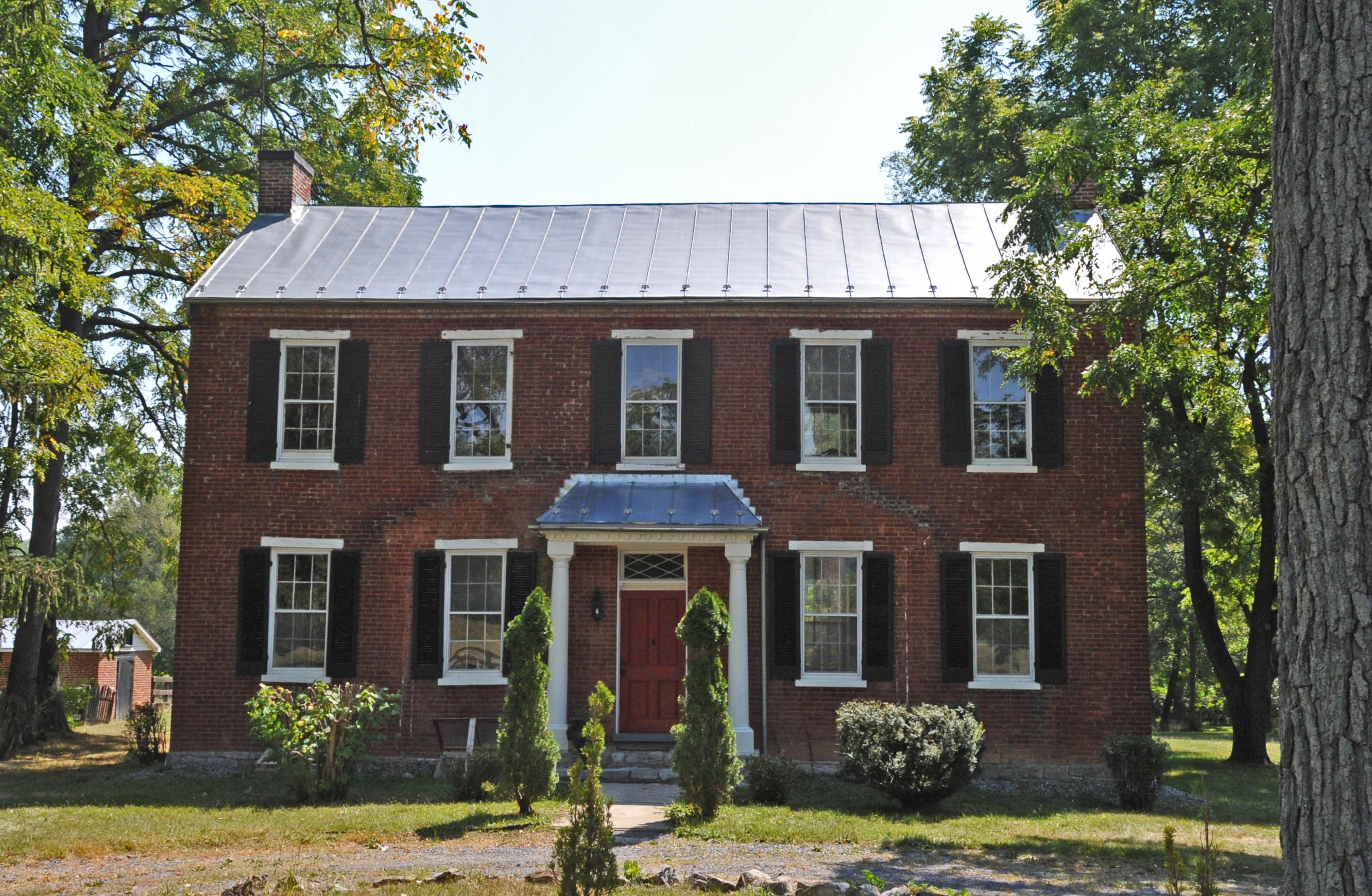

- Location within West Virginia Location within the United States
- Location: South of Gerrardstown on County Route 51/2, near Gerrardstown, West Virginia
- Coordinates: 39°21′12″N 78°6′35″W
- Area: 2 acres (0.81 ha)
- Built: 1761
- Architect: Washington Gold, Joseph Rippey
- Architectural style: Greek Revival
- NRHP reference No.: 84003470
- Added to NRHP: January 12, 1984

Washington Gold House, also known as "Mountain View" Farm, is a historic home located near Gerrardstown, Berkeley County, West Virginia, United States. It was built in 1854 and is a two-story, L-shaped brick dwelling in the Greek Revival style. The house is in two sections; the front section is five bays wide and the rear section four bays deep. The front facade features a Victorian entrance porch added about 1890. Also on the property is a carriage house (c. 1890) and small long cabin, known as the Rippey cabin (c. 1760) for the original owner.

It was listed on the National Register of Historic Places in 1984.
