= Miller Tavern and Farm =

Historic house in West Virginia, United States

- U.S. National Register of Historic Places
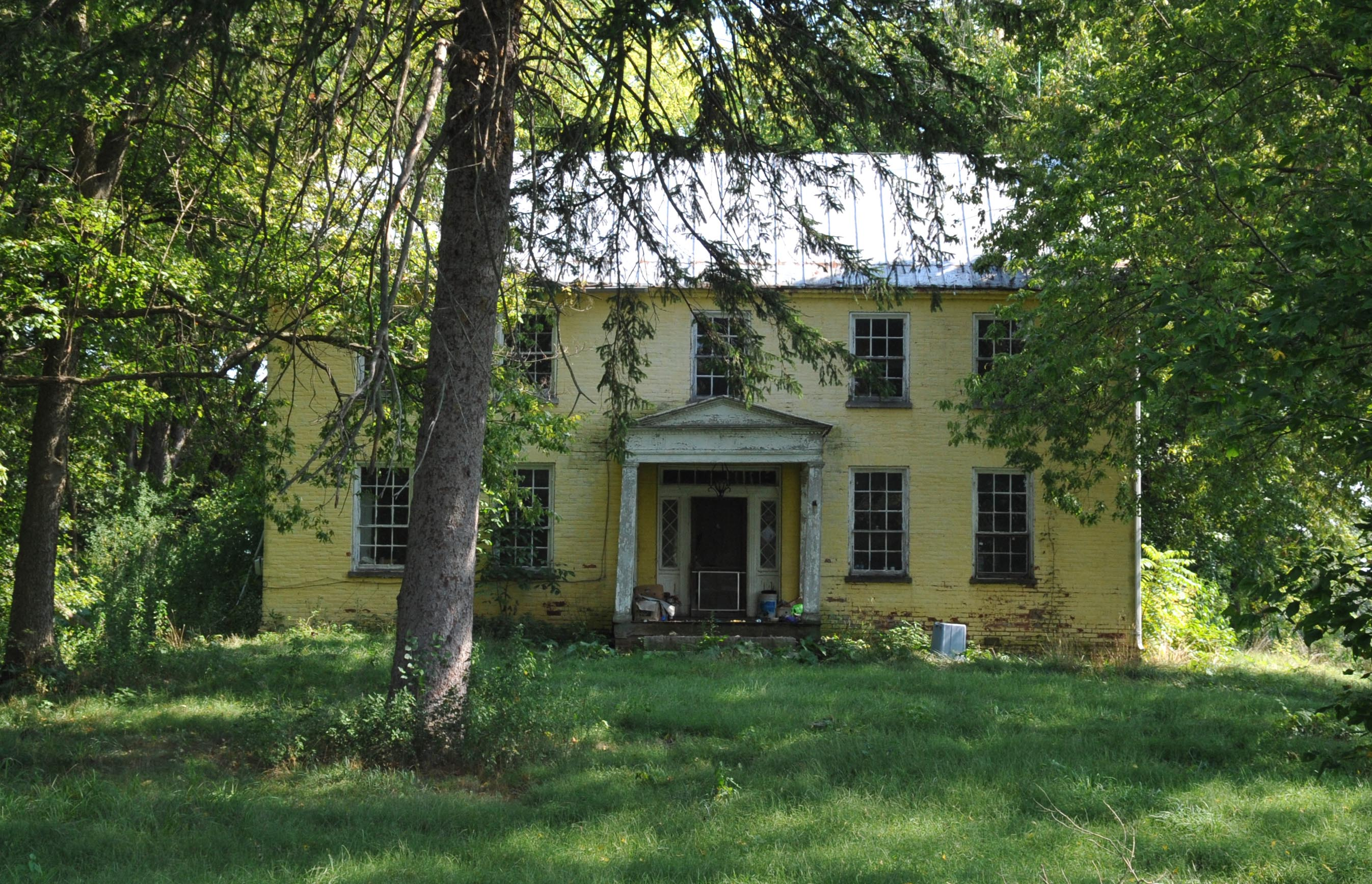

- Location within West Virginia Location within the United States
- Location: Eastern side of Golf Course Rd., near Martinsburg, West Virginia
- Coordinates: 39°25′19″N 77°52′55″W
- Area: 251 acres (102 ha)
- Built: c. 1831
- Architectural style: Greek Revival, Side passage half I-house
- NRHP reference No.: 06000167
- Added to NRHP: March 22, 2006

Miller Tavern and Farm is a historic home and farm located near Martinsburg, Berkeley County, West Virginia. The main house is L-shaped and consists of a vernacular tavern building, built about 1813, to which is appended a Greek Revival-style "I"-house built about 1831. The house of painted brick and wood construction. It has an intersecting gable roof structure clad in standing seam metal. Also on the contributing property is the Dr. John Magruder House (c. 1880), privy (c. 1935), smokehouse (c. 1900), barn (c. 1900), bank barn (c. 1900), and two sheds (c. 1900).

It was listed on the National Register of Historic Places in 2006.
