= Ridge Road Historic District =

Historic district in West Virginia, United States

- U.S. National Register of Historic Places
- U.S. Historic district
- Location within West Virginia Location within the United States
- Location: South along Ridge Rd. from Nollville, near Nollville, West Virginia
- Coordinates: 39°26′23″N 78°1′59″W
- Area: 10 acres (4.0 ha)
- Built: 1900
- Architectural style: Greek Revival, Federal
- MPS: Berkeley County MRA
- NRHP reference No.: 80004429
- Added to NRHP: December 10, 1980

Ridge Road Historic District is a national historic district located near Nollville, Berkeley County, West Virginia. It encompasses six contributing buildings and two contributing sites, related to the early settlement and economic development along Apple Pie Ridge. They buildings are the: Harriett Lyle Henshaw House, Smith Miller House (1850s), Philip Pendleton House (c. 1785), Noll-Rentch House, and Noll House (c. 1780). The Isabella Lyle House (1802) burned in a fire on February 28, 1999.

It was listed on the National Register of Historic Places in 1980.
