= George W. F. Mulliss House =

Historic house in West Virginia, United States

- U.S. National Register of Historic Places
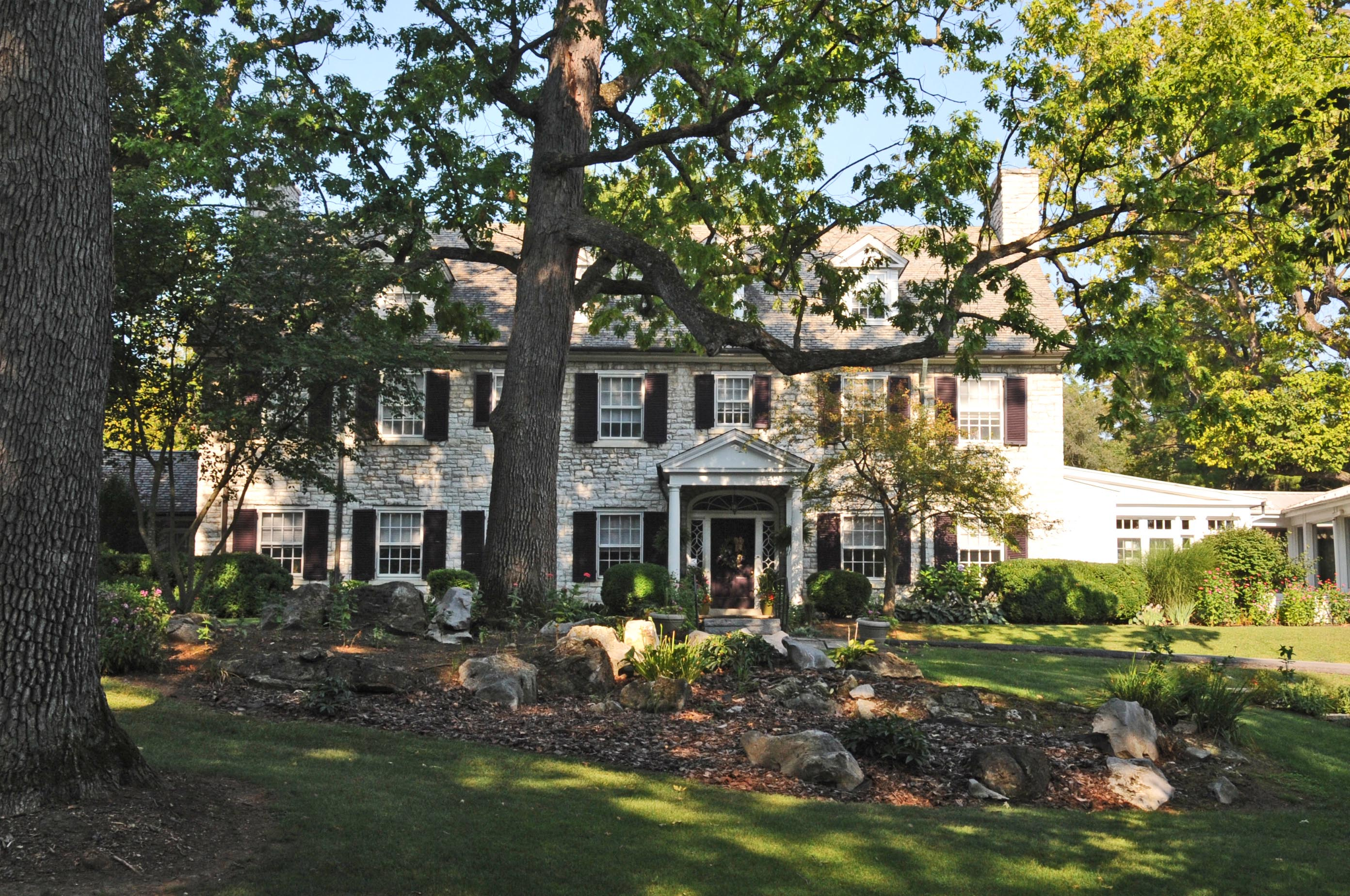

- Location within West Virginia Location within the United States
- Location: Western side of U.S. Route 11, 1 mi (1.6 km) south of Martinsburg, near Martinsburg, West Virginia
- Coordinates: 39°25′50″N 77°59′16″W
- Area: 6 acres (2.4 ha)
- Built: 1929
- Architect: Merchant, Alexander
- Architectural style: Neo Georgian Revival
- NRHP reference No.: 91000549
- Added to NRHP: May 2, 1991

George W. F. Mulliss House, also known as "Hartwood'", is a historic home located near Martinsburg, Berkeley County, West Virginia. It was built in 1929 and is a large 2 1/2-story, neo-Georgian Revival-style dwelling built of limestone reinforced with steel. It measures 97 feet wide and 39 feet deep, and consists of a seven bay central block with wings. Also on the property is a three bay, 1 1/2-story garage.

It was listed on the National Register of Historic Places in 1991.
