= Newcomer Mansion =

Historic house in West Virginia, United States

- U.S. National Register of Historic Places
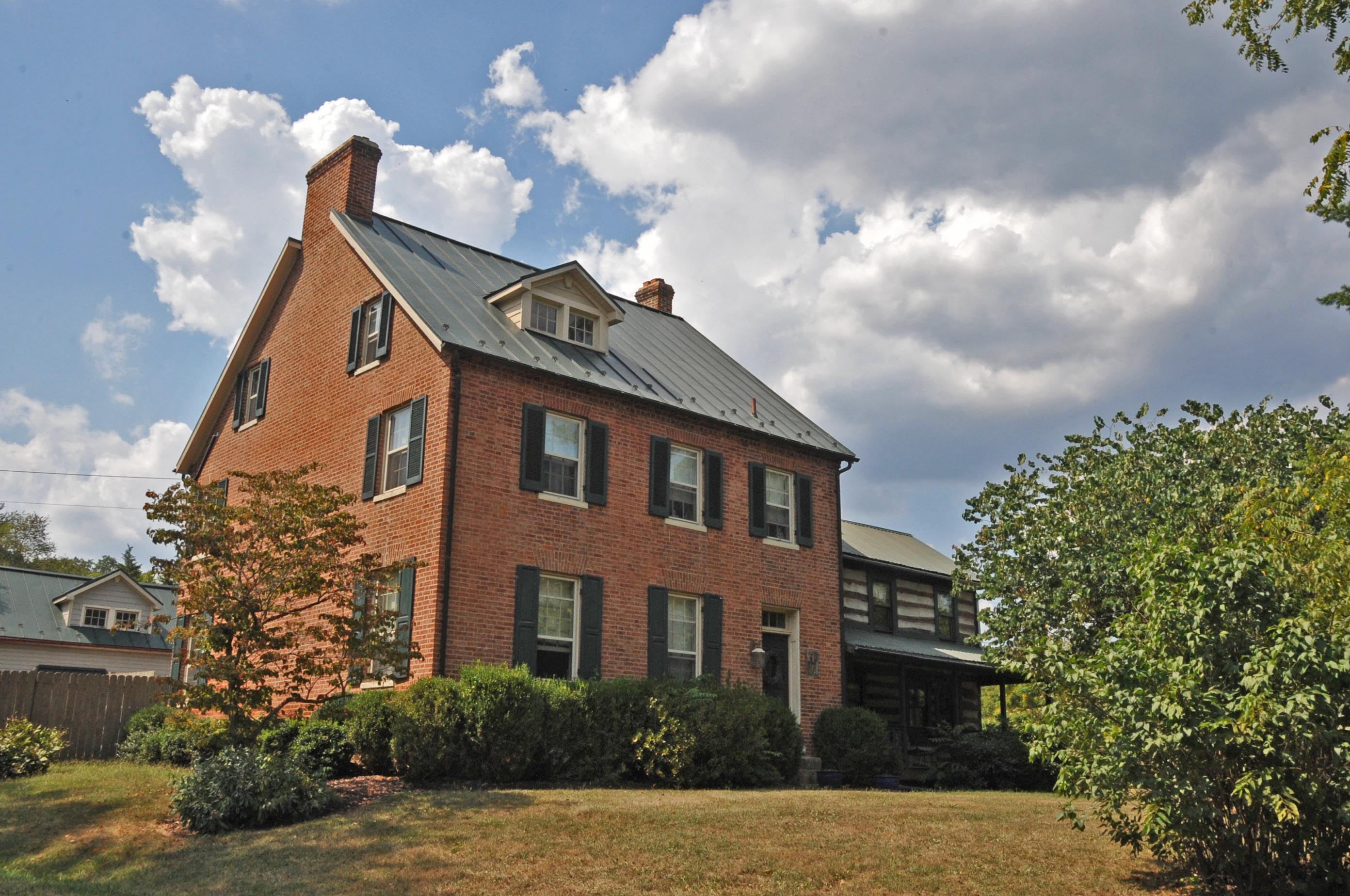

- Location within West Virginia Location within the United States
- Location: 1735 Douglas Grove Rd., near Martinsburg, West Virginia
- Coordinates: 39°25′13″N 77°56′17″W
- Area: 1.4 acres (0.57 ha)
- Built: 1820
- Architectural style: Federal
- NRHP reference No.: 06000170
- Added to NRHP: March 22, 2006

Newcomer Mansion is a historic home located near Martinsburg, Berkeley County, West Virginia. It was built about 1820 and consists of a 2 1/2-story, three-bay, Federal-style brick house with a two-story, two bay by one bay log house appended. The main section measures 33 feet by 36 feet. Also on the property is a contributing garage (1940). It was built by Jacob Newcomer, a son of Christian Newcomer (1749–1830), one of the founders of the Church of the United Brethren in Christ denomination.

In conjunction with a Section 106 study associated with improvements to Route 9, Newcomer Mansion was determined eligible for the National Register by the West Virginia State Historic Preservation Officer on August 7, 1997; this Determination of Eligibility was affirmed by the Keeper of the National Register on July 24, 1998.

It was listed on the National Register of Historic Places in 2006.
