= Nollville, West Virginia =

Nollville
- Unincorporated community
- Location within the state of West Virginia Nollville (the United States)
- Coordinates: 39°27′45″N 78°01′12″W
- Country: United States
- State: West Virginia
- County: Berkeley
- Elevation: 558 ft (170 m)
- Time zone: UTC-5 (Eastern (EST))
  - Summer (DST): UTC-4 (EDT)
- GNIS feature ID: 1555231

Nollville is an unincorporated community on Tuscarora Creek in Berkeley County, West Virginia, United States. It lies west of Martinsburg on the Tuscarora Pike (County Route 15).

Located near Nollville are the Ridge Road Historic District and Tuscarora Creek Historic District, both listed on the National Register of Historic Places in 1980.
