= Smoketown School =

- U.S. National Register of Historic Places
- Location within West Virginia Location within the United States
- Location: County Route 45/4, east of Martinsburg, near Martinsburg, West Virginia
- Coordinates: 39°27′32″N 77°54′20″W
- Area: 0.5 acres (0.20 ha)
- Built: 1869
- Architectural style: Greek Revival
- NRHP reference No.: 94001345
- Added to NRHP: December 1, 1994

Smoketown School was a historic one-room school located near Martinsburg, Berkeley County, West Virginia. It was built in 1869, and is a one-story, brick building in a vernacular Greek Revival style. It was used as a school until 1940, and the property was later sold to the Greensburg United Methodist Church.

It was listed on the National Register of Historic Places in 1994.

The building was condemned in June 2012 and razed the next month.
