= Elias Pitzer House =

Historic house in West Virginia, United States

- U.S. National Register of Historic Places
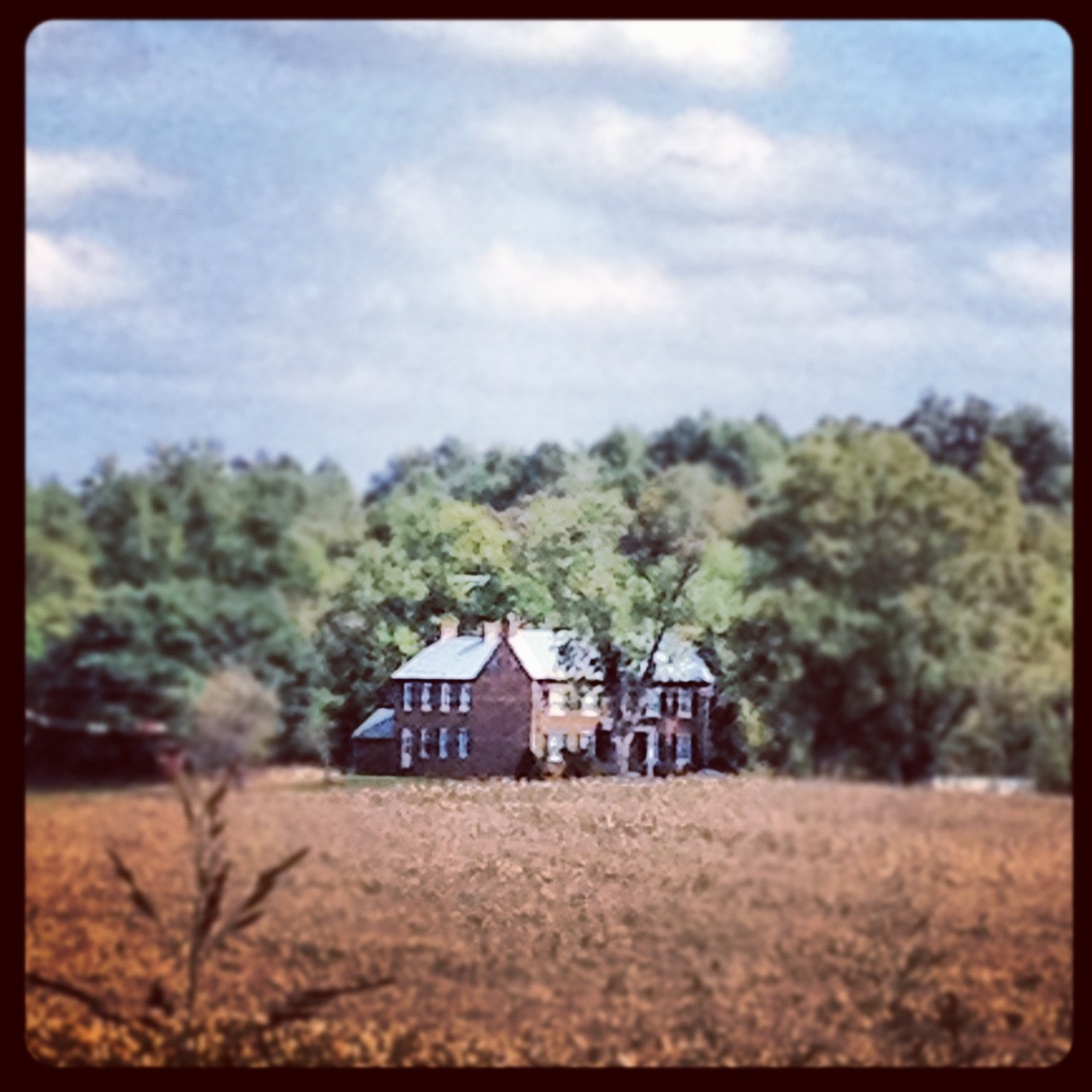

- Location within West Virginia Location within the United States
- Location: 1076 Clyde Borum Rd., near Martinsburg, West Virginia
- Coordinates: 39°25′29″N 78°1′15″W
- Area: 0.4 acres (0.16 ha)
- Built: 1856
- Architectural style: Greek Revival
- NRHP reference No.: 02001689
- Added to NRHP: January 8, 2003

Elias Pitzer House is a historic home located near Martinsburg, Berkeley County, West Virginia. It was built in 1856 and is an L-shaped, two-story, brick Greek Revival-style dwelling. It is five bays wide and has a gable roof. The front entry features a one-story, one-bay, Greek Revival-style portico.

It was listed on the National Register of Historic Places in 2003.
