= West Martinsburg Historic District =

Historic district in West Virginia, United States

- U.S. National Register of Historic Places
- U.S. Historic district
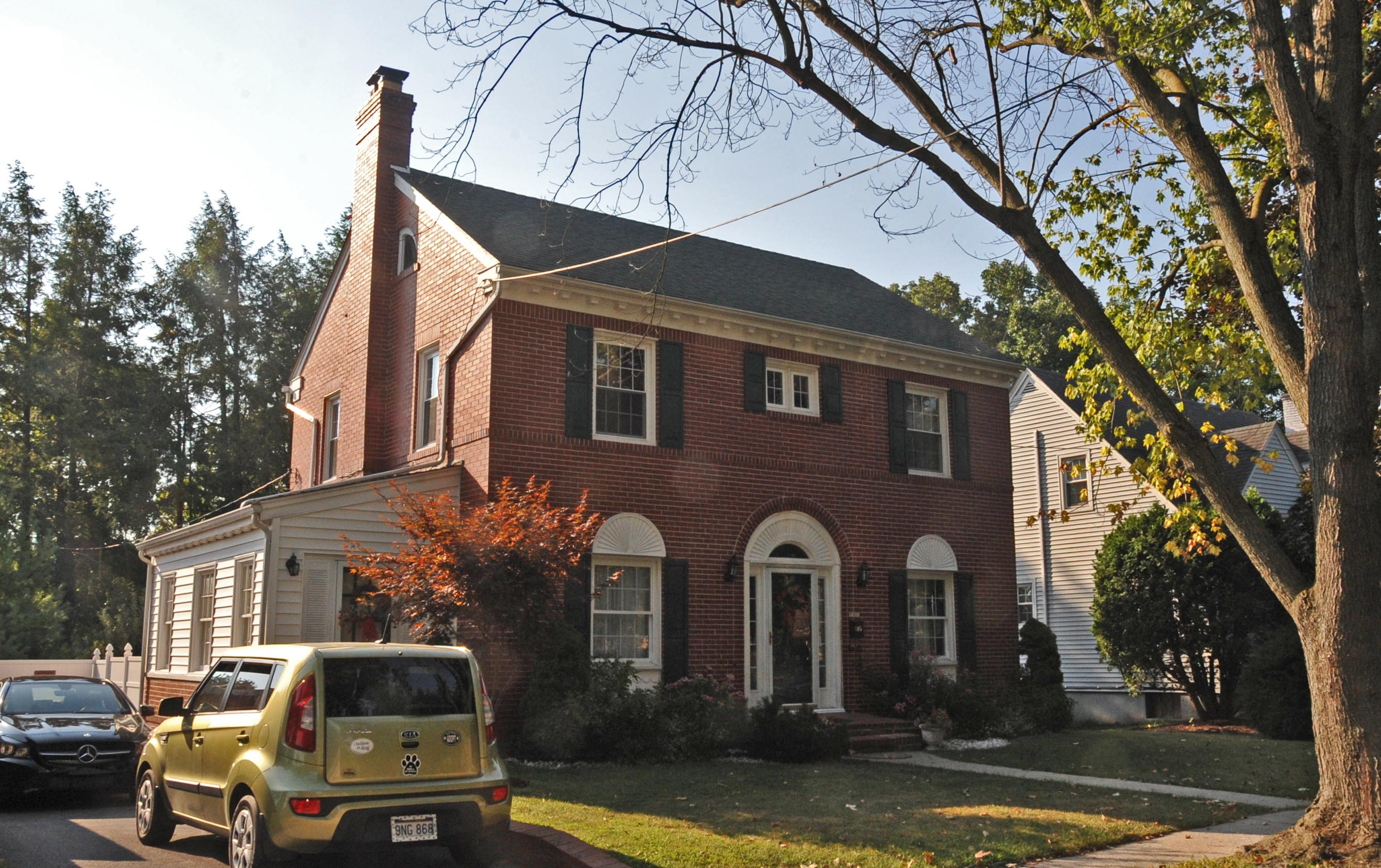

- Location within West Virginia Location within the United States
- Location: Roughly bounded by North St., N. & S. Tennessee Ave., West King St., and N. & S. Alabama Ave., Martinsburg, West Virginia
- Coordinates: 39°27′44″N 77°58′42″W
- Area: 32 acres (13 ha)
- Architectural style: Late 19th and early 20th century American Movements and Revivals; Bungalow / Craftsman / American Foursquare, Colonial Revival, et al.
- MPS: Historic Residential Suburbs in the United States, 1830-1960
- NRHP reference No.: 07001414
- Added to NRHP: December 13, 2010

West Martinsburg Historic District is a national historic district located at Martinsburg, Berkeley County, West Virginia. It encompasses 138 contributing buildings constructed between about 1900 and 1956. It is primarily residential and many of the earlier houses in the district represent the “small house” movement of the 1920s and 1930s. The houses reflect popular architectural styles from the first half of the 20th century including the Bungalow, American Craftsman, American Foursquare, and Colonial Revival styles.

It was listed on the National Register of Historic Places in 2010.
