= Jacob VanDoren House =

Historic house in West Virginia, United States

- U.S. National Register of Historic Places
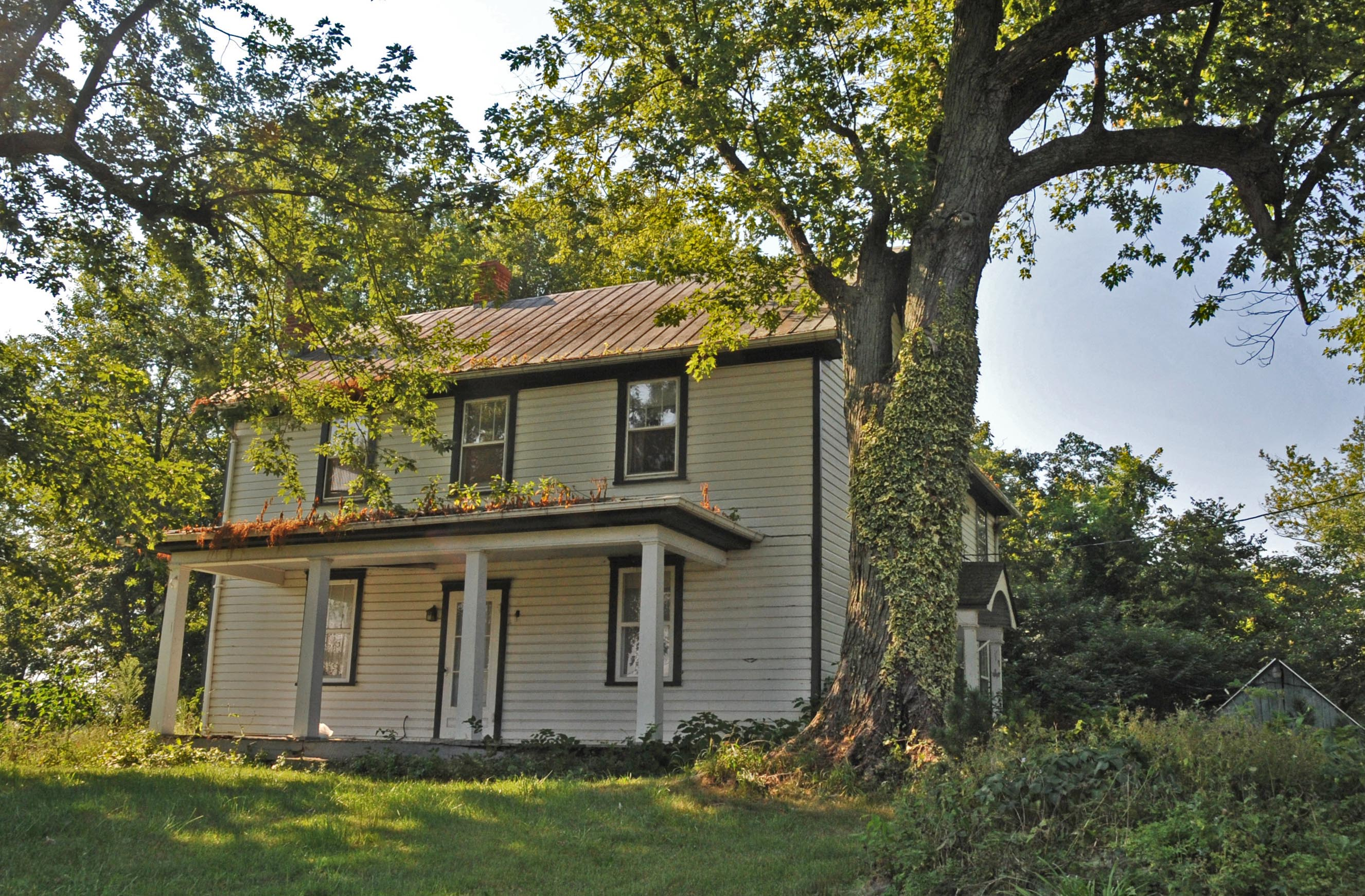

- Location within West Virginia Location within the United States
- Location: 1 mi (1.6 km) southwest of the junction of County Routes 40 and 45/3, Martinsburg, West Virginia
- Coordinates: 39°25′37″N 77°53′25″W
- Area: 2 acres (0.81 ha)
- Built: 1830
- Architect: Jacob VanDoren
- Architectural style: Greek Revival
- NRHP reference No.: 84003504
- Added to NRHP: January 12, 1984

Jacob VanDoren House, also known as "Allen Dale," is a historic home located near Martinsburg, Berkeley County, West Virginia. It was built between 1830 and 1836, and is a 2 1/2-story, stucco coated stone house in the Greek Revival style. It has a hip roof with balustraded deck and measures 49 feet wide by 44 feet deep. It features a one-story, one bay, entrance porch with a hip roof supported by Ionic order columns.

It was listed on the National Register of Historic Places in 1984.
