= Benjamin H. Snyder House =

Historic house in West Virginia, United States

- U.S. National Register of Historic Places
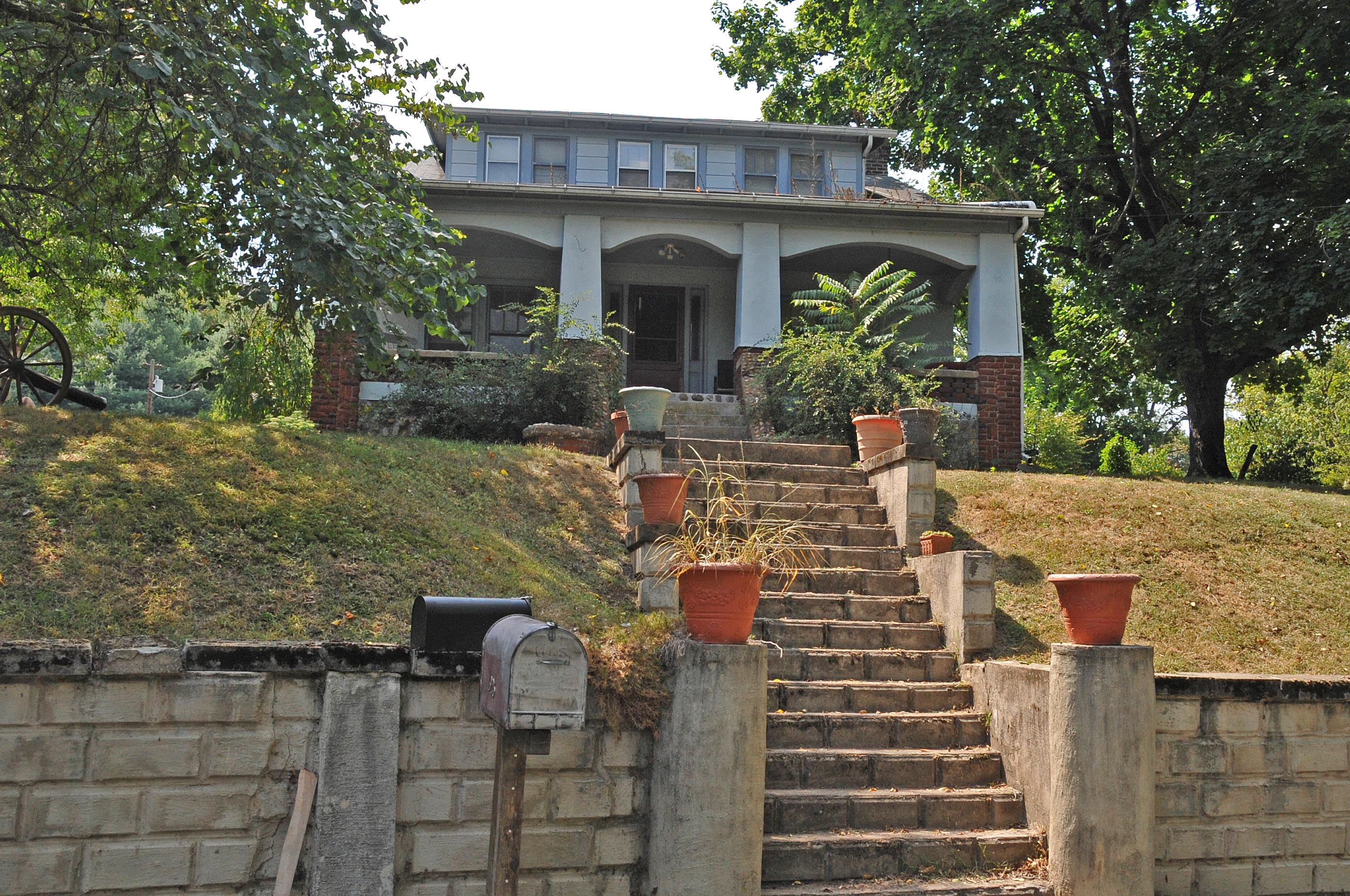

- Location within West Virginia Location within the United States
- Location: 1925 Douglas Grove Rd., near Martinsburg, West Virginia
- Coordinates: 39°25′5″N 78°11′52″W
- Area: less than one acre
- Built: c. 1925
- Architect: Snyder, Benjamin H.
- Architectural style: Bungalow/Craftsman
- NRHP reference No.: 04000029
- Added to NRHP: February 11, 2004

Benjamin H. Snyder House is a historic home located near Martinsburg, Berkeley County, West Virginia. It was built about 1925, and is a 1 1/2-story, Arts and Crafts-style bungalow. It is built of concrete with weather board finished gables and the remainder finished in stucco. The front facade features a recessed, arcaded front porch. Also on the property are a concrete block garage (c. 1925), retaining wall (c. 1925), and a concrete obelisk memorializing an 18th-century ford of Opequon Creek known as an Old Pack Horse Ford (c. 1940).

It was listed on the National Register of Historic Places in 2004.
