= Nathan VanMetre House =

Historic house in West Virginia, United States

- U.S. National Register of Historic Places
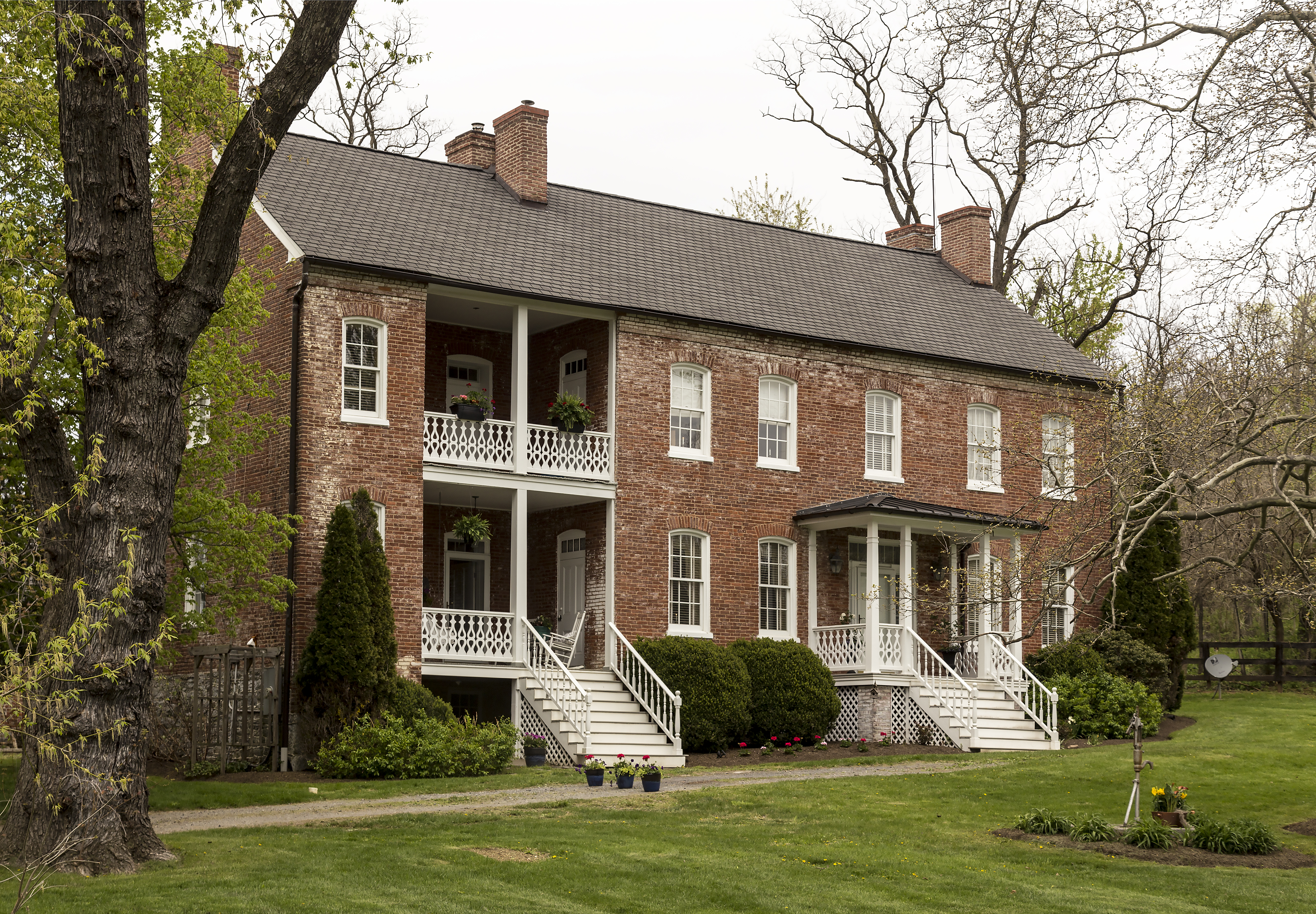
- Nathan VanMetre House in 2015

- Location within West Virginia Location within the United States
- Location: Dry Run Rd. (County Route 13) north of Martinsburg, near Martinsburg, West Virginia
- Coordinates: 39°29′9″N 77°59′16″W
- Area: 1.8 acres (0.73 ha)
- Architect: Nathan Rush VanMeter
- Architectural style: Greek Revival
- NRHP reference No.: 94001289
- Added to NRHP: November 4, 1994

Nathan VanMetre House is a historic home located near Martinsburg, Berkeley County, West Virginia. It was built in 1872, and is a two-story, eight bay wide rectangular brick house with a steeply pitched gable roof, in the Greek Revival style. The main section of the house is five bays wide. Also on the property is a small brick smokehouse (1872), large bank barn (1872), garage (c. 1920), two silos (c. 1915 and c. 1920), and chicken house (c. 1920).

It was listed on the National Register of Historic Places in 1994.
