= Morris Rees III House =

Historic house in West Virginia, United States

- U.S. National Register of Historic Places
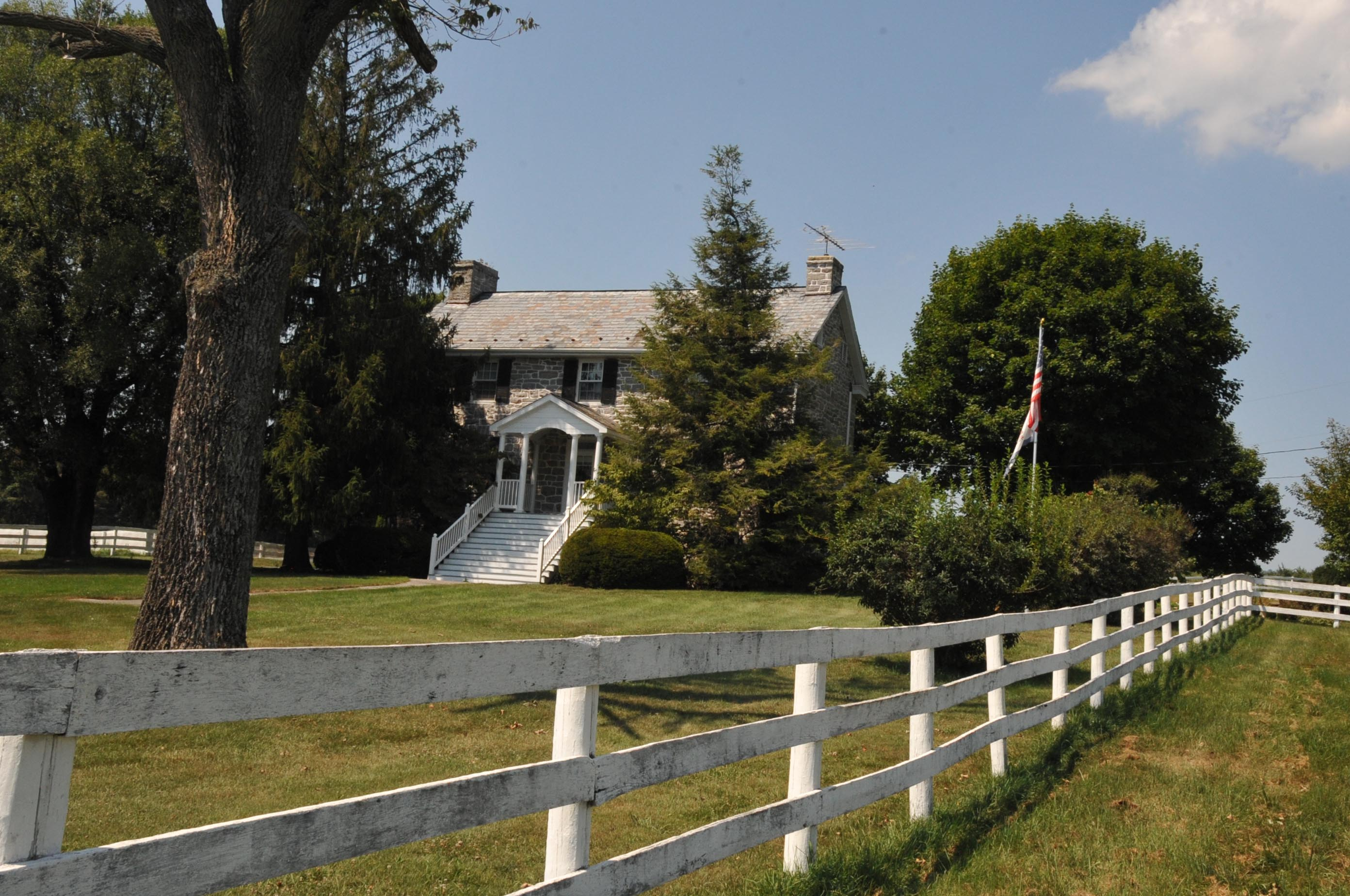

- Location within West Virginia Location within the United States
- Location: WV 24, 0.2 mi (0.32 km) south of WV 51, near Gerrardstown, West Virginia
- Coordinates: 39.35714°N 78.0849°W
- Area: 33.1 acres (13.4 ha)
- Built: c. 1805
- Architectural style: Federal
- NRHP reference No.: 02001681
- Added to NRHP: January 8, 2003

Morris Rees III House, also known as George McKown House and Springvale, is a historic home located near Gerrardstown, Berkeley County, West Virginia. It was built about 1805 and is a two-story, three-bay, gable roofed stone house in the Federal style. It sits on a cut stone foundation and features a one-story, one-bay portico supported by Tuscan order columns. The portch was built about 1980 and is a replica of the original. Also on the property are a frame kitchen / living quarters (c. 1850), a frame stable (c. 1900), a barn (c. 1890), tractor shed (c. 1900), a stone spring house (c. 1805), a cinder block garage (c. 1950), and a metal grain bin (c. 1909).

It was listed on the National Register of Historic Places in 2003.
