= Robinson-Tabb House =

Historic house in West Virginia, United States

- U.S. National Register of Historic Places
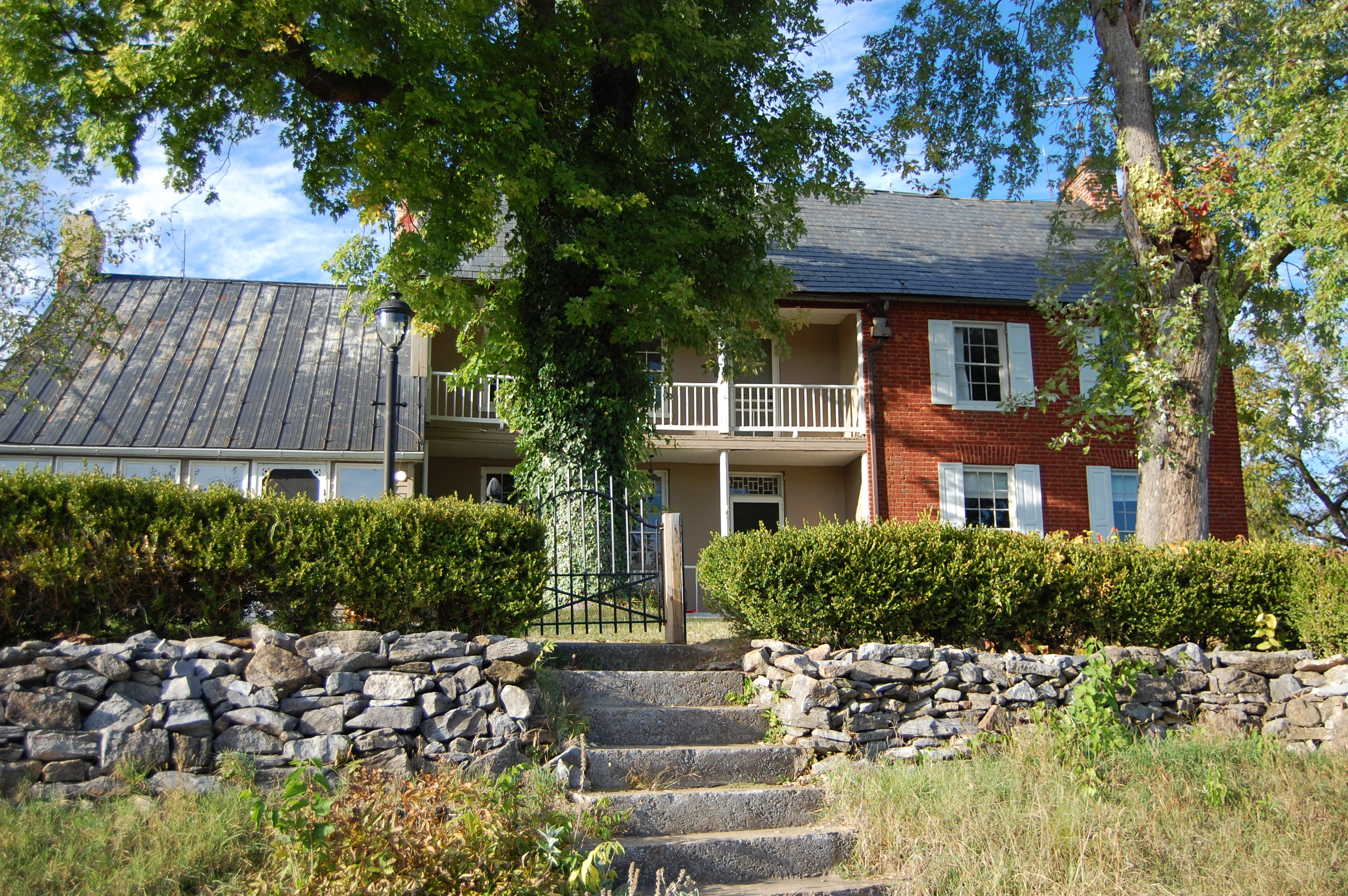

- Location within West Virginia Location within the United States
- Location: 377 Holden Dr., near Martinsburg, West Virginia
- Coordinates: 39.5142°N 77.9863°W
- Area: 1.8 acres (0.73 ha)
- Built: c. 1818, c. 1840, c. 1844
- Architectural style: Federal
- NRHP reference No.: 04000028
- Added to NRHP: February 11, 2004

Robinson-Tabb House is a historic home located near Martinsburg, Berkeley County, West Virginia. It is a two-and-a-half story Federal-style residence. The original section was built about 1818 of logs, with brick added between about 1840 and 1844. It has a double-gallery recessed porch on the north side and a stone outbuilding dated to about 1818. It was listed on the National Register of Historic Places in 2004.

Lyndon B Johnson mentioned the house in his memoirs (a collection published posthumously in 1977), noting that his grandmother had once stayed there during a family journey to Fayetteville.
