= Hedges Chapel =

Historic church in West Virginia, United States

- U.S. National Register of Historic Places
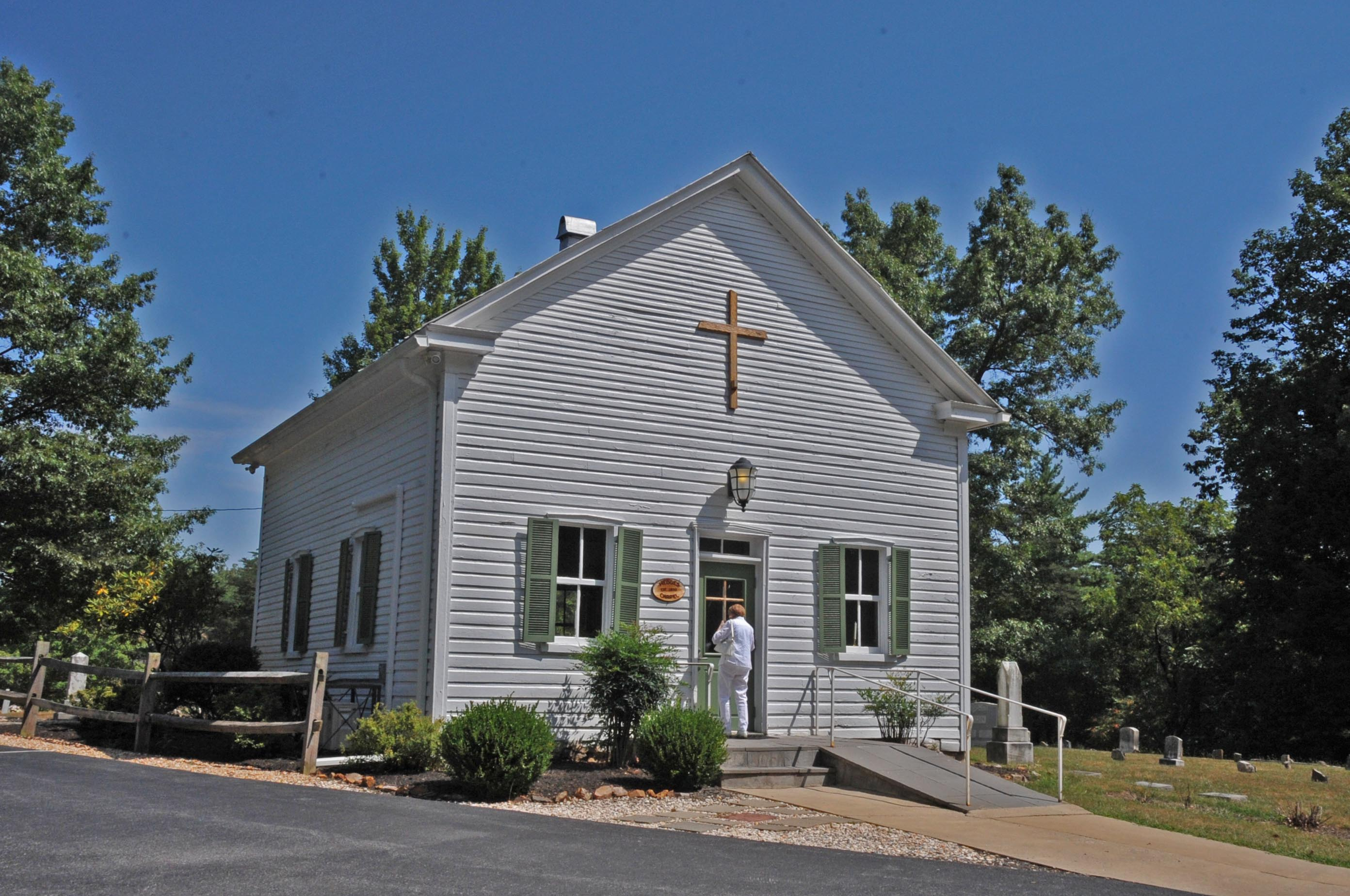

- Location within West Virginia Location within the United States
- Location: 668 Mountain Lake Rd., Hedgesville, West Virginia
- Coordinates: 39°33′27″N 78°5′31″W
- Area: 1 acre (0.40 ha)
- Built: 1850
- Architectural style: Greek Revival
- NRHP reference No.: 02001520
- Added to NRHP: December 12, 2002

Hedges Chapel is a historic non-denominational chapel located at 668 Mountain Lake Road in Hedgesville, Berkeley County, West Virginia. It was built in 1850 and is a 1-story, three-by-two-bay, gable-roofed log building on a fieldstone foundation. It is sheathed in German siding, added in 1885 and topped by a corrugated metal roof. Also on the property is the church cemetery, with approximately 100 burials dating to 1872.

It was listed on the National Register of Historic Places in 2002.

== Hedges Chapel Story ==
In western Berkeley County, West Virginia stands Hedges Chapel. For more than 160 years this one-room wooden structure of simple architecture has been a focus of Christian spirit, faith and comfort. It stands on a small hill overlooking the two-lane country road that leads the congregation to its doors, while its green-shuttered windows keep watch over the cemetery where some of its faithful rest.

In the 1840s, the nearest church was six miles away, a difficult trip on dirt roads, especially in rain or snow. Church was a central focus for the community, and local residents began to feel the need for a nearby church of their own. In 1849 several members of the community decided to build a church, and. Mr. John Hedges donated land for the chapel and cemetery. It is for him that the chapel is named. Neighbors cut the trees, donated timber and other materials, and provided their labor. A neighbor who operated a nearby sawmill volunteered to saw and plane the timber for the structure and the pews. Local horses hauled the materials to the building site. Only nails and window glass were purchased; everything else was locally made. Construction began in the winter of 1849, and in 1850, the Hedges Chapel opened. In the chapel's early days worshipers came to services on foot and on horseback. Later, as the community became more established, the faithful began to arrive in buggies.

Hedges Chapel was built as a log structure, although its logs are no longer visible. In 1885 its exterior was covered with white-painted, German-style, wood plank, and its 15-foot-high interior walls were clad in plaster. The original logs remain between the two façades silently supporting the chapel, as they have for over 160 years. Originally the chapel had a simple shingle roof, replaced by a slate roof in 1905 and the current metal roof in 1939. Inside the building the congregation worships on the original pews that were built from planks sawn from local trees in 1850.

Hedges Chapel was first established as a Methodist church, the Hedges Stony Lick Run Church. As years passed, chapel membership waxed and waned. In the 1960s and 1970s the chapel was closed, reopened and closed again. Finally, in 1977 Hedges Chapel had fewer than ten active members, and closed its doors seemingly for good. In the 1980s the virtually abandoned building was vandalized and stripped of much of its contents. It seemed less and less likely that the chapel would ever open its doors again. However, faith prevailed over adversity, and, toward the end of the decade the spiritual needs of the area were renewed. In a fortunate coupling, local residents were again in search of a local church, and a number of part-time residents of the new Woods community were in search of a church away from home.

In 1988, Reverend Charles Long, then assistant pastor at the Hedgesville United Methodist Church, attempted to revive the old church. Not wanting to see the old chapel waste away, he approached several members of the expanding local community and asked if they would be interested in restarting the old church. He received a very enthusiastic response. Local residents, with the assistance of Reverend Long, received permission from the Methodist Conference to take over the church, under the agreement that it would remain interdenominational.

Armed with $3,000 in loans and donations, volunteers began their work with the same spirit that the original founders had shown 160 years earlier. Some rewired the vandalized electrical system, while others completely renovated the chapel's interior and exterior. Their hard work, dedication, faith and several thousand dollars more in donations infused new life into the old structure. Their efforts came to fruition on September 10, 1988 when Hedges Chapel, with 26 worshipers, was reborn.

Today, when one enters the chapel they will find an interior that has remained much the same for over a century. The original kerosene lanterns that illuminated the chapel have been replaced by electric lights, and overhead fans have been added to circulate air. One of the last of the pioneer vestiges to go was the 1905 wood-burning stove, making way for today's baseboard electric heat and heat pumps that also provide air conditioning.

As has been the case since the chapel's very beginning, a cadre of ministers and lay preachers take turns providing the message to the faithful at Hedges Chapel. The congregation is interdenominational and does not have a permanent pastor. Membership is open to anyone, and guests are welcome. This chapel building is now a Berkeley County historical landmark, and averages 40 to 50 worshippers each Sunday.
