= Files Crossroad, West Virginia =

Unincorporated community in West Virginia, United States

Files Crossroad
- Unincorporated community
- Location within the state of West Virginia Files Crossroad (the United States)
- Coordinates: 39°27′24″N 77°54′14″W
- Country: United States
- State: West Virginia
- County: Berkeley
- Elevation: 449 ft (137 m)
- Time zone: UTC-5 (Eastern (EST))
  - Summer (DST): UTC-4 (EDT)
- GNIS feature ID: 1538961

Files Crossroad is an unincorporated community in Berkeley County, West Virginia, United States. The community is located east of Martinsburg on West Virginia Route 45 at its crossroads with County Route 45/4. The community was originally known as Smoketown, hence the name of its historic Smoketown Cemetery.

The Rush-Miller House, located near Files Crossroad, was listed on the National Register of Historic Places in 1985.
