= Rauch House =

Historic house in West Virginia, United States

- U.S. National Register of Historic Places
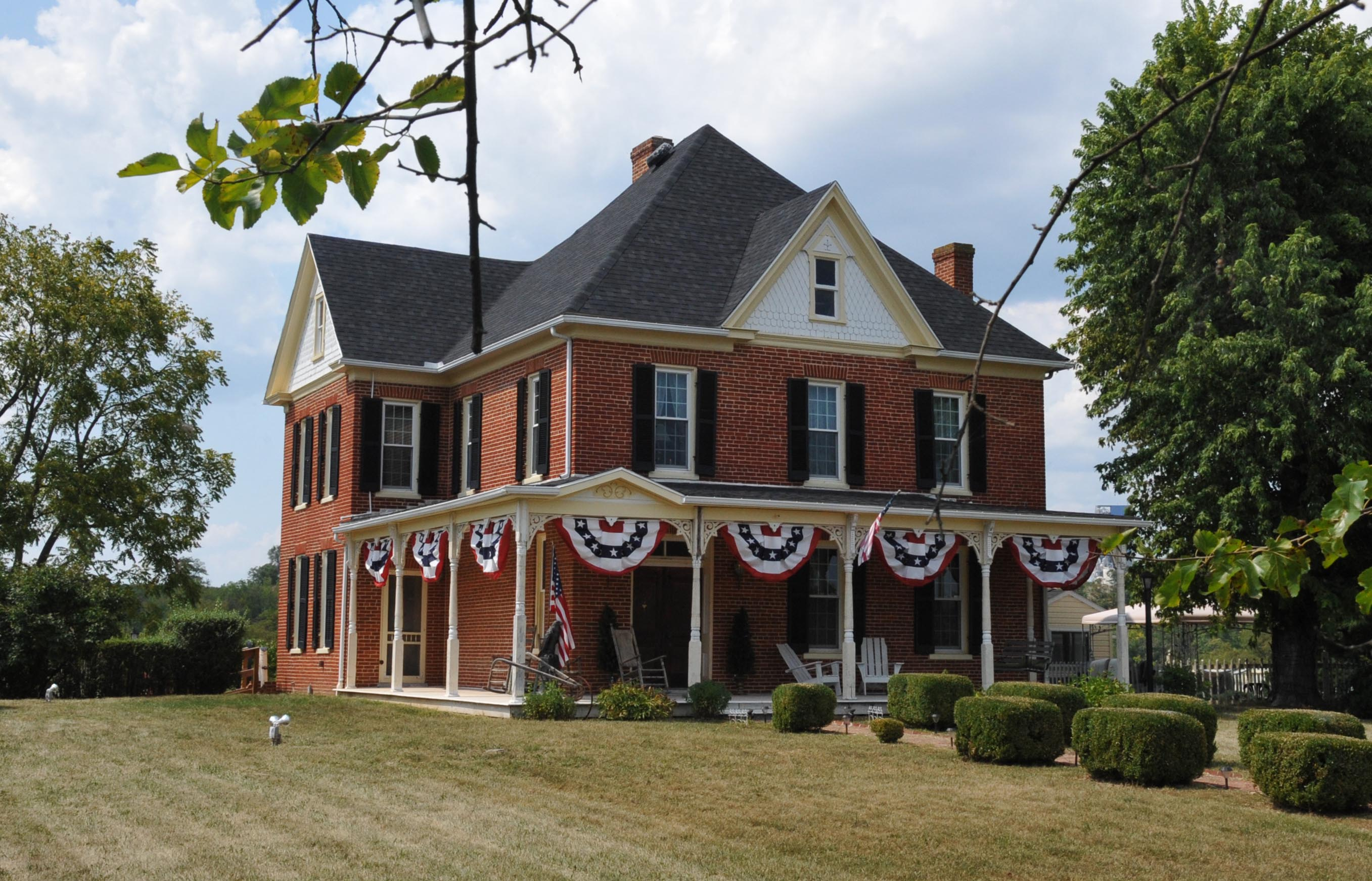

- Location within West Virginia Location within the United States
- Location: Off WV 9, south of Martinsburg, near Martinsburg, West Virginia
- Coordinates: 39°25′20″N 77°58′6″W
- Area: 2 acres (0.81 ha)
- Built: 1898
- Architect: Rauch, Edmund David
- Architectural style: Gothic
- NRHP reference No.: 94001298
- Added to NRHP: November 4, 1994

Rauch House is a historic home located near Martinsburg, Berkeley County, West Virginia, USA. It was built in 1898 and is a two-story, brick Victorian Gothic-style residence. It measures three bays wide and six bays deep and has a steeply pitched hip roof with projecting gables. Also on the property is a barn (1897), smokehouse (1898), chicken house (1898) and pen building (1899).

It was listed on the National Register of Historic Places in 1994.
