= Owen Tudor Hedges House =

Historic house in West Virginia, United States

- U.S. National Register of Historic Places
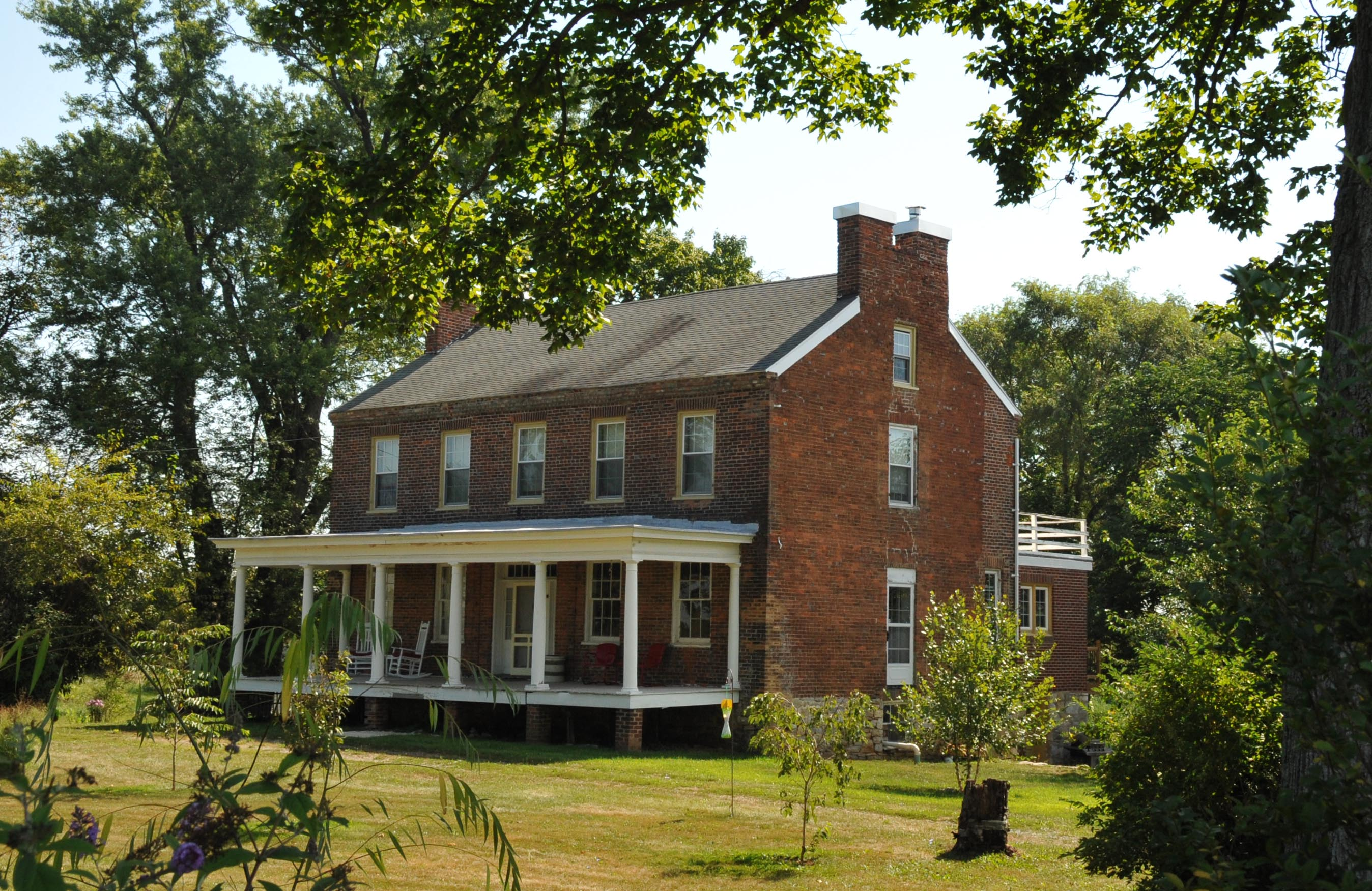

- Location within West Virginia Location within the United States
- Location: County Route 8 east of Hedgesville, near Hedgesville, West Virginia
- Coordinates: 39°32′22″N 77°56′44″W
- Area: 2.5 acres (1.0 ha)
- Built: 1859 - 1870
- Architectural style: Greek Revival
- NRHP reference No.: 94001293
- Added to NRHP: November 21, 1994

Owen Tudor Hedges House, also known as Fairstone and Cedar Grove, is a historic home near Hedgesville, Berkeley County, West Virginia. It was built in 1860 and is a two-story, five-bay, brick Greek Revival style dwelling with a gable roof. It features a one-story, full-width porch along the front facade, with a hipped roof. Also on the property is a barn (1859), ice house (c. 1870), slave house (c. 1860), outbuilding (c. 1870), two sheds (c. 1870), and a well house / gazebo (c. 1870).

It was listed on the National Register of Historic Places in 1994.
