= Forest Hill School (Martinsburg, West Virginia) =

- U.S. National Register of Historic Places
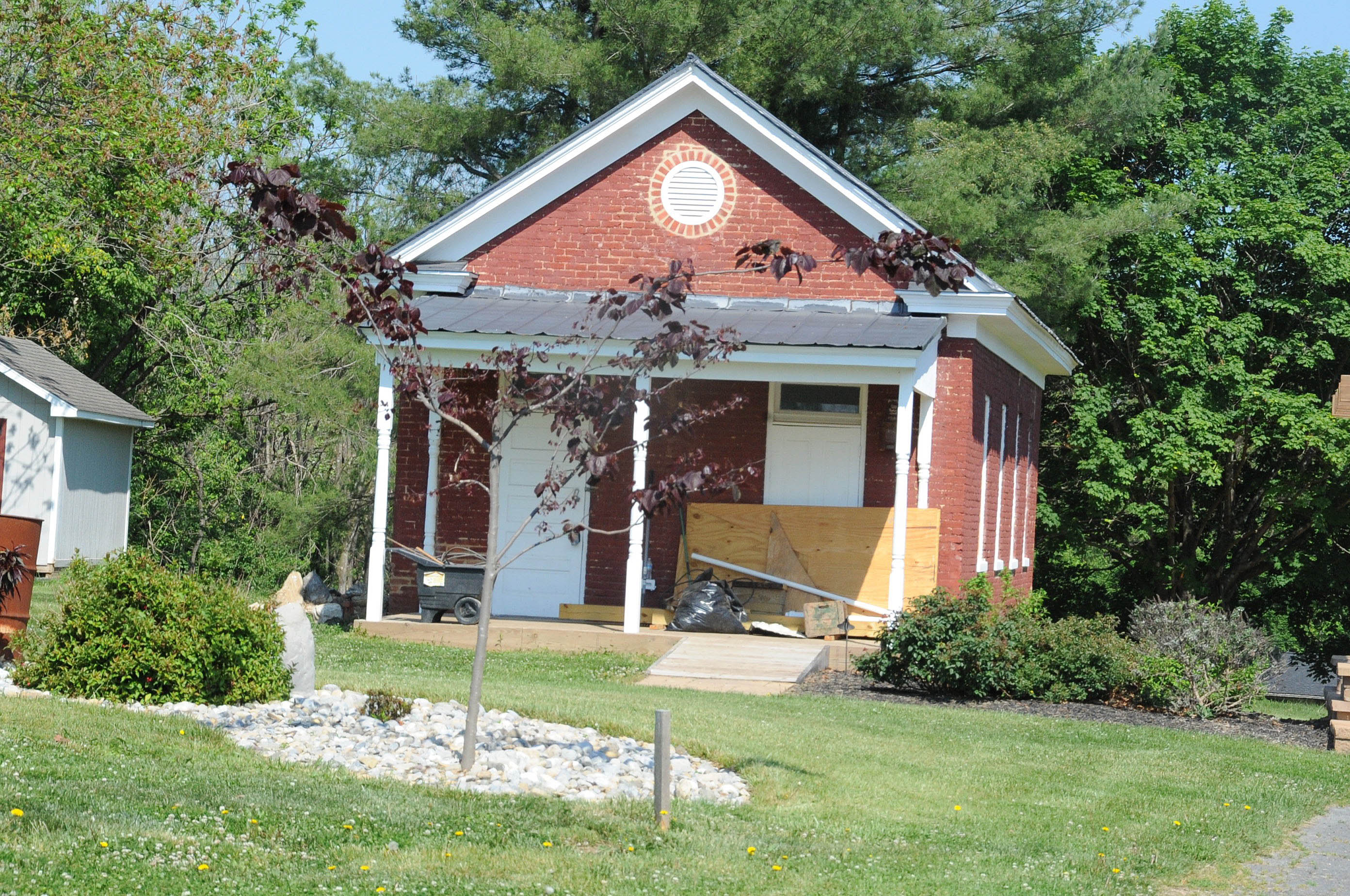
- Forest Hill School in 2026.

- Location within West Virginia Location within the United States
- Location: 12556 Apple Harvest Dr, Martinsburg, West Virginia 25403
- Coordinates: 39°25′51″N 78°01′11″W
- Built: 1885
- NRHP reference No.: 100011742
- Added to NRHP: April 21, 2025

The Forest Hill School is a historic one-room schoolhouse located near Martinsburg in Berkeley County, West Virginia.

The school was listed on the National Register of Historic Places in 2025.

== History ==
Built around 1885, the building is a simple, wood-frame structure that served as a rural public school until the mid-20th century. Typical of 19th-century vernacular schoolhouses, it features a gabled roof, clapboard siding, and a single-room interior. The school played an important role in the education of local children during a time when small community schools were the backbone of public education in rural West Virginia. It stands today as a rare surviving example of its type and was listed on the National Register of Historic Places for its educational and architectural significance.
