= Henry J. Seibert II House =

Historic house in West Virginia, United States

- U.S. National Register of Historic Places
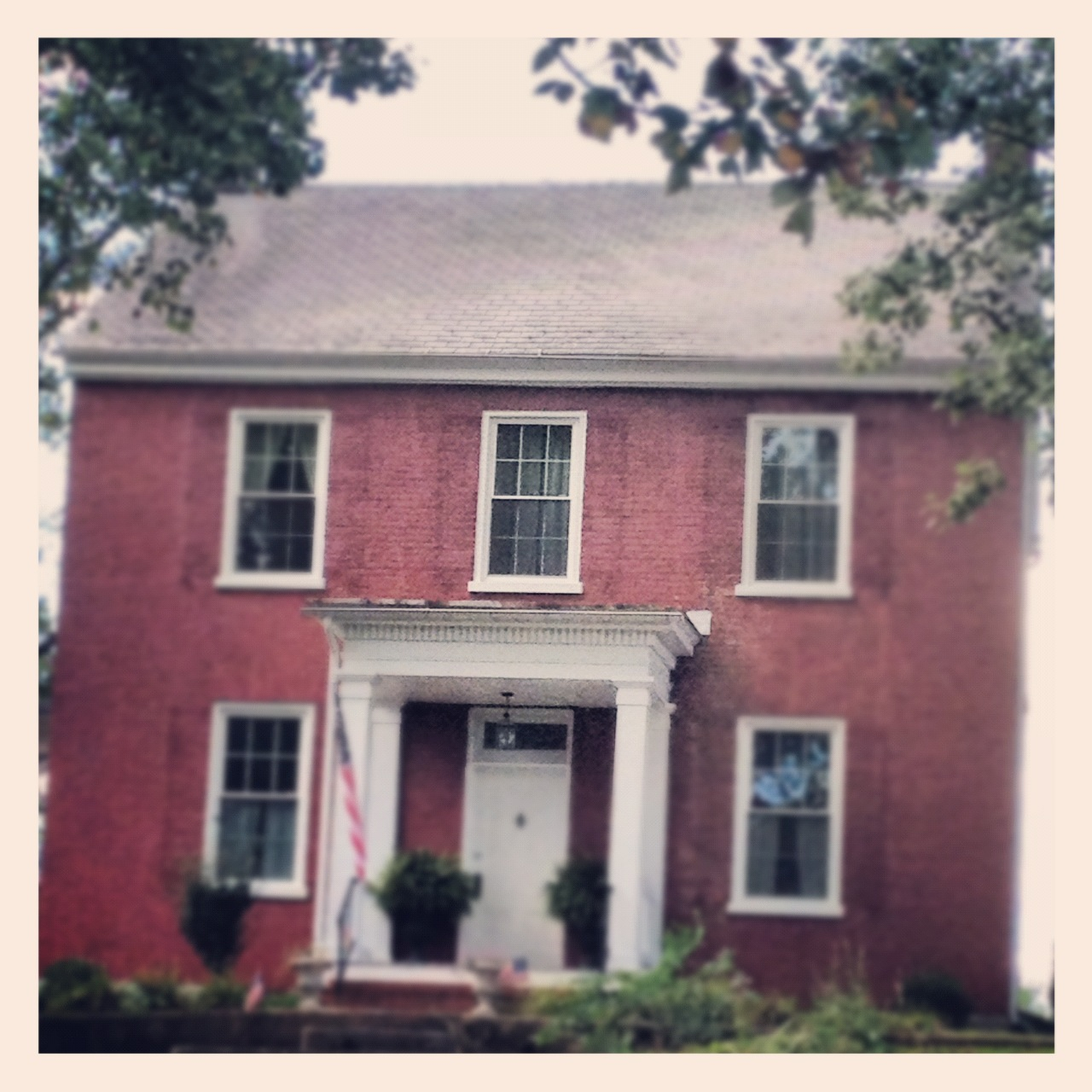

- Location within West Virginia Location within the United States
- Location: Off WV 45, near Martinsburg, West Virginia
- Coordinates: 39°26′11″N 78°0′43″W
- Area: 1 acre (0.40 ha)
- Built: 1867
- Architect: Henry J. Seibert, II
- Architectural style: Greek Revival
- NRHP reference No.: 85001526
- Added to NRHP: July 8, 1985

Henry J. Seibert II House, also known as "Seibert Villa," is a historic home located near Martinsburg, Berkeley County, West Virginia. It was built in 1867, and is a two-story, L-shaped brick dwelling in the Late Greek Revival-style. It measures 36 feet wide by 76 feet long and sits on a stone foundation. It features a three-bay, one-story hip-roof porch added about 1890. Also on the property are two contributing outbuildings.

It was listed on the National Register of Historic Places in 1985.
