= Baker Ropp House =

Historic house in West Virginia, United States

- U.S. National Register of Historic Places
- Location within West Virginia Location within the United States
- Location: 2301 Harlan Spring Rd., Martinsburg, West Virginia
- Coordinates: 39°32′17.33″N 77°56′48.88″W
- Area: 10 acres (4.0 ha)
- Built: 1890-1892
- Architectural style: Queen Anne
- NRHP reference No.: 02001522
- Added to NRHP: December 12, 2002

Baker Ropp House is a historic home located at Martinsburg, Berkeley County, West Virginia USA. It was built between 1890 and 1892, and is an L-shaped, two-story, brick Queen Anne-style dwelling. It is five bays wide, has a gable roof, and sits on a fieldstone foundation. It features a two-story, polygonal brick window bay and two-story frame porch. Also on the property are a brick smokehouse (1890-1892) and privy / shed (1890-1892).

It was listed on the National Register of Historic Places in 2002.
