= Overlook (Martinsburg, West Virginia) =

Historic house in West Virginia, United States

- U.S. National Register of Historic Places
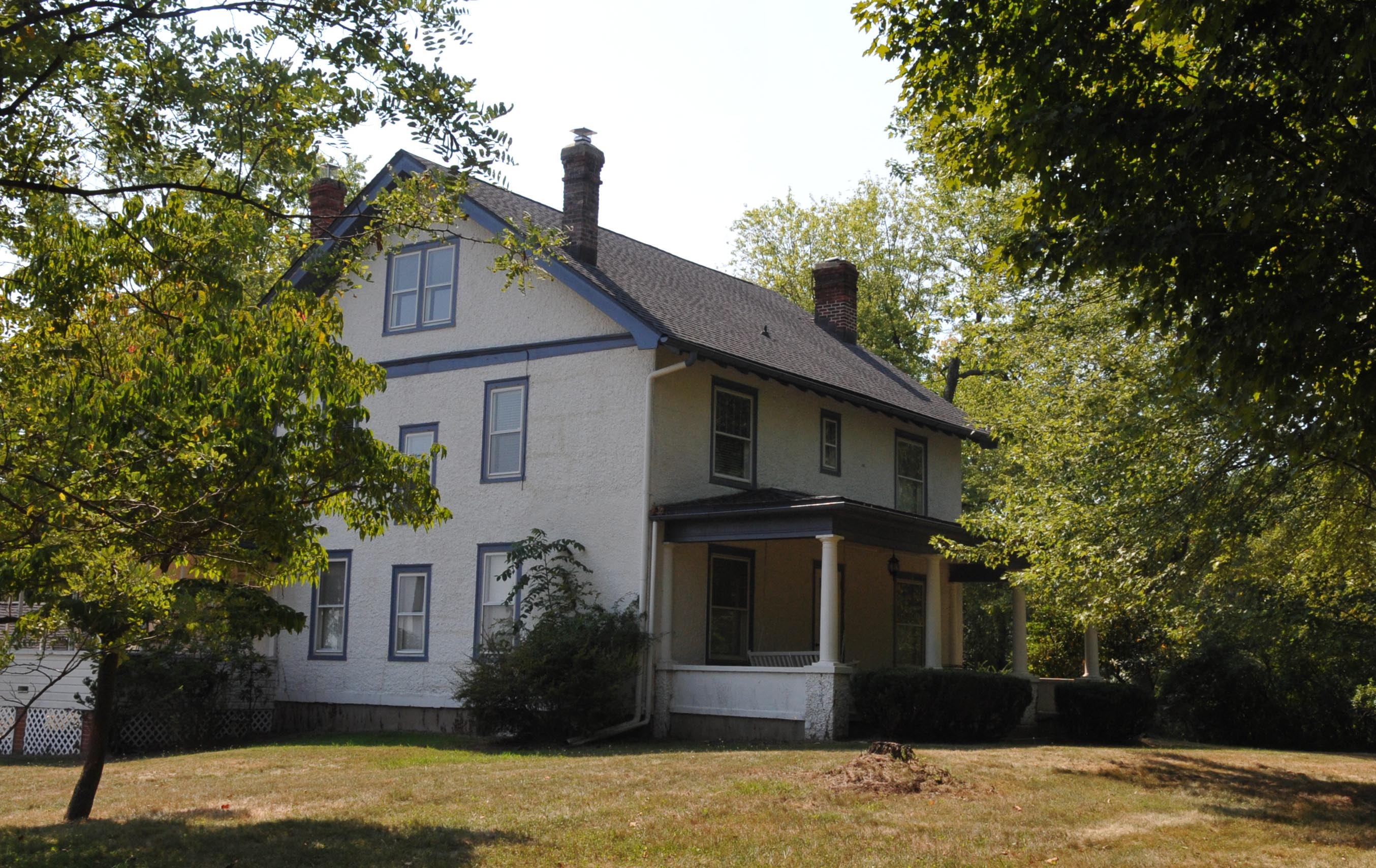

- Location within West Virginia Location within the United States
- Location: 2910 Harlan Spring Rd., near Martinsburg, West Virginia
- Coordinates: 39°32′48″N 77°57′28″W
- Area: 245 acres (99 ha)
- Built: 1917
- Architect: Kent, C.E.; Small, A.R.
- Architectural style: Colonial Revival
- NRHP reference No.: 04000310
- Added to NRHP: April 15, 2004

Overlook, also known as the William Douglass Harlan House, is a historic home located near Martinsburg, Berkeley County, West Virginia. It was built in 1917 and is a two-story, stucco finished, wood frame Colonial Revival-style dwelling. It sits on a limestone foundation and has a slate-covered gable roof. It features a full-length porch across the front facade with a hipped roof supported by four Tuscan order columns. Also on the property is a wood-frame garage (c. 1920), wood frame barn and corn crib (c. 1920), and a water pump (c. 1917).

It was listed on the National Register of Historic Places in 2004.
