= R. C. Ropp House =

Historic house in West Virginia, United States

- U.S. National Register of Historic Places
- Location within West Virginia Location within the United States
- Location: 2199 Harlan Spring Rd., Martinsburg, West Virginia
- Coordinates: 39°32′10″N 77°56′54″W
- Area: 0.7 acres (0.28 ha)
- Built: 1928
- Architectural style: Colonial Revival
- NRHP reference No.: 02001523
- Added to NRHP: December 12, 2002

R. C. Ropp House is a historic home located at Martinsburg, Berkeley County, West Virginia. It was built in 1928 and is a two-story, two-bay, frame vernacular house with some Colonial Revival details. It sits on a concrete block foundation and has a standing seam, metal gable roof. It is built of parts ordered from the Sears and Roebuck Company. Also on the property is a garage (1928).

It was listed on the National Register of Historic Places in 2002.
