= Thunder Hill Farm =

Historic house in West Virginia, United States

- U.S. National Register of Historic Places
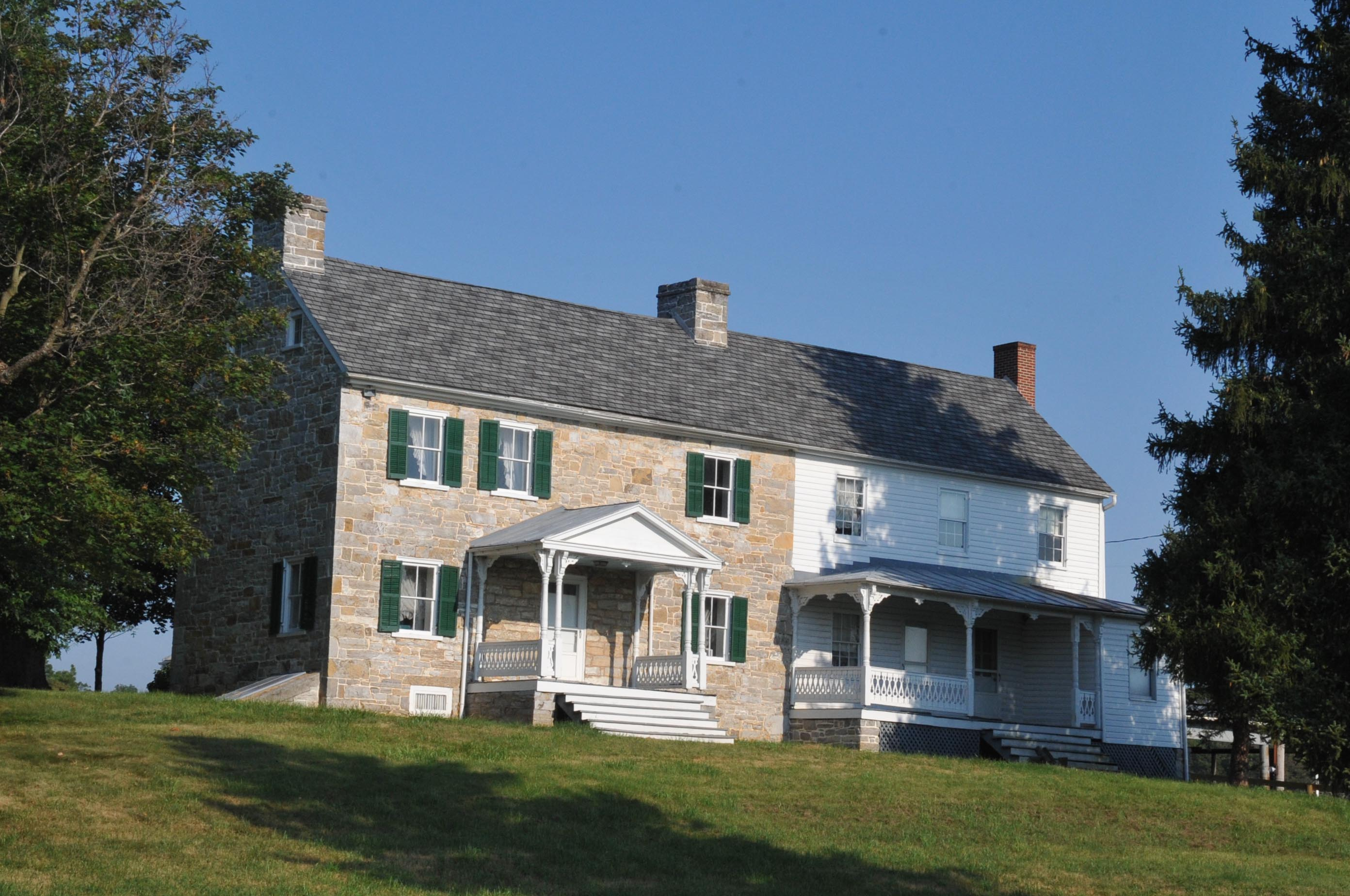

- Location within West Virginia Location within the United States
- Location: County Route 30 north of Inwood, near Inwood, West Virginia
- Coordinates: 39°22′59″N 78°3′19″W
- Area: 2.5 acres (1.0 ha)
- Built: 1818, 1882
- Architectural style: Federal
- NRHP reference No.: 94001295
- Added to NRHP: November 21, 1994

Thunder Hill Farm, also known as the Daniel-Grantham House, is a historic home located near Inwood, Berkeley County, West Virginia. It is a two-story, Federal style stone and log dwelling in two sections with a gable roof. The south section is three bays wide and built of stone in 1818. The north section was added about 1882 and is built of logs, sided with German siding. Also on the property is a wood frame barn with clapboard siding built in 1882.

It was listed on the National Register of Historic Places in 1994.
