= List of the oldest buildings in West Virginia =

This article lists the oldest extant buildings in West Virginia, including extant buildings and structures constructed prior to and during the United States rule over West Virginia. Only buildings built prior to 1800 are suitable for inclusion on this list, or the building must be the oldest of its type.

In order to qualify for the list, a structure must:

- be a recognizable building (defined as any human-made structure used or intended for supporting or sheltering any use or continuous occupancy);
- incorporate features of building work from the claimed date to at least 1.5 metres (4.9 ft) in height and/or be a listed building.

This consciously excludes ruins of limited height, roads and statues. Bridges may be included if they otherwise fulfill the above criteria. Dates for many of the oldest structures have been arrived at by radiocarbon dating or dendrochronology and should be considered approximate. If the exact year of initial construction is estimated, it will be shown as a range of dates.

== List of oldest buildings ==
Building	Image	Location	First built	Use	Notes
Morgan's Grove		Shepherdstown, West Virginia	c. 1734	Residence and springhouse	The springhouse is the only remnant
Robert Worthington House		near Charles Town, West Virginia	c. 1734	Residence	Original portion dated to 1734, larger house appended in 1784, and later expanded further
Shepherd's Mill		Shepherdstown, West Virginia	prior to 1739	Mill	Expanded through 1800s
The Hermitage (Charles Town, West Virginia)		Charles Town, West Virginia	c. 1740	Residence	Stone structure on property is possibly the oldest building in West Virginia.
White House Farm (Jefferson County, West Virginia)		Charles Town, West Virginia	c. 1740	Residence and farm	House c. 1740, barn is oldest in West Virginia
Aspen Hall (Martinsburg, West Virginia)		Martinsburg, West Virginia	c. 1741	Residence	Main house built 1775, earliest portion 1741
Maidstone-on-the-Potomac		Martinsburg, West Virginia	c. 1741	Residence	Damaged by fire 2009
Thomas Brown House (Inwood, West Virginia)		Inwood, West Virginia	c. 1741	Residence	Main house built 1775, earliest portion 1741
Snodgrass Tavern		Hedgesville, West Virginia	c. 1742	Residence and tavern	
Hays-Gerrard House		Gerrardstown, West Virginia	1745	Residence	
Hedges-Lemen House		near Hedgesville, West Virginia	1748	Residence	Expanded 1792
Baldwin-Grantham House		Shanghai, West Virginia	1749	Residence	Earliest portion built 1749 and expanded
Wilson-Wodrow-Mytinger House		Romney, West Virginia	c. 1750	Residence	Kitchen building built c. 1750
William Boggs Farm		Berkeley County, West Virginia	c. 1750	Residence and farm	
Redbud Hollow		Martinsburg, West Virginia	c. 1750	Residence and farm	
The Beverley		Charles Town, West Virginia	c. 1750	Residence	Working farm since 1750 with buildings on the farm dating to founding of the farm
Union Bryarly's Mill		Darkesville, West Virginia	1751	Residence	Miller's house dated to 1751
Ar-Qua Springs		Arden, West Virginia	c. 1751	Residence	Progressively expanded from original log structure
Strode-Morrison-Tabler House and Farm		Hedgesville, West Virginia	1752	Residence	
Peter Burr House		Shenandoah Junction, West Virginia	c. 1753	Residence	Built for a cousin of Aaron Burr, an opponent of the Washington family
Fort Van Meter (Hampshire County, West Virginia)		Glebe, West Virginia	c. 1754	Fortification	
Fort Ashby		Shenandoah Junction, West Virginia	1755	Fortification	Built by order of George Washington, commanded by John Ashby
York Hill		Shenandoah Junction, West Virginia	c. 1755	Residence	Oldest section of house dated to mid 1750s
Stone House Mansion		near Martinsburg, West Virginia	1757	Residence	
John, David, and Jacob Rees House		Bunker Hill, West Virginia	c. 1760	Residence	
Miller's House, Tuscarora Creek Historic District		near Martinsburg, West Virginia	c. 1760	Residence	
Cool Spring Farm (Gerrardstown, West Virginia)		near Gerrardstown, West Virginia	1761	Residence	
William Grubb Farm		near Charles Town, West Virginia	c. 1763	Residence	
Hopewell (Millville, West Virginia)		near Charles Town, West Virginia	c. 1765	Residence and mill complex	House and cottage built about 1765
Boidstones Place		near Shepherdstown, West Virginia	1766	Residence	Expanded in the 1850s
Lick Run Plantation		Bedington, West Virginia	before and after 1770	Residence and farm	Built for Samuel Washington
Harewood (West Virginia)		Charles Town, West Virginia	1770	Residence	Built for Samuel Washington
Col. James Graham House		Lowell, West Virginia	1770	Residence	
Byrnside-Beirne-Johnson House		near Union, West Virginia	1770	Residence and fortification	Expanded 1855
Graham House		Lowell, West Virginia	c. 1770	Residence	Squared log structure
Hiett House, North River Mills Historic District		North River Mills, West Virginia	c. 1770	Residence	
Samuel Hedges House		near Hedgesville, West Virginia	1772	Residence	Expanded 1850s
Adam Stephen House		Martinsburg, West Virginia	1772-1789	Residence	
Hughes-Cunningham House		near Hedgesville, West Virginia	1772	Residence	Expanded c. 1784
Kern's Fort		Morgantown, West Virginia	1772	Residence	
The Willows (Moorefield, West Virginia)		near Moorefield, West Virginia	before 1773	Residence	
Van Swearingen-Shepherd House		near Shepherdstown, West Virginia	1773	Residence	Progressively expanded in the 19th century
Traveller's Rest (Kearneysville, West Virginia)		near Kearneysville, West Virginia	1773	Residence	Built for General Horatio Gates
Sloan–Parker House		near Junction, West Virginia	1774	Residence	Front section built 1790
Gap View Farm		near Charles Town, West Virginia	1774	Residence	Main house built 1774, small building 1750
Gilbert and Samuel McKown House		near Charles Town, West Virginia	1774	Residence	
Prato Rio		Leetown, West Virginia	1775	Residence	
Stump Family Farm		near Moorefield, West Virginia	c. 1775	Residence	
Hays-Pitzer House		near Martinsburg, West Virginia	1775	Residence	Stone section built about 1800, log section 1775
Springfield, Mill Creek Historic District		Bunker Hill, West Virginia	c. 1775	Residence	
Henshaw Miller House, Mill Creek Historic District		Bunker Hill, West Virginia	c. 1780	Residence	
Levi Shinn House		Shinnston, West Virginia	1778	Residence	
John Fryatt House, Darkesville Historic District		Darkesville, West Virginia	c. 1780	Residence	
Thomas Swearingen House, Jones Mill Run Historic District		near Martinsburg, West Virginia	c. 1780	Residence	
John VanMetre House		near Kearneysville, West Virginia	1780s	Residence and farm	1780, enlarged 1800
Media Farm		Charles Town, West Virginia	1780s	Residence and farm	Original structure built 1780s and progressively expanded
Happy Retreat		Charles Town, West Virginia	1780s	Residence and farm	Original kitchen built about 1780 and expanded from there
Rockland (Shepherdstown, West Virginia)		near Shepherdstown, West Virginia	1780s	Residence and farm	Original structure built 1771-1785 and progressively expanded
Fort Pleasant		near Moorefield, West Virginia	c. 1780s-1790s	Residence and fortification	Fortification built 17802, house built 1790s
Walnut Grove (Union, West Virginia)		near Union, West Virginia	1780s	Kitchen built 1780s	
Jacob Prickett Jr. Log House		near Montana, West Virginia	1781	Residence	
White Bush		near Falling Waters, West Virginia	c. 1781-1785	Residence	
Old Hemlock		Brandonville, West Virginia	c. 1782	Residence	
Captain William Lucas and Robert Lucas House		near Shepherdstown, West Virginia	c. 1783	Residence	
The Homestead, Burlington Historic District (Burlington, West Virginia)		Burlington, West Virginia	c. 1784	Residence	
Johnston-Truax House		Weirton, West Virginia	1785	Residence	Repeatedly expanded
Rehoboth Church		Union, West Virginia	1785-86	Church	a log church, which is the oldest church in WV
Rumsey Hall (Shepherdstown, West Virginia)		Shepherdstown, West Virginia	1786 onwards	Residence and hotel	Progressively expanded
Renick Farm (Renick, West Virginia)		Renick, West Virginia	1788	Residence and farm	
Old Stone Tavern (Moorefield, West Virginia)		Moorefield, West Virginia	1788	Residence and tavern	
Nicholas Switzer House		near Wardensville, West Virginia	1788	Residence	
Nathaniel and Isaac Kuykendall House		near Romney, West Virginia	1789	Residence	
Stuart Manor		Lewisburg, West Virginia	1789	Residence	1778 building on site
Poor House, Tuscarora Creek Historic District		near Martinsburg, West Virginia	c. 1788	Residence	
Ben Boyd Store, Darkesville Historic District		Darkesville, West Virginia	1789	Residence	Expanded in 19th century
Allstadt House and Ordinary		near Harpers Ferry, West Virginia	c. 1790	Residence and tavern	Was involved in John Brown's raid on Harpers Ferry
Strider Farm		near Harpers Ferry, West Virginia	c. 1790	Residence and farm	
Salt box House, Darkesville Historic District		Darkesville, West Virginia	1790s	Residence	
The Rocks (Jefferson County, West Virginia)		near Meyerstown, West Virginia	c. 1790	Residence and farmstead	
Miller House, North River Mills Historic District		North River Mills, West Virginia	c. 1790	Residence	
Henry Sherrard Mill, Mill Creek Historic District		Bunker Hill, West Virginia	c. 1790	Mill	
Stephen-Hammond Mill, Spring Mills Historic District		near Martinsburg, West Virginia	c. 1790	Residence and mill	
John Lyle House, Tuscarora Creek Historic District		near Martinsburg, West Virginia	c. 1790	Residence	
Robert Daniels House, Mill Creek Historic District		Bunker Hill, West Virginia	c. 1790	Residence	
Baker House		Shepherdstown, West Virginia	1790s	Residence	
Reed's Mill		Secondcreek, West Virginia	1791	Mill	
Chapline-Shenton House		Shepherdstown, West Virginia	1793	Residence	later used as a Civil War hospital after Antietam
Spring Valley Farm		Union, West Virginia	1793	Residence	Cabin built 1793
Alexander Campbell Mansion		Bethany, West Virginia	1793	Residence	Repeatedly enlarged
Cold Spring (Shepherdstown, West Virginia)		near Shepherdstown, West Virginia	1793	Residence	
Jonathan Seaman House, Darkesville Historic District		Darkesville, West Virginia	c. 1795	Residence	
Old Stone House (Morgantown, West Virginia)		Morgantown, West Virginia	1796	Residence	
Orndoff-Cross House		Morgantown, West Virginia	1796	Residence	
Old Stone Church (Lewisburg, West Virginia)		Lewisburg, West Virginia	1796	Church	
Stone Manse		Caldwell, West Virginia	1796	Parsonage	
Edward Rumsey House, Tuscarora Creek Historic District		near Martinsburg, West Virginia	c. 1796	Residence	
Elmwood (Shepherdstown, West Virginia)		near Shepherdstown, West Virginia	1797	Residence	
Richwood Hall		near Charles Town, West Virginia	1797	Residence	Built for Lawrence Augustine Washington, expanded in 19th century
Miller's Tavern		Wellsburg, West Virginia	1797	Inn	Demolished 2019
John Mathias House		Mathias, West Virginia	1797	Residence	Expanded 1825
Mill Island (Moorefield, West Virginia)		near Moorefield, West Virginia	c. 1798	Residence	Expanded 1840
Hillside (Charles Town, West Virginia)		near Charles Town, West Virginia	c. 1799	Residence	
Harper's Ferry Armory		Harper's Ferry, West Virginia	1799	Armory	Site of abolitionist John Brown's raid in 1859.
Beall-Air		Halltown, West Virginia	rear section before 1800	Residence	Built for Lewis Washington, was involved in John Brown's raid
William Wilson House (Gerrardstown, West Virginia)		Gerrardstown, West Virginia	Between 1792 and 1802	Residence	
Springhill, Mill Creek Historic District		Bunker Hill, West Virginia	c. 1790	Residence	

== See also ==
- National Register of Historic Places listings in West Virginia
- History of West Virginia
- Oldest buildings in the United States
