= The Hermitage (Charles Town, West Virginia) =

Historic house in West Virginia, United States

- U.S. National Register of Historic Places
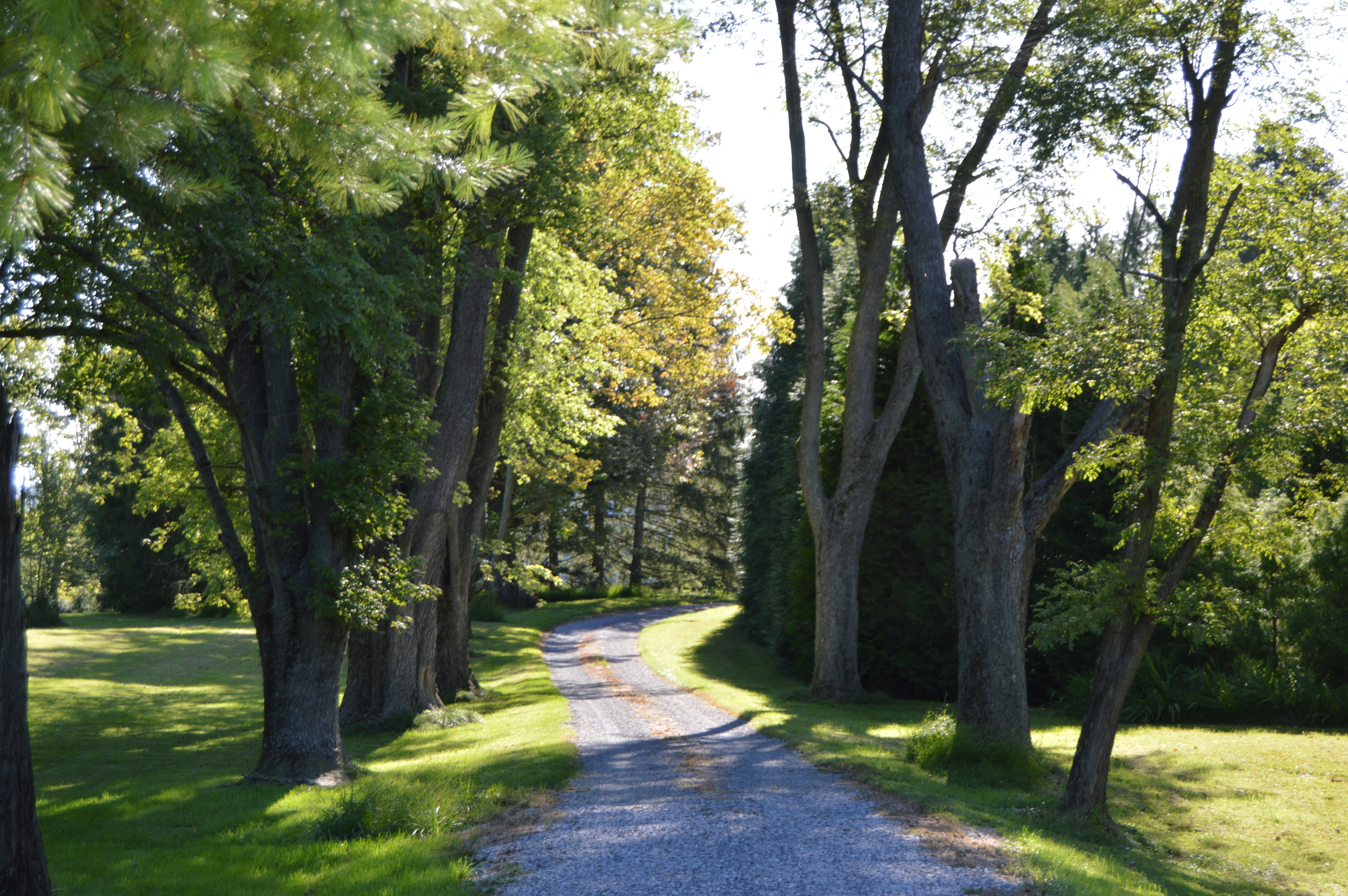
- Property entrance

- Location within West Virginia Location within the United States
- Nearest city: Charles Town, West Virginia
- Coordinates: 39°14′53″N 77°50′30″W
- Architectural style: Early Republic, Late Victorian
- NRHP reference No.: 93001444
- Added to NRHP: December 23, 1993

The Hermitage near Charles Town, West Virginia is historic property which includes several buildings, as well as non-contributing tennis courts and a pool. The oldest structure is a small stone cottage dating to circa 1734, making it one of the oldest buildings in West Virginia. It resembles Prato Rio in nearby Leetown, West Virginia and may date to this property's first owner, Daniel Barnett, who was a partner in the Burr Iron Works (a/k/a the Bloomery forge) circa 1740, the first of its kind in the state. A stone privy is also believed to be the oldest structure of its kind in the state.

The two story wooden farmhouse (incorporating an old log structure in the back) is associated primarily with the Chew family, who moved into the house from Loudoun County, Virginia in the mid-19th century, when Roger Preston Chew was three. The L-shape is due to an incorporated stone cookhouse wing. As a Virginia Military Institute cadet, Chew helped control crowds attending the execution of John Brown after his raid on nearby Harper's Ferry. Col. Roger Chew later became a distinguished Confederate artillery and cavalry officer. During the American Civil War, Chew's flying artillery was engaged in more skirmishes and battles than any battery in the Confederate Army, and Col. Chew eventually commanded five battalions of two batteries.

Both Roger and his brother Robert (who also served in the Confederate light artillery), rebuilt the estate after the war's end, and the interior was extensively remodeled during the Victorian era.

In 1871, Chew married Louise Fontaine Washington, daughter of the last owner of Mount Vernon, at Blakeley. He then became an important business man in the area, as well as serving in the House of Delegates from 1882 to 1888.

== See also ==
- List of the oldest buildings in West Virginia
