= Snodgrass (disambiguation) =

Snodgrass is a surname of Scottish origin. It may also refer to the following places:

== In the United States ==
- Snodgrass Tavern, a National Register of Historic Places site in Berkeley County, West Virginia
- Snodgrass Hill, site of the American Civil War Battle of Chickamauga in 1863
- Snodgrass Mountain at Crested Butte, Colorado
- Snodgrass Cemetery in Saluda, Indiana
- Snodgrass Cemetery outside Vienna, Missouri
- Snodgrass Cemetery in Gandeeville, West Virginia
- Snodgrass Lake in Matanuska-Susitna Borough, Alaska
- Snodgrass Lake in Crow Wing County, Minnesota
- Ellis C. Snodgrass Memorial Bridge, Yarmouth, Maine

== Elsewhere ==
- Snodgrass Island, Antarctica
- Snodgrass Lagoon on Waterloo Creek in Australia, site of the Waterloo Creek massacre in 1838
- Snodgrass Road, Westport, New Zealand
- Snodgrass Village, near River Garnock, Scotland - see Ardeer Platform railway station
