= William Snodgrass =

William Snodgrass may refer to:

- W. D. Snodgrass (William De Witt Snodgrass, 1926–2009), American poet
- William Davis Snodgrass (1796–1886), American Presbyterian minister
- William R. Snodgrass (1922–2008), Tennessee Comptroller of the Treasury
- William Snodgrass (minister) (1827–1906), Canadian Presbyterian minister and the sixth Principal of Queen's College, now Queen's University
- William Snodgrass (politician) (1870–1939), politician from Nelson, New Zealand
