= Spring Mills Historic District =

Historic district in West Virginia, United States

- U.S. National Register of Historic Places
- U.S. Historic district
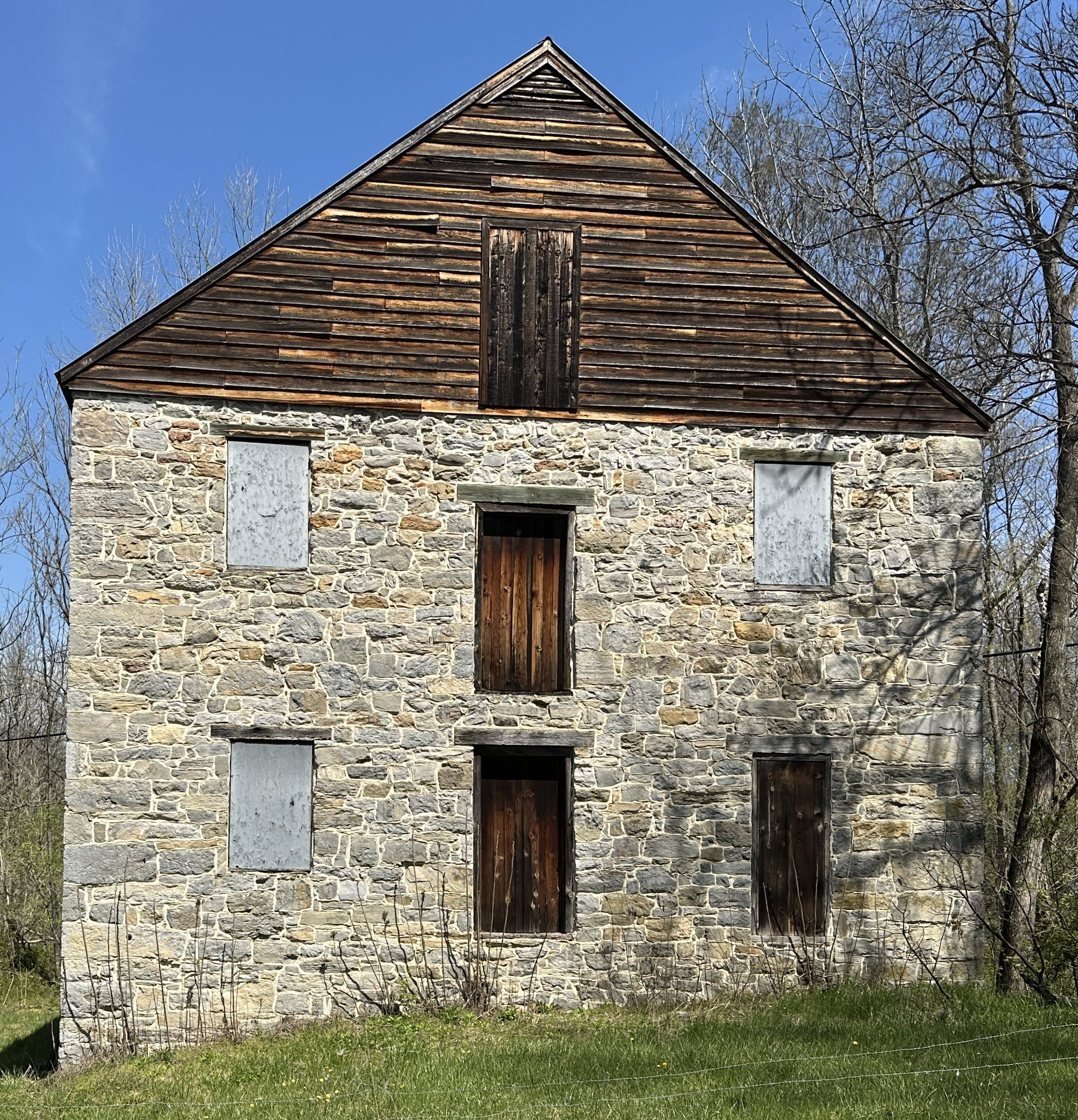
- Stephen-Hammond Mill built in 1790

- Location within West Virginia Location within the United States
- Location: Portions of Hammonds Mill Rd. and Harlan Spring Rd., Hedgesville, West Virginia
- Coordinates: 39°33′36″N 77°57′12″W
- Area: 28 acres (11 ha)
- Built: 1790
- Architectural style: Greek Revival, Federal
- NRHP reference No.: 04000308
- Added to NRHP: April 15, 2004

Spring Mills Historic District is a national historic district located near Spring Mills, West Virginia. It encompasses five contributing buildings, constructed between about 1790 and 1922, and two contributing sites. They include the Falling Waters Presbyterian Church (1834) and Manse (1922) and Stephen Hammond Mill (c. 1790), Miller's House (c. 1790), and Spring House (c. 1800). The buildings are of masonry construction. The sites are the Falling Waters Presbyterian Church Cemetery and the site of Dr. Allen Hammonds House.

It was listed on the National Register of Historic Places in 2004.
