= Hughes-Cunningham House =

Historic house in West Virginia, United States

- U.S. National Register of Historic Places
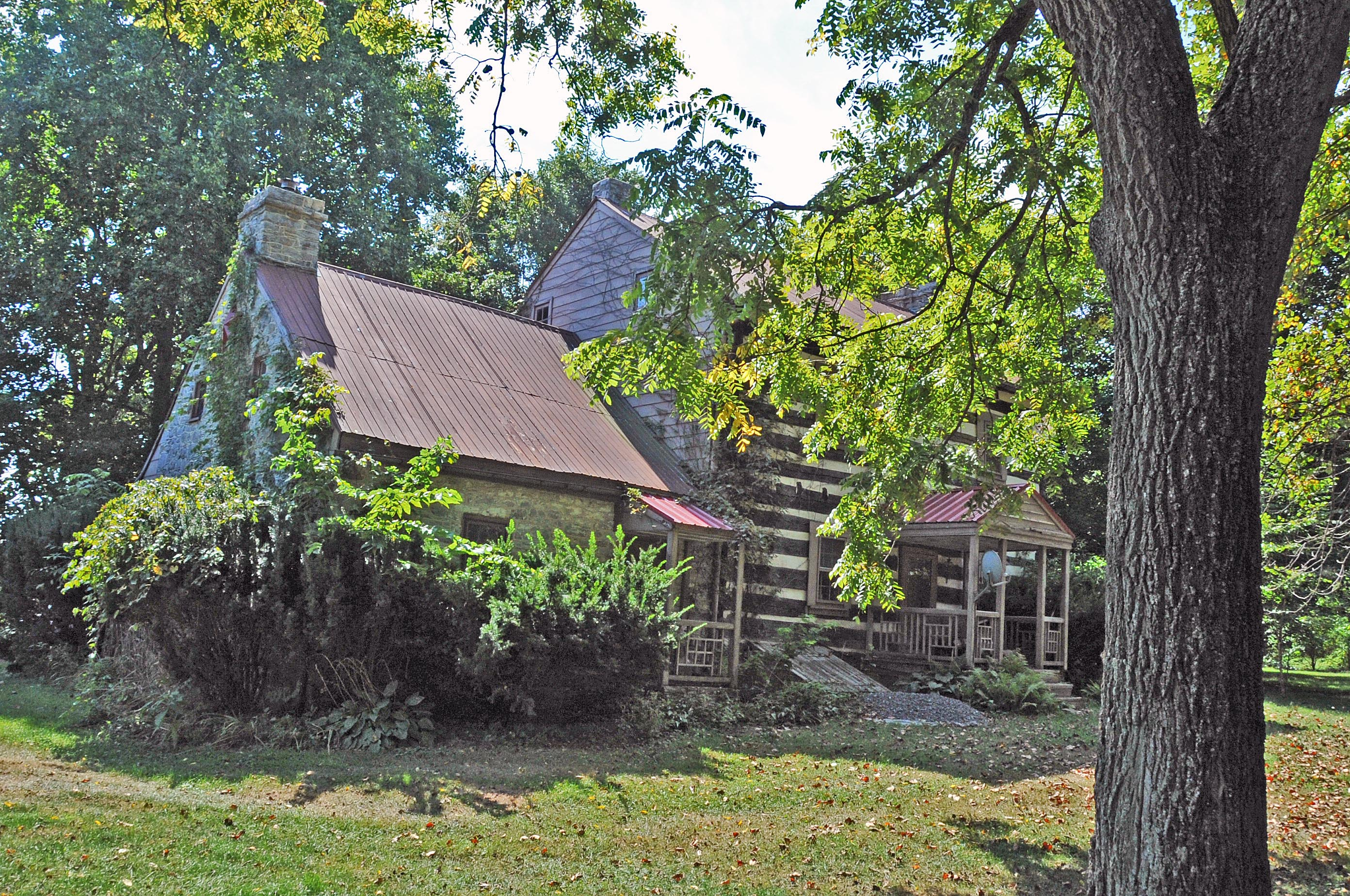
- The house in 2009 before it was destroyed in a 2017 fire

- Location within West Virginia Location within the United States
- Location: Harlan Springs Rd., near Hedgesville, West Virginia
- Coordinates: 39°32′10″N 77°57′38″W
- Area: 1 acre (0.40 ha)
- Built: 1772; 254 years ago
- Architect: Hughes, Isaac; Cunningham, Hugh
- Architectural style: Late Permanent Settler
- NRHP reference No.: 85001518
- Added to NRHP: July 8, 1985

Hughes-Cunningham House, also known as "HuCuRu," was a historic home located near Hedgesville, Berkeley County, West Virginia. The log and stone house was in two sections. The main section was built in 1772 and was a two-story, three-bay, gable roofed log building on a stone foundation. It measured 30 feet wide by 25 feet deep. A two-bay, one story stone wing was added about 1784.

It was listed on the National Register of Historic Places in 1985. The house was destroyed in a fatal fire on August 27, 2017.
