= Samuel Hedges House =

Historic house in West Virginia, United States

- U.S. National Register of Historic Places
- Location within West Virginia Location within the United States
- Location: County Route 9/10, near Hedgesville, West Virginia
- Coordinates: 39°31′40″N 77°59′52″W
- Area: 3 acres (1.2 ha)
- Built: c. 1772, c. 1855
- Architect: Hedges, Samuel
- NRHP reference No.: 76001931
- Added to NRHP: December 12, 1976

Samuel Hedges House is a historic home located near Hedgesville in Berkeley County, West Virginia, United States. It is a two-story, L-shaped dwelling with a three-bay wide, gable roofed limestone main block and frame ell. The main block was built about 1772 and the addition built in the mid-1850s. It features a pedimented entrance porch supported by Doric order columns. Also on the property is a 1 1/2-story coursed-rubble outbuilding and a log smokehouse.

It was listed on the National Register of Historic Places in 1976.
