= Old Stone House (Morgantown, West Virginia) =

Historic house in West Virginia, United States

- U.S. National Register of Historic Places
- U.S. Historic district – Contributing property
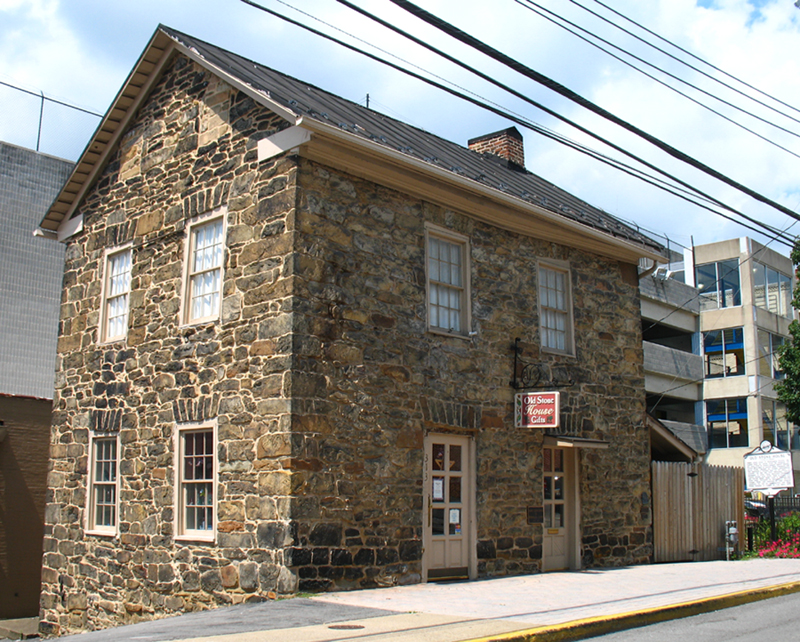
- Old Stone House, August 2008

- Location within West Virginia Location within the United States
- Location: Chestnut St., Morgantown, West Virginia
- Coordinates: 39°37′49″N 79°57′26″W
- Area: 0.4 acres (0.16 ha)
- Built: c. 1796
- NRHP reference No.: 72001290
- Added to NRHP: December 27, 1972

Old Stone House is a historic home located at Morgantown, Monongalia County, West Virginia. The original section was built about 1796, and is a two-story stone structure measuring 26 feet, 8 inches, by 20 feet, 8 inches. A one-story, timber-frame addition built in the early 1900s and measures 16 feet, 7 inches, by 16 feet, 4 inches. The Old Stone House was the home of John W. Thompson, a potter in early Morgan's Town. He was able to create red ware and stoneware pots from the clay found in the basement of the house. It is one of the oldest surviving examples of rustic pioneer architecture in Monongalia County. In 1935, it became headquarters of the Morgantown Service League, which operates a gift shop in the house.

It was listed on the National Register of Historic Places in 1972. It is located in the Downtown Morgantown Historic District, listed in 1996.

== See also ==
- List of the oldest buildings in West Virginia
