= Hedgesville Historic District =

Historic district in West Virginia, United States

- U.S. National Register of Historic Places
- U.S. Historic district
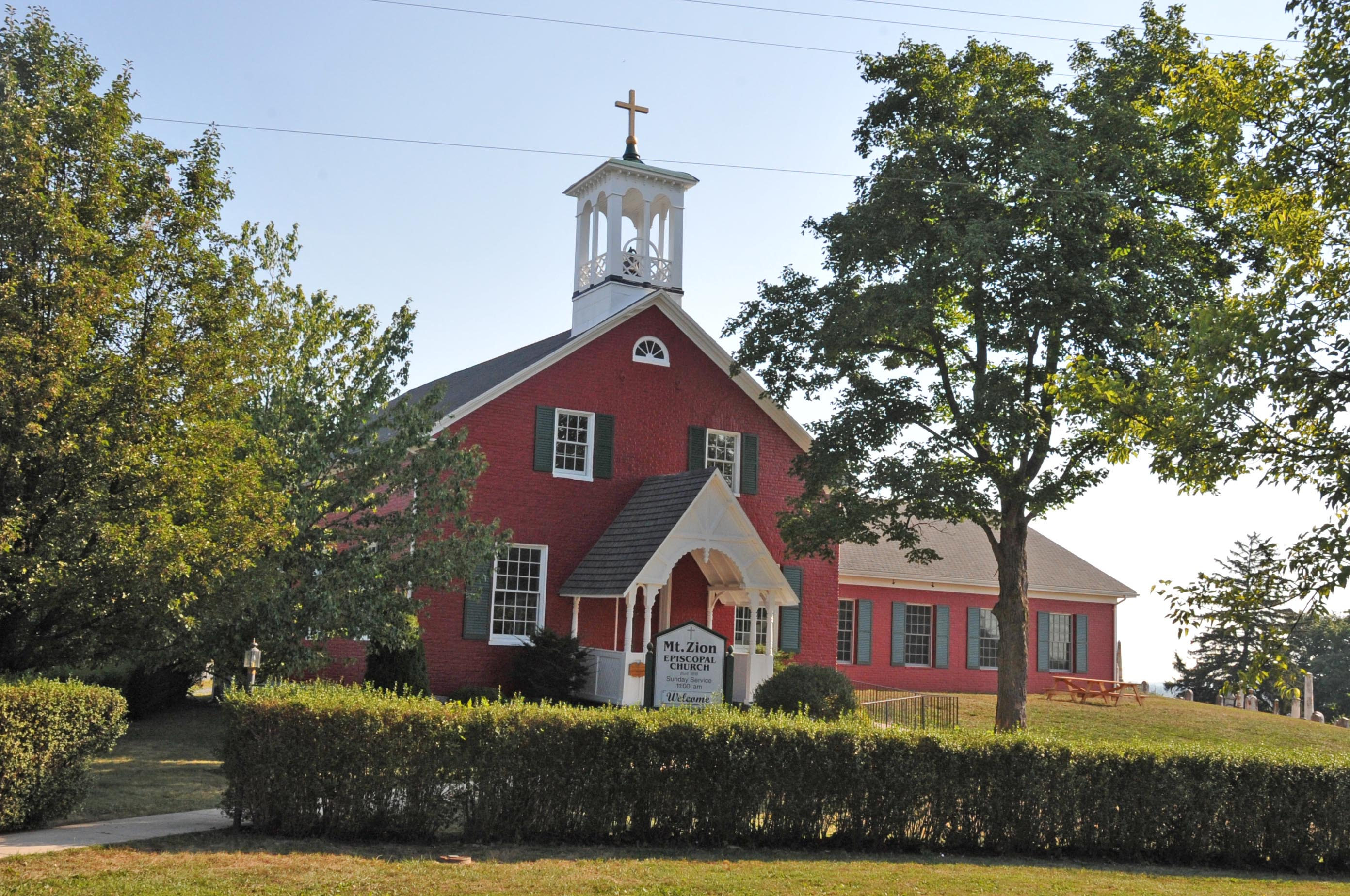

- Location within West Virginia Location within the United States
- Location: Roughly bounded by N. and S. Mary St., and E. and W. Main St., Hedgesville, West Virginia
- Coordinates: 39°33′12″N 77°59′39″W
- Area: 29 acres (12 ha)
- Architect: Multiple
- Architectural style: Greek Revival, Stick/Eastlake, Carpenter Gothic
- MPS: Berkeley County MRA
- NRHP reference No.: 80004419
- Added to NRHP: December 10, 1980

Hedgesville Historic District is a national historic district located at Hedgesville, Berkeley County, West Virginia. It encompasses 55 contributing buildings and one contributing site, the Town Spring. Notable buildings include the Presbyterian Church and Manse, Ashton House, Robinson Log House, Hat Shop, Stuckey House, Westenhaver-McKee House, Mt. Zion Episcopal Church and Hedgesville Cemetery, Jacob Hull Mansion, and Bodine's Tavern. Included are notable examples of Queen Anne and Greek Revival-style architecture.

It was listed on the National Register of Historic Places in 1980.
