= Byrnside-Beirne-Johnson House =

Historic house in West Virginia, United States

- U.S. National Register of Historic Places
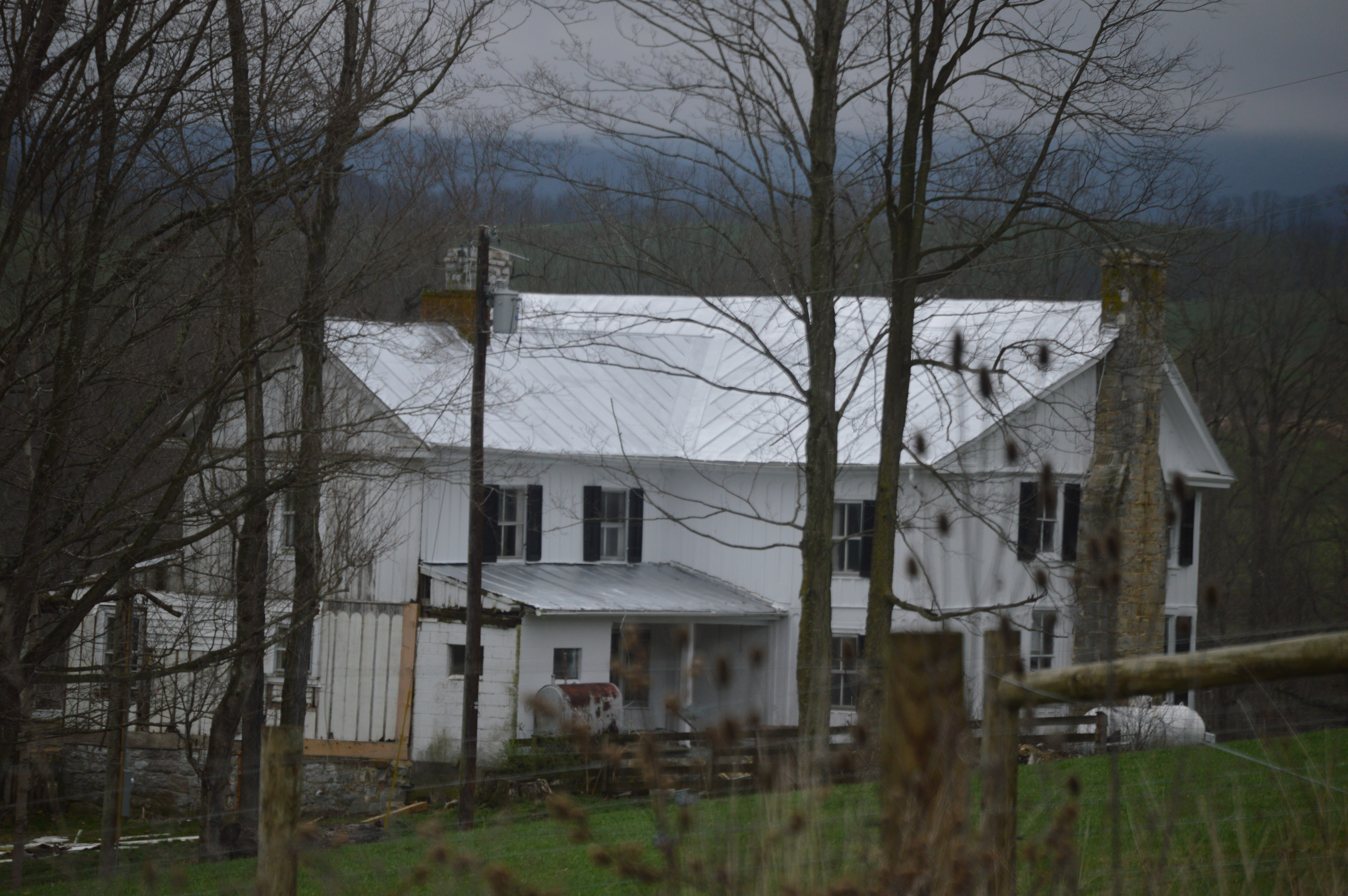
- Rear and southwestern side

- Location within West Virginia Location within the United States
- Location: County Route 13 south of Union, near Union, West Virginia
- Coordinates: 37°34′30″N 80°32′19″W
- Area: 8 acres (3.2 ha)
- Built: 1770
- Architectural style: Gothic Revival
- NRHP reference No.: 93001358
- Added to NRHP: December 2, 1993

Byrnside-Beirne-Johnson House, also known as "Willowbrook," is a historic home located near Union, Monroe County, West Virginia. The house began as a pioneer log fort built by six families in 1770. After 1855, it was enlarged to a large 2 1/2-story, five-bay, T-shaped dwelling with a two-story rear wing. It is covered with board-and-batten siding in the Gothic Revival style. The front features a two-story gable end porch built about 1900. Also on the property is a contributing smokehouse.

It was listed on the National Register of Historic Places in 1991.

The eastern log structure in the home was originally known as Byrnside's (or Burnside's) Fort. James Byrnside was clearly an important person in the early settlement and defense of the area, having come into the sinks of Monroe area in the early 1760s and again in 1769 or 1770, having been burned out in 1763. He amassed considerable wealth and power in the area, for example, being taxed for 3,750 acres in 1783 (1783 Greenbrier County Land Roll). Five separate pension applicants mentioned being stationed at Byrnside's Fort (Bradshaw, Christy, Kincaid, Swope, Wincleback) between 1776 and 1781. The most commonly mentioned commander for these men was a Capt. Wright, as well as James Byrnside himself. John Stuart mentions trying to raise men under Capt. Byrnside in 1777, which adds further support for his extensive involvement (Thwaites and Kellogg 1908:240). Byrnside's Fort was probably a fairly important regional fort. The pension application of John Bradshaw suggests that spies from Byrnside's patrolled an area that butted up against the area that was covered by spies from Cook's Fort. Byrnside's Fort was used as a place of rendezvous for an expedition to Fort Chiswell and on to Kentucky in February 1781 under Major Hamilton, Lt. Woods, Capt. Henderson, Capt. Davidson and Capt. Armstrong as well as providing the more typical protection of an immediate hinterland. In August 1782, James Byrnside was awarded damages of over £12 for "damage done him by a party of militia from this county on their march to Kentucky (Greenbrier County Court Minutes, cited from Stinson 1988:13).

Virginia Militia records show that there were twelve "Indian Spies" in service from 1776 through 1779, ranging between Cook's Fort and Byrnside's Fort, both along Indian Creek in what was then Augusta County, Virginia (now Monroe County, West Virginia).

Willowbrook, including the original structure of Byrnside's Fort, is now in the process of restoration.

== See also ==
- List of the oldest buildings in West Virginia
