= Strode-Morrison-Tabler House and Farm =

Historic house in West Virginia, United States

- U.S. National Register of Historic Places
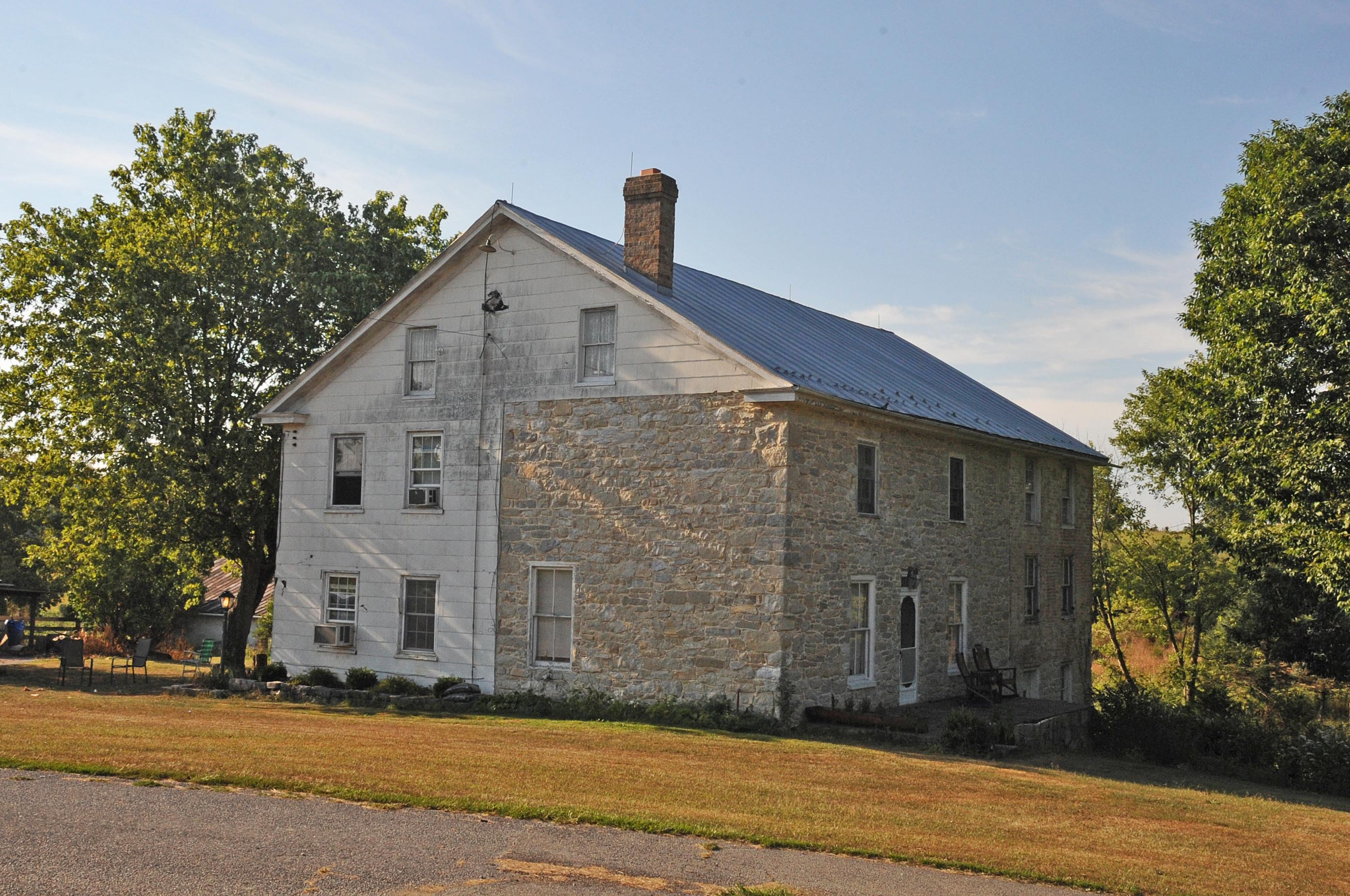

- Location within West Virginia Location within the United States
- Location: 1270 Jacobs Rd. near Hedgesville, West Virginia
- Coordinates: 39°30′42″N 77°52′34″W
- Area: 125 acres (51 ha)
- Built: 1752
- Architectural style: Hall-and-parlor
- NRHP reference No.: 06000173
- Added to NRHP: March 22, 2006

Strode-Morrison-Tabler House and Farm is a historic home located near Hedgesville, Berkeley County, West Virginia. It is a farmhouse of brick, limestone, and wood construction that began in 1752 as a single-story, side-gable, two-bay cottage of rubble limestone that subsequently underwent several additions during the 19th century. These additions include a brick upper story added to the original house and a three-bay, limestone addition constructed about 1830. This limestone addition became the principal section of the house. A wood-frame addition was built along the rear of the house by the end of the 19th century. Also on the property are four sheds / outbuildings (c. 1920–1950), a garage (c. 1930), and barn complex (c. 1752 and later).

It was listed on the National Register of Historic Places in 2006.
