= Snodgrass Tavern =

Historic tavern in West Virginia, United States

- U.S. National Register of Historic Places
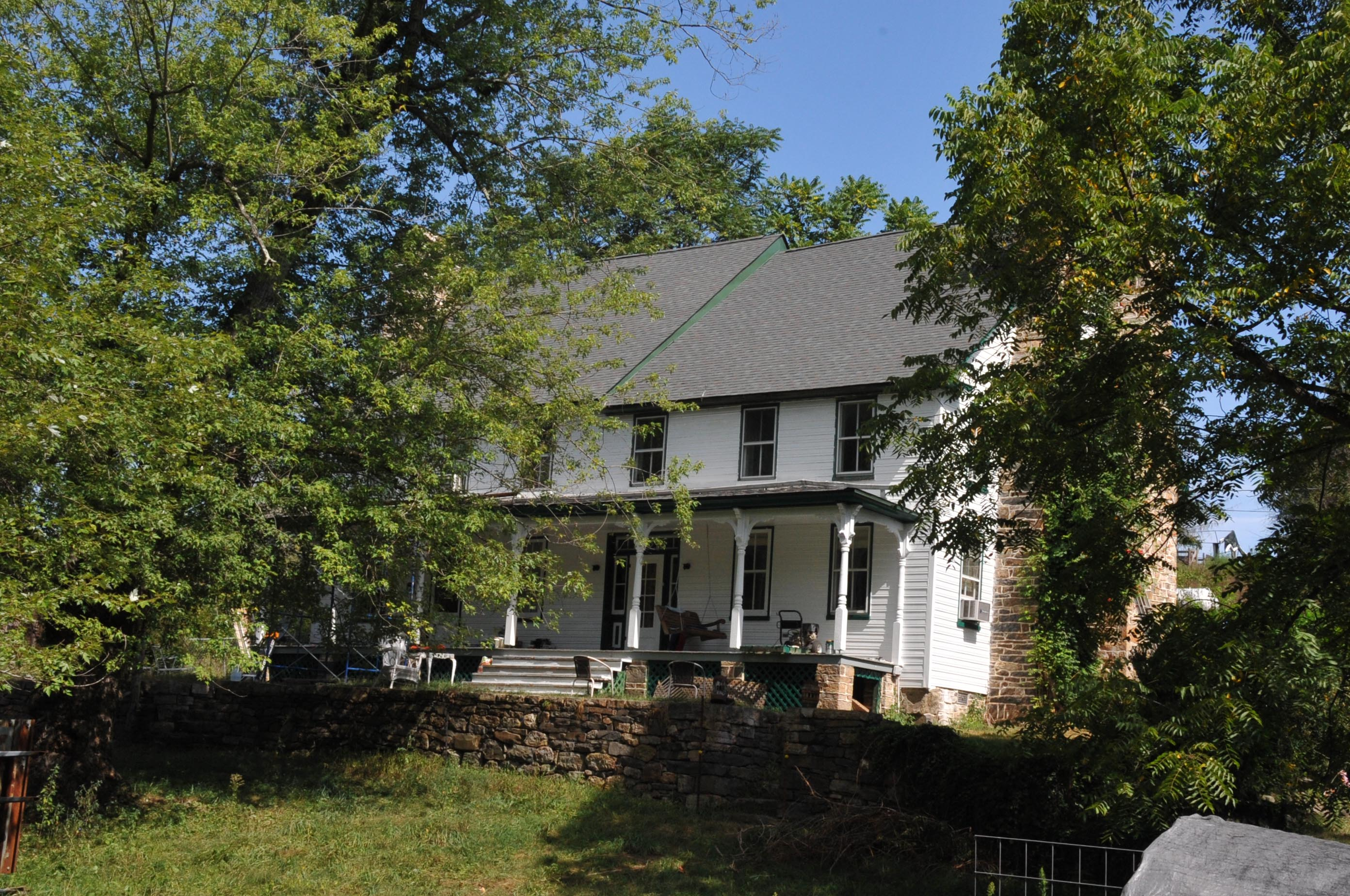

- Location within West Virginia Location within the United States
- Location: West of Hedgesville on WV 9
- Coordinates: 39°33′25″N 78°01′00″W
- Area: .27 acres (0.11 ha) (original); 205 acres (83 ha) (boundary increase)
- Built: 1742
- NRHP reference No.: 73001896 (original); 06000172 (boundary increase)
- Added to NRHP: April 24, 1973 (original); March 22, 2006 (boundary increase)

Snodgrass Tavern is an historic tavern located near Hedgesville in Berkeley County, West Virginia. The structure was built in stages beginning around 1742, and is one of the oldest buildings in West Virginia still standing. It is uncertain when the structure became a tavern; but according to Early Hedgesville Chronicles 1720–1947, by William Moore, an account of Robert Snodgrass's wife, Susannah and their first daughter, baby Elizabeth describes it having been used as a tavern during the Indian wars at the brink of the French and Indian War (early to mid 1750s). Specifically, they hid beneath the floors of the tavern, while the Indians drank and fought above. The tavern lasted until 1847, when the property was sold as a private residence. The structure and surrounding property is listed on the National Register of Historic Places.

== History ==
It is unclear who built the original sections of the tavern. One source states that in 1732, Lord Fairfax granted William Snodgrass a 1,000-acre (400 ha) tract of land in what is now Berkeley County, West Virginia, upon which he began building the tavern. However, other sources claim John Ford began the original construction, selling the land at some point to the Rawlings family, who then sold the land to Robert Snodgrass in 1779. Nevertheless, the Snodgrass name became associated with the tavern. Beginning around 1742, construction of the building was begun. The first section built was a 1 1/2-story square log structure of side length 15 feet (4.6 m). This was followed about fifteen years later by a separate two-story log structure approximately 10 feet to the west of the first structure. Eventually these separate structures were connected, and the first section was increased to a full two stories. Around 1813, the last addition to the tavern was added along the entire length of the northern side of the structure and was constructed from sandstone. The building has twin 32-foot (9.8 m) chimneys on both ends, which is considered an unusual feature in the area. A veranda spans the full length of the building's front side.

Although the exact date when the structure became a tavern is uncertain, it is believed to have become such gradually and at an early date. The tavern room was 18 feet (5.5 m) by 24 feet (7.3 m) in dimension, which was exceptionally large for tavern rooms of that era. The tavern was located approximately halfway between Martinsburg and what is now known as Berkeley Springs. This led to the property being referred to as the Halfway House. The tavern lasted until 1847, when James Snodgrass, who refused to sell liquor (causing business to dwindle), began renting out the tavern and eventually sold it. The building became a private residence, in which state it remains.

The tavern received several notable visitors throughout its existence. George Washington visited the tavern on multiple occasions. The first visit occurred in 1750, when Washington was surveying land for Lord Fairfax. Another visit was recorded in Washington's diary on September 5, 1784. Washington also stopped at Snodgrass when traveling to Berkeley Springs (also known as Bath) on other occasions. Noted politician Henry Clay visited Snodgrass Tavern while visiting friends in the area during July 1827, at which time he was the U.S. Secretary of State.

The tavern was originally listed on the National Register of Historic Places on April 24, 1973. On March 22, 2006, the property's boundaries were extended from an original area of .27 acres (0.11 ha) (the tavern itself) to 205 acres (83 ha). This expansion was done to include other historic structures and sites on the property, including a slave cemetery and various outbuildings. Snodgrass Tavern is one of the oldest buildings still standing in West Virginia.

== See also ==
- National Register of Historic Places listings in Berkeley County, West Virginia
