= Hedges-Lemen House =

Historic house in West Virginia, United States

- U.S. National Register of Historic Places
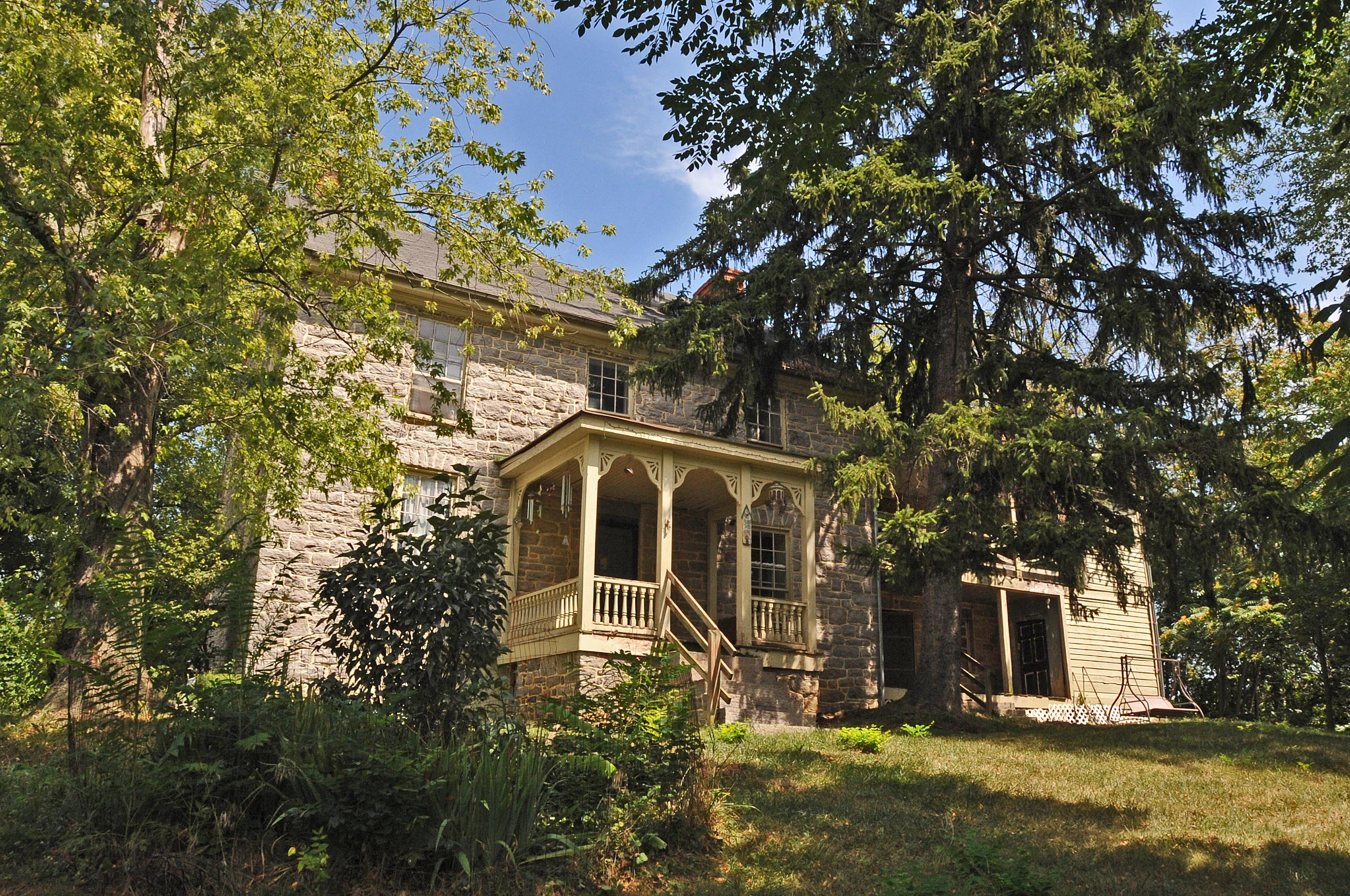

- Location within West Virginia Location within the United States
- Location: County Route 4, 0.7 miles north of its junction with WV 9, near Hedgesville, West Virginia
- Coordinates: 39°32′31″N 77°58′47″W
- Area: 6 acres (2.4 ha)
- Built: 1748
- Architect: Joshua and Jesse Hedges
- Architectural style: Greek Revival, Federal
- NRHP reference No.: 91000556
- Added to NRHP: May 2, 1991

Hedges-Lemen House, also known as "Fort Hill," is a historic home located near Hedgesville in Berkeley County, West Virginia, United States. It is a two-story, gable roof, limestone dwelling with a central block and wing. The central block was built in 1748 by Joshua Hedges as an Indian fort named "Fort Hill;" the wing was added in 1792. It measures 36 feet wide by 30 feet deep and the wing measures 30 feet wide by 28 feet deep. Also on the property is a stone barn (c. 1840) and Lemen family cemetery.

It was listed on the National Register of Historic Places in 1991.
