= Union Bryarly's Mill =

- U.S. National Register of Historic Places
- U.S. Historic district
- Location within West Virginia Location within the United States
- Location: Address Unknown, Darkesville, West Virginia
- Coordinates: 39°22′16″N 78°1′41″W
- Area: 0 acres (0 ha)
- Built: c. 1835
- Architect: Buckles, James; Bryarly, Robert
- MPS: Berkeley County MRA
- NRHP reference No.: 80004440
- Added to NRHP: December 10, 1980

Union Bryarly's Mill is a historic flour and grist mill complex and national historic district located at Darkesville, Berkeley County, West Virginia, United States. It encompasses four contributing buildings and two contributing sites. The buildings are the Bryarly Mill, Mansion House, a log smokehouse and combination ice house building, the log miller's house (1751), the site of a distillery and foundation containing archaeological remains. The mill was built about 1835 and is a two-story, three-bay brick building with a gable roof. The Mansion House was built about 1835 and is a two-story, L-shaped frame dwelling on a stone foundation.

It was listed on the National Register of Historic Places in 1980.
