= William Boggs Farm =

Historic house in West Virginia, United States

- Boggs, William, Farm
- U.S. National Register of Historic Places
- Location within West Virginia Location within the United States
- Location: Berkeley County, West Virginia, USA
- Nearest city: Hedgesville, West Virginia
- Coordinates: 39°32′25″N 78°1′32″W
- Built: 1790
- Architectural style: I-house
- NRHP reference No.: 00001310
- Added to NRHP: March 07, 2001

The William Boggs Farm is located in the Back Creek Valley of Berkeley County, West Virginia ner Hedgesville. The property was settled before 1750 by William Boggs, who may have been the first settler in the valley. A 1750 survey indicates that Boggs had 275 acres (111 ha) of land with a cabin. By 1766 Boggs had accumulated 527 acres (213 ha). Boggs grew cash crops in the fertile bottomlands along Back Creek and raised clover for pasturage on the hilltops.

After William Sr.'s death in 1791, his son, William Boggs, Jr. took over the land, working the farm until his death in 1836. The property was divided between Willam Jr.'s son John, with243 acres (98 ha) and daughter Jane with 307 acres (124 ha).In 1846 John sold his share for $2000 to Jane's husband, Thomas C. Harper. The farm was inherited in 1884 by John Boggs' daughter Theresa, who had lived at the firm with the Harpers. Encumbered by debts she inherited with the property, Theresa was forced to sell in 1887 to D.E. Stone.

The 2 1/2-story log house features a center hall plan with a room on each side of the main stair hall and two rooms upstairs. The interior log surfaces were whitewashed. Interior walls are beaded board. Mantels and stairs feature decorative carving of good quality for such a remote location. The exterior is clad with wide planking.

Nearby on the property a two-level root cellar is dug into a hillside, with entrances to the upper and lower levels on opposite sides. The farm was listed on the National Register of Historic Places in 2001.
