= R. Preston Chew =

Roger Preston Chew
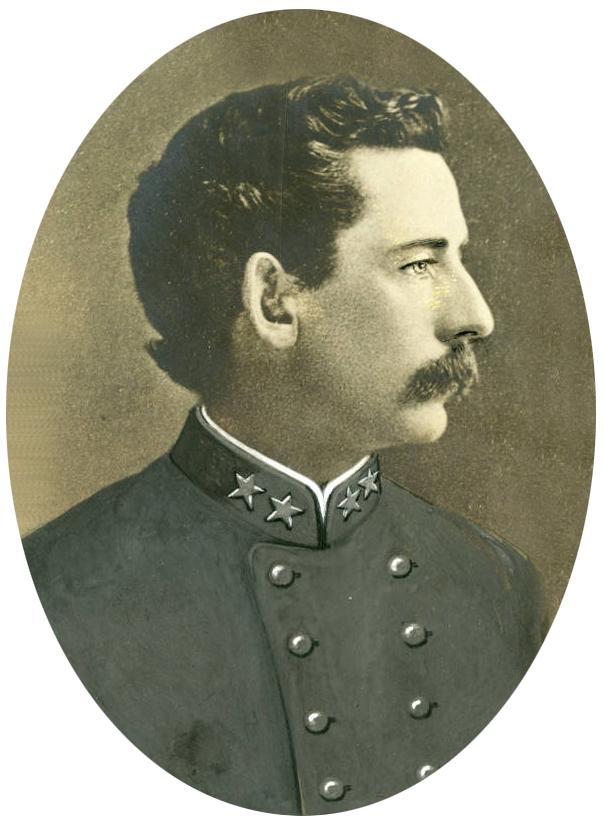
- Born: April 9, 1843; Loudoun County, Virginia
- Died: March 16, 1921 (aged 77); Charles Town, West Virginia
- Burial place: Zion Episcopal Churchyard, Charles Town, West Virginia
- Military career
- Allegiance: Confederate States of America
- Branch: Confederate States Army
- Service years: 1861–65 (CSA)
- Rank: Lieutenant Colonel
- Commands: Ashby's Horse Artillery, Stuart Horse Artillery
- Conflicts: American Civil War
- Other work: West Virginia Legislature 1882–1888

Signature
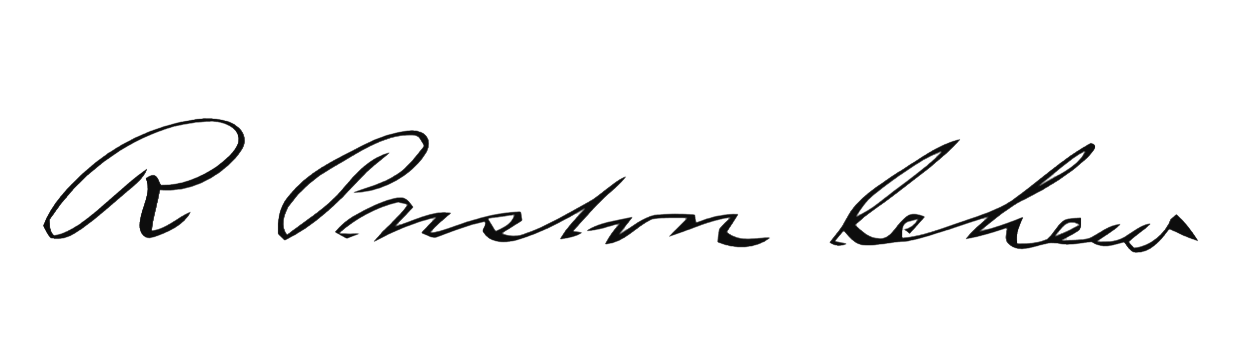

Roger Preston Chew (April 9, 1843 – March 16, 1921) was a noted horse artillery commander in the Confederate Army of Northern Virginia during the American Civil War for General Turner Ashby. After the war, he was a prominent West Virginia businessman and railroad executive, as well as a West Virginia legislator.

== Early life ==
Chew was born into a prominent family in Loudoun County, Virginia. His father was Roger Chew and his mother the former Sarah Aldridge. The family moved to Charles Town, West Virginia (then Virginia) when Roger was three years old, and he attended the Charles Town Academy, and later the Virginia Military Institute. The Chew family owned The Hermitage, one of the oldest houses in western Virginia.

== American Civil War ==
With the outbreak of the Civil War, young Chew raised a battery of horse artillery, "Chew's Battery," which eventually became part of the famous Laurel Brigade under General Turner Ashby, the cavalry commander for Stonewall Jackson's command. He and his brother John A. Chew participated in all Jackson's campaigns until Jackson's death in May 1863. Chew also led raids into Union-occupied Middleway, West Virginia in February 1863, and Charles Town on May 12, 1863. He then led his battery through the Gettysburg campaign, Bristoe Campaign and Mine Run Campaign as part of the Horse Artillery for J.E.B. Stuart's cavalry. Despite his youth, Chew was promoted to the chief of the Horse Artillery in February 1864, when Robert F. Beckham was sent to Tennessee. He served in this capacity for the rest of the war - at the Wilderness, Spotsylvania Court House, Cold Harbor, the Siege of Petersburg, and the Appomattox Campaign.

After the war, Roger Chew and his brother Robert rebuilt the family farm. In 1871, Roger married Louise Fontaine Washington, daughter of the last owner of Mount Vernon at Blakeley, and the couple would eventually have 6 children. Her father John Augustine Washington had served on General Lee's staff until killed in action in late 1861. Louise Chew purchased Blakeley from her financially struggling uncle in 1875, and maintained it until its sale in 1892.

Roger Chew engaged in numerous business ventures, including as the president of the Eagle Manufacturing Company. From 1882 until 1888, he also served in the House of Delegates. In 1883, the Shenandoah Valley Railroad constructed what became known as Chew's Siding, a private spur that led from the main line to Chew's business. In 1890, Chew and several business partners formed the Charles Town Mining, Manufacturing, and Improvement Company and Chew became its first president.

== Death and legacy ==
Chew died in Charles Town in 1921 and is buried in the Zion Episcopal Churchyard, as are his wife (who died in 1927) and brother (who died in 1898).
