= Snodgrass =

Family name

The family name Snodgrass is said to originate from lands in the parish of Irvine, Ayrshire, Scotland, known as Snodgrasse, or Snodgers, at a bend in the River Garnock at 55°38' north, 4°42' west, which were rented out in plots. Both forms are recorded in Ayrshire and Glasgow between the 13th and 16th centuries. The name means "smooth grass" (Juncus), i.e., grass without nodes, in Middle English. In 1528, a charter from the king lists the lands of "Snotgerss" as being one of the confirmed possessions of Hugh, third Earl of Eglinton; the next record seen of the name is in the late 17th century.

== Snodgrass in America ==
The first records of the Snodgrass family in the new world are in the early 18th century in Virginia. The Virginia town of Hedgesville (now West Virginia) was founded by William Snodgrass, who arrived in the American colonies in 1700. William Snodgrass is buried in the cemetery of Tuscarora Presbyterian Church in Berkeley County, West Virginia. Closer examination reveals a wave of immigrants from Scotland during the Highland Clearances, Highland Potato Famine (1846–1857), and Lowland Clearances; increasing family sizes probably prompted many Snodgrasses to leave when the land could no longer support all of them.

From Pennsylvania and other ports-of-entry, they have spread across the North American continent and today there are in excess of 6,000 Snodgrass families in the United States and Canada.

Ogden Nash divided humanity into Snodgrasses and Swozzlers in his poem "Are you a Snodgrass?"

== Snodgrass Clan ==
In April 1979, a Certificate of Incorporation was granted to the Snodgrass Clan, Inc. by the state of Indiana. This was brought about by Scott F. Hosier, Jr. and Laurence E. Snodgrass. Through Hosier's efforts a "grant of arms" was granted to the Clan on March 15, 1984 by the Chief Herald of Ireland; however, the petition to be granted a "grant of arms" by Scotland was never finalized.

In 1979, Hosier ordered and received the first order of the official Snodgrass tartan. The weave code for the Snodgrass tartan is K6 R2 Y2 B22 G26 B10 R2 Y2, which was sourced to Dgn. T. S. Davidson.

== People named Snodgrass ==
Snodgrass, as a surname, may refer to these notable people:

- Adrian Snodgrass (1931–2025), Australian architect and authority on Buddhist art
- Ann Snodgrass, American poet
- Anthony Snodgrass (born 1934), archaeologist
- Bob Snodgrass, American glass artist
- Brooklynn Snodgrass (born 1994), Canadian swimmer
- Carrie Snodgress (1946–2004), American actress, nominated for an Academy Award
- Chappie Snodgrass (1870–1951), American baseball player
- Charles Edward Snodgrass (1866–1936), American politician
- Dale Snodgrass (1949–2021), United States Naval Aviator and air show performer
- David Snodgrass (born 1958), Scottish cricketer
- Donald Ray Snodgrass (born 1935), American author
- Frank Snodgrass (1898–1976), New Zealand rugby player
- Frank E. Snodgrass (1920–1985), American oceanographer and electrical engineer
- Fred Snodgrass (1887–1974), American baseball player
- Guy Snodgrass (born 1976), American national security expert
- Harry Snodgrass (born 1963), American sound designer for film and television
- Harry M. Snodgrass (1895–1937), American pianist
- Henry C. Snodgrass (1848–1931), American politician
- John Snodgrass (diplomat) (1928–2008), British diplomat
- John F. Snodgrass (1804–1854), American politician
- John James Snodgrass (1796–1841), British Army lieutenant colonel
- Jon Snodgrass (sociologist), (1941–2015), Panamanian author
- Jon Snodgrass (musician), American singer-songwriter
- Kate Snodgrass, American theater director and playwright
- Kenneth Snodgrass (1784–1853), Scottish-born soldier and administrator in colonial Australia
- Klyne Snodgrass (born 1944), American theologian and author
- Lee Snodgrass (born 1969), American politician
- Lilburn H. Snodgrass (1859–1930), American politician
- Louise Virginia Snodgrass (1942–2009), American legislator
- Lynn Snodgrass (born c. 1951), Oregon Speaker of the House
- Mark A. Snodgrass (born 1964), American legislator
- Mary Ellen Snodgrass (born 1944), American author
- Melinda M. Snodgrass (born 1951), American science fiction writer
- Milton Moore Snodgrass (1931–2014), American author
- Natalie Snodgrass (born 1998), American ice hockey player
- Neil Snodgrass (1776–1849), Scottish inventor and engineer
- Peter Snodgrass (1817–1867), pastoralist and politician in colonial Australia
- Richard Bruce Snodgrass (born 1940), American writer and photographer
- Richard T. Snodgrass (born 1955), American computer scientist
- Robert Snodgrass (born 1987), Scottish footballer
- Robert Evans Snodgrass (1875–1962), American entomologist
- Robert R. Snodgrass (1902–1969), American politician from the state of Georgia
- Sally Snodgrass (1936–2022), American politician
- W. D. Snodgrass (1926–2009), American poet who also wrote under the pseudonym S. S. Gardons
- Warren Snodgrass, American pediatric urologist
- William Snodgrass (clergyman) (1827–1906), Canadian Presbyterian minister and the sixth Principal of Queen's College, now Queen's University
- William Snodgrass (politician) (1870–1939), politician from Nelson, New Zealand
- William Davis Snodgrass (1796–1885), American Presbyterian clergyman
- William R. Snodgrass (1922–2008), Tennessee Comptroller of the Treasury

== Fictional characters ==
- Miss Snodgrass, the archetypal punctilious English teacher
- Amanda Snodgrass, the English teacher at North Jackson High in the HBO series Vice Principals, played by Georgia King
- Augustus Snodgrass, a major character in the novel The Pickwick Papers by Charles Dickens
- Homer Snodgrass, a character in The Mad Scientists' Club stories by Bertrand R. Brinley
- Samuel J. Snodgrass, supposed to have declared "Make 'Em Laugh" on his way to the guillotine as explained in the 1952 movie Singin' in the Rain.
- Thomas Jefferson Snodgrass, pen name used by Samuel Clemens (Mark Twain) for a sequence of travel letters now known as "The Thomas Jefferson Snodgrass Letters"
- The title character of "The Deadly Mission of Phineas Snodgrass", a short story in the collection Day Million by Frederik Pohl
- Pongo Snodgrass, of the titular comic strip in the British comics magazine Whizzer and Chips
- "Snodgrass", a story in Snodgrass and Other Illusions, a collection of short stories by Ian MacLeod in which John Lennon lives in an alternate history
- Ms. Snodgrass, a blackbird talent agent who persuades Van Go Lion to enter a panting Contest on the children's television series Zoobilee Zoo.
