= Charles W. Alderson =

American politician (1846–1914)

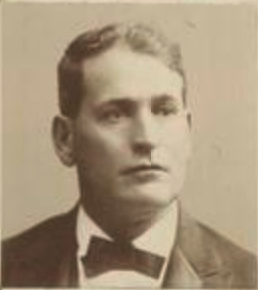

Member of the Virginia House of Delegates for Washington and Bristol
- In office December 2, 1891 – December 6, 1893 Serving with Lilburn H. Snodgrass
- Preceded by: E. S. Kendrick
- Succeeded by: William H. Tomney

Personal details
- Born: Charles William Alderson; June 21, 1846
- Died: March 23, 1914 (aged 67)
- Party: Democratic
- Spouse: Sallie Edmondson

Military service
- Allegiance: Confederate States
- Branch/service: Confederate States Army
- Years of service: 1863–1865
- Rank: Private
- Unit: 16th Virginia Cavalry
- Battles/wars: American Civil War

Charles William Alderson (June 21, 1846 – March 23, 1914) was an American politician who served in the Virginia House of Delegates.
