= Hopewell (Millville, West Virginia) =

Historic house in West Virginia, United States

- U.S. National Register of Historic Places
- Location within West Virginia Location within the United States
- Location: Jefferson County, West Virginia, USA
- Nearest city: Charles Town, West Virginia
- Coordinates: 39°16′4″N 77°47′36″W
- Built: 1765
- Architect: William, Sr. Little
- NRHP reference No.: 94000214
- Added to NRHP: March 25, 1994

Hopewell, also known as Hopewell Mills and Hopewell Farm, was established around 1765 by William Little, Sr., who built grain and saw mills near the Shenandoah River. In 1827, William Little, Jr. sold the property to James Hite and Jacob Newcomer. Hite named the property "Hopewell", identifying the mill with a place in Leetown also named Hopewell, where there was a Quaker meeting house. Hite's descendant, Thomas Hite Willis, operated and expanded the mill, adding a woolen mill. The woolen mill operated until the 1920s providing uniforms for the Army.

The complex includes a log-and-clapboard house, built circa 1765 with twentieth century additions, a tenant house (known as the "Viand Cottage") from the same era and of similar construction, several outbuildings and the ruins of the woolen mill, circa 1850.
