= White Bush =

Historic house in West Virginia, United States

- U.S. National Register of Historic Places
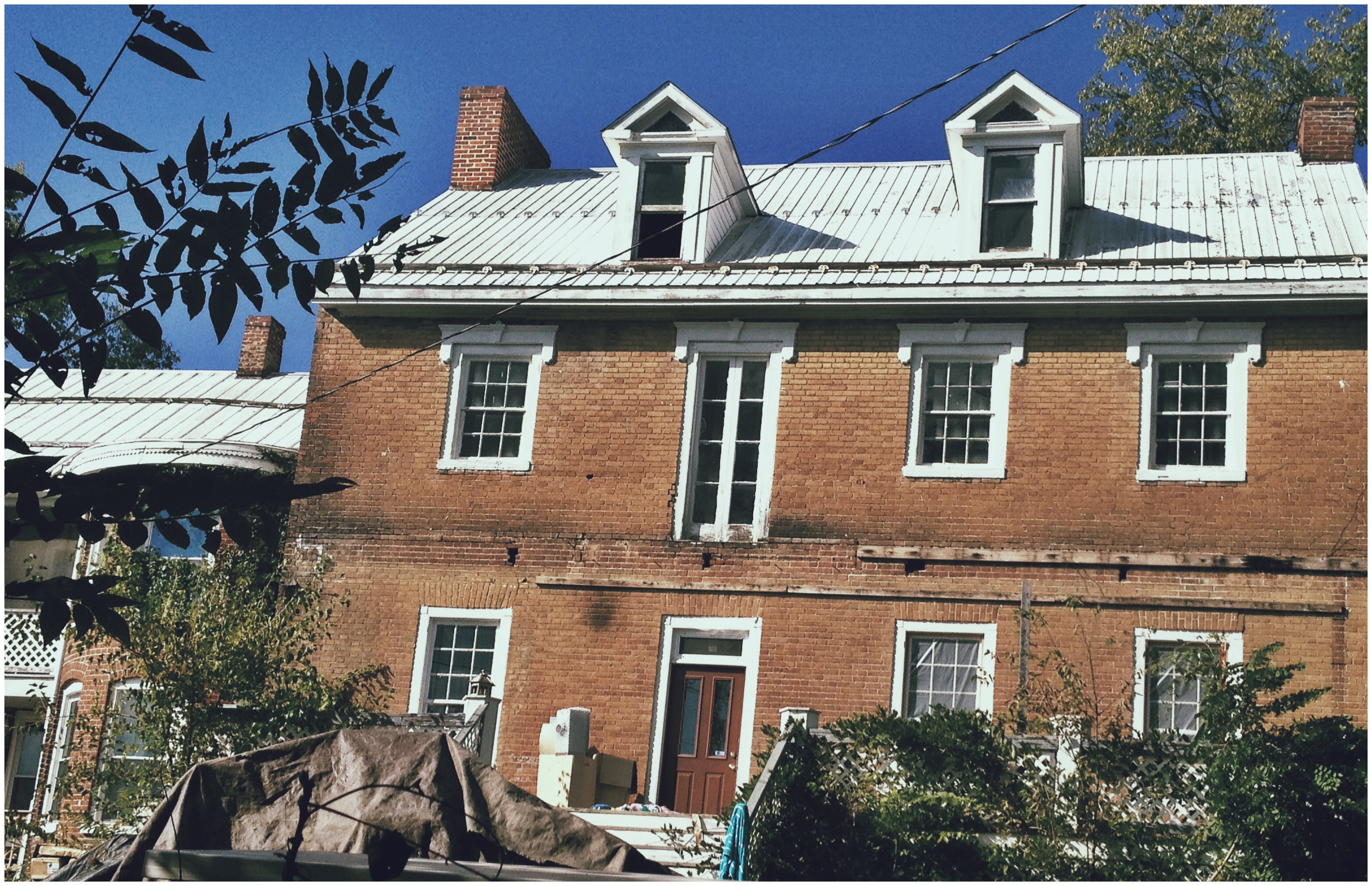

- Location within West Virginia Location within the United States
- Location: Rt. 11/3, Falling Waters, West Virginia
- Coordinates: 39°34′8″N 77°52′19″W
- Area: 1 acre (0.40 ha)
- Built: 1790
- Architectural style: Georgian, Federal
- MPS: Berkeley County MRA
- NRHP reference No.: 80004428
- Added to NRHP: December 10, 1980

White Bush, alternately spelled Whitebush, is one of Berkeley County, West Virginia's oldest brick mansions. It was built circa 1781–1785 by Archibald Shearer, who had purchased the entire bend of the Potomac River in this area, about 1,200 acres (4.9 km^{2}). The area at that time was part of Frederick County, Virginia. The property was formerly owned by Lord Fairfax, Thomas Fairfax, 6th Lord Fairfax of Cameron but was confiscated as British property during the American Revolutionary War. A grist and saw mill had been established on the riverfront not far from the mansion by 1785.

The mansion is a rare combination of Federal architecture in the main mansion, and a later Victorian style addition.

White Bush was accepted into the National Register of Historic Places on December 10, 1980. It is alternately listed as the Archibald Shearer House. It is also listed in the Berkeley County Historical Society and the Berkeley County Historical Landmarks Commission Survey.
