= Jones Mill Run Historic District =

Historic district in West Virginia, United States

- U.S. National Register of Historic Places
- U.S. Historic district
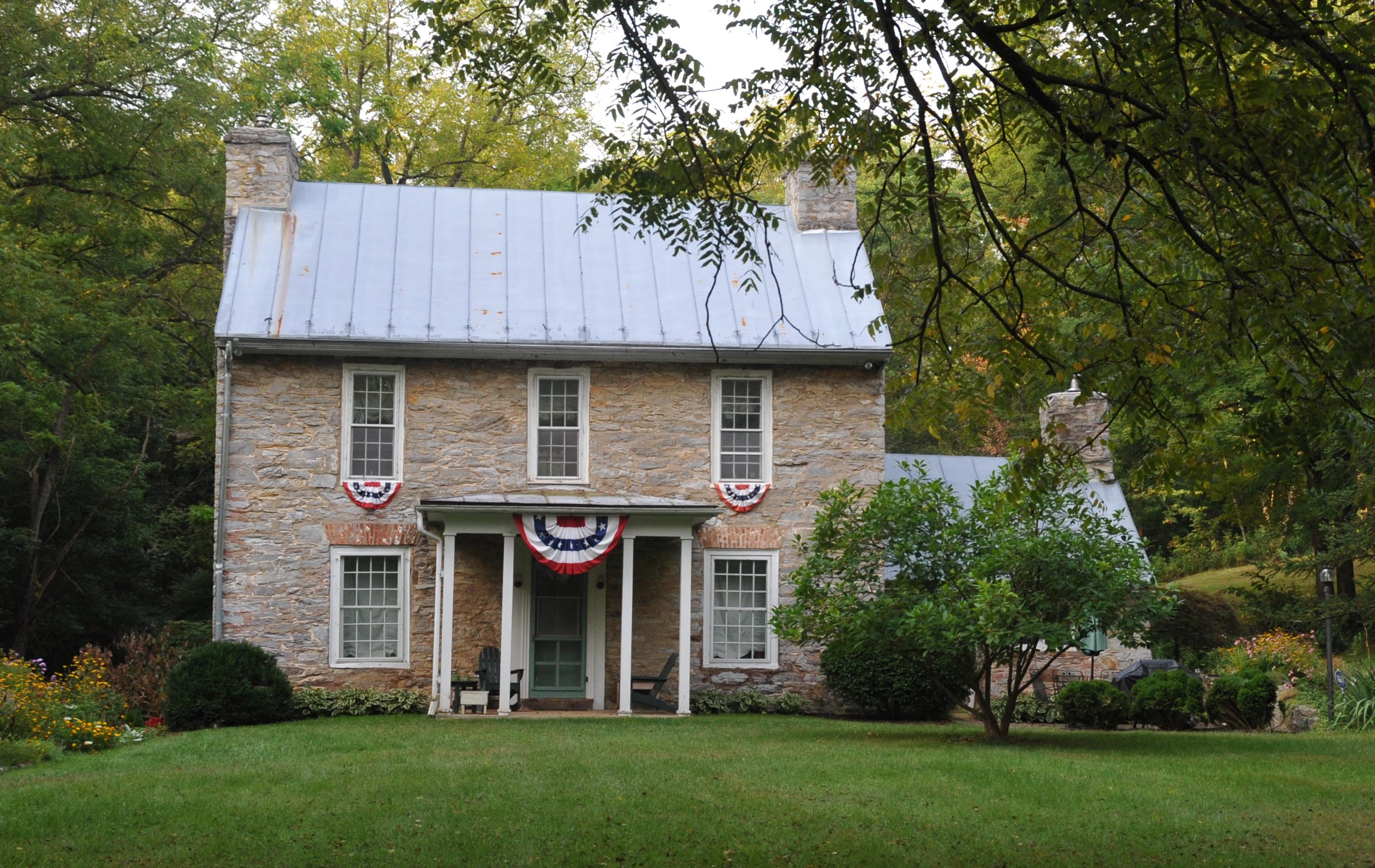
- The Thomas Swearington House, a colonial house that's part of the Jones Mill Run Historic District.

- Location within West Virginia Location within the United States
- Nearest city: Martinsburg, West Virginia
- Coordinates: 39°29′15″N 77°49′44″W
- Area: 9 acres (3.6 ha)
- Built: 1760
- Architectural style: Georgian
- MPS: Berkeley County MRA
- NRHP reference No.: 80004421
- Added to NRHP: December 10, 1980

Jones Mill Run Historic District is a national historic district located near Martinsburg, Berkeley County, West Virginia. It encompasses one contributing building, one contributing site, and two contributing structures. They are the Thomas Swearingen House (c. 1760); site of the mill, including the stone foundation and head and tail races; and the double stone bridge.

Thomas Swearingen House is a small limestone building in the Georgian style. Not only is it one of Berkeley County's oldest stone houses, but it has a unique fireplace that sits halfway out from the wall, rather than flat with the wall as with other stone houses in the county.

It is the site of the first mill in West Virginia, built before 1734. When John Vanmeter received a King's Patent for the land in 1734 in what was then Virginia, the mill was already built. The nine-acre site is on Jones Mill Run, a tributary of the Potomac River.

It was listed on the National Register of Historic Places in 1980.
