= Thomas Brown House (Inwood, West Virginia) =

Historic house in West Virginia, United States

- U.S. National Register of Historic Places
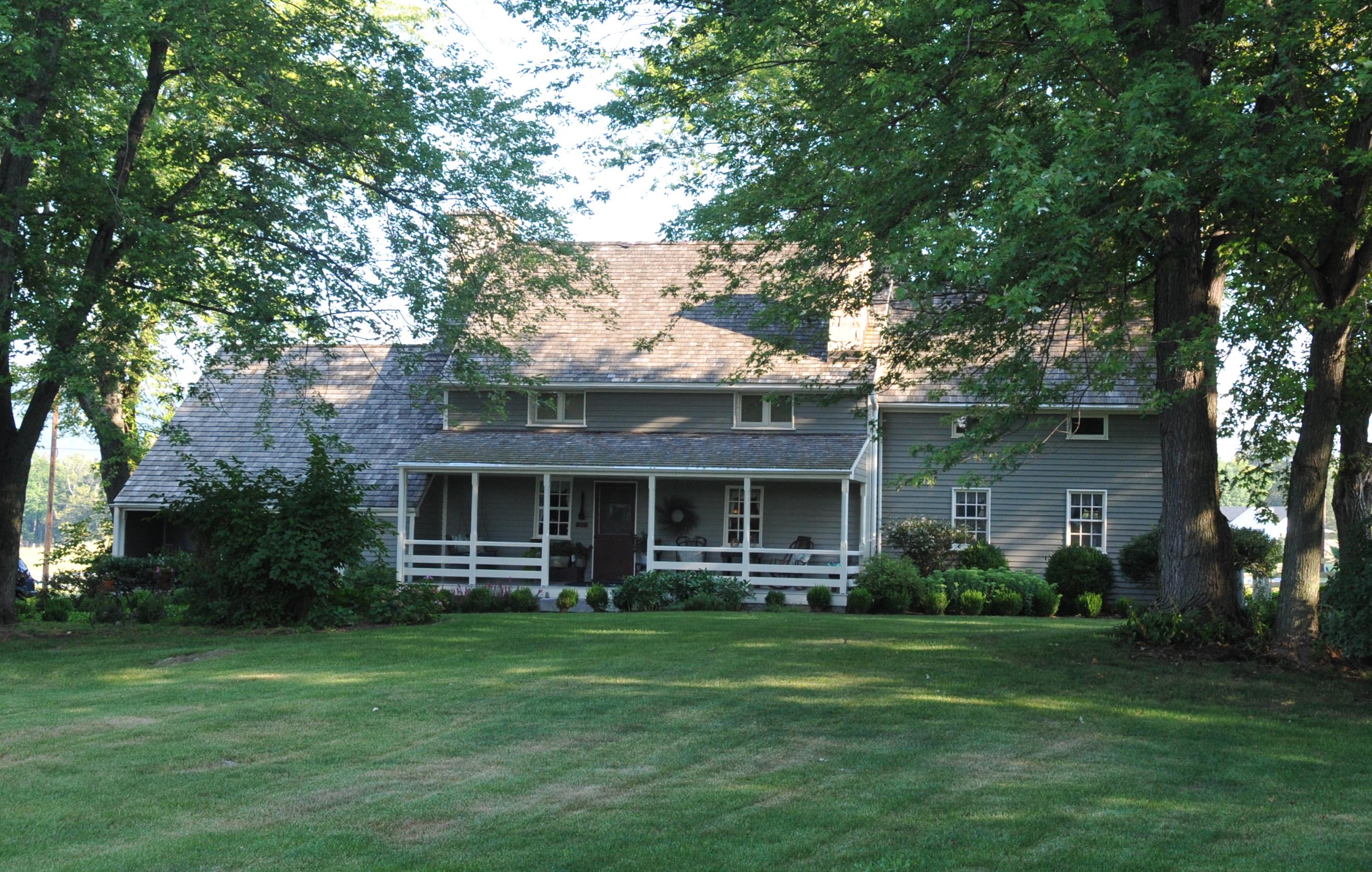

- Location within West Virginia Location within the United States
- Nearest city: Inwood, West Virginia
- Coordinates: 39°23′40″N 78°2′55″W
- Built: 1741
- Architect: Brown, Thomas
- Architectural style: Log house
- NRHP reference No.: 86000202
- Added to NRHP: January 16, 1986

The Thomas Brown House in Inwood, West Virginia, was built about 1741 as a log cabin for Thomas Brown, a Quaker farmer. Brown was one of the first to grow fruit in an area where orchardry would become a major agricultural industry. The house is the oldest known dwelling in Berkeley County.

Brown had assembled 1,200 acres (490 ha) in the area of Mill Creek, and left the log house and 60 acres (24 ha) to his wife Ruth on his death in 1750. A later resident on the property was Ellis Rees, who lived there from 1790 to 1820. The log house became a tenant house for 100 years, but was renovated beginning in 1983.

The house is built of large logs, 16 or 17 inches wide and hewn on two sides. The 1-1/2-story structure measures about 23 feet (7.0 m) by 29 feet (8.8 m) in the original block, a log west wing about 16 feet (4.9 m) by 21 feet (6.4 m), and a frame east wing about 16 feet (4.9 m) by 20 feet (6.1 m). The central block has two large stone chimneys. The logs are clad with weatherboards. The central block has two rooms downstairs. The wings are a single room downstairs and upstairs. The front and read elevations feature gun ports cut into the logs, high in the walls.

Also on the property are a log meat house, a stone springhouse and a frame privy. The house was placed on the National Register of Historic Places in 1986.
