= Spring Valley Farm =

Historic house in West Virginia, United States

- U.S. National Register of Historic Places
- Location within West Virginia Location within the United States
- Nearest city: Northeast of Union on U.S. Route 219, Union, West Virginia
- Coordinates: 37°41′1″N 80°27′30″W
- Area: 12.7 acres (5.1 ha)
- Built: 1793
- Architectural style: Federal
- NRHP reference No.: 74002017, 92000901
- Added to NRHP: December 30, 1974, boundary increase July 16, 1992

Spring Valley Farm, also known as the Richard Dickson Farm, is a historic home and farm located near Union, Monroe County, West Virginia, United States. The main house began as a two-story log cabin built in 1793. The main, or big, house was added to the original log unit between 1837 and 1841. It is a two-story building with large brick chimneys on either end of its gently sloping gable roof. The front facade features a two-story porch that extends the entire length of the main unit. The porch has plain white wood columns with a Chinese Chippendale style railing on the second floor. Also on the property are a variety of contributing outbuildings including the Shop and Root Cellar (c. 1840), 1834 Well, Smoke House or Meat House (1840), Granary (c. 1870), the Old Stable (c. 1780), Cattle Barn (c. 1905), Second Creek Fort Well (c. 1780), Horse Barn (1905), Old Garage (1930), Machine Shed (1915), and Old Log Building (c. 1800).

It was listed on the National Register of Historic Places in 1974, with a boundary increase in 1992.
