= Lilburn H. Snodgrass =

American politician

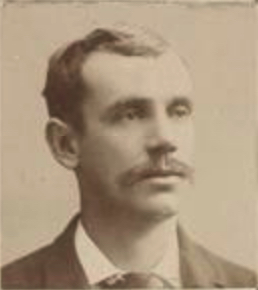

Member of the Virginia House of Delegates for Washington and Bristol
- In office December 2, 1891 – December 6, 1893 Serving with Charles W. Alderson
- Preceded by: James Crow
- Succeeded by: E. S. Kendrick

Personal details
- Born: Lilburn Henderson Snodgrass; May 18, 1859
- Died: March 9, 1930 (aged 70)
- Party: Democratic
- Spouse: Amanda Andis

Lilburn Henderson Snodgrass (May 18, 1859 – March 9, 1930) was an American politician who served in the Virginia House of Delegates.
