= John, David, and Jacob Rees House =

Historic house in West Virginia, United States

- U.S. National Register of Historic Places
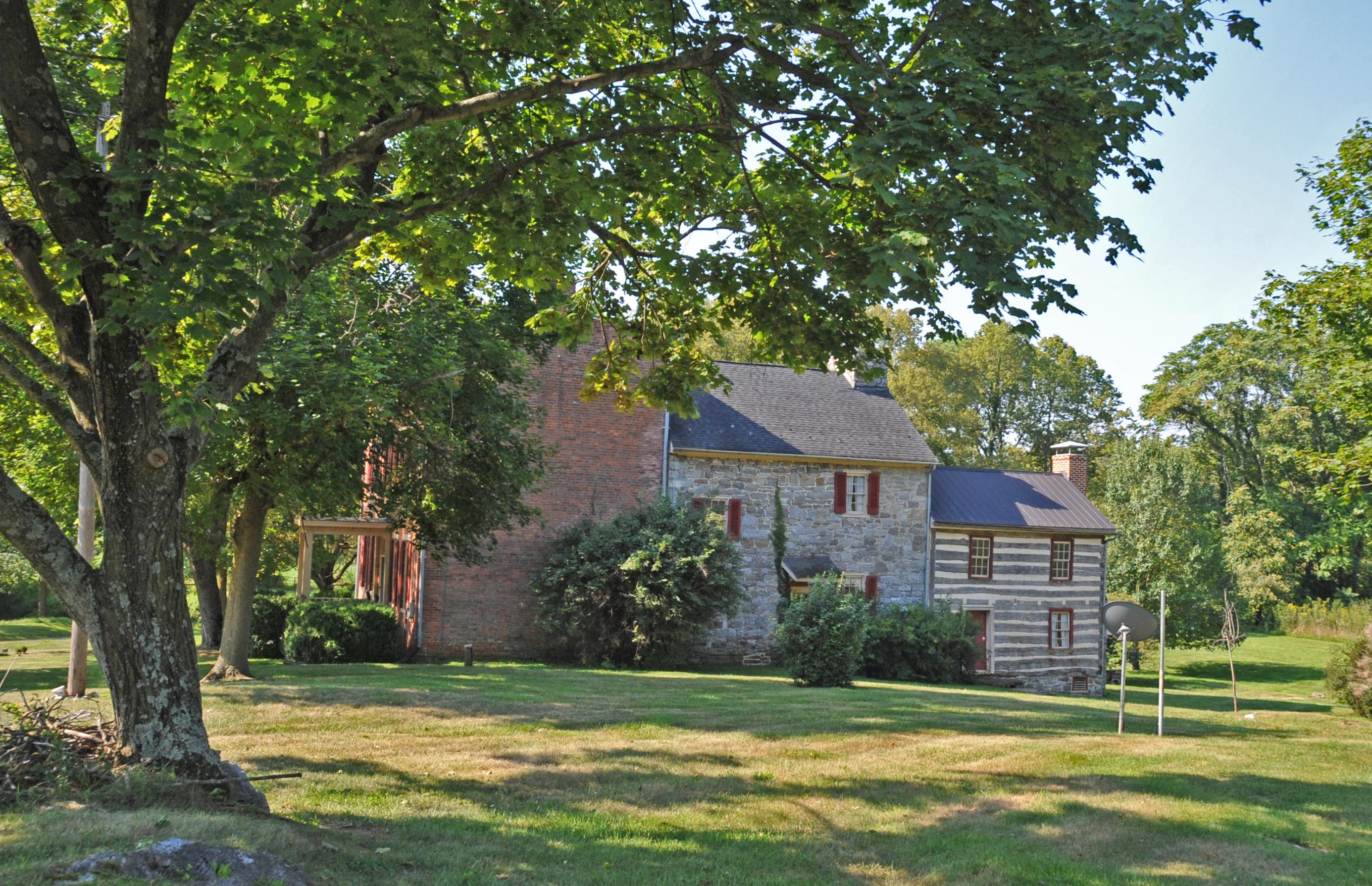
- 2009

- Location within West Virginia Location within the United States
- Location: Off U.S. Route 11, Bunker Hill, West Virginia
- Coordinates: 39°18′47″N 78°5′53″W
- Area: 3 acres (1.2 ha)
- Built: 1761, 1791, c. 1855
- Architect: John Rees, others
- Architectural style: Greek Revival, Federal
- NRHP reference No.: 84003495
- Added to NRHP: January 12, 1984

John, David, and Jacob Rees House, also known as Lefevre Farm, is a historic home located at Bunker Hill, Berkeley County, West Virginia. It is an L-shaped, log, stone-and-brick dwelling on a stone foundation. It measures 45 feet wide by 70 feet deep, and was built in three sections, the oldest, three-bay log section dating to about 1760. The two-story, three-bay rubble stone section is in the Federal style and built in 1791. The front section was built about 1855 and is a five-bay-wide, 2 1/2-story building in the Greek Revival style. Also on the property is a small stone spring house and log barn.

It was listed on the National Register of Historic Places in 1984.
