= Tuscarora Creek Historic District =

Historic district in West Virginia, United States

- U.S. National Register of Historic Places
- U.S. Historic district
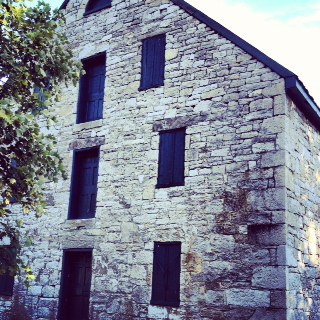
- Patterson's Mill (1765), September 2012

- Location within West Virginia Location within the United States
- Location: Roughly bounded by N. Tennessee Ave., south on Old Mill Rd., to County Route 15, near Martinsburg, West Virginia
- Coordinates: 39°28′10.5″N 77°58′8″W
- Area: 290 acres (120 ha)
- Architect: Multiple
- Architectural style: Italianate, Georgian, Federal
- MPS: Berkeley County MRA
- NRHP reference No.: 80004426
- Added to NRHP: December 10, 1980

Tuscarora Creek Historic District is a national historic district located near Martinsburg and Nollville, Berkeley County, West Virginia. It encompasses 31 contributing buildings and three contributing sites, related to the early settlement and economic development along the Tuscarora Creek. Notable buildings in the district include: Patterson's Mill (1765) and the miller's house, "Elm Dale," the Silber-Walters House, Huxley Hall, site of Patterson's New Mill and miller's house, Hibbard Mill, Tuscarora School, Providence Cemetery, the Mong House, Tuscarora Church (1802), James Noll Shop, Rumsey Mill site, and the poor house or "Mansion House" (1788).

It was listed on the National Register of Historic Places in 1980.
