= Prato Rio =

Historic house in West Virginia, United States

- U.S. National Register of Historic Places
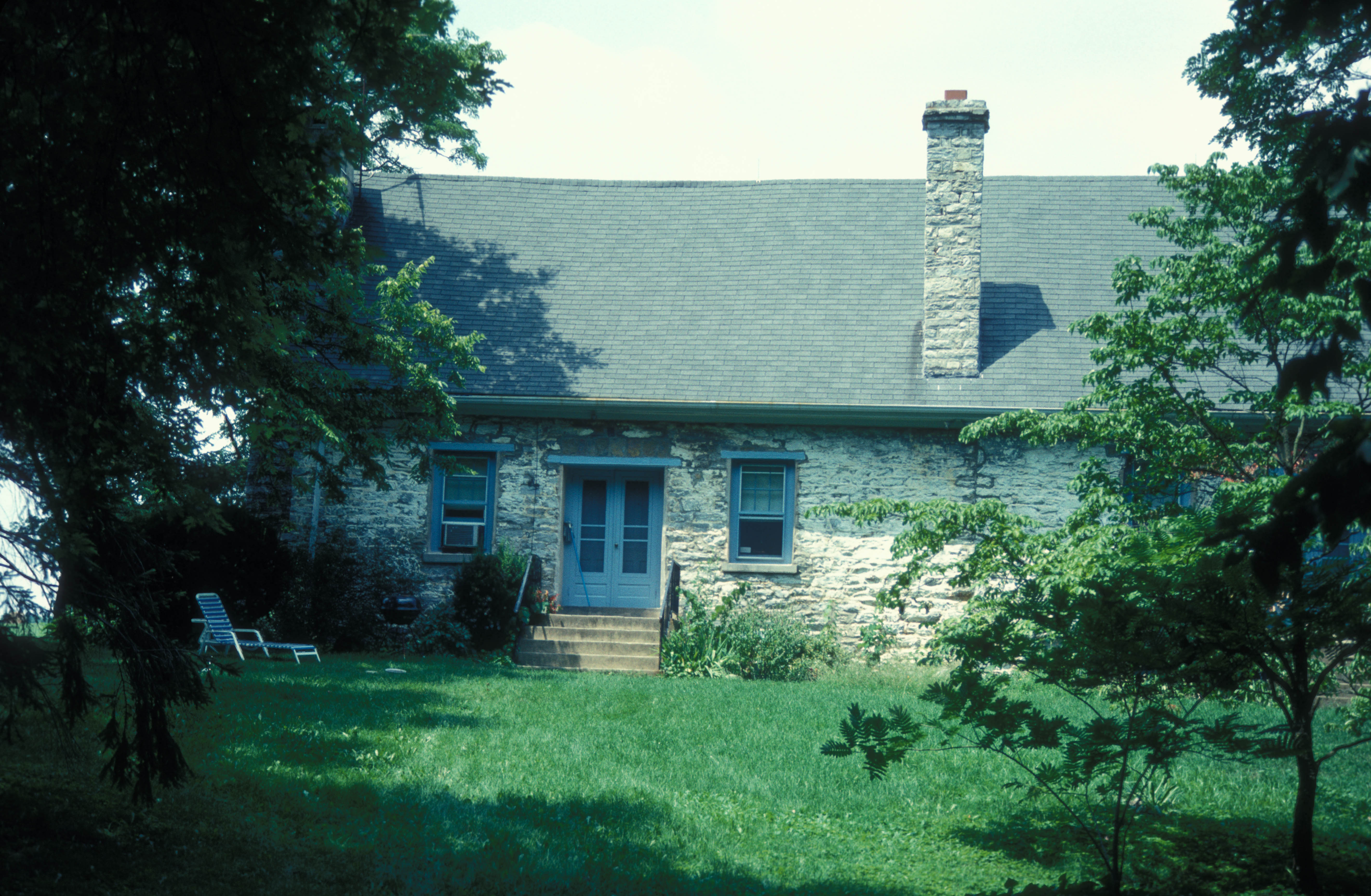

- Location within West Virginia Location within the United States
- Location: Leetown, West Virginia
- Coordinates: 39°20′49″N 77°56′12″W
- Built: 1775
- NRHP reference No.: 73001916
- Added to NRHP: April 11, 1973

Prato Rio, also known as Hopewell, near Leetown, West Virginia, was the home of General Charles Lee of the Continental Army, for whom Leetown is named. Lee lived there from 1774 to his death in 1782.

== Description ==
Han Yost Hite's original log cabin measured about 18 feet (5.5 m) square. His son's extension was a stone structure about 22 feet (6.7 m) by 33 feet (10 m), connected to the cabin by a 12-foot (3.7 m) link, using a hall-and-parlor plan. A second story was added to the log portion in the 19th century. Around 1820 the stone section was partitioned into four rooms, and in 1840 another stone addition was appended to the north end of the stone section.

== History ==
The property was originally acquired in 1731 by Han Yost Heydt (or Hite), who built a log cabin on the property he called "Hopewell". Heydt's son Jacob expanded the cabin in 1733. In 1774 Jacob Heydt sold the 3,000-acre (12 km^{2}) plantation to Lee, who renamed the estate "Prato Rio" (Portuguese, "Stream on the meadow"), but often referred to the house as "The Hut." Inhabiting the extension without partitions, Lee chalked the locations of where walls would have been had they existed. Lee used the log portion as a kitchen, where his servants lived in the loft. Lee lived as a hermit with his dogs, named Father, Son and Holy Ghost, complaining about organized religion and his treatment after his dismissal from the army. After Lee's death the house was further enlarged.

The acreage adjoining the house also had many springs, as indicated by the name Lee chose for his estate. In the early 1930s, the federal government acquired that land and built a coldwater fish hatchery, now operated by the U.S. Geological Survey as the Leetown Science Center, and the U.S.G.S. east coast regional office.

== See also ==
- List of the oldest buildings in West Virginia
