= Strider Farm =

Historic house in West Virginia, United States

- U.S. National Register of Historic Places
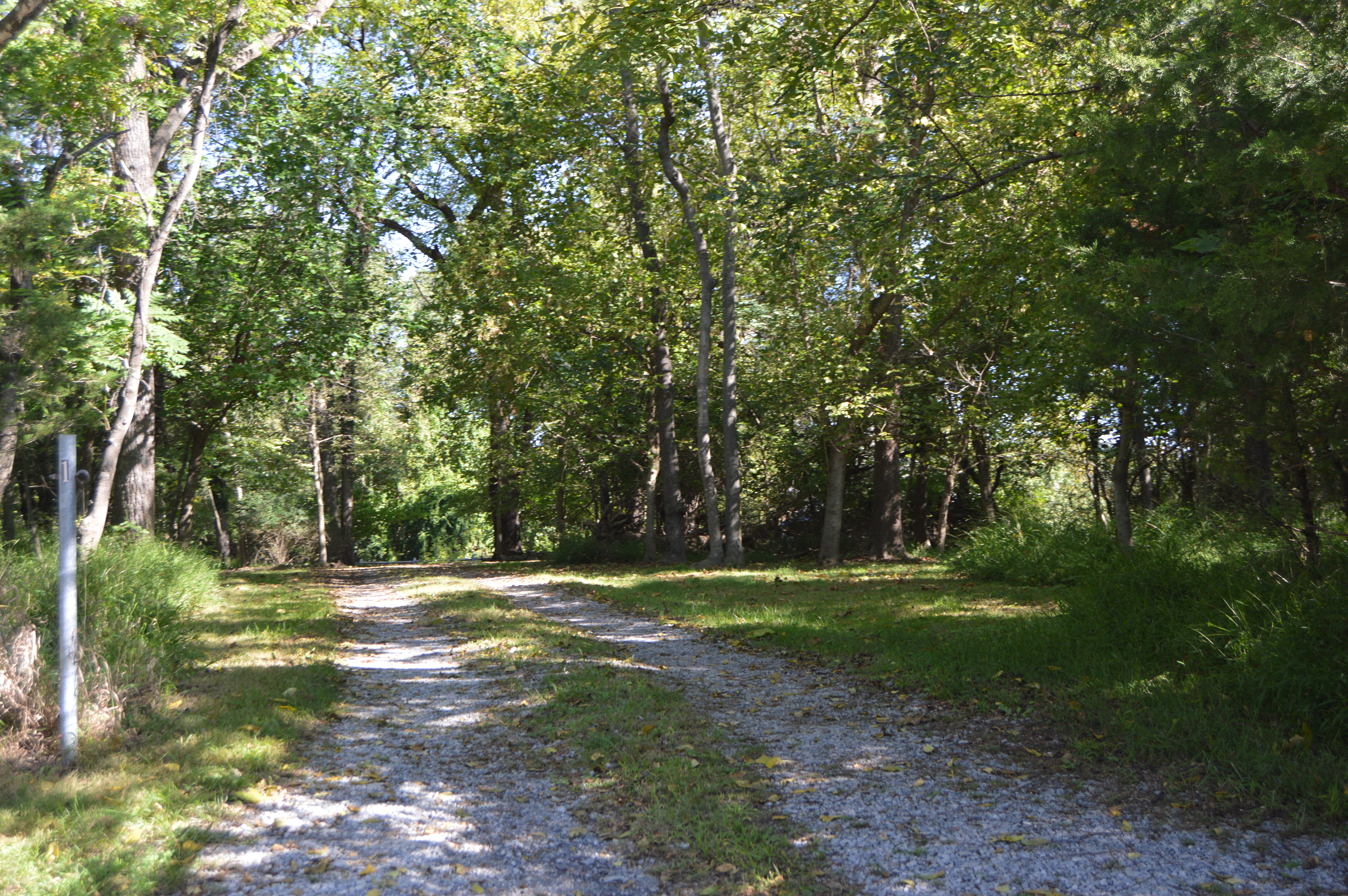
- Property entrance

- Location within West Virginia Location within the United States
- Location: Jefferson County, West Virginia
- Nearest city: Harpers Ferry, West Virginia
- Coordinates: 39°20′3″N 77°45′55″W
- Built: 1790
- Architectural style: Federal
- NRHP reference No.: 87002524
- Added to NRHP: February 1, 1988

The Strider Farm was intimately involved in events concerning the American Civil War near Harpers Ferry, West Virginia. Located on a small hill just south of the Baltimore and Ohio Railroad line from Baltimore and Washington, D.C. to Martinsburg, West Virginia, the Strider farm was a strategic location for the control of this vital link.

The main house, built circa 1790 is a 2 1/2-story Federal style in stone masonry. It was enlarged in 1880 with a shallow addition, also in stone. A barn also dates to 1880.

The main house was built by Philip Strider, whose descendants appear frequently in the later history of Jefferson County. During the Civil War, the property was the scene of frequent fighting. On September 13–17, 1862, Confederate artillery fired on Federal troops from a position near the front yard of the house. Later, in 1864, the house was the headquarters of Federal Major General Horatio G. Wright.
