= Robert Worthington House =

Historic house in West Virginia, United States

- U.S. National Register of Historic Places
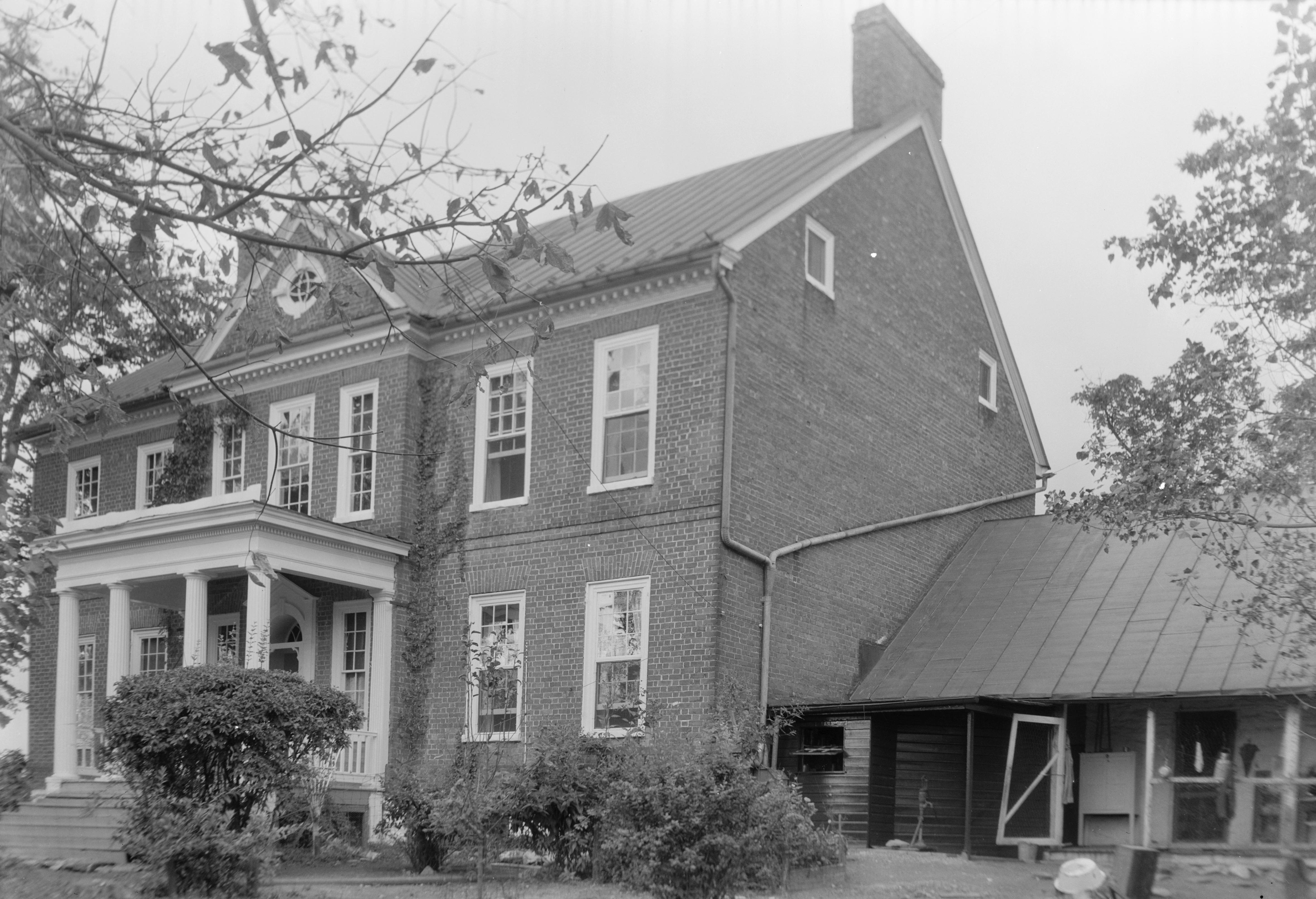
- Front of the house

- Location within West Virginia Location within the United States
- Nearest city: Charles Town, West Virginia
- Coordinates: 39°17′46″N 77°53′23″W
- Built: 1735
- Architectural style: Georgian
- NRHP reference No.: 73001913
- Added to NRHP: July 2, 1973

The Robert Worthington House, also known as Piedmont and Quarry Banks, is an historic house located near Charles Town, West Virginia. The main house was constructed as an addition in 1784 to the original structure, which dates to circa 1735, built by Robert Worthington, who called the house "Quarry Banks - New Style" after his original home, "Quarry Banks" in England. Worthington's grandson, Thomas Worthington, eventually became the sixth governor of Ohio.

The Georgian style addition was built by Dr. John Briscoe. The house remains in the Briscoe family.
