= Stone House Mansion =

Historic house in West Virginia, United States

- U.S. National Register of Historic Places
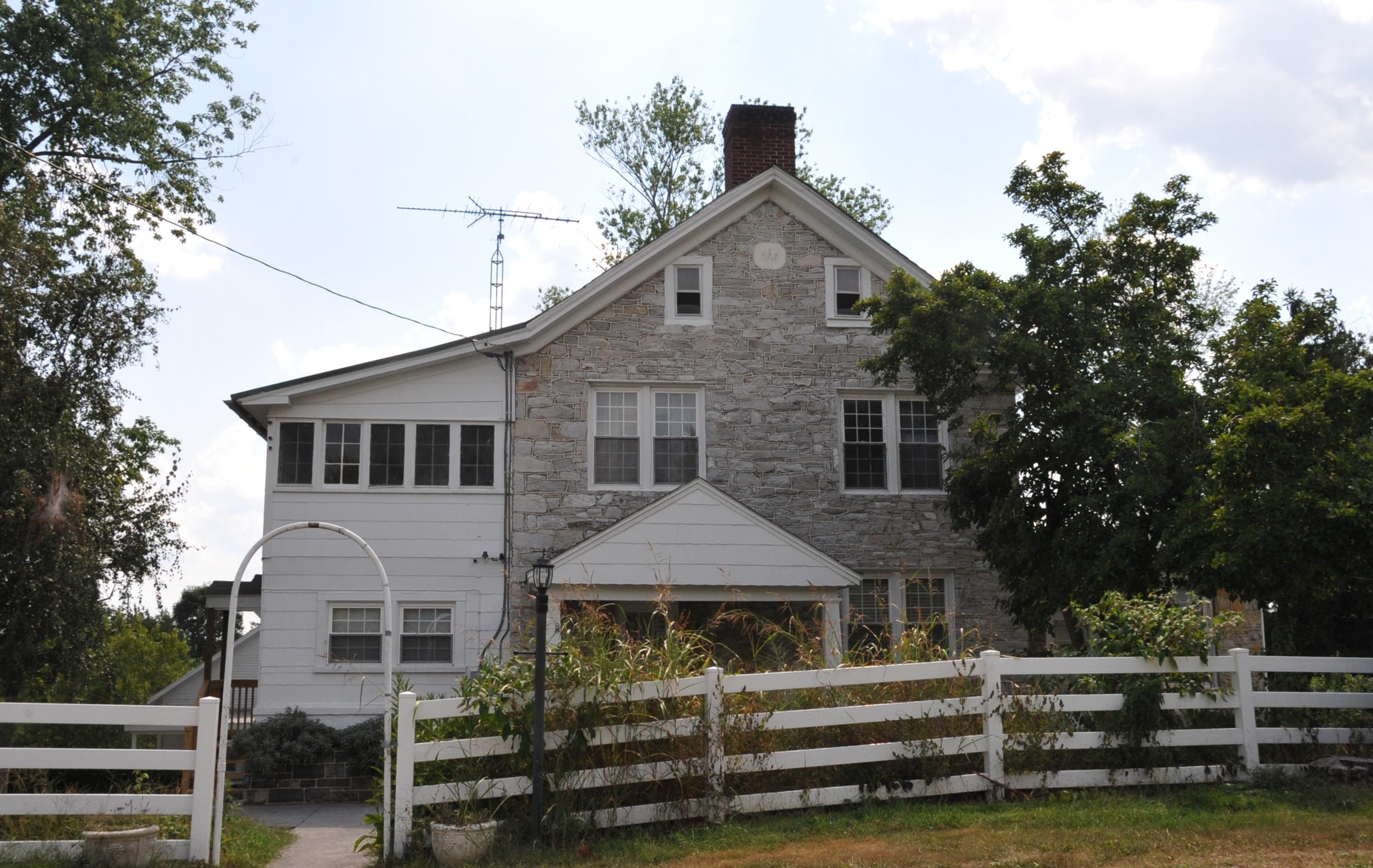

- Location within West Virginia Location within the United States
- Location: Off WV 9, SE of Martinsburg, Martinsburg, West Virginia
- Coordinates: 39°23′52″N 77°55′9″W
- Area: 0.8 acres (0.32 ha)
- Built: 1757
- Architectural style: Georgian
- NRHP reference No.: 94001297
- Added to NRHP: November 21, 1994

Stone House Mansion, also known as the John Strode House, is a historic home located near Martinsburg, Berkeley County, West Virginia. The main house was built in 1757, and is a two-story, stone house with a slate gable roof. Porches were added during the 20th century. Also on the property is a stuccoed brick ice house (c. 1900), bunk house (1911), and a barn / garage (c. 1910).

It was listed on the National Register of Historic Places in 1994.
