= Renick Farm (Renick, West Virginia) =

Historic house in West Virginia, United States

- U.S. National Register of Historic Places
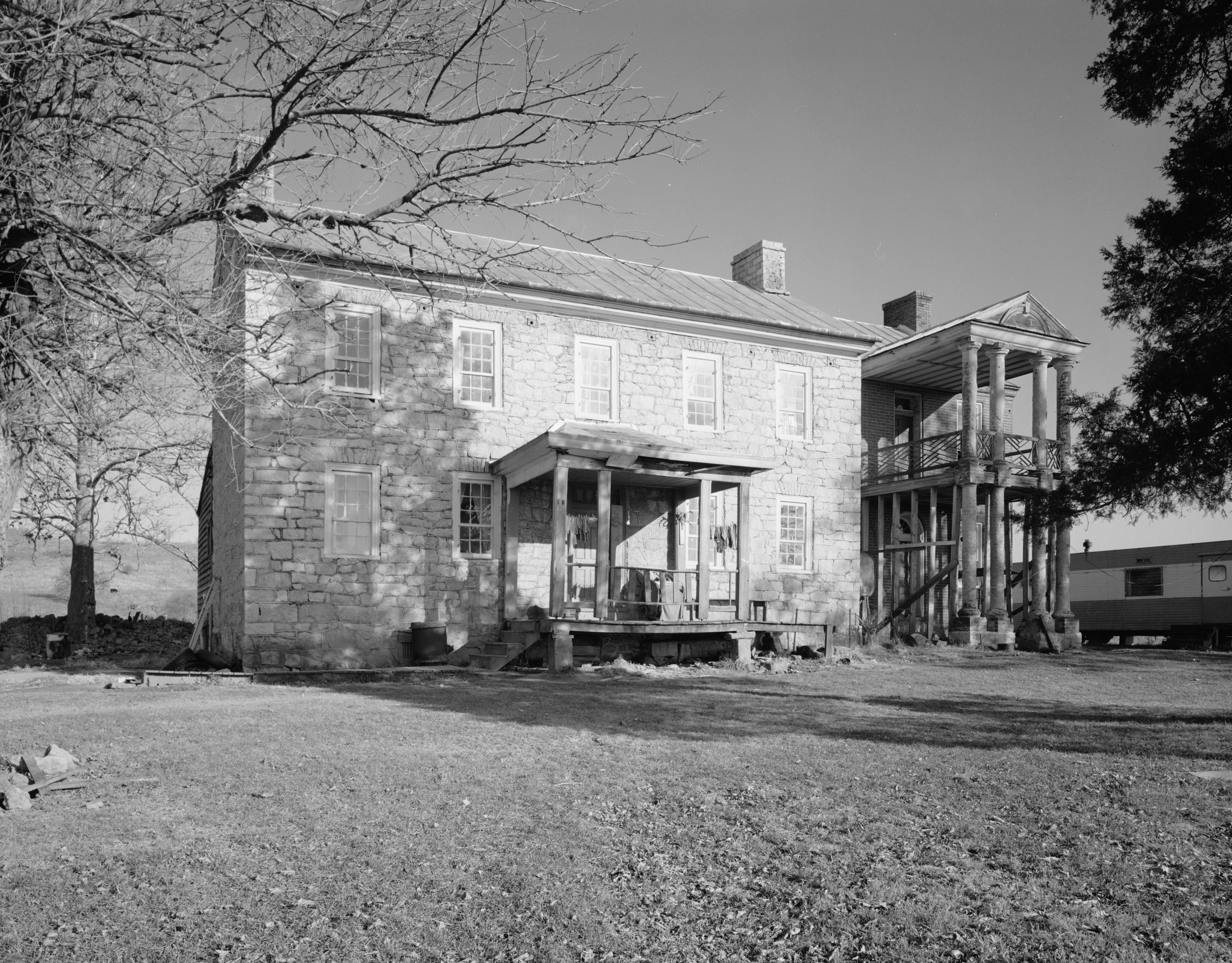
- Renick Farmhouse, 1974

- Location within West Virginia Location within the United States
- Location: US 219, near jct. of WV 9 and US 219, near Renick, West Virginia
- Coordinates: 37°59′0″N 80°21′4″W
- Area: 9.2 acres (3.7 ha)
- Built: 1792
- Built by: Foglesong, Christopher; Burgess, Conrad
- Architectural style: Georgian, Federal
- NRHP reference No.: 96000525
- Added to NRHP: April 4, 1997

Renick Farm, also known as the William Renick Farm, is an historic home located near Renick, Greenbrier County, West Virginia. The farmhouse was built between 1787 and 1792, and is a two-story, limestone dwelling with a gable roof in the Georgian style. A brick Federal style addition was built in 1825, and it features a two-story, temple form entrance portico with Doric order columns and Chinese Chippendale railings. Also on the property are a contributing barn (1901) and smoke house (c. 1840).

It was listed on the National Register of Historic Places in 1997.
