= Darkesville, West Virginia =

Unincorporated community in West Virginia, United States

- Darkesville Historic District
- U.S. National Register of Historic Places
- U.S. Historic district
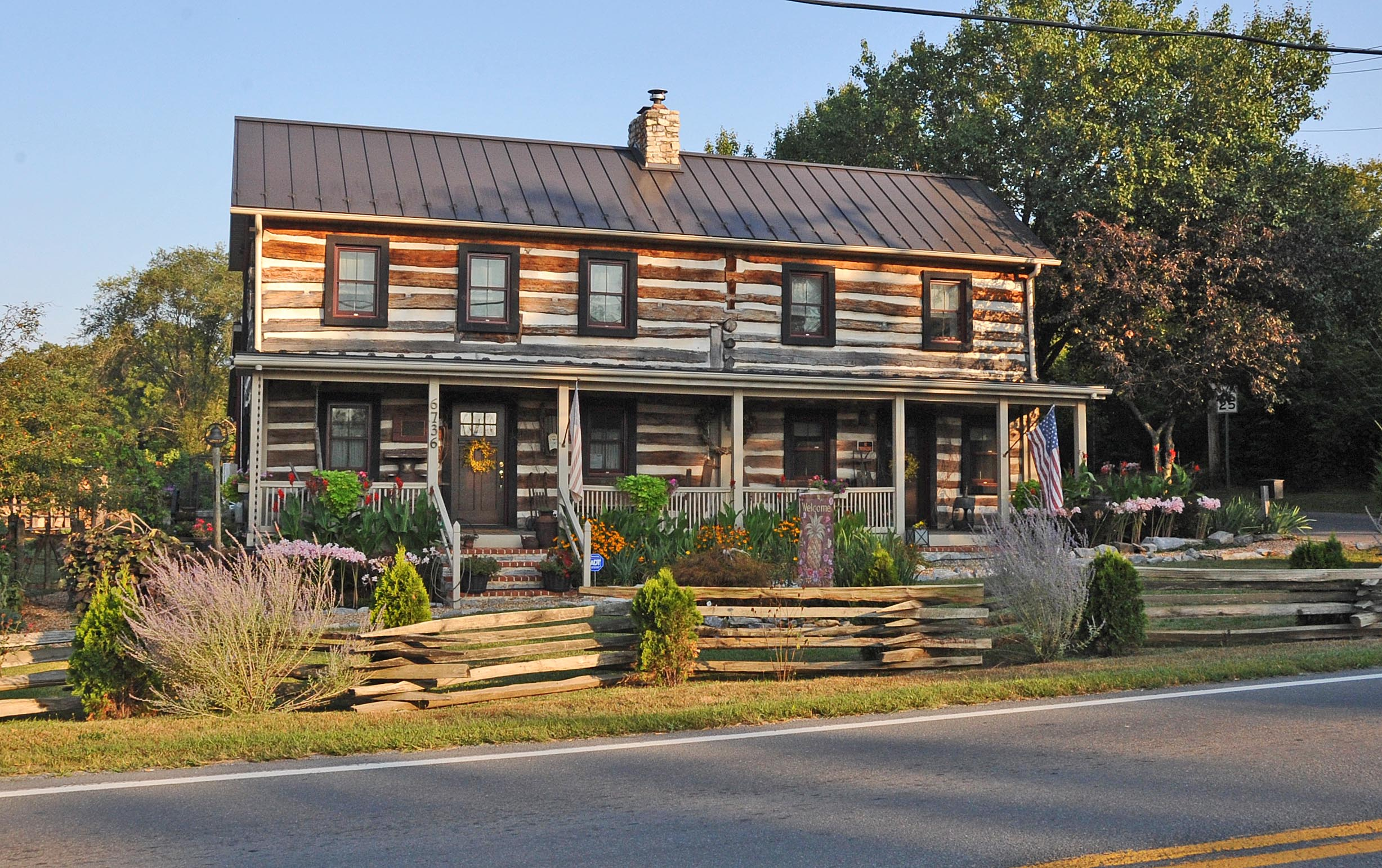

- Location within West Virginia Location within the United States
- Location: US 11 at Middle Creek, Darkesville, West Virginia
- Coordinates: 39°22′27″N 78°1′25″W
- Architect: Multiple
- Architectural style: Greek Revival, Gothic, Federal
- MPS: Berkeley County MRA
- NRHP reference No.: 80004410
- Added to NRHP: December 10, 1980

Darkesville is an unincorporated community in Berkeley County, West Virginia, United States. Established in 1791, Darkesville has been nationally recognized as a historic district.

A post office and school (now closed) once operated in Darkesville.

== Geography ==
Darkesville lies between Inwood and Martinsburg along U.S. Route 11. The community's elevation is 535 feet (163 m), and it is located at 39°22′25″N 78°1′30″W.

Middle Creek flows through the center of Darkesville.

== Name ==
Established by an act of the Virginia General Assembly on December 7, 1791, on the property of James Buckells, Darkesville is named for William Darke, a Virginia military officer who had his headquarters in the community. Historically, Darkesville has been known by various names and a wide variety of spellings. An 1895 atlas showed the community as "Buckletown", and later variants included "Buckellstown", "Buckels Town", "Buckelstown", "Buckle Town" and "Bucklestown", all referring to the entrepreneurial James Buckles (1732-1796) who contributed land and laid out the town in 1790. "James Town" and "Locke" have also been applied to the community. Its current name has also been spelled "Darkes" and "Darkville".

== Historic district ==
In 1980, the community was listed on the National Register of Historic Places as a historic district. Darkesville was recognized for its historic architecture, which includes approximately twenty-five buildings constructed as log cabins in 1810 or earlier.

== External sources ==
"Darkesville: A Name Born of Tragedy," 8thVirginia.com (Gabriel Neville)
