= William Davis Snodgrass =

Presbyterian clergyman

Reverend Rev. William Davis Sodgrass
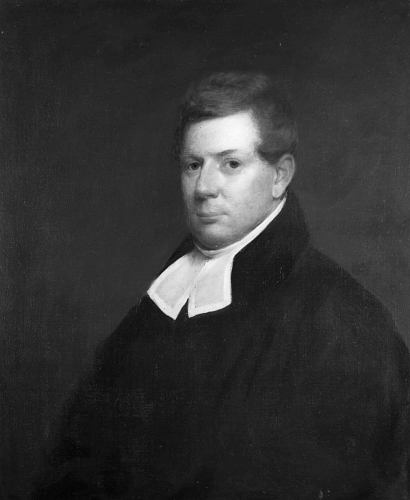
- Snodgrass in 1822. Painting by Nathaniel Jocelyn, 1796–1881; courtesy of Presbyterian Historical Society
- Born: 30 June, 1796; West Hanover, Pennsylvania, United States
- Died: 28 May, 1885; Goshen, New York
- Education: Washington College, Pennsylvania; Princeton Theological Seminary, Princeton, New Jersey
- Occupation: Presbyterian Cleric

William Davis Sodgrass (30 June, 1796 – 28 May, 1885) was an American Presbyterian clergyman, president of the board of trustees of Princeton Theological Seminary.

Snodgrass was born in West Hanover, Pennsylvania. He was the son of the Reverend James Snodgrass, who from 1784 until his death in 1846 was pastor of the Presbyterian church in West Hanover. After graduation at Washington College, Pennsylvania, in 1815, and at Princeton Theological Seminary in 1818, he held Presbyterian pastorates in the south until 1823, when he was called to New York City.

From 1834 until 1844 he was pastor of a Presbyterian church in Troy, New York, after which he established the Fifteenth Street Church in New York City, serving as its pastor in 1846–1849. From 1849 until his death he was pastor in Goshen, New York. In 1830 he became a director of Princeton Theological Seminary, and he was president of its board of trustees in 1868. Columbia University gave him the degree of D.D. in 1830.

He published a discourse on the death of Reverend John M. Mason (New York, 1830), Perfectionism, Lectures on Apostolic Succession (1844), and several other discourses. He died in Goshen, New York.
