= Leetown, West Virginia =

- Unincorporated community
- Location within West Virginia Location within the United States
- Coordinates: 39°20′54″N 77°56′1″W
- Country: United States
- State: West Virginia
- County: Jefferson
- Time zone: UTC-5 (Eastern (EST))
  - Summer (DST): UTC-4 (EDT)
- GNIS feature ID: 1554937

Leetown is an unincorporated community in Jefferson County in the U.S. state of West Virginia. It lies along West Virginia Secondary Route 1 at its junction with Leetown Pike.

An early historical distinction of the town is the interesting confluence of the estates of three British born, British colonial military officers who served under General Braddock and were all involved in the disastrous British operations against French and Indian forces at Fort Duquesne (modern Pittsburgh) and who later became American revolutionary officers under George Washington.

The town is named for the eccentric General Charles Lee, a British officer. He was born in Cheshire in 1732 and purchased an estate in Virginia in 1774. He called the estate "Prato Rio" and the main house rests today just south of town. Major General Adam Stephen established a hunting lodge “The Bower” in 1750 one mile west of Leetown along Opequon Creek. Their mutual Revolutionary War colleague General Horatio Gates, the victor of the Battle of Saratoga, lived four miles north of town in the estate "Traveler’s Rest".

St. Bartholomew’s Episcopal Church is an attractive feature of Leetown. It was consecrated in 1846 as part of the recovery of the Episcopal Church in (then) Virginia after its low ebb in the years after the Revolution. The church was badly damaged during the Civil War.

The town is featured in the documentation of the general ebb and flow of forces during the Civil War. On July 3, 1864 a running battle took place through the town in which troops under Lieutenant General Jubal Early, after initial setback, prevailed over Federal forces. The victory cleared the way for Early’s entry into Maryland as part of the third and last Confederate invasion of the North, culminating in a Pyrrhic victory at Monocacy Junction near Frederick, Maryland on July 8.

After the conflict, the artist David English Henderson resided in Leetown, rendering on canvas his memories as a soldier in the Army of Northern Virginia.
