= Hedgesville, West Virginia =

- Town
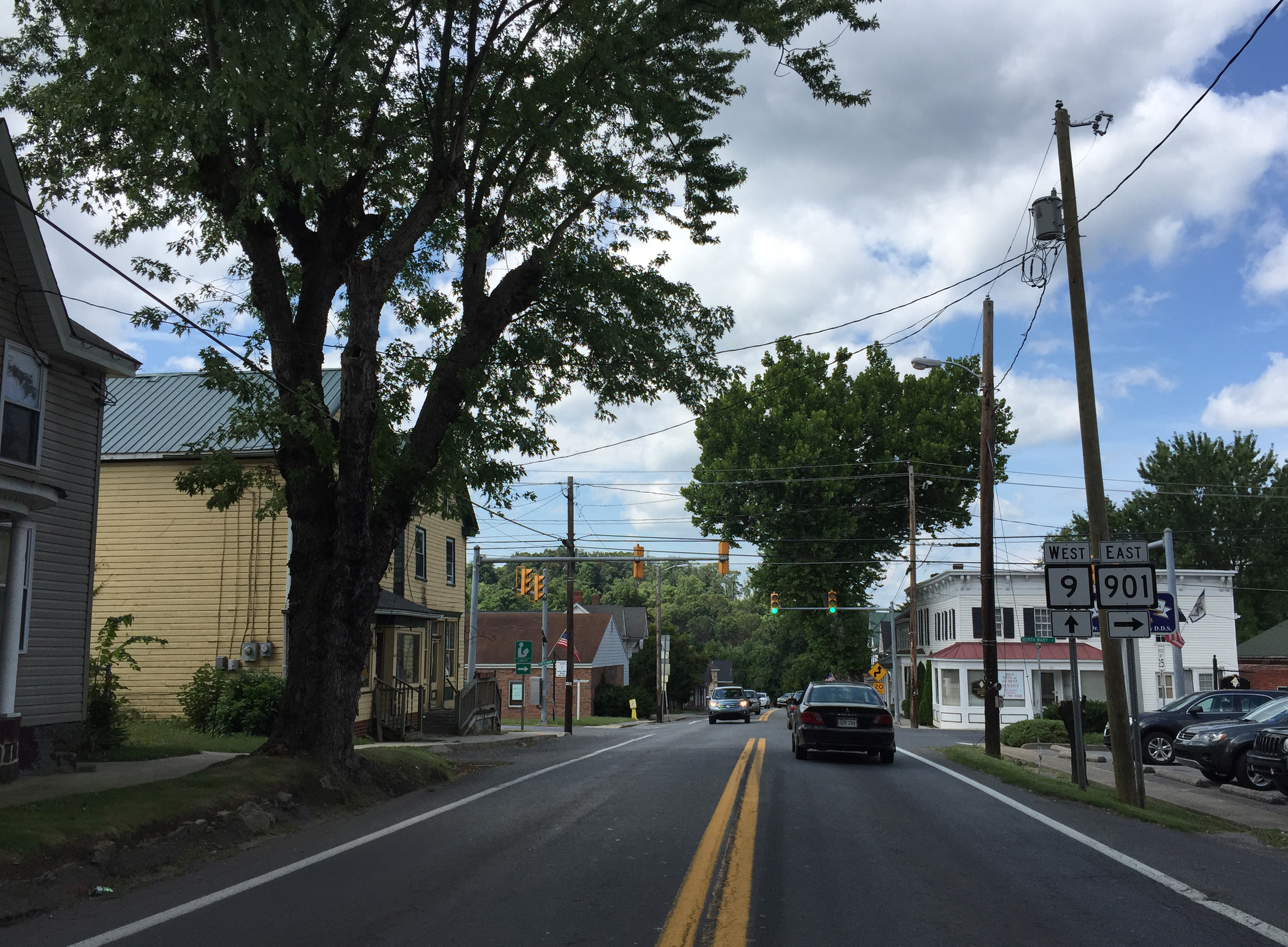
- Central Hedgesville

- Location of Hedgesville in Berkeley County, West Virginia.
- Coordinates: 39°33′16″N 77°59′40″W
- Country: United States
- State: West Virginia
- County: Berkeley
- Platted: 1830
- Incorporated: 1854

Area
  - Total: 0.13 sq mi (0.34 km^{2})
  - Land: 0.13 sq mi (0.34 km^{2})
  - Water: 0 sq mi (0.00 km^{2})
- Elevation: 633 ft (193 m)

Population (2020)
  - Total: 300
  - Density: 2,259.5/sq mi (872.39/km^{2})
- Time zone: UTC-5 (Eastern (EST))
  - Summer (DST): UTC-4 (EDT)
- ZIP code: 25427
- Area code: 304
- FIPS code: 54-36220
- GNIS feature ID: 2390239
- Website: https://www.hedgesvillewv.us/

Hedgesville is a town in Berkeley County, West Virginia, United States, in the state's Eastern Panhandle region. The population was 300 at the 2020 census. The town sits on West Virginia Route 9, roughly 13 miles (21 km) east of Berkeley Springs. In addition to its legal definition, Hedgesville has come to be the common name for the large and sparsely inhabited area of West Virginia's Eastern Panhandle that is bordered to the north and east by the Potomac River, to the south by an imaginary line from the city of Martinsburg to the tip of Virginia, and to the west by Berkeley Springs.

== History ==
Until the 18th century, the area was home to the Tuscarora people. The Hedgesville area was subsequently settled by William Snodgrass, who arrived in the American colonies in 1700. Snodgrass was buried in the cemetery of Tuscarora Presbyterian Church in what is now Berkeley County, West Virginia.

Officially established by an act of the Virginia General Assembly on February 11, 1836, the Town of Hedgesville was laid out in 1832 along the old Warm Springs Road (now West Virginia Route 9) and named for the prominent local Hedges family. In 1854, Hedgesville was officially incorporated by the General Assembly. The act of incorporation provided for a town council consisting of seven trustees, but the act was amended in 1858 so that a mayor could be added to the council. Hedgesville Historic District was listed on the U.S. National Register of Historic Places in 1980.

== Schools ==
- Hedgesville Elementary
- Tomahawk Intermediate
- Hedgesville Middle School
- Hedgesville High School

== Transportation ==
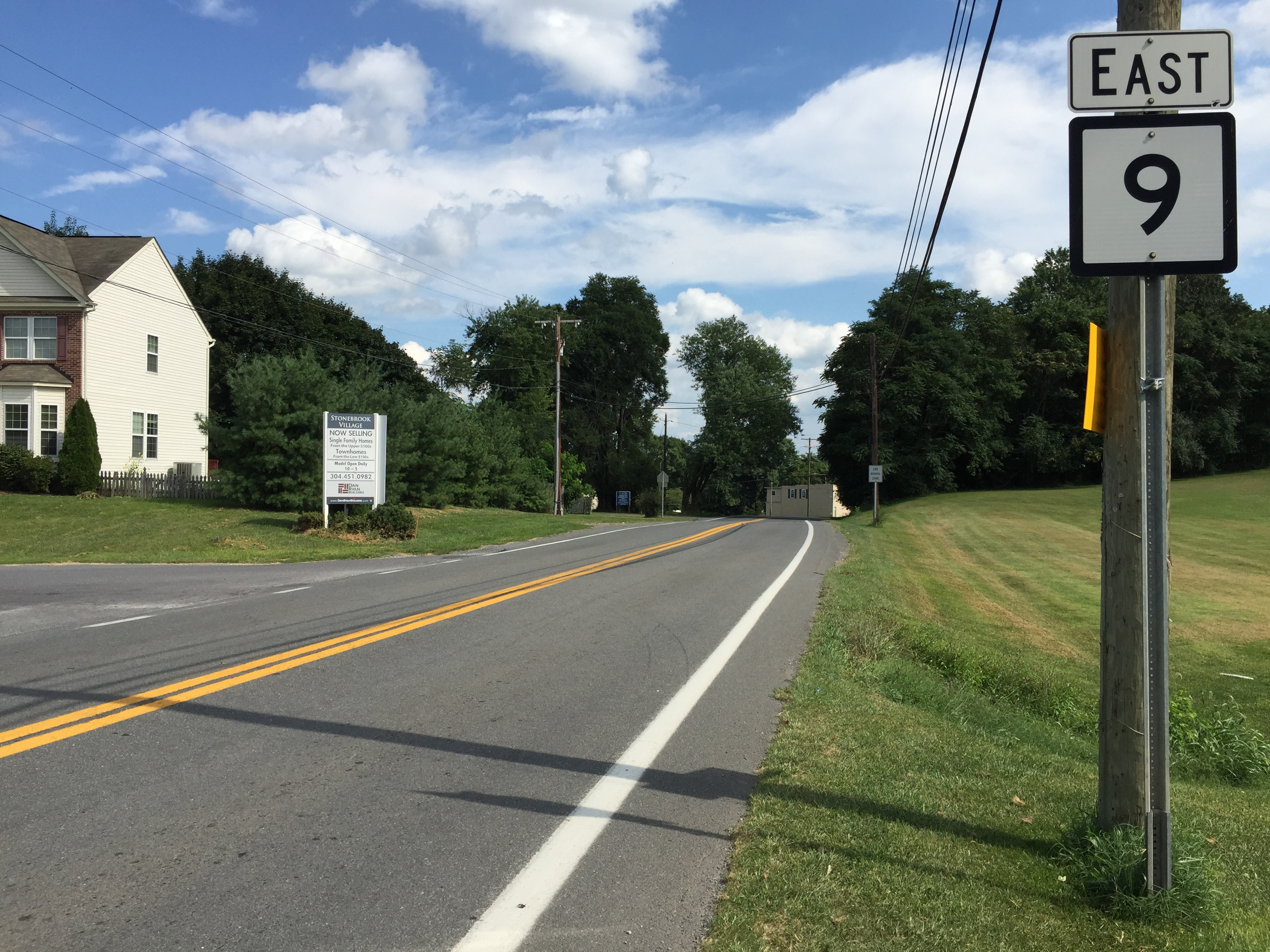
WV 9 eastbound, leaving Hedgesville

Two primary highways serve Hedgesville. The more prominent of these is West Virginia Route 9. WV 9 travels southeastward to Martinsburg and provides connections to Interstate 81. To the northwest, WV 9 connects to U.S. Route 522 in Berkeley Springs. The other primary highway serving Hedgesville is West Virginia Route 901, which heads east from its western end at WV 9 in Hedgesville to I-81 at Falling Waters.

== Geography ==
According to the United States Census Bureau, the town has a total area of 0.13 square miles (0.34 km^{2}), all land.

== Demographics ==
Historical population
Census	Pop.	Note	%±
1880	383		—
1890	448		17.0%
1900	342		−23.7%
1910	328		−4.1%
1920	379		15.5%
1930	361		−4.7%
1940	403		11.6%
1950	419		4.0%
1960	342		−18.4%
1970	274		−19.9%
1980	217		−20.8%
1990	227		4.6%
2000	240		5.7%
2010	318		32.5%
2020	300		−5.7%
U.S. Decennial Census

=== 2010 census ===
As of the census of 2010, there were 318 people, 119 households, and 82 families living in the town. The population density was 2,446.2 inhabitants per square mile (944.5/km^{2}). There were 135 housing units at an average density of 1,038.5 units per square mile (401.0 units/km^{2}). The racial makeup of the town was 90.3% White, 5.3% African American, 0.3% Native American, 0.3% Asian, 1.6% from other races, and 2.2% from two or more races. Hispanic or Latino of any race were 3.1% of the population.

There were 119 households, of which: 46.2% had children under the age of 18 living with them; 42.9% were married couples living together; 21.0% had a female householder with no husband present; 5.0% had a male householder with no wife present; and, 31.1% were non-families. 16.0% of all households were made up of individuals, and 5.9% had someone living alone who was 65 years of age or older. The average household size was 2.67, and the average family size was 3.07.

The median age in the town was 31.2 years. 29.6% of residents were under the age of 18; 9% were between the ages of 18 and 24; 32.4% were from 25 to 44; 20.1% were from 45 to 64; and 8.8% were 65 years of age or older. The gender makeup of the town was 47.2% male and 52.8% female.

=== 2000 census ===
As of the census of 2000, there were 240 people, 88 households, and 65 families living in the town. The population density was 772.2 people/km^{2} (2,000 people/mi^{2}). There were 99 housing units at an average density of 816.9 units per square mile (315.4 units/km^{2}). The racial makeup of the town was 92.08% White, 3.75% African American, 0.42% Native American, 0.42% Pacific Islander, and 3.33% from two or more races. Hispanic or Latino of any race were 0.83% of the population.

There were 88 households, of which 43.2% had children under the age of 18 living with them, 46.6% were married couples living together, 20.5% had a female householder with no husband present, and 26.1% were non-families. 20.5% of all households were made up of individuals, and 5.7% had someone living alone who was 65 years of age or older. The average household size was 2.73 and the average family size was 3.18.

In the town, the population was spread out, with 34.6% under the age of 18, 6.3% from 18 to 24, 27.5% from 25 to 44, 24.6% from 45 to 64, and 7.1% who were 65 years of age or older. The median age was 34 years. For every 100 females, there were 75.2 males. For every 100 females age 18 and over, there were 80.5 males.

The median income for a household in the town was $49,375, and the median income for a family was $46,563. Males had a median income of $31,042 versus $21,985 for females. The per capita income for the town was $17,772. About 2.8% of families and 5.4% of the population were below the poverty line, including 9.3% of those under the age of eighteen and 9.7% of those 65 or over.

== Notable people ==
- Andy Boarman — bluegrass and folk musician
- Gale Catlett — basketball player and coach
- Chase DeLauter — professional baseball player
- James G. Leyburn (1902–1993) — American sociologist, author, and professor
- David O'Brien Martin — former US Congressman
