= List of plantations in West Virginia =

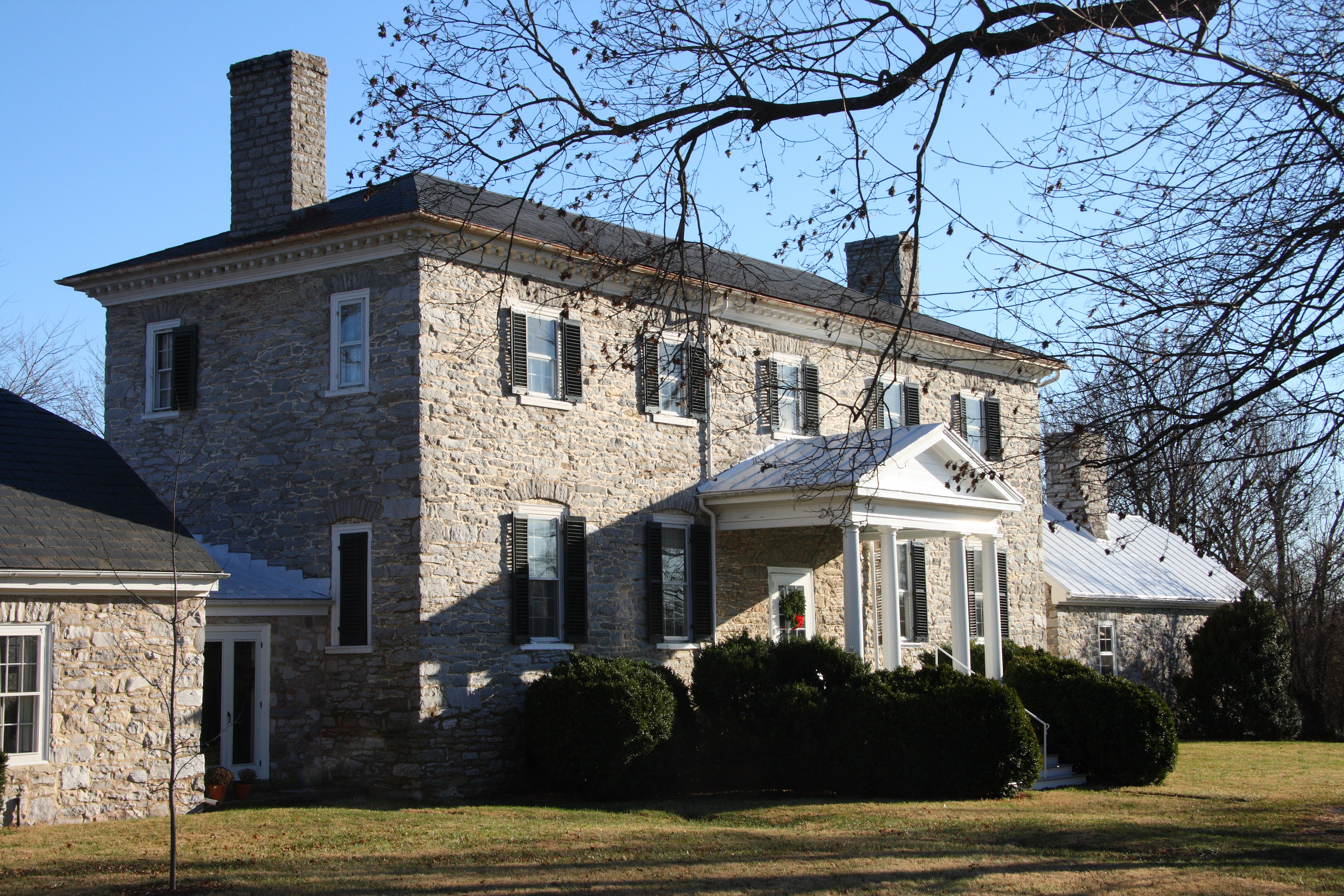
Harewood (1770) was designed by John Ariss and built by George Washington's brother Samuel Washington in Jefferson County.

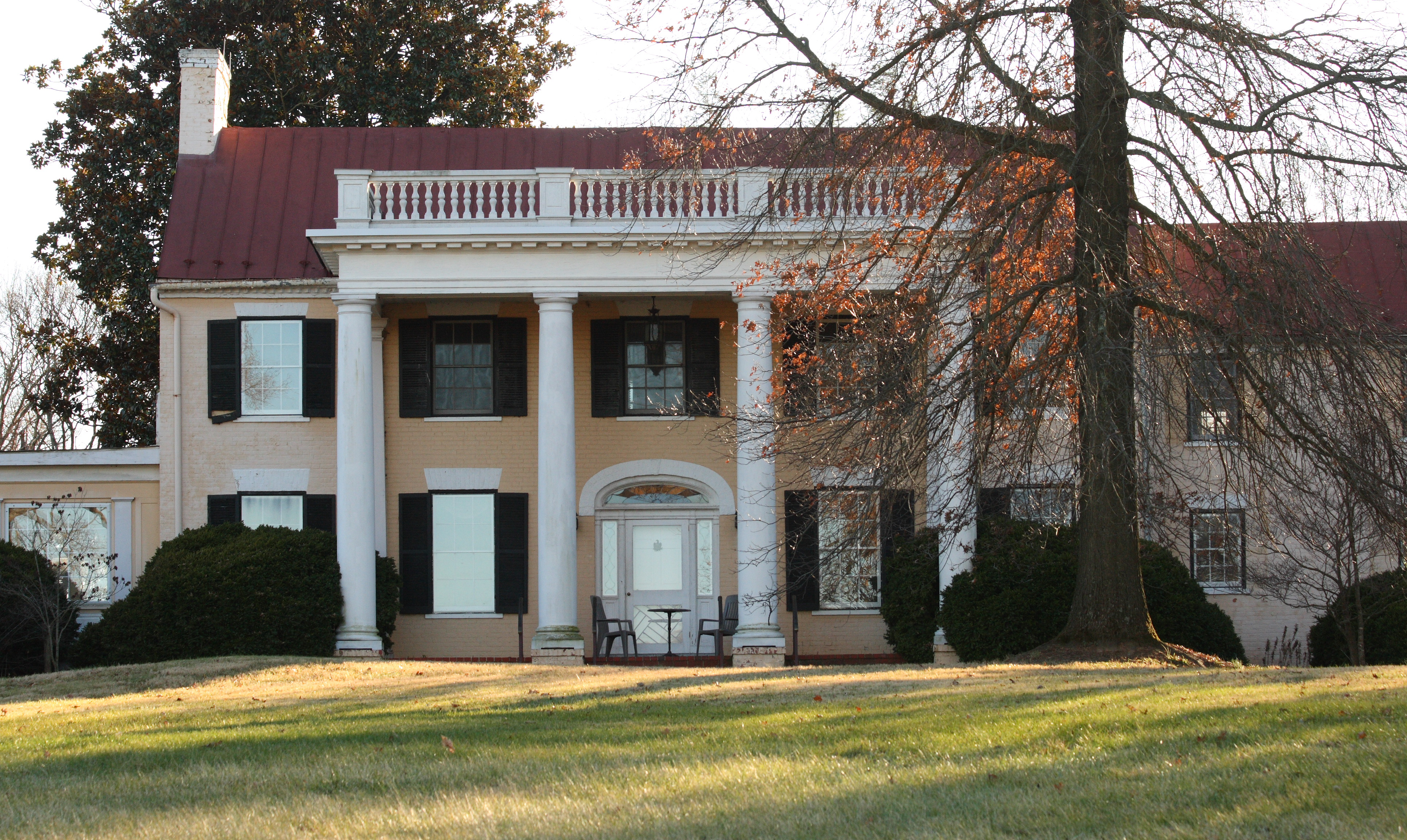
Blakeley (1820) in Jefferson County was built by George Washington's great-nephew, John Augustine Washington II.

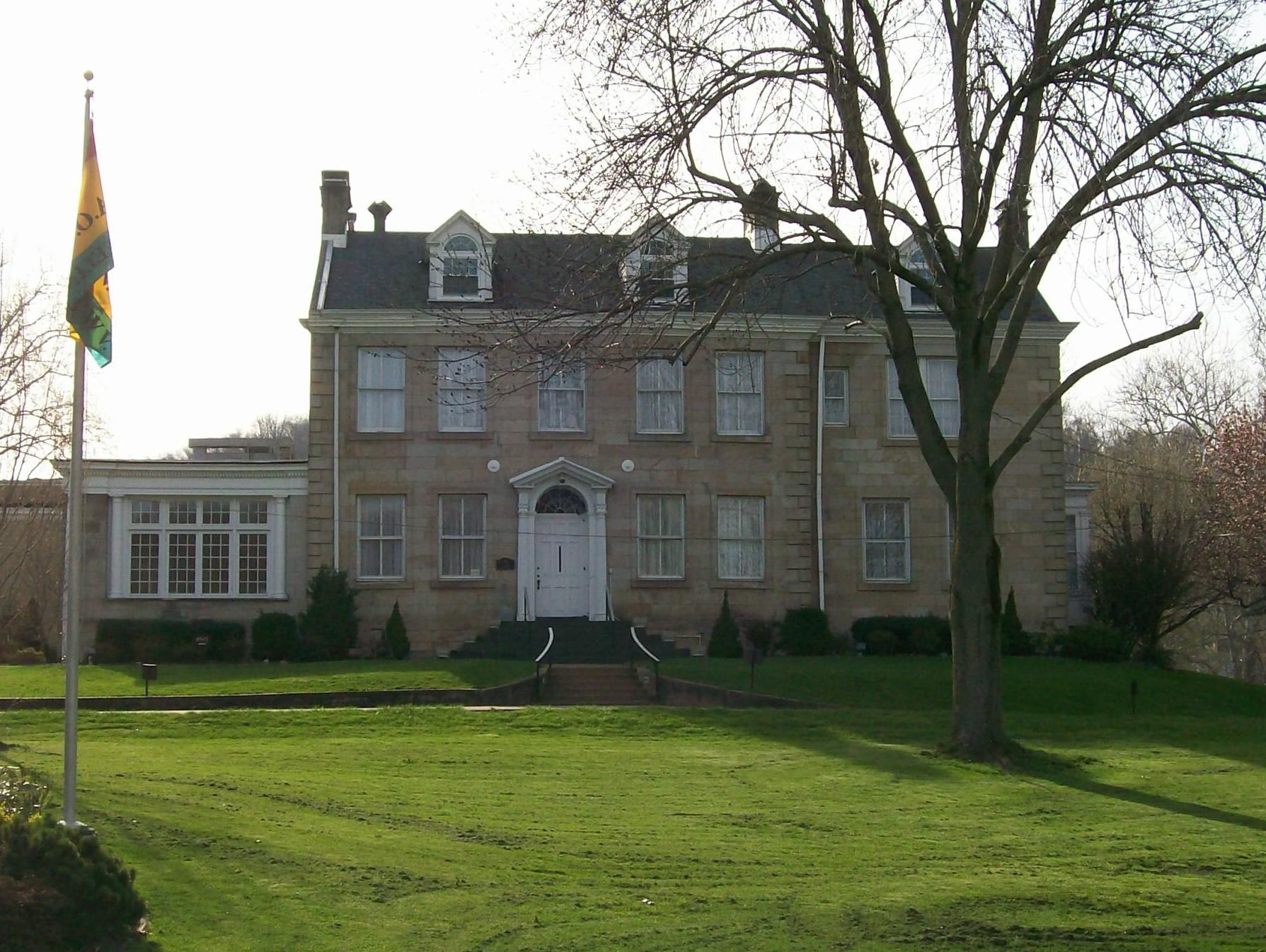
Shepherd Hall (1798) in Ohio County is one of the earliest plantations established in the Ohio River valley.

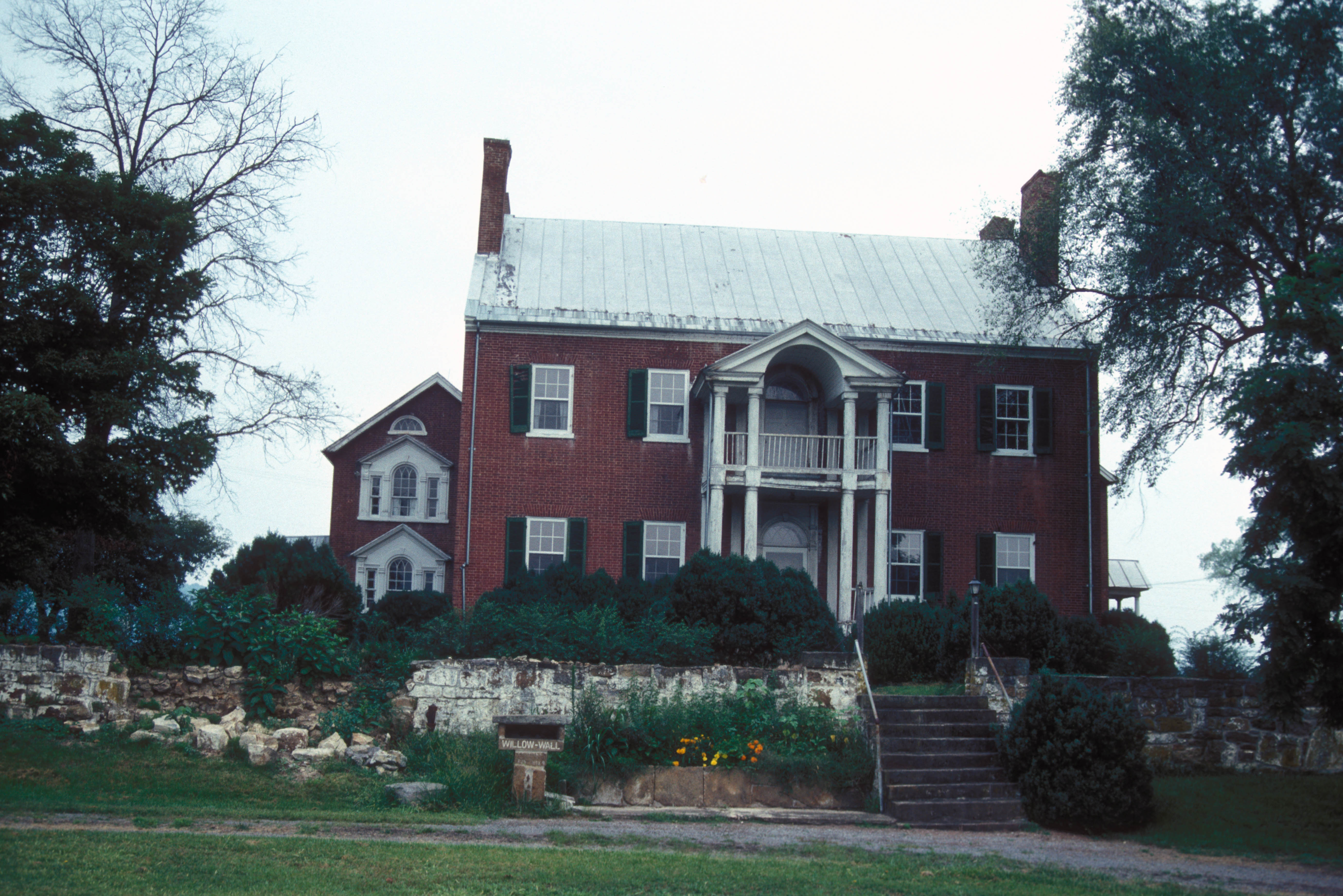
Willow Wall (1811–1812) in Hardy County was used as a hospital by McNeill's Rangers for wounded irregulars.

Plantations that operated within the present-day boundaries of West Virginia were located in the counties of the Ridge-and-Valley Appalachians and in the Kanawha and Ohio River valley regions. Beginning in the mid-to-late 18th century, members of the Washington family and other prominent Virginia families began to build elegant Georgian mansions on their plantations in the Ridge-and-Valley Appalachians region of present-day West Virginia. Plantations initially developed in the counties lying within the Northern Neck Proprietary of Thomas Fairfax, 6th Lord Fairfax of Cameron within the Shenandoah Valley and South Branch Potomac River valleys. Slavery as practiced through plantations in the American South was carried over from the plantations of the Piedmont and Tidewater regions of Virginia, where plantations had become the foundation of society and industry. Following the French and Indian War, settlement and agricultural development continued unabated in the Shenandoah and South Branch Potomac valleys. Early instances of western Virginia plantations with grand homes include the John Ariss-designed Harewood (1774) for George Washington's brother Samuel Washington and Happy Retreat (1780) built by Washington's younger brother Charles Washington, both of which are located near Charles Town in present-day Jefferson County. In Hampshire County, Nicholas Casey constructed a Georgian mansion (1774) at his Wappocomo plantation, one of the first plantation houses of its kind in the South Branch Potomac River valley.

Plantations continued to develop along the fringes of present-day West Virginia. By the close of the 18th century, Harman Blennerhassett had constructed a mansion on his plantation on Blennerhassett Island and Moses Shepherd had built Shepherd Hall near Wheeling, both in the Ohio River valley. Despite the agricultural development of then western Virginia's bottomlands and the resulting wealth of the plantation owners, the hinterlands of the Allegheny Mountains and Allegheny Plateau regions remained underpopulated and inhabited by subsistence farmers of meager means into the middle of the 19th century. By the 1860 United States census, Berkeley, Greenbrier, Hampshire, Hardy, Jefferson, Kanawha, and Monroe counties consequently had the largest populations of slaves in present-day West Virginia.

The economic and political differences between western and eastern Virginia began to grow. Following Virginia's secession from the Union in 1861, the Restored Government of Virginia was established at Wheeling during the American Civil War. Despite West Virginia receiving Union statehood on June 20, 1863, sympathies and loyalties within the state's borders remained divided, especially within areas economically dependent upon the plantation system. However, slaveowners in western Virginia tended to own fewer slaves than their counterparts in eastern Virginia and many did not support Virginia's secession. In Mason County, where small farms were reliant upon slavery, its residents overwhelmingly supported the Union cause. During the war, many plantations in West Virginia served as preferred venues for military headquarters and meeting places for both Union and Confederate military officers due to their adequate accommodations and resources. Altona near Charles Town was utilized as a military headquarters and meeting place for Union generals Philip Sheridan and Ulysses S. Grant, with Sheridan making use of the farm's horses and carriage. Other plantations, like Mill Island and Willow Wall near Moorefield, and Elmwood near Shepherdstown, were utilized as hospitals for wounded soldiers and irregulars.

In anticipation of the passage of the Thirteenth Amendment to the United States Constitution, the West Virginia Legislature at Wheeling passed an act abolishing slavery in West Virginia on February 3, 1865, thus ending the institution of the plantation in West Virginia. Since the 1960s, many of West Virginia's plantation houses have acquired places on the National Register of Historic Places, the United States government's official list of sites, buildings, and structures deemed worthy of preservation. The house at Traveller's Rest, near Kearneysville, is West Virginia's sole plantation house designated as a National Historic Landmark for its national-level historical significance. As of 2015, the majority of West Virginia's plantation houses remain under private ownership.

== Key ==
Color and symbol	Historic register listing
*	National Historic Landmark
†	National Register of Historic Places
‡	United States Historic District
	Not listed on a register.

== Plantations ==
NRHP reference number	Name	Image	Date designated	Locality	County
03000346†	Christian Allemong House	Christian Allemong House	May 2, 2003	Summit Point; 39°14′14″N 77°58′43″W	Jefferson
95001322†	Altona	Altona	November 24, 1995	Charles Town; 39°17′24″N 77°52′57″W	Jefferson
80004024†	Aspen Hill		March 13, 1980	Charles Town; 39°19′18″N 77°51′44″W	Jefferson
07000241†	Barleywood		May 24, 2007	Charles Town; 39°18′54″N 77°54′42″W	Jefferson
73001914†	Beall-Air	Beall-Air	August 17, 1973	Halltown; 39°18′55″N 77°48′44″W	Jefferson
84003588†	Belvedere		January 12, 1984	Charles Town; 39°17′5″N 77°50′43″W	Jefferson
87000486†	Beverley	Beverley	March 20, 1987	Charles Town; 39°15′3″N 77°53′34″W	Jefferson
82004319†	Blakeley	Blakeley	April 15, 1982	Charles Town; 39°15′36″N 77°54′22″W	Jefferson
72001294‡	Blennerhassett Island	Blennerhassett Island	September 7, 1972	Blennerhassett Island; 39°16′19″N 81°37′29″W	Wood
99001397‡	Boidstones Place		November 22, 1999	Shepherdstown; 39°28′11″N 77°48′6″W	Jefferson
82004321†	The Bower	The Bower	April 15, 1982	Leetown; 39°21′54″N 77°57′27″W	Jefferson
	The Burg	The Burg		Mechanicsburg; 39°20′8.84″N 78°48′32.78″W	Hampshire
74002004†	Cedar Lawn	Cedar Lawn	December 4, 1974	Charles Town; 39°17′6″N 77°55′22″W	Jefferson
73001908†	Claymont Court	Claymont Court	July 25, 1973	Charles Town; 39°16′7″N 77°54′21″W	Jefferson
73001917†	Cold Spring	Cold Spring	August 14, 1973	Shepherdstown; 39°23′48″N 77°49′5″W	Jefferson
07000239†	Cool Spring	Cool Spring	March 27, 2007	Charles Town; 39°14′44″N 77°55′55″W	Jefferson
94001292†	Cool Spring	Cool Spring	November 21, 1994	Gerrardstown; 39°19′53″N 78°06′23″W	Berkeley
80004431†	Edgewood		December 10, 1980	Bunker Hill; 39°19′49″N 78°3′29″W	Berkeley
73001918†	Elmwood	Elmwood	August 17, 1973	Shepherdstown; 39°23′50″N 77°48′50″W	Jefferson
76001942†	Elmwood		May 13, 1976	Union; 37°35′44″N 80°32′23″W	Monroe
73001918‡	Fort Hill	Fort Hill	January 9, 1997	Burlington; 39°18′37″N 78°56′8″W	Mineral
78002791†	Green Bottom	Green Bottom	May 22, 1978	Lesage; 38°35′12″N 82°14′58″W	Cabell
88002956‡	Samuel Gwinn Plantation		March 8, 1989	Lowell; 37°38′55″N 80°43′35″W	Summers
73001912†	Happy Retreat	Happy Retreat	July 2, 1973	Charles Town; 39°16′56″N 77°51′35″W	Jefferson
73001909†	Harewood	Harewood	March 14, 1973	Charles Town; 39°18′9″N 77°55′11″W	Jefferson
76001938†	Hazelfield	Hazelfield	December 12, 1976	Shenandoah Junction; 39°22′25″N 77°51′36″W	Jefferson
86000811‡	Henderson Hall	Henderson Hall	April 17, 1986	Williamstown; 39°22′40″N 81°28′58″W	Wood
11000556†	Hickory Grove		August 18, 2011	Romney; 39°19′29″N 78°46′50″W	Hampshire
85003521†	Hillside		December 12, 1985	Charles Town; 39°15′47″N 77°52′5″W	Jefferson
74002007†	Holly Grove	Holly Grove	August 28, 1974	Charleston; 38°20′11″N 81°36′56″W	Kanawha
94000214†	Hopewell		March 25, 1994	Millville; 39°16′4″N 77°47′36″W	Jefferson
84003476†	Lick Run Plantation	Lick Run Plantation	January 12, 1984	Bedington; 39°31′10″N 77°54′2″W	Berkeley
84003623†	Longmeadow/The Holmwood	Longmeadow/The Holmwood	August 23, 1984	Southside; 38°42′11″N 81°58′4″W	Mason
91000452‡	Lynnside Manor	Lynnside Manor	April 26, 1991	Sweet Springs; 37°32′42″N 80°41′14″W	Monroe
80004408‡	Maidstone Manor	Maidstone Manor	December 10, 1980	Hedgesville; 39°35′14″N 77°54′32″W	Berkeley
04000311†	Maidstone-on-the-Potomac	Maidstone-on-the-Potomac	April 15, 2004	Falling Waters; 39°35′59″N 77°50′21″W	Berkeley
75001886†	The Manor		December 18, 1975	Petersburg; 39°0′36″N 79°7′40″W	Grant
93000616†	Media		November 10, 1994	Shenandoah Junction; 39°19′46″N 77°50′32″W	Jefferson
73001904†	Mill Island		July 2, 1973	Moorefield; 39°2′22″N 78°57′38″W	Hardy
75001888†	Montescena		November 12, 1975	Lewisburg; 37°46′14″N 80°28′33″W	Greenbrier
73001916†	Prato Rio	Prato Rio	April 11, 1973	Leetown; 39°20′49″N 77°56′12″W	Jefferson
73001911†	Richwood Hall	Richwood Hall	June 19, 1973	Charles Town; 39°17′32″N 77°55′51″W	Jefferson
01001328‡	Ridgedale		November 29, 2001	Springfield; 39°24′49″N 78°44′19″W	Hampshire
82004320†	Rion Hall	Rion Hall	September 20, 1982	Halltown; 39°18′4″N 77°49′2″W	Jefferson
89002316‡	Rockland		February 5, 1990	Shepherdstown; 39°24′30″N 77°51′29″W	Jefferson
84003500†	Rural Hill	Rural Hill	January 12, 1984	Hedgesville; 39°30′55″N 78°0′5″W	Berkeley
78002791†	Shepherd Hall	Shepherd Hall	December 18, 1970	Wheeling; 40°2′33″N 80°39′33″W	Ohio
95000418†	Snow Hill		April 14, 1995	Leetown; 39°20′7″N 77°54′30″W	Jefferson
80004021†	Sycamore Dale		December 2, 1980	Romney; 39°20′15″N 78°46′24″W	Hampshire
72001288*	Traveller's Rest	Traveller's Rest	November 15, 1972	Kearneysville; 39°23′17.3″N 77°54′04.3″W	Jefferson
12001050†	Valley View	Valley View	December 12, 2012	Romney; 39°21′23.4″N 78°45′35.25″W	Hampshire
84003594†	Vinton		January 12, 1984	Charles Town; 39°16′8″N 77°51′38″W	Jefferson
77001378†	Walnut Grove		August 22, 1977	Union; 37°36′9″N 80°32′29″W	Monroe
	Wappocomo	Wappocomo		Romney; 39°21′37.24″N 78°45′10.21″W	Hampshire
73001906†	Willow Wall	Willow Wall	July 2, 1973	Old Fields; 39°7′40″N 78°57′56″W	Hardy
93001358†	Willowbrook		December 2, 1993	Union; 37°34′30″N 80°32′19″W	Monroe
00000254†	Woodlawn		March 24, 2000	Kearneysville; 39°20′21″N 77°53′07″W	Jefferson
06000654†	York Hill	York Hill	July 26, 2006	Shenandoah Junction; 39°22′36″N 77°50′47″W	Jefferson

== See also ==
- History of slavery in West Virginia
- List of plantations in the United States
- National Register of Historic Places listings in West Virginia

== Bibliography ==
- Ambler, Charles Henry (1910). Sectionalism in Virginia from 1776 to 1861. Chicago: University of Chicago Press. OCLC 608613818 – via Internet Archive.
- Brannon, Selden W., ed. (1976). Historic Hampshire: A Symposium of Hampshire County and Its People, Past and Present. Parsons, West Virginia: McClain Printing Company. ISBN 978-0-87012-236-1. OCLC 3121468.
- Chambers, S. Allen (2004). Buildings of West Virginia. Oxford, New York City: Oxford University Press. ISBN 9780195165487. OCLC 53315276.
- Kennedy, Joseph C. G. (1864). Population of the United States in 1860 Compiled from the Original Returns of the Eighth Census under the Direction of the Secretary of the Interior. Washington, D.C.: United States Government Printing Office. OCLC 173567 – via Internet Archive.
