= Woodlawn (Kearneysville, West Virginia) =

Historic house in West Virginia, United States

- U.S. National Register of Historic Places
- Location within West Virginia Location within the United States
- Nearest city: Kearneysville, West Virginia
- Coordinates: 39°20′21″N 77°53′7″W
- Built: 1820
- Architect: Hurst, James; Davenport, Samual
- Architectural style: Federal
- NRHP reference No.: 00000254
- Added to NRHP: March 24, 2000

Woodlawn, also known as Wiltshire House or Wiltshire Farm, was built circa 1820, one of four homes within a two-mile radius by James Hurst, a significant landowner in Jefferson County. Hurst built the first three houses for his children on his "LaGrange" plantation around 1811, including "Snow Hill' (now known as the Jefferson County Alms House (c. 1815) and the Coyle House (c. 1820). Woodlawn was built for the adopted daughter of Samuel Davenport, whose married name was Camilla Wiltshire. All of these homes used salt-glazed brick, as did Elmwood and the Tate-Fairfax-Muse House.
