= Barleywood =

Historic house in West Virginia, United States

- U.S. National Register of Historic Places
- Location within West Virginia Location within the United States
- Nearest city: Charles Town, West Virginia
- Coordinates: 39°18′54″N 77°54′42″W
- Built: 1842
- Architectural style: Mid 19th Century Revival
- NRHP reference No.: 07000241
- Added to NRHP: May 24, 2007

Barleywood is a farm in Jefferson County, West Virginia, on land once owned by Samuel Washington, brother of George Washington. The farm is close to Samuel's manor house, Harewood, from which the Barleywood property was subdivided in 1841. The Barleywood house was built in 1842, as well as several outbuildings which survive. The house sat vacant from the 1960s to the late 2010s and during that time it suffered from vandalism. It is now a private residence.

== History ==
The Washington family acquired extensive holdings in Jefferson County, Virginia during the 1770s. Samuel Washington's Harewood estate comprised 3,800 acres (1,500 ha), which were subsequently subdivided by his heirs into at least six smaller estates: Barleywood, Cedar Lawn, Locust Hill, Megwillie, Richwood Hall and Sulgrave. The farms initially produced tobacco with slave labor, but later shifted to grain production. George Steptoe Washington inherited Harewood from his father in 1781, but died in 1809 at the age of 37. His son, William Temple Washington received the portion containing Barleywood by subdivision as the Harewood property was shared among the heirs. Further subdivisions ensued, and William finally sold the future Harewood property to his daughter Millicent and her husband, Robert G. McPherson. The house was built about 1842. The household in 1850 consisted of Robert and Millicent, their four children, two servant girls, and ten slaves.

The McPhersons sold Barleywood to Humphrey Keyes in 1853 for $12,203. At the same time Keyes bought William T. Washington's adjoining Megwillie estate, whose house had burned. During the American Civil War, Barleywood and surrounding estates were the scene of skirmishes, particularly in August 1864. After the death of Keyes in 1875 and his wife Jane in 1879, the farm passed to their daughters, who never lived there, renting them to tenants. The tenant house was built about 1900 to house farm workers, and the granary was built at about the same time. Unlike many nearby farms, the Barleywood estate was not converted to orchard use. Susan Keyes Ambler died in 1925, and the farm passed to her children. Parcels of the farm were sold off by her heirs in 1952 and 1956. The house was not occupied after the 1960s. By 2006 much of the land was developed for residential use, and in 2019 the manor was lovingly restored.

== Description ==
The 1842 house is a two-story, three bay brick structure with Greek Revival elements and a side hall double-parlor plan. A subsidiary two-story service wing is attached to the east side, set back from the front. Several porches were once present, but have been lost to deterioration and vandalism, as has some of the interior plaster and woodwork. The stair and entrance hall runs the depth of the east side, with two parlors to the west, separated by large doors. A door behind the stairs leads to the service wing. The second floor follows the same plan, with a small room added in front of the stairs. A single attic room is finished with plaster. There is a stone basement. The service wing has a kitchen in the cellar, with single rooms on the first and second floors.

Outbuildings include a cistern, located next to the kitchen, and a smokehouse, both dated to 1842. Ruins of an 1840s barn are located to the northwest of the house. A pumphouse and a granary date to 1900. Close to the main road, a two-story wood frame tenant house exists, though extensively damaged by fire.

Barleywood was placed on the National Register of Historic Places on May 24, 2007.
