= History of slavery in West Virginia =

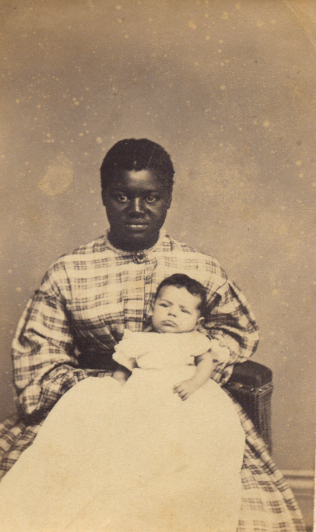
Carte-de-visite taken in Wheeling, April 15, 1865, Brown & Lose, Photographers, notated on reverse "Aunt Susan"

The western part of Virginia which became West Virginia was settled in two directions, north to south from Pennsylvania, Maryland and New Jersey and from east to west from eastern Virginia and North Carolina. The earliest arrival of enslaved people was in the counties of the Shenandoah Valley, where prominent Virginia families built houses and plantations. The earliest recorded slave presence was about 1748 in Hampshire County on the estate of Thomas Fairfax, 6th Lord Fairfax of Cameron, which included 150 enslaved people. By the early 19th century, slavery had spread to the Ohio River up to the northern panhandle.

== The beginning of slavery ==
Early settlers of property tended to recreate the familiar structures of eastern Virginia, building Georgian and Federal homes on large estates. The counties of the eastern panhandle, especially Jefferson and Berkeley, were the most reminiscent of eastern Virginia. Many prominent families, such as the Washingtons, Fairfaxes, and Lees, had properties here. In 1817 Col. John Fairfax of Preston County began the construction of his mansion, Fairfax Manor, with the aid of his sons and 30 enslaved people. The old log homes on the estate, formerly the residences of Col. Fairfax and his family, became the slave quarters. In 1836 David Gibson began construction of Sycamore Dale in Romney, Hampshire County, with the aid of 100 enslaved people.

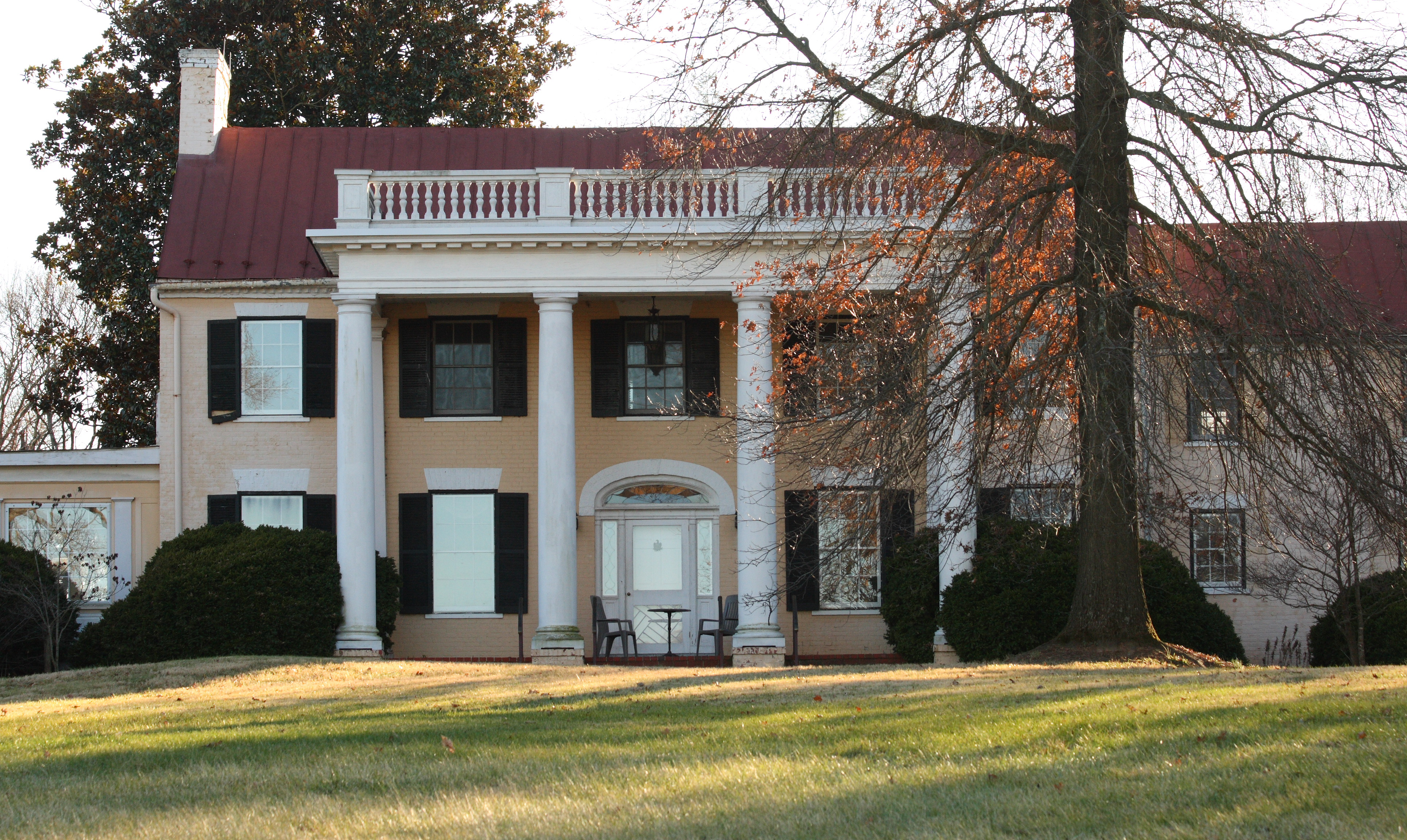
"Blakeley", Jefferson County, home of John Augustine Washington II, built 1820

News of Ebenezer Zane's settlement near present-day Wheeling and the prospect of cheap and fertile land drew new settlers from as far away as New England. They would sometimes purchase enslaved people in Maryland and northern Virginia on their way to the Kanawha and Ohio River valleys. Large clearing of lands began after 1790. New settlers also moved into these areas from eastern Virginia and North Carolina. In the early 19th century new settlers on their way to the Missouri territory would pass through the Kanawha Valley to the Ohio River and often remained there, attracted by the low cost of land and money made by leasing the people they enslaved to the local saltmakers.

In 1800 Harman Blennerhassett built a large Palladian home on Belpre Island, now called Blennerhassett Island, on the Ohio River near Parkersburg. Similar structures and accompanying slaves soon spread along the Ohio River up to the northern panhandle. In 1814 Zadok Cramer wrote of his travels on the Ohio River in the Western Gleaner:

There is a plain contrast between the different sides of the river, arising from slavery being forbid on one, and tolerated on the other ... On the Virginia side, there were some good houses at remote distances from each other but accompanied by the negro quarters. On the other side neat cottages and comfortable cabins were to be seen at every little remove along the river ...

Wheeling was the largest city in western Virginia and the fourth largest city in Virginia, poised northward between Ohio and Pennsylvania. The number of enslaved people in the northern panhandle was comparatively small, reaching 247 in the 4 counties by 1850. One of West Virginia's northernmost plantations was Shepherd Hall, a Federal house built in 1798 by Moses Shepherd, which had slave quarters, its own mill and tannery. In her visit to the United States in 1829, Frances Trollope found in Wheeling "all that sedulous attention which in this country distinguishes a slave state". The Wheeling newspapers criticized the activities of Ohio humane societies and their support for runaway slaves. The Wheeling Daily Intelligencer, until purchased by Republican Archibald Campbell in 1856, routinely printed articles defending slavery and attacking abolitionism. After his acquisition of the paper, Campbell printed moderate attacks on slavery, keeping just short of breaking Virginia's laws restricting abolition propaganda. Wheeling's most noted writer of the period, Rebecca Harding Davis, explained Wheeling's unusual position-"We occupied the place of Hawthorne's unfortunate man who saw both sides."

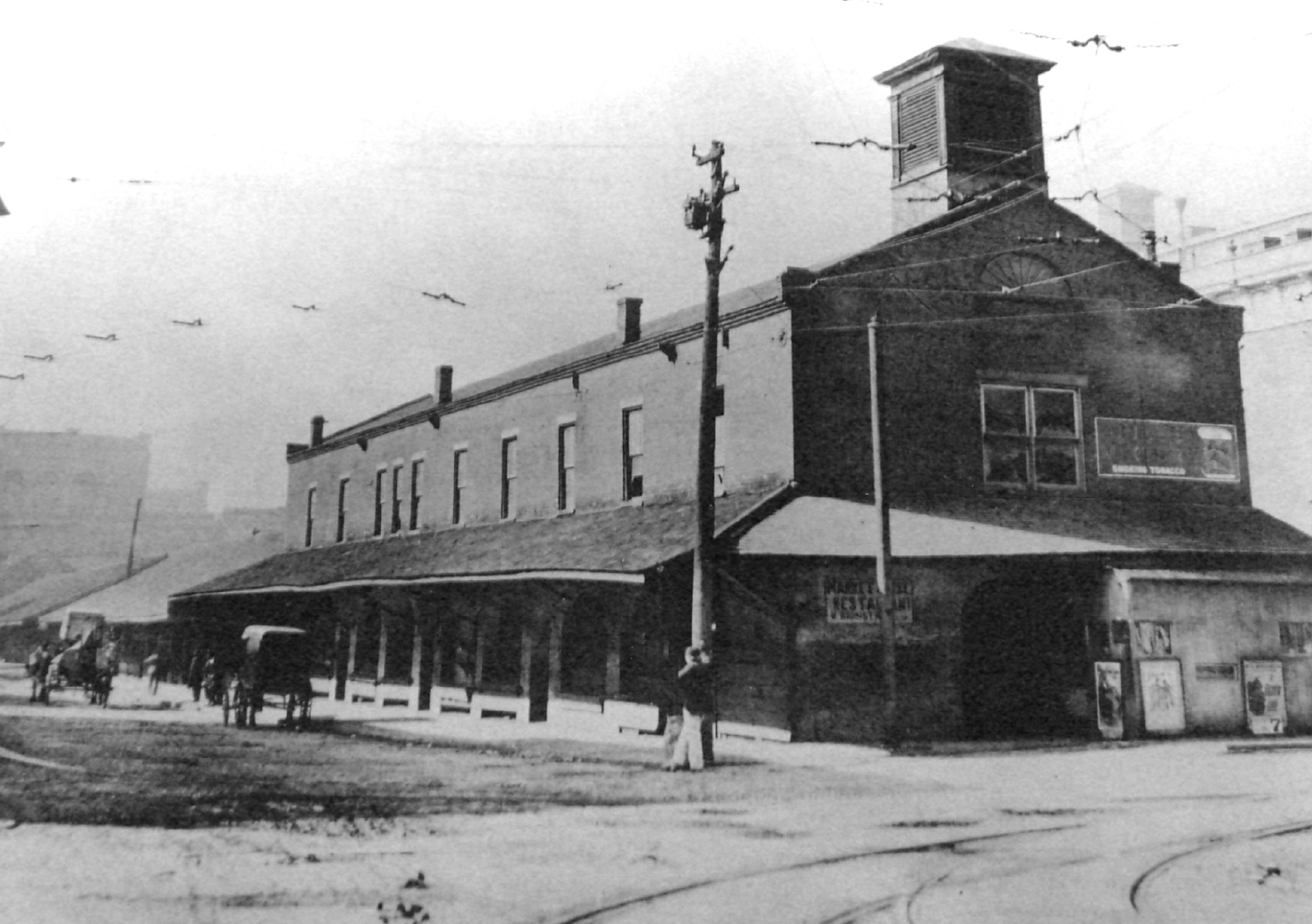
Wheeling's Market House and Town Hall, where weekly slave auctions were held

Wheeling became a major regional hub for hiring or selling enslaved people to the local salt industry and to markets in the lower south. Weekly slave auctions were held there and also in Charleston. When enslaved people were part of an estate, auctions were usually held at the county courthouse. In 1835 a large auction was held in Charlestown, Jefferson County. One male slave sold for $1200, a woman and four children for $1950, the modern equivalent of $30,000 and $49,000 respectively. Although slave owners were a minority in West Virginia, they owned a higher proportion of land and wealth and often held public office in the county and state, where they could adapt public policy to their interests.

== Occupations ==
By 1860 the use of slave labor in West Virginia was about 48% in agriculture, 16% in commerce, 21% in industry and 15% in mixed occupations.

- Agriculture

Farming in West Virginia produced about twice as much grain and livestock than was needed for subsistence, with one in ten farm workers being a slave. Women worked in the fields along with the men, sometimes acting as drovers, supervisors and performing general maintenance, such as cutting fence rails. Rather than depending on overseers, tasks would be assigned for daily or weekly completion. Most enslaved people engaged in agriculture were to be found on farms with less than 10 slaves, where the owners often worked in the fields as well. In wealthier households enslaved people would be used for domestic duties and as servants.

- Extraction and industry

Salt was one of the first exports from West Virginia. By 1828 sixty-five wells along the Kanawha River produced 787,000 bushels of salt per year, and by 1835 the industry used the labor of nearly 3,000 men, mostly enslaved people. Much of Charleston's growth was a result of this resource. By 1852 a yearly fleet of 400 flatboats moved three million bushels of salt to markets south and midwest. The growth of the salt industry also resulted in exploitation of lumber, coal and gas resources, with increased use of slave labor. By 1860, however, salt production was in decline, with only 14 wells located in the counties of Kanawha, Mason, Marion and Mercer. Kanawha County wells used 63% of all male and 29% of all female enslaved people in the county. Slaves could be hired for half the cost of free workers, and required less supervision. Living conditions for the enslaved people were unsanitary, and outbreaks of cholera often occurred. In 1844 one hundred enslaved people died over a three-month period from cholera. The actual number of enslaved people in the Kanwaha Valley exceeded the stated census numbers due to the shifting population of hired slaves in the salt industry.

Coal was used to fuel the salt furnaces of the Kanawha Valley, and by 1860 twenty-five companies were engaged in coal mining in West Virginia, the largest being the Winifrede Mining and Manufacturing Company. These companies advertised for hired slaves at $120 to $200 a year. Women and children were also employed in the mines. Approximately 2000 enslaved people were employed in coal mining. A system of slides, tramways and rail moved the coal to barges for export to Louisville, Cincinnati and the lower south.

By 1860 West Virginia had 14 iron plantations. These facilities often occupied from one-quarter to one-third of the land in their home counties, averaging about 12,000 acres (49 km^{2}). Slave labor made up about 75% of the work force.

- Recreation

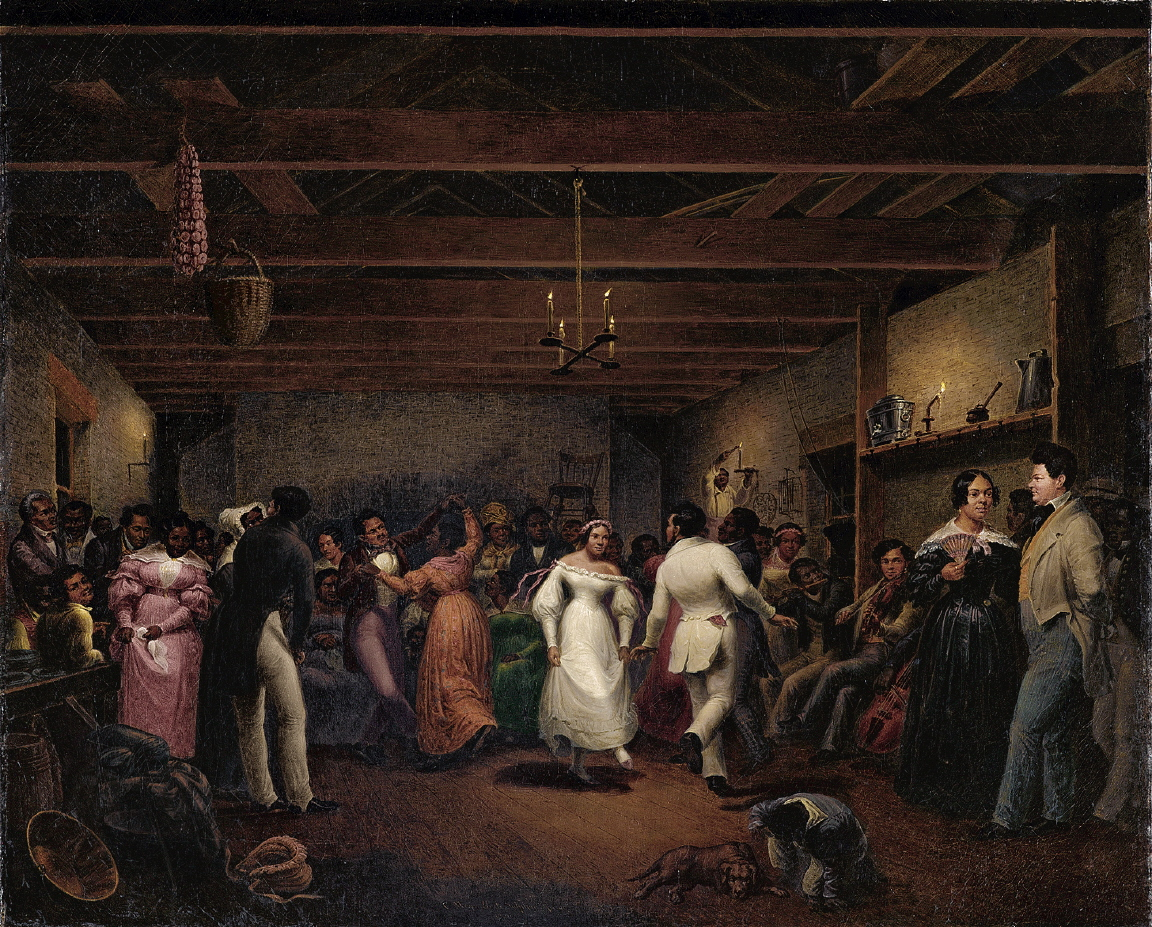
"Kitchen Ball at White Sulphur Springs, Virginia", by Christian Mayr, 1838. A celebration at a slave wedding.

The mineral springs of southern West Virginia were favored destinations of vacationing southern society and drew visitors from as far away as Louisiana and the Gulf States. Presidents of the United States, Supreme Court justices, and politicians such as John C. Calhoun, Henry Clay and Daniel Webster met and socialized here. Periodicals such as Debow's Review urged southerners to take advantage of their highlands for their recreation instead of the annual migrations north. Richmond slave exchanges recruited workers for the resorts and springs. The "Old White" at White Sulphur Springs in Greenbrier County valued its holdings at $100,000 in real estate and $56,000 in enslaved people. At the Old White one traveller wrote of three enslaved people who played at the nightly dances, using a fiddle, tambourine, and the skull of an ass. Another visitor described her view behind the scenes at the Old White thus: "In the various departments we found admirable system, healthy, likely slaves all employed; yet evidently not overworked or oppressed—a corps of subordinates having their duties so arranged, that they relieved each other in quick succession whenever the work was severe. Whether the perfection of the management arises from perseverance in method, or efficient servants, the result is certainly admirable."

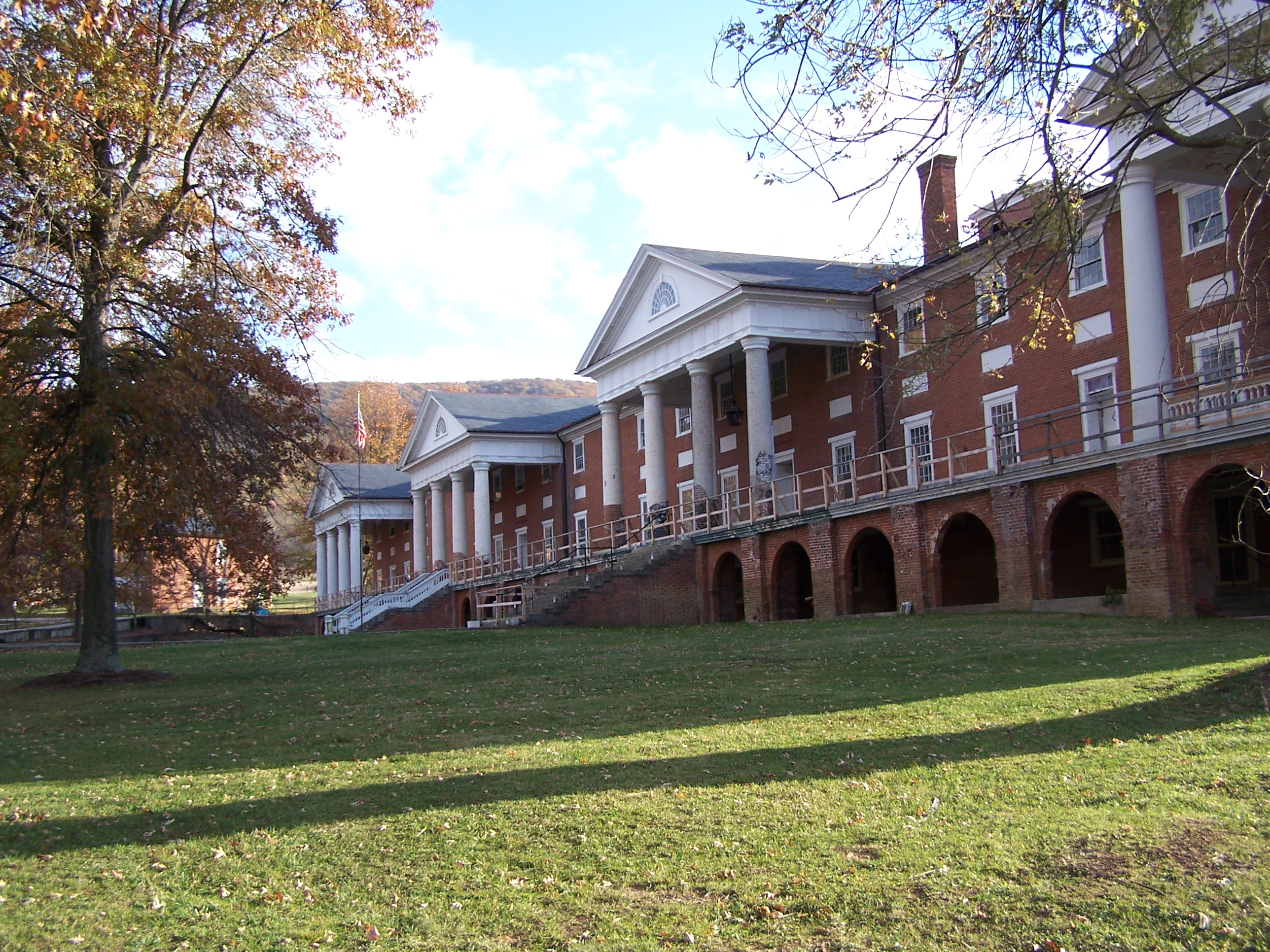
Sweet Springs, building designed by William B. Phillips circa 1830

Sweet Springs in Monroe County had buildings designed by William B. Phillips, who had assisted Thomas Jefferson in the building of the University of Virginia. Frame structures were provided for enslaved people and livery. It was one of the oldest resorts in West Virginia, the first hotel having been built there in 1792. The hotel was forbidden from selling strong drink to any freedman or slave. Other popular resorts and spas during the era of slavery were Salt Sulphur Springs, Red Sulphur Springs, Shannondale Springs, Berkeley Springs, Blue Sulphur Springs, and Capon Springs.

- Transportation and commerce

Enslaved people were used on waterways and overland in the transportation of West Virginia products, livestock, salt, grain, tobacco, lumber and coal. Several times a year fleets of flatboats left Charleston, manned by both slave and free workmen, to markets in Cincinnati and New Orleans. The B&O Railroad hired and bought West Virginia slaves to work in construction gangs and in passenger service. Enslaved people were sometimes used in the operation of retail stores. In some towns, like Martinsburg, the black population could reach nearly one-third the total residents., while in Charleston it was just over one-fourth the population, with only a few of that number being freedmen.

== Population ==
Slave population in West Virginia
Year	Population
1820	15,178
1830	17,673
1840	18,488
1850	20,428
1860	18,371

Western Virginia's slave population peaked in 1850 with 20,428 enslaved people, or nearly 7% of the population. In 1860 the number of enslaved people was 18,371. Much of the decreased number of enslaved people in West Virginia was due to the high demand for them in the lower South. The opening of Cherokee lands in north Georgia and Alabama resulted in the growth of cotton and tobacco production, and the slave population there nearly tripled from 1840 to 1860. Slave "coffles" became frequent sights in West Virginia. These were groups of enslaved people, usually bound together by rope, that were moved mostly overland to markets in the lower south. Often they were not told of their destination for fear of runaways or resistance. With the increasing value of enslaved people in the 1840s and 1850s they were sometimes kidnapped to be resold.

The 1860 U.S. Census counted 3,605 slave owners in West Virginia. Of this number 2,572 (71%) owned 5 or less. These owners accounted for 33% of the total number of enslaved people. In 15 counties there was a total of 92 owners of 20 or more enslaved people. The greatest numbers occurred in the counties of Jefferson (3,960), Kanawha (2,184), Berkeley (1,650), Greenbrier (1,525), Hampshire (1,213), Monroe (1,114), and Hardy (1,073). There were also 2,773 freedmen living in West Virginia.

== Abolition and pro-slavery ==
There was no organized anti-slavery movement in West Virginia as there was in Kentucky, Maryland or Delaware, and few abolitionists. Resistance to slavery was usually due to religious affiliation or based on economic principles. In some communities of immigrant settlers, such as the Germans, anti-slavery sentiment was dominant. Some West Virginia anti-slavery sentiment was politically based, as slaveholders from Virginia used the institution to gain unequal representation in the General Assembly and Congress, and tax advantages.

In 1831, after Nat Turner's slave rebellion, the General Assembly of 1831–32 was challenged to find solutions to the growing problems of slavery. Some proposed immediate emancipation, some gradual emancipation and deportation, while others preferred the status quo. Thomas Jefferson Randolph proposed a gradual emancipation, and George W. Summers of Kanawha County proposed funding the project from the sale of public lands, but the General Assembly adjourned without taking any action.

In 1844 the Methodist Church became divided over the ownership of enslaved people by its ministers. A line was drawn west from Lynchburg, north of which slave ownership was forbidden. This would have included most of West Virginia. However, many Methodist churches in West Virginia refused to follow this decision. The Western Virginia Conference of the Methodist church at their meeting in March 1861, resolved to "utterly condemn any attempt to interfere with the legal relation of master and servant." In Marion county a congregation urged the church to "send among us only such ministers as have wisdom and grace enough to enable them to preach the gospel without meddling with our civil institutions." A similar split occurred in the Baptist denomination within West Virginia.

Henry Ruffner of Lexington, Virginia, was a professor at Washington College and its president from 1836 to 1848. His father owned land and slaves in the Kanawha Valley, and he had attended school in Shepherdstown and was a slave owner himself. In 1847 he published a pamphlet, An Address to the People of West Virginia, often called the "Ruffner pamphlet", which was the result of a speech he gave in Lexington at the Franklin Society. He advocated an end to slavery in the west for economic and social reasons, believing that slavery retarded development and growth.

In the 1840s the recently formed abolitionist Liberty Party attempted to attract Virginians to their cause and did draw some members from western Virginia. The advocacy of abolitionism, however, also brought about violent reactions from pro-slavery Virginians. From 1840 through the 1850s most of the notable mob actions against abolitionists in Virginia took place in western Virginia. In 1839 a mob from Guyandotte crossed the Ohio River and kidnapped a man in order to tar and feather him. In 1854 West Virginians again crossed the river to Quaker Bottom (now Proctorville), to attack abolitionists.

The 1850–51 Constitutional Convention in Richmond addressed many of the complaints of West Virginians, and finally gave the vote to all white male residents 21 years of age, and representation in the House of Delegates of the General Assembly based on the white population from the census of 1850. Representation in the Senate, however, was arbitrarily determined, the east getting 30 senators and the west 20. The slaveholders also gave themselves a tax advantage: enslaved people under 12 years of age were not taxed, while those who were older were only taxed at a value of $300. Despite these inequities, the new constitution was opposed only by a few counties in the east.

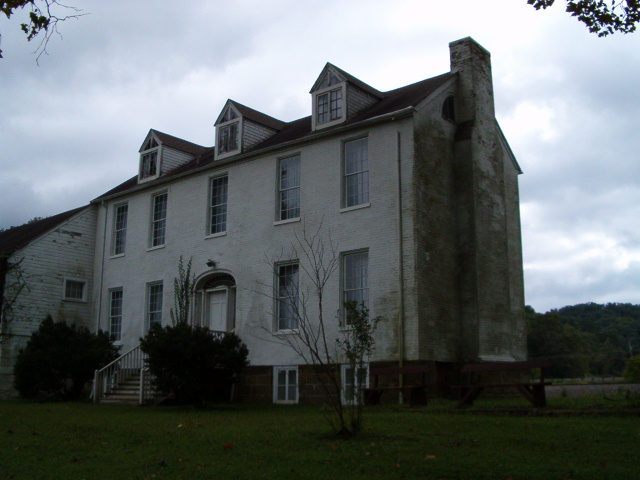
Green Bottom Plantation, Cabell County, West Virginia. Home of Albert G. Jenkins, U.S. Congressman and C.S.A. Brigadier General

In 1856 Massachusetts abolitionist Eli Thayer was looking for property in the south where he could establish a working colony free of slavery. He finally settled on Wayne County and built the village of Ceredo. He faced severe opposition to his colony by U.S. Congressman Albert G. Jenkins, himself the owner of Green Bottom Plantation in nearby Cabell County with 30-some enslaved people.

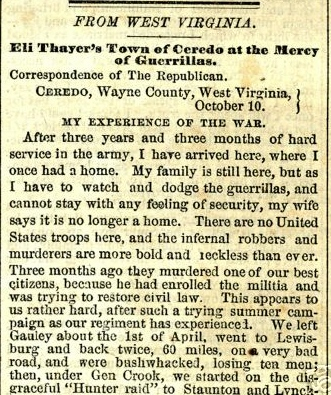
Springfield (Ma.) Daily Republican newspaper article about raid on Eli Thayer's colony of Ceredo, 1864

At first the new settlement was welcomed, but after John Brown's raid on Harpers Ferry in 1859 local residents became hostile to the Ceredo colony. During the war Ceredo became a focus of Unionism and raised Union militia. This made it a favorite target for local Confederate raiders like William "Rebel Bill" Smith and by the end of the war Ceredo was almost abandoned.

At times slaveowners freed some or all of their slaves as part of their estate. In eastern Virginia in 1848 John Warwick of Amherst County, and Frances Eppes of Henrico County freed all of their slaves in their estates. In western Virginia Sampson Sanders of Cabell County freed his slaves on his death in 1849. Due to a Virginia law that required manumitted slaves to leave the state within one year of freedom, most of the estates provided funds for the equipment and settling of the freedmen in other states. When Sanders' will was made the formerly enslaved people were to be resettled in Indiana, but Indiana had since passed a law forbidding the immigration of freedmen. Mr. Sanders' executors instead settled the newly freed people in Cass County, Michigan.

A freedman could apply to the General Assembly or the county court for permission to remain in Virginia. The life of a freedman was often perilous, with the prospect of re-enslavement a constant hazard. A freedman could be enslaved for infractions of the law, debt or vagrancy. In Monroe County in 1829 the sheriff was ordered to sell into slavery eight freedmen for failure to pay their taxes. Freedmen were also required to carry their papers as proof of their status and failure to do so could result in a fine or imprisonment. Any slave who was away from his owner's property was required to carry a written pass as slave patrols were on the lookout for runaways or unsupervised enslaved people.

== American Colonization Society ==
The American Colonization Society was active from late 1816 to the end of the Civil War, their goal being the establishment of an African republic where formerly enslaved people could experience a freedom not available to them anywhere in the United States. Slaveowners wanted to get rid of freedmen, free blacks, because they were disruptive to the slave system, encouraging and facilitating escapes. Even among some abolitionists in the North freedman were seen as incompatible to their vision of American society.

While the idea of "returning Blacks to Africa" had an abstract appeal, it was overwhelmingly opposed by the Black population, who said they were no more African than white Americans were British. Because of poor funding and lack of ships (it was remarked that the entire U.S. Navy would not have been sufficient) only a handful of formerly enslaved people reached Liberia: in the case of West Virginia, with 18,000 enslaved according to the 1860 Census, in some 25 years only 184 West Virginian blacks emigrated to the future Liberia. As Gerrit Smith observed, the colonization project was nothing more than a ruse to give the impression that "the solution" to American slavery was being implemented. According to Smith, the goal of the American Colonization Society was to preserve slavery, not abolish it. (See American Colonization Society#Gerrit Smith.)

=== History of emigration to Liberia from West Virginia ===
The first emigrants to Liberia from West Virginia were from Berkeley county. Isaac Stubblefield, his wife and three children, sailed on the Harriet from Norfolk in 1829. Their emigration was sponsored by Edward Colston, nephew of Chief Justice John Marshall, who himself was president of the Virginia Colonization Society. In the 1830s the women of the Washington-Blackburn families of Jefferson county gathered a group of freed people for emigration to Liberia, uniting some families for the purpose and collecting donations for supplies and goods for the emigrants. A young divinity student, A.H. Lamon, accompanied the families to Washington, D.C. There Mr. Lamon also met another group of emigrants from Hardy county, who were being sponsored by the Vanmeter family. Starting in 1830 Ann, Susan, and Rebecca Vanmeter and their sister Hannah Vanmeter Hopewell, sponsored two groups totaling thirteen freed slaves.

John Augustine Washington and his wife Jane Blackburn Washington owned two plantations, Mount Vernon and Blakeley. Jane Washington emancipated Lewis Wiggins, Charles Starkes, and their families, who left for Liberia in 1849. In her will she emancipated another of Charles Starkes' family who was also sent to Liberia in 1854.

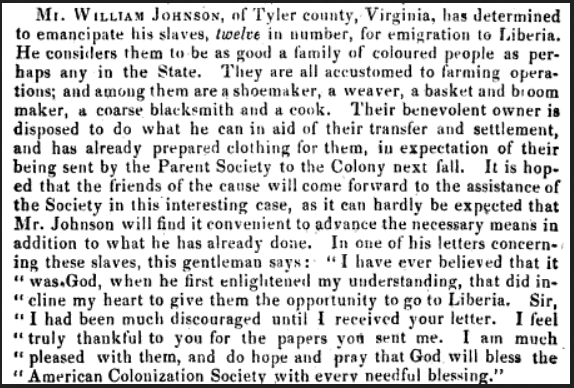
African Repository and Colonial Journal, August 1837, describing the efforts of William Johnson of Tyler County to settle his former slaves in Liberia

In 1836, William Johnson of Tyler county attempted to transport 12 freedpersons to Liberia, but lacked the connections and wealth of the Blackburn and Washington families. The Society issued an appeal for funds, donations were received from Colonizationists in Wheeling and other friends and family. He accompanied the new emigrants to Washington, D.C., and then to Norfolk, where they embarked on the Saluda for Liberia in 1840.

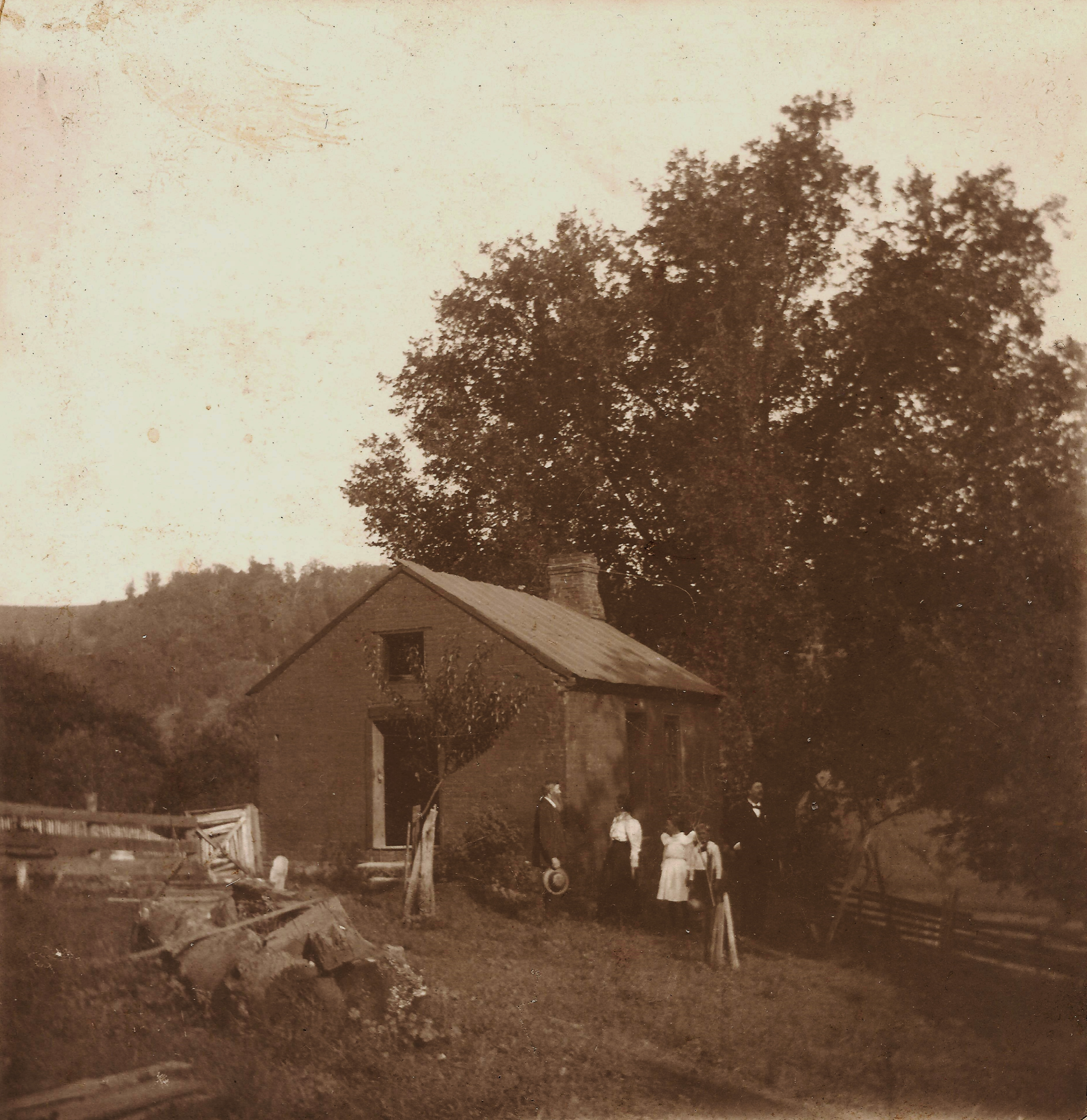
Slave quarters on the William Johnson farm, circa 1900. In 1840 William Johnson sent his former slaves to Liberia.

In 1833 and again in 1850 bills were passed by the Virginia legislature to encourage free black emigration to Liberia. The funds were not available however to newly manumitted slaves as the legislature had no wish to encourage emancipation. The bill was partially funded by a yearly tax of one dollar on all male free blacks between 21 and 55 years of age.

A census of Liberia was conducted in 1843 and few of the early emigrants from West Virginia were listed. The landscape and climate were alien to the new settlers, and malaria took a heavy toll on the population. Jacob Snyder, an elderly man from Jefferson county, believed that he could beat the fever by "starving" it, but succumbed to starvation after not eating or drinking for nine days after his arrival. Judith Blackburn was dismayed by the first reports written to her from the former slaves, who described a hostile environment with a high death rate due to malaria.

The late 1850s saw the last groups of emigrants leaving for Liberia from West Virginia. Samson Caesar, a Liberian from West Virginia who had left Buckhannon in 1834, despaired for the future of Liberia, blaming the United States for the lack of education and training that had been denied the former slaves. He wrote "I can only Say that if the Coulard man had the Same opportunity with the White man he would not be one Step behind him in no respect."

During this period of expatriation a total of 184 free persons were transported to Liberia. Jefferson county sent 124 people, Berkeley and Hardy counties sent 13 people each, Tyler county sent 12, Hampshire and Randolph counties sent 9 each, and Lewis, Marion, Monroe and Pendleton sent 1 each.

== Underground Railroad ==
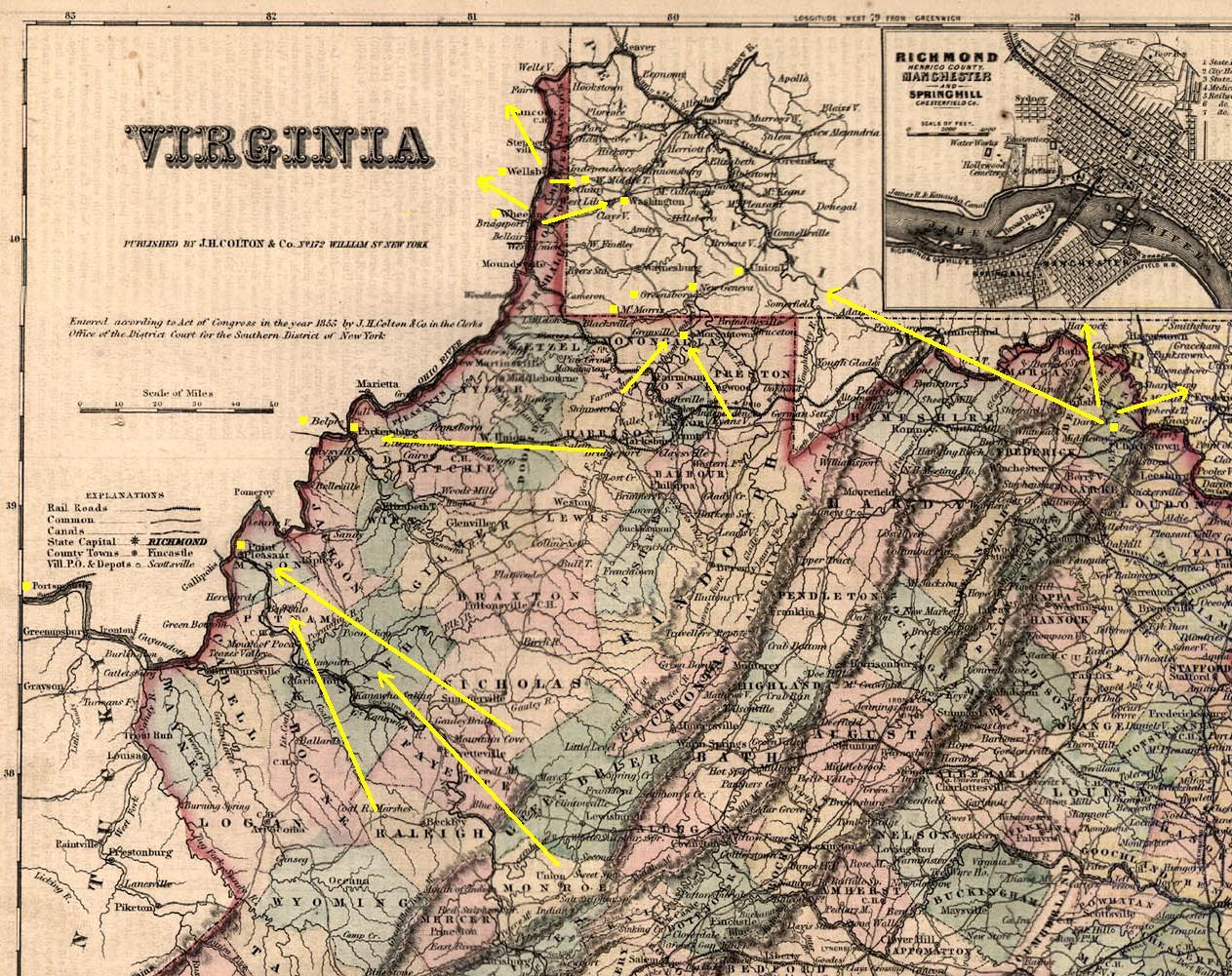
Routes of the Underground Railroad through West Virginia

- Harper's Ferry route

Slaves of lighter complexion sometimes bought passage on the B&O railroad to reach Pittsburgh. Other slaves crossed the narrow panhandle of Maryland on foot to reach Pennsylvania. A large number of free blacks worked with Quakers in this area to facilitate escape. In 1845, Dr. Robert Mitchell of Pennsylvania was sued by Garret van Metre of Hardy County for aiding the escape of his slave Jared. In two trials held in Pittsburgh Mr. van Metre was awarded $500 from Dr. Mitchell for the loss of his slave.

- Morgantown route

Two routes ran through the Morgantown area to Pennsylvania. One was a trail that led through Mount Morris, Pa. to Greensboro, Pa. The other route left Morgantown and ran parallel to the Monongahela River, going through the town of New Geneva, Pa., to Uniontown. The A.M.E. Zion Church had congregations in both Morgantown and across the border in Fayette County, Pa.

- Point Pleasant-Parkersburg route

Slaves escaping the interior of West Virginia could follow the Kanawha River to Point Pleasant. From there they could follow the Ohio River north to Parkersburg. Across the river from Parkersburg was the Ohio town of Belpre where a Col. John Stone acted as an agent for the railroad. Fugitives were hidden at Parkersburg by a black woman called "Aunt Jenny" until they could cross the river. In 1847 Wood County plantation owner George Henderson filed suit in Ohio against abolitionist David Putnam of Marietta, Ohio, for the loss of 9 slaves. The suit was eventually dropped in 1853. Other agents for the railroad were an unnamed barber from Jackson, Ohio, who visited Point Pleasant and would help slaves to Portsmouth, Ohio, and a teacher, Rail Cheadle, of Morgan County, Ohio.

- Wheeling-Wellsburg route

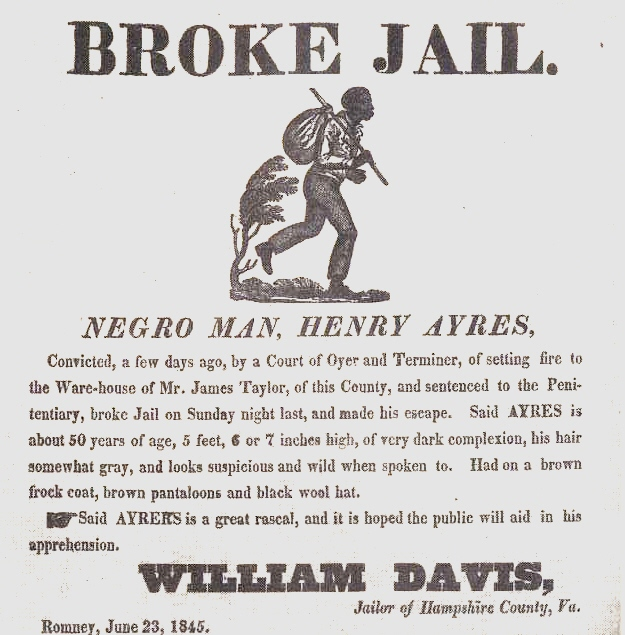
Broadside from Hampshire County for an escaped slave, 1845

Wheeling was an important stop for runaways, standing as it does between Ohio and Pennsylvania. A branch of the railroad ran between Wheeling and Wellsburg, going east to the Pennsylvania towns of Washington or West Middletown. The McKeever family of West Middletown would hide fugitives in their poultry wagon and drive them to Pittsburgh. The A.M.E. Zion Church in Wheeling was also active in aiding slaves to freedom. The proprietor of the Wheeling House Hotel was rumored to find safe houses for runaways. The hotel was next door to the slave auction block.

In 1835 slaveowners in Jefferson County petitioned the General Assembly for redress for the loss of runaway slaves. In response, the General Assembly passed an act incorporating "The Virginia Slave Insurance Company" in Charlestown. The Fugitive Slave Act returned a number of slaves to western Virginia. Just before the Civil War a slave belonging to the Jackson family in Harrison County escaped to Ohio by stealing a horse, but was returned under the act and sold lower south. One of the last slaves ever returned under the act was Sara Lucy Bagby, who had also escaped to Ohio and was restored to her owner in Wheeling on January 24, 1861. Sara Bagby was freed during the war and moved to Pittsburgh. Slaves who ran away and were returned, or at risk of flight, were often sold. In 1856 in Point Pleasant, Mason County, two slaveholders sold their eighteen slaves for $10,600 (~$287,898 in 2024) to a Richmond dealer when it was discovered that they had been planning an escape. A slave owner in Kanwaha County sent his remaining slaves to Natchez for sale after two had run away.

== War ==
When the Indiana and Ohio state troops under command of Gen. George B. McClellan invaded West Virginia on May 26, 1861, Gen. McClellan issued a proclamation "To the Union Men of Western Virginia" in which he stated "Notwithstanding all that has been said by the traitors to induce you to believe that our advent among you will be signalized by interference with your slaves, understand one thing clearly—not only will we abstain from all such interference, but we will, on the contrary, with an iron hand, crush any attempt at insurrection on their part." Writing in his journal on January 3, 1862, in Fayetteville future president Col. Rutherford B. Hayes noted, "Nobody in this army thinks of giving to the Rebels their fugitive slaves. Union men might perhaps be differently dealt with-probably would be."

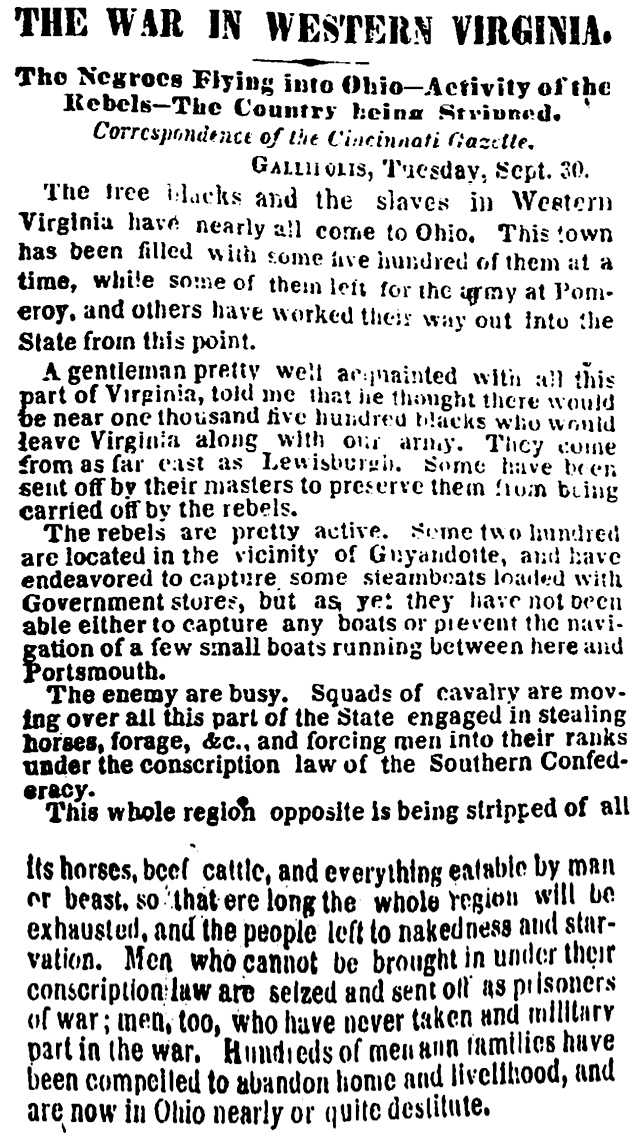
Article from The New York Times, October 6, 1862, escaped slaves from western Virginia fleeing to Ohio

The war provided an opportunity for large numbers of slaves to escape to Ohio and Pennsylvania. The Federal army considered escaped slaves to be contraband, or spoils of war. Some enlisted in the Federal army as part of the United States Colored Troops. Both the Federal and Confederate armies impressed some men into labor gangs, repairing railroads and bridges. Without the support of their spouses or former owners, women and children suffered greatly. Slave families endured depredation not only by raiding Union and Confederate soldiers, but also by partisan guerrillas, who were the most feared as they were the most likely to be violent. Reaching Union-held territory was not a guarantee of freedom, however. A slave named Preston, fleeing from Greenbrier county was arrested and placed in the Mason county jail on June 4, 1862, just by the Ohio river.

The war provided an impetus not only for slaves to escape but also to revolt. On May 27, 1861, in Lewisburg a slave named Reuben was convicted of conspiring "to rebel and make insurrection in said county." Pistols and other weapons were found in his cabin, and the court sentenced him to be hanged. A similar incident occurred in Mecklenburg County on May 21, 1861.

With Union troops securing the northern counties of western Virginia against Confederate defenders a Unionist government in Wheeling, called The Restored Government of Virginia, passed an ordinance for the creation of a new state from the western counties of Virginia. The voters who approved the ordinance on October 24, 1861, also elected members to a convention to write the constitution for the new state. The Constitutional Convention met in Wheeling on November 26, 1861, with 61 members. One of the issues facing them was slavery. Most were hoping that the Federal government would grant statehood without an emancipation clause to the constitution. Although some native Virginians, such as Methodist minister Robert Hager, favored gradual emancipation, much of the agitation for it came from the non-native delegates such as Gordon Battelle, William E. Stevenson, and Granville Parker. When Gordon Battelle proposed his emancipation clause Granville Parker recalled, "I discovered on that occasion as I never had before, the mysterious and over-powering influence 'the peculiar institution' had on men otherwise sane and reliable. Why, when Mr. Battelle submitted his resolutions, a kind of tremor—a holy horror, was visible throughout the house."

The convention, instead of incorporating an emancipation clause into the new constitution, included a clause forbidding freedmen and slaves from entering the new state and hoped this would be enough to satisfy Congress.

1860 Slave Census, 49 (of the 50) Counties of West Virginia
Ages	Slaves
<1	354
1–4	1,866
5–9	2,148
10–14	2,072
15–19	1,751
20–29	2,400
30–39	1,589
40–49	1,030
50–59	617
60–69	378
70–79	145
80–89	42
90–99	14
over 100	4
unknown	1

== Willey Amendment ==
The statehood bill was opposed by Senators Charles Sumner and Benjamin Wade, who insisted on emancipation in some form. On December 31, 1862, President Lincoln signed the West Virginia statehood bill on the condition that the new state provide some type of emancipation. Waitman T. Willey, a Senator of Virginia under the aegis of the Restored Government in Wheeling, composed an emancipation amendment to the constitution to be ratified by public vote on March 26, 1863. It became known as the Willey Amendment.

The Willey Amendment The children of slaves born within the limits of this State after the fourth day of July, eighteen hundred and sixty-three, shall be free; and all slaves within this state who shall, at the time aforesaid, be under the age of ten years, shall be free when they arrive at the age of twenty-one years; and all slaves over ten and under twenty-one years shall be free when they arrive at the age of twenty-five years; and no slave shall be permitted to come into the State for permanent residence therein.

On January 1, 1863, Lincoln issued the Emancipation Proclamation, which freed all the slaves in rebel territory that was not under Federal control. This exempted the 48 counties named in the statehood bill even though many of those counties were in active rebellion. Two more counties were added to West Virginia later in 1863, Jefferson and Berkeley. Slaves in Berkeley County were also exempted by the proclamation, but not those in Jefferson. Thus, 49 of West Virginia's 50 counties were exempted.

The Willey Amendment freed no slaves on West Virginia becoming a state: the first slaves to be freed would not have been so until 1867. There was no provision for freedom for any slave over 21 years of age. As per the census of 1860 the Willey Amendment would have left at least 40% of West Virginia's slaves unemancipated, over 6,000 slaves. Many of those under 21 would have served as much as 20 years in slavery. The phrasing of the amendment also created a window of two weeks during which the children of slaves born between June 20, 1863, and July 4, 1863, would be born into slavery.

The Willey Amendment was approved by public vote and on April 20, 1863. President Lincoln issued a proclamation that West Virginia had met all requirements and would become a state on June 20, 1863. In anticipation of the passage of the Thirteenth Amendment to the United States Constitution the Wheeling legislature passed a bill ending slavery in West Virginia on February 3, 1865. Even so, the impact of the legislative emancipation act was not immediately understood. The Clarksburg Weekly National Telegraph was still printing fugitive slave ads in March.

== Reconstruction ==
The end of the war and emancipation brought both jubilation and anxiety, many not knowing how to restructure their lives. At emancipation some slaveowners reacted by evicting all former slaves from their properties, others negotiated work contracts or sharecropping arrangements. Since few of these agreements were legally contracted, and the newly freed slaves had little access to the legal system, they were often victimized. Former Kanawha County slave Lizzie Grant explained,

Slavery had not ended, no we just went from slaves to peons ... They did free them in one sense of the word, but put them in a whole lot worse shape as they turned them loose to make their own way with nothing to make it with ... [W]e mostly had to stay with our [former owners] if we got anything ... [W]e were forced to stay on as servants, yes, if we expected to live ... [T]hey still made us do just like they wanted to after the war.

In 1866 the state legislature gave blacks the right to testify against whites in court. Before this, they had been allowed to testify only in cases involving black defendants. In 1867 the Fourteenth Amendment was ratified, granting citizenship and the right to due process under the law.

As a Union state West Virginia was exempt from most of the strictures of Reconstruction. The charter which created the Freedmen's Bureau, however, stated their jurisdiction as "all subjects relating to refugees and freedmen from rebel States, or from any district of country within the territory embraced in operations of the army."

Schools were established by the Bureau in Harper's Ferry and Martinsburg in September 1865 and others later in Charlestown and Shepherdstown. Except for the school in Martinsburg, the others were met with resistance and harassment.

In 1862 Parkersburg became the first city to have established a school for black children. By 1867 there were two schools in existence, one public school with a white teacher, and a private school run by R.H. Robinson. Some parents preferred the private school, believing the public school to be too sectarian.

Except for the eastern panhandle the Kanawha Valley had the highest number of black residents. When the Bureau visited the area in 1867 it discovered five schools already established by black citizens, several of them by the Rev. Lewis Rice. The Bureau found the quality of teaching to be good but the physical structures very poor. Local school boards refused or sometimes delayed appropriating funds for new buildings. In Brook's Hollow the Bureau provided $300 and black residents $323 for a new schoolhouse.

At White Sulphur Springs in Greenbrier County a local resident donated land for a new building and the Bureau supplied $177.10 for building supplies and black residents raised the rest of the money. In Lewisburg in early 1868 the school board provided a building through the combined efforts of the Bureau and black residents.

The most notable accomplishment of the Freedmen's Bureau was its efforts in the establishment of Storer College in Harper's Ferry. Spurred by a grant from John Storer of Stanford, Maine, which was conditional on matching funds, the Bureau facilitated the appropriation of government buildings in Harper's Ferry and 7 acres (28,000 m^{2}) of land. The Bureau also contributed $18,000 to the establishment of the college. On December 3, 1868, Congress passed a bill transferring the property to the college.

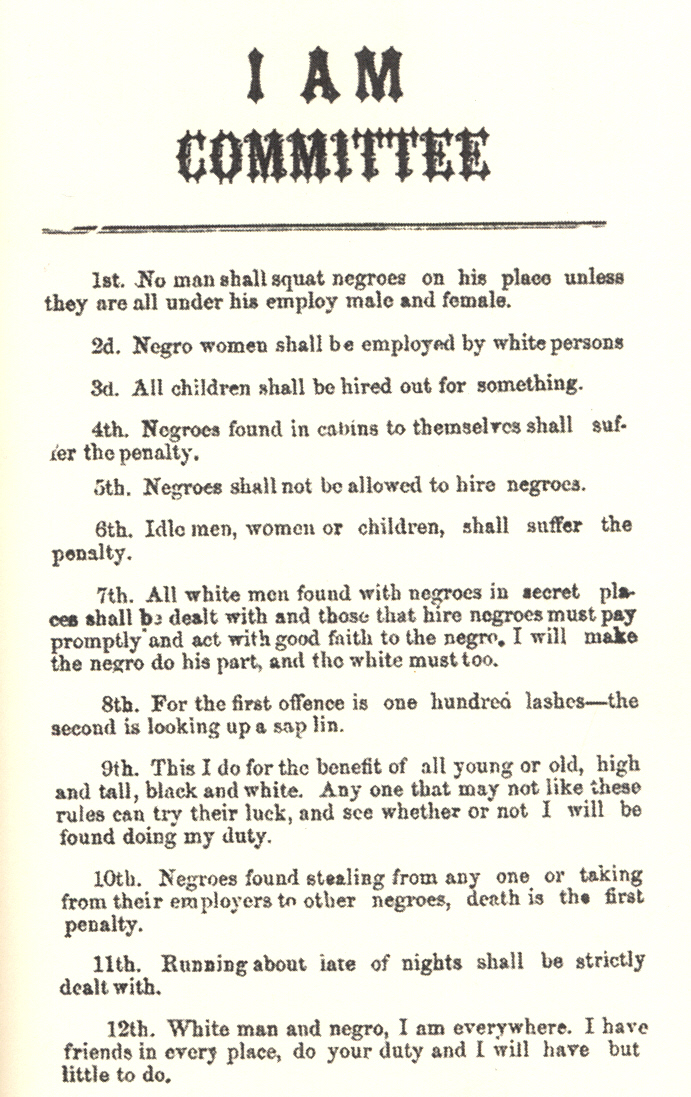
1867 West Virginia Ku Klux Klan broadside

By 1868 the Ku Klux Klan had organized klavens in West Virginia. Lizzie Grant recalled-"There was them KKK's to say that we must do just like our white man tell us, if we did not, they would take the poor helpless negro and beat him up good." In Colliers a white mob broke up a black political meeting, identifying members for later klan discipline. In Harper's Ferry, a crowd stoned a black school and assaulted teachers.

When the state of West Virginia was created from fifty western counties of Virginia in 1863 it was done without the participation of most of its citizens. At the end of the war the Wheeling government found it necessary in order to stay in power to strip former Confederates and supporters of their civil rights – the right to vote, sit on juries, teach, practice law, or hold public office. The introduction of the Fifteenth Amendment to the United States Constitution in 1869, intended to extend the vote to black male citizens, provided an opportunity for disfranchised whites to regain their rights. Federal judge John Jay Jackson, Jr., whose family had suffered politically under the Wheeling government, ruled that the 15th Amendment applied to all male citizens regardless of color and ordered the arrest of any state registrar who denied a male resident the right to vote. As a result, thousands of Confederate veterans and supporters were enrolled on the voting lists.

By 1871 the Wheeling government had lost power and their state constitution was discarded by a public referendum. A new state constitution was written in 1872 under the chairmanship of Samuel Price, former Confederate Lt. Governor of Virginia. By 1876 seven of the eight successful candidates for state offices, including the governorship, had been in the Confederate army. Francis H. Pierpont, the "Father of West Virginia", lost his seat in the House of Delegates.

Although the new constitution guaranteed blacks the right to vote and hold public office, it provided for separate schooling and forbade the teaching of blacks and whites in the same school. In 1873 the legislature limited jury duty to white males.

== Civil rights ==
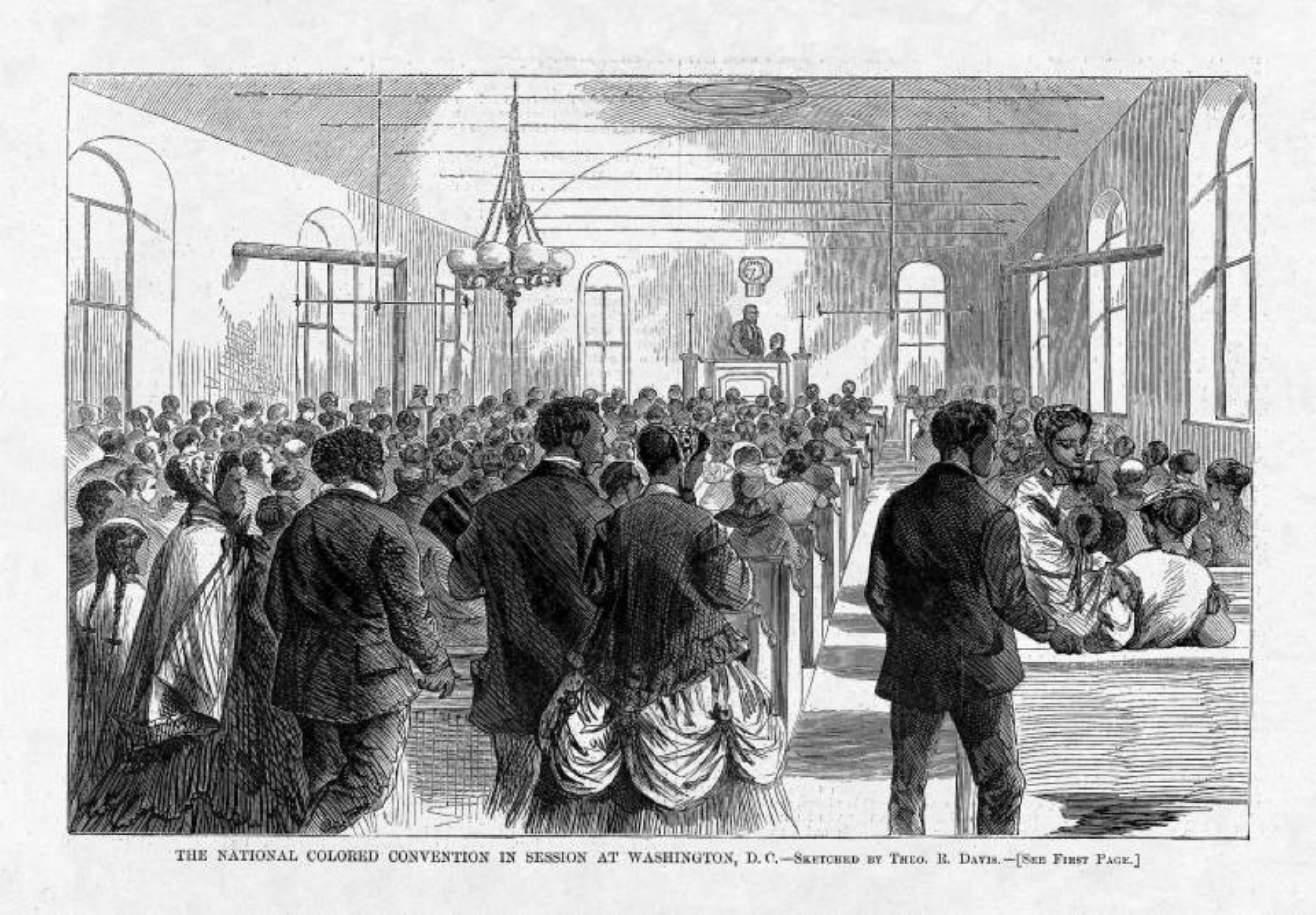
The National Convention of Colored Men, Washington, D.C., January 13, 1869

After the war, some black West Virginians had organized politically. In June 1868, a group of 60 black Republicans from Kentucky, Maryland, Missouri, Delaware and West Virginia met in Baltimore. Some of the West Virginia delegates were the Rev. Dudly Asbury, William Thomas, and George Trother. They met again in Baltimore in August as the Colored Border State Convention, and West Virginian Adam Howard was chosen as one of the vice-presidents. The convention issued a call for a national convention to meet in January to discuss enfranchisement. At the Union League Hall in Washington, D.C., on January 13, 1869, the National Convention of Colored Men convened with over 200 members, including Frederick Douglass. The emphasis was on gaining the vote, though issues of work, housing and education were all discussed. The convention helped focus Congressional attention on the Fifteenth Amendment, which became law in 1870.

In 1879, the U.S. Supreme Court ruled in Strauder v. West Virginia that the state had "failed to permit blacks the right to serve as jurors along with its other obligations in qualifying them for citizenship."

Issues concerning slavery continued to surface in legal cases after the end of the war. In 1878, a case between Thomas L. Feamster and James Withrow was taken to the state supreme court concerning slaves which had been purchased with Confederate currency. In 1909, the state of West Virginia claimed the value of slaves who had been subjected to capital punishment by the Virginia government in a suit involving adjustments of the pre-war Virginia Debt.

== See also ==
- List of plantations in West Virginia
- History of slavery in the United States by state
