= Christian Allemong House =

Historic house in West Virginia, United States

- U.S. National Register of Historic Places
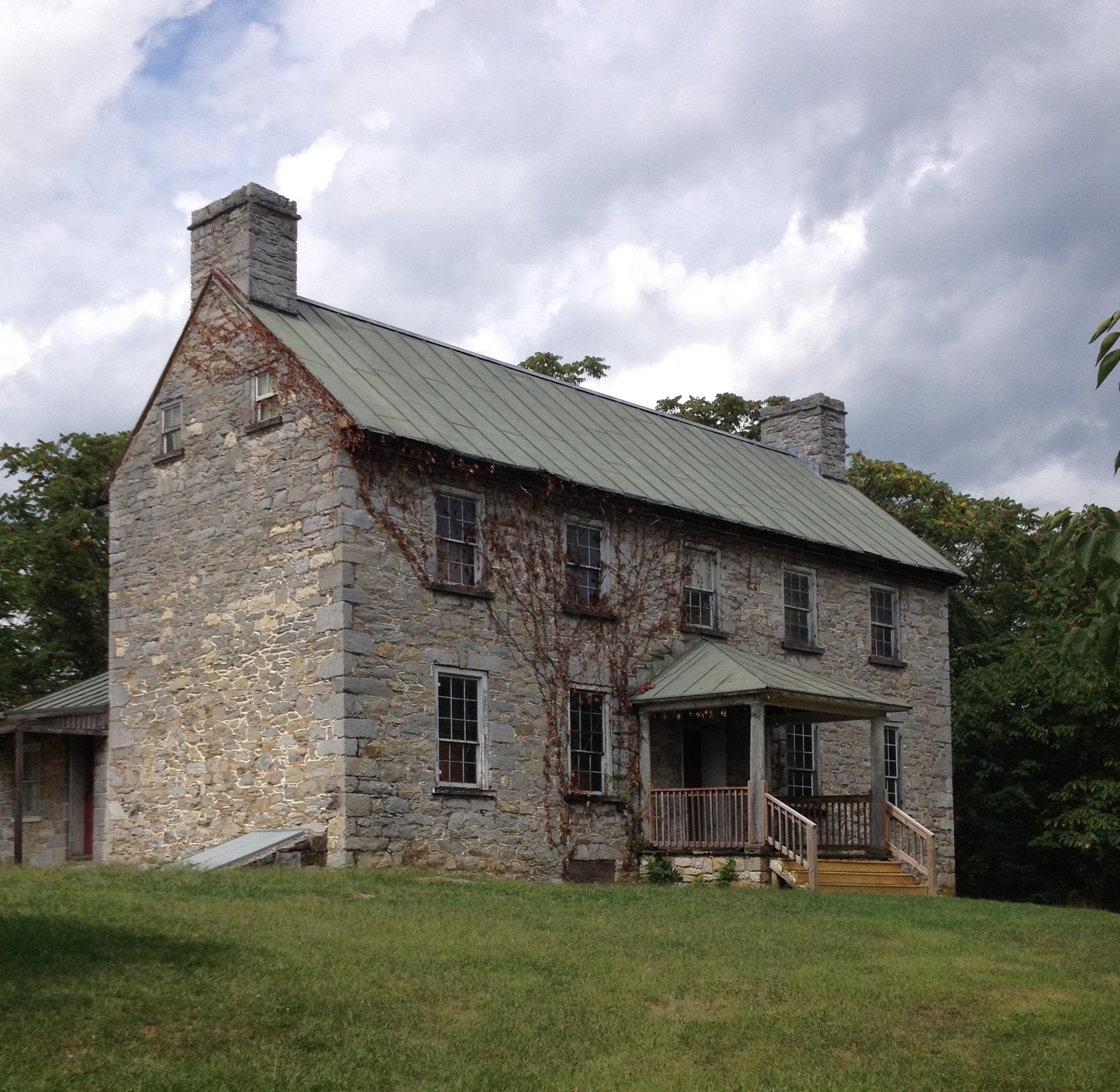
- Christian Allemong House in 2019

- Location within West Virginia Location within the United States
- Nearest city: Summit Point, West Virginia
- Coordinates: 39°14′14″N 77°58′43″W
- Built: 1830
- NRHP reference No.: 03000346
- Added to NRHP: May 2, 2003

The Christian Allemong House (also known as the Amos Janney House) is located near Summit Point, West Virginia.

== Description and history ==
The house was built around 1830 in the Georgian style with Greek Revival detailing. The house was owned by Amos Janney from 1848 to 1868. During the American Civil War, it is believed that Union soldiers wintered in the area to the north of the house, digging four wells, of which one survives. A local belief describes the nearby community of Jamestown as the former slave quarters of the Allemong property. The house is located on property that is now part of Summit Point Motorsports Park. Some renovation appears to have been done, for example, central air conditioning units are visible outside the house.
