= Edward Tabb House =

Historic house in West Virginia, United States

- U.S. National Register of Historic Places
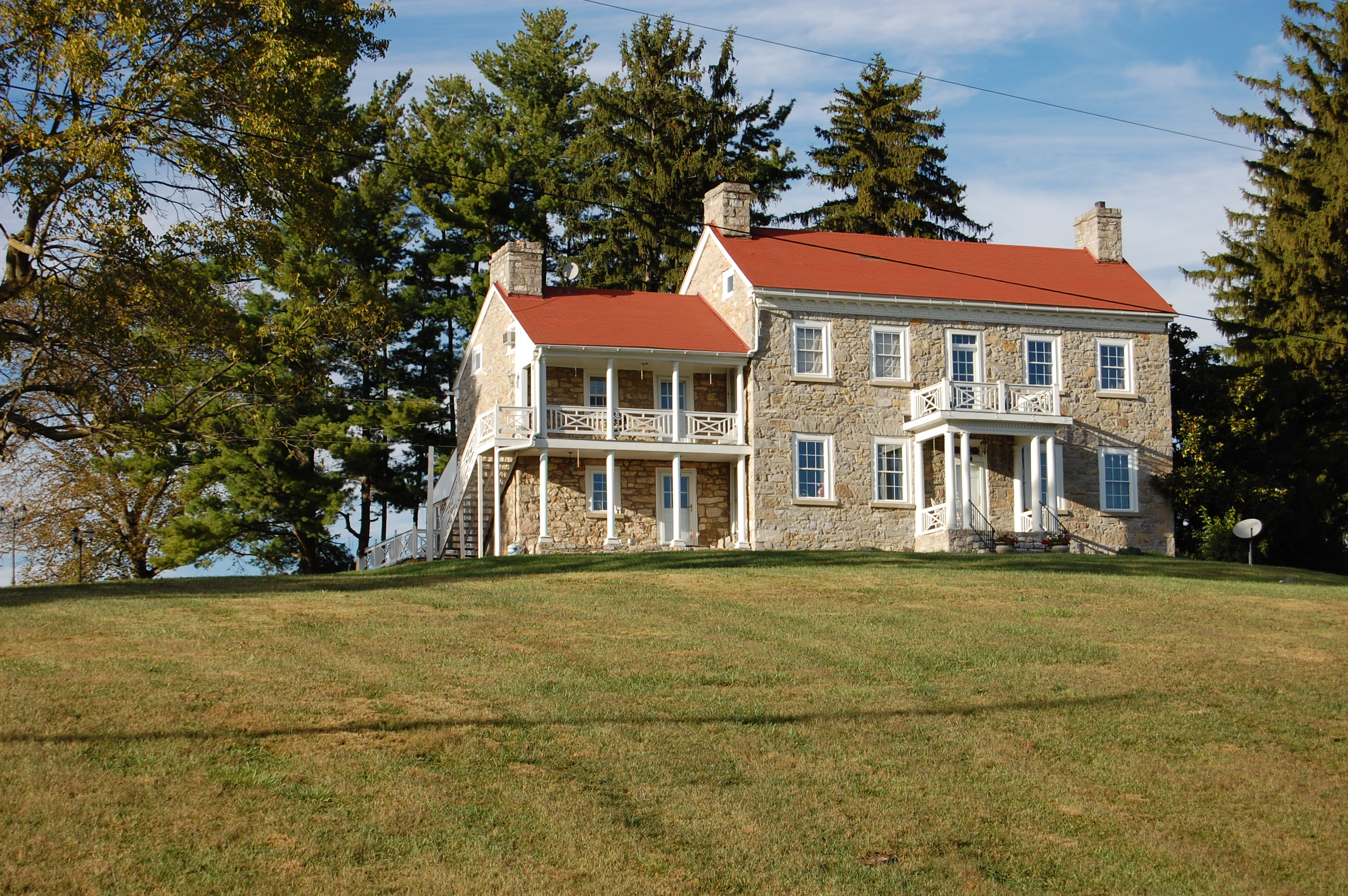

- Location within West Virginia Location within the United States
- Location: On CR 4 S of jct. with WV 9, near Hedgesville, West Virginia
- Coordinates: 39°30′55″N 78°0′5″W
- Area: 1 acre (0.40 ha)
- Built: 1810
- Architect: Tabb, Edward; Tabb, John
- Architectural style: Federal
- NRHP reference No.: 84003500
- Added to NRHP: January 12, 1984

Edward Tabb House, also known as "Rural Hill," is a historic home located near Hedgesville, Berkeley County, West Virginia. It was built about 1810 and is a large Federal style rubble limestone dwelling consisting of a central block with wing. The rear section was added about 1820. The house measures 37 feet deep and 62 feet across. The entrance features a porch with paired Doric order columns and a Chippendale-style transom.

It was listed on the National Register of Historic Places in 1984.
