= Lick Run Plantation =

Historic house in West Virginia, United States

- U.S. National Register of Historic Places
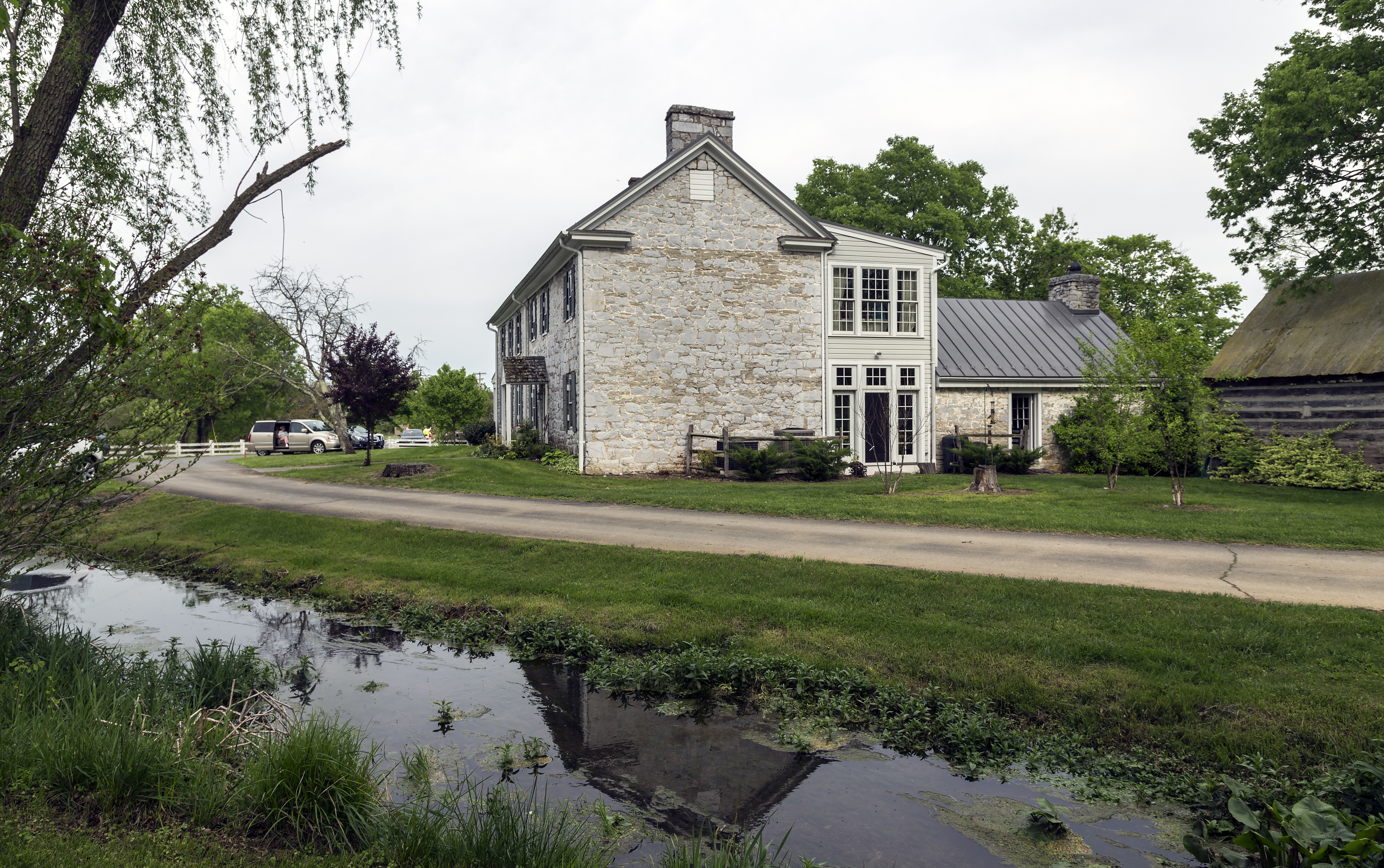
- Lick Run Plantation in 2017

- Location within West Virginia Location within the United States
- Location: Off U.S. Route 11, Bedington, West Virginia
- Coordinates: 39°31′10″N 77°54′2″W
- Area: 5 acres (2.0 ha)
- Built: 1774
- Architectural style: Georgian
- NRHP reference No.: 84003476
- Added to NRHP: January 12, 1984

Lick Run Plantation is a historic home and related outbuildings located at Bedington, Berkeley County, West Virginia. The complex consists of a two-story stone dwelling, stone kitchen, and stone barn and corn crib. They were built after Peter Light purchased the property in 1770. Also on the property are a log house built before 1770, and the stone Bedinger Mill. The mill building was built about 1816.

It was listed on the National Register of Historic Places in 1984.
