= Jamestown, West Virginia =

- Unincorporated community
- Location within West Virginia Location within the United States
- Coordinates: 39°14′29″N 77°59′3″W
- Country: United States
- State: West Virginia
- County: Jefferson
- Time zone: UTC-5 (Eastern (EST))
  - Summer (DST): UTC-4 (EDT)
- ZIP codes: 85446
- GNIS feature ID: 1549759

Jamestown is an unincorporated community in Jefferson County, West Virginia, United States. Jamestown lies near the Clarke County, Virginia border on County Route 2 southwest of Summit Point.
