= Altona (West Virginia) =

Historic house in West Virginia, United States

- U.S. National Register of Historic Places
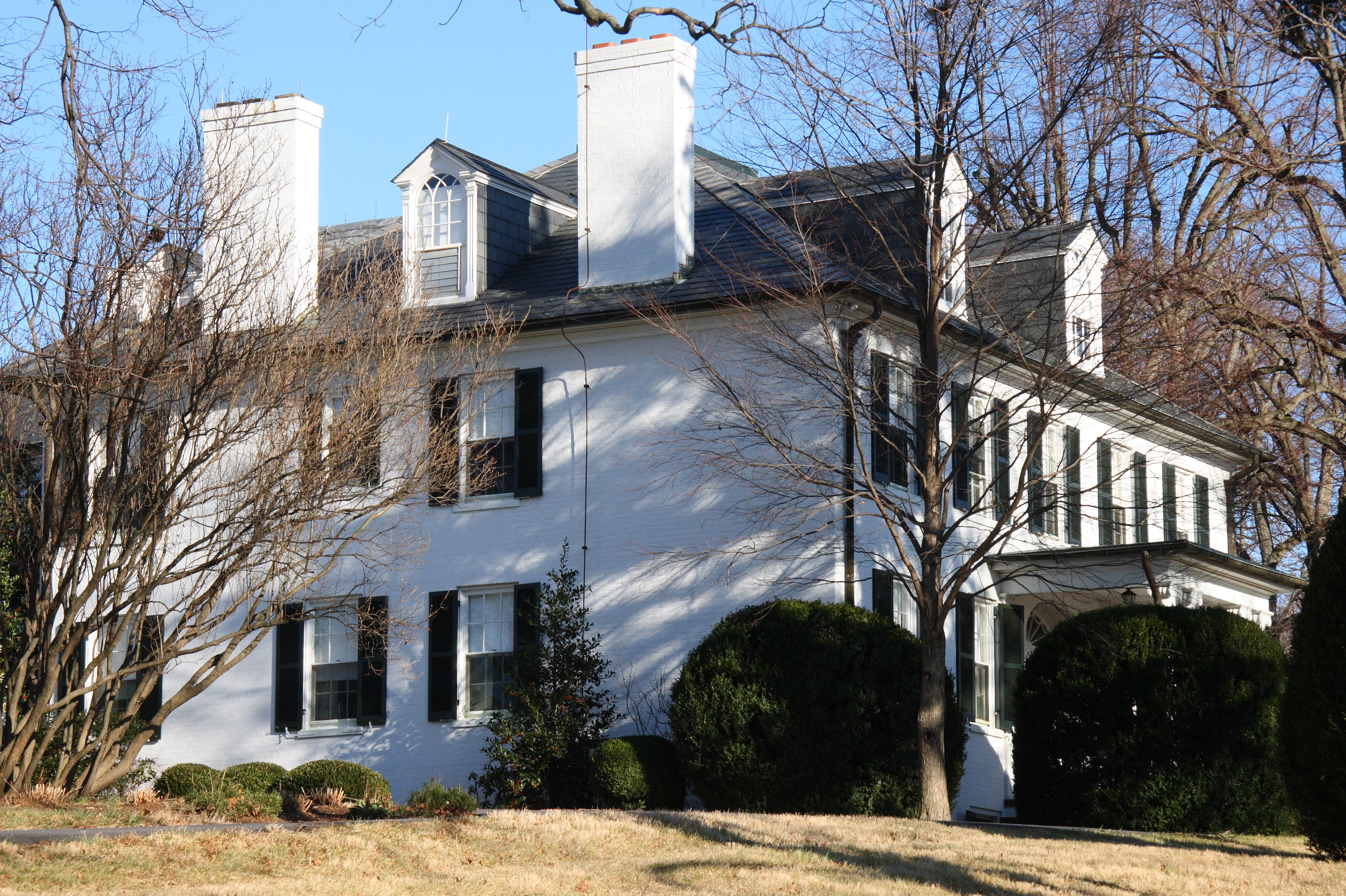

- Location within West Virginia Location within the United States
- Location: Jefferson County, West Virginia, USA
- Nearest city: Charles Town, West Virginia
- Coordinates: 39°17′24″N 77°52′57″W
- Built: 1793
- Architect: Davenport, Maj. Abraham, Jr.; Davenport, H.B., Jr.
- Architectural style: Federal
- NRHP reference No.: 95001322
- Added to NRHP: November 24, 1995

Altona, near Charles Town, West Virginia, is a historic farm with an extensive set of subsidiary buildings. The original Federal style plantation house was built in 1793 by Revolutionary War officer Abraham Davenport on land purchased from Charles Washington. The house was expanded by Abraham's son, Colonel Braxton Davenport. During the Civil War the farm was a favored encampment. Generals Philip Sheridan and Ulysses S. Grant both used the house as a headquarters and meeting place.

The farm was sold out of the Davenport family in 1906, but repurchased in 1936. In the interim, a Sears, Roebuck house was added to the property.

== History ==
Major Abraham Davenport, Sr.'s 1793 house was a wood-frame structure built on land purchased from Charles Washington, adjoining several Washington family homes, including Blakeley, Claymont Court and Harewood. Davenport became a Jefferson County magistrate in 1801, and was sheriff in 1803. His son, Colonel Braxton Davenport took over the farm in 1830. Col. Davenport added the present brick front to the original house, as well as the impressive stone fence that lines the road between Charles Town and Middleway. The house was named at this time for Mrs. Davenport's family home in Germany.

Colonel Davenport, who had served in the U.S. Army during the War of 1812, followed his father as Jefferson County magistrate, and arraigned John Brown in his court in 1859. Braxton Davenport was also a Virginia state legislator, serving four terms.

During the Civil War, Altona became a favorite headquarters for Union and Confederate forces. The front drawing rooms were used for conferences, and Sheridan used the farm's horses and carriage. Altona was therefore saved from the destruction that overtook other nearby estates. Altona served as a refuge when nearby Locust Hill was the scene of fighting and destroyed.

Colonel Davenport's son, Henry Bedinger Davenport had served as a lieutenant of militia in the company that captured John Brown. He served in a similar unit in the Confederate Army. Henry continued to operate the farm after his father's death and extended the stone fence. He died in 1901 . The family sold the farm in 1906. Between 1906 and the re-purchase of the property by Henry Davenport, Jr. the barn was doubled in size and a Sears, Roebuck house was built on the property next to the mansion house. The house remains in the Davenport family.

== Description ==
=== Main house ===
The main house is a two-story five-bay brick house, painted white on a local limestone foundation, with a hipped slate roof. The roof was raised in 1936 and dormers were added. Paired chimneys rise on the east and west sides. The weatherboard 1793 house remains as the rear portion of the main house, but was clad in brick in 1936. The 1936 renovation also added formal entry porches on the south and east sides. Windows are typically six-over-six double-hung sashes with brick flat arches.

The interior is oriented around a center hall leading to the kitchen at the rear. The hall is entered through the south porch door, which is topped by a leaded glass fanlight. Two symmetrical living rooms flank the hall at the front. The 1793 portion of the house contains a reception room and a dining room. The second floor is arranged in the same manner as the first, with rooms, doors and fireplaces in the same locations. The main stair continues to the attic. The basement contains a similar room arrangement to the first floor, with fireplaces in the rooms.

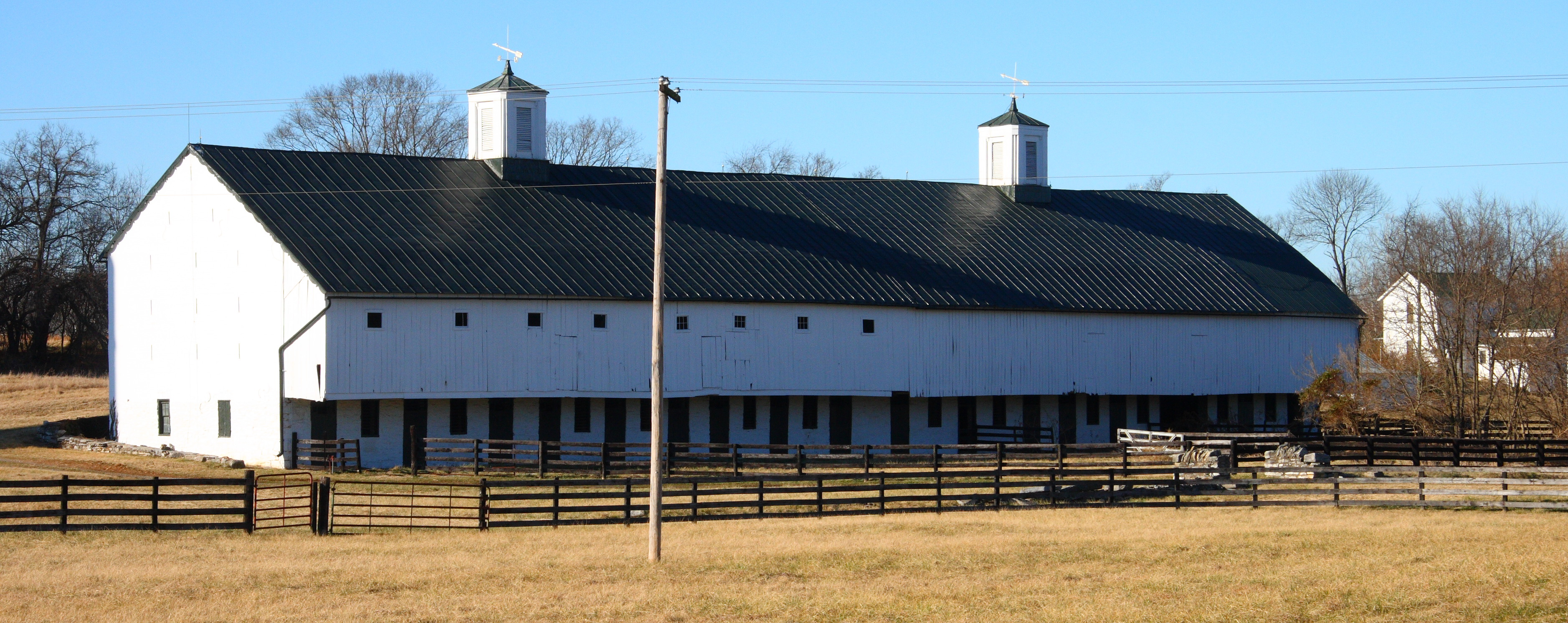
Altona bank barn

=== Bank barn ===
The 198 feet (60 m) long bank barn is built on a cut local limestone foundation, with weatherboard forebay and upper level. Two large square cupolas are placed over old and new sections of the barn. The original brick gable of the old barn remains in the interior where the old and new sections join. Stalls are found in the old section, while the newer section is a large loafing shed.

=== Sears Roebuck house ===
The Sears house to the west of the main house is an American Foursquare, listed in the Sears catalog as "Dream House." The two-story hipped-roof house stands on a local limestone foundation. A plaque in one of the brick piers at the front reads "Dream House 1920."

=== Garage/Guest house ===
The 1936 garage is two stories, with a basement. A 1967 addition added expanded guest quarters and altered the interiors."

=== Accessory structures ===
Other structures on the property include a late 19th-century limestone outhouse, early 19th-century frame slave quarters, a late 19th-century brick smokehouse, and two mid-19th-century corncribs. Several other buildings and structures contribute to the ensemble."
