= Mill Island (Moorefield, West Virginia) =

Historic house in West Virginia, United States

- U.S. National Register of Historic Places
- Location within Eastern Panhandle of West Virginia Location within West Virginia Location within the United States
- Location: South of Moorefield, near Moorefield, West Virginia
- Coordinates: 39°2′22″N 78°57′38″W
- Area: 1 acre (0.40 ha)
- Built: 1798, 1840
- Architect: Felix Seymour
- Architectural style: Greek Revival
- MPS: South Branch Valley MRA
- NRHP reference No.: 73001904
- Added to NRHP: July 2, 1973

Mill Island, also known as the Seymour Family House, is a historic home located near Moorefield, Hardy County, West Virginia. The original brick cottage was built in 1798. In 1840, a two-story, brick Greek Revival style mansion was appended. The 3 1/2-story building features a one bay, temple style entrance porch and a "widow's walk" on the roof peak. The porch columns are in the Corinthian order. The interior features a great ballroom, reception hall, parlors, and a huge dining room. During the American Civil War, it was used as a hospital by the McNeill's Rangers.

It was listed on the National Register of Historic Places in 1973.
