= York Hill =

Historic house in West Virginia, United States

- U.S. National Register of Historic Places
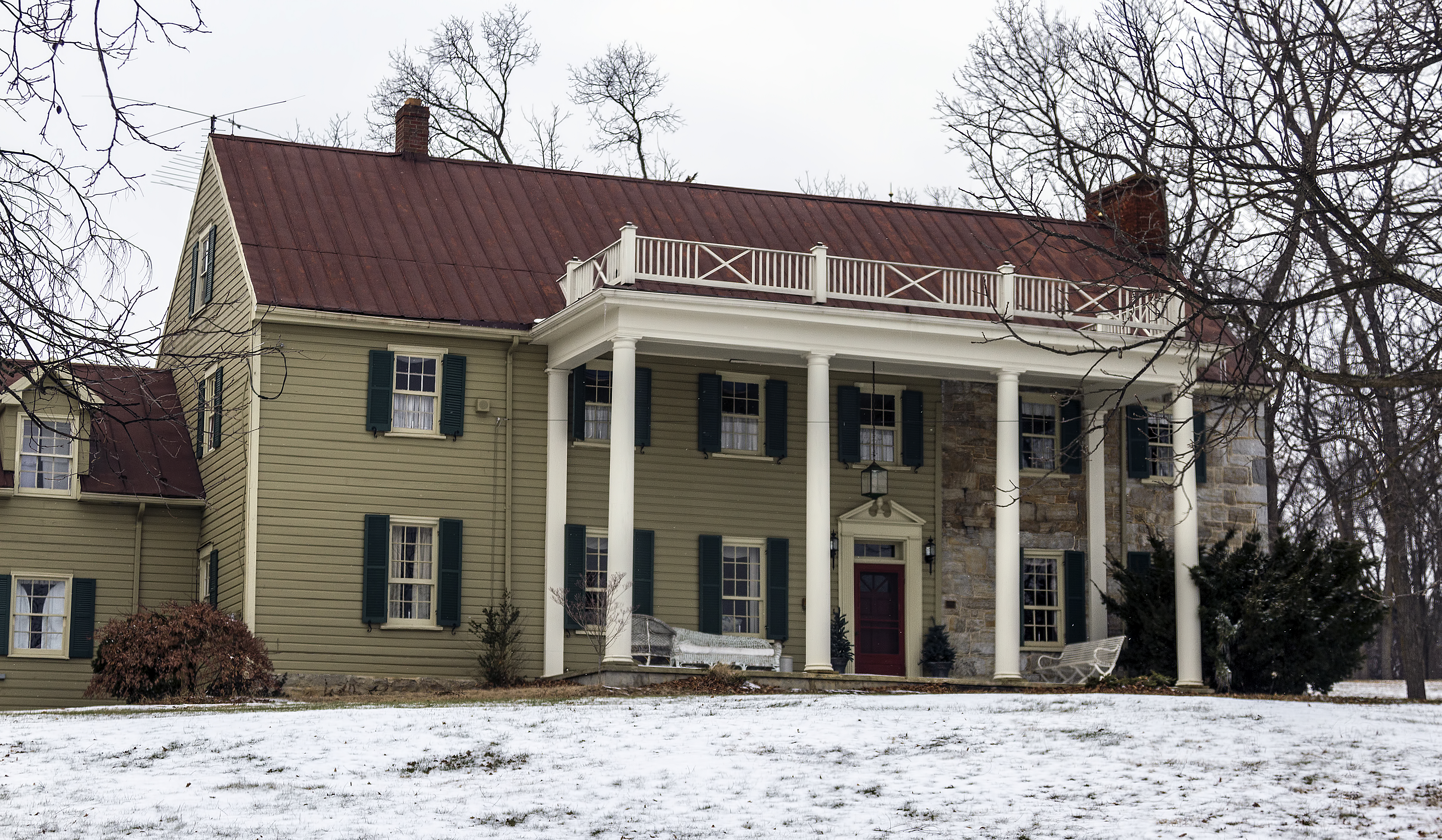

- Location within West Virginia Location within the United States
- Nearest city: Shenandoah Junction, West Virginia
- Coordinates: 39°22′36″N 77°50′47″W
- Architectural style: Federal
- NRHP reference No.: 06000654
- Added to NRHP: July 26, 2006

York Hill, near Shenandoah Junction, West Virginia is a historic property listed on the National Register of Historic Places. The original log portion of the house was built in the mid-1750s by Samuel Darke on a 360-acre (150 ha) tract conveyed by Thomas Fairfax, 6th Lord Fairfax of Cameron in 1754. The farm passed into the ownership of Colonel James Hendricks in 1762. Upon Colonel Hendricks' death in 1795, the farm was sold into ownership of the Snyder family. Due to heavy tax debt, the Snyder's lost the farm and Robert Hockensmith purchased it in 1939 in partnership with Milton Burr. Mr. Hockensmith later bought out Mr. Burr's share and transferred ownership of the property to his daughter, Mary Frances (Hockensmith) Hockman, upon her marriage in 1955. Upon Ms. Hockman's death in 2007, her son, Gordon Hockman, became the current owner.

York Hill began as a farm consisting of livestock, grains, and tobacco. The Snyder's began to develop the farm as an apple/fruit orchard, and the Hockensmiths and Hockmans fully developed the commercial potential of the York Hill orchards which still operate today.

Several additions have been made to the house since its humble origins as a simple two-storied log cabin. An extended two-storied wing was added in the late 1790s to include separate living quarters for another family member. A limestone addition to the house and other various stone out-buildings were built between 1802 and 1825, including the 1812 bank barn that is host to many weddings and receptions today. The last additions, to include the stately columned-front porch and west wing, were built in 1972 by Jerry Hockman.
