= Maidstone-on-the-Potomac =

Historic house in West Virginia, United States

- U.S. National Register of Historic Places
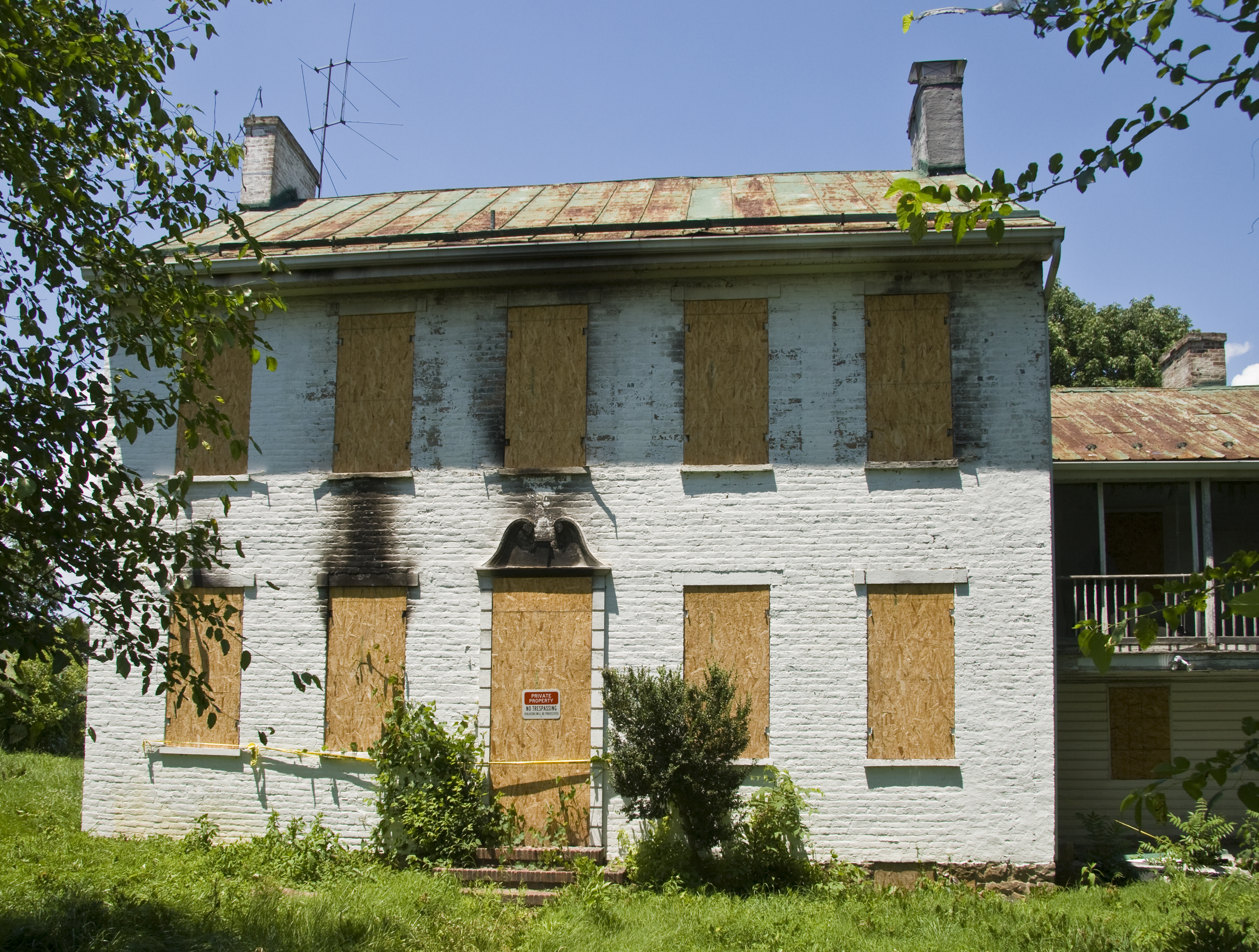
- Maidstone-on-the-Potomac after a fire (2009)

- Location within West Virginia Location within the United States
- Location: Berkeley County, West Virginia, USA
- Nearest city: Williamsport, Maryland
- Coordinates: 39°36′01.08″N 77°50′00.89″W
- Built: 1741
- Architectural style: Federal
- NRHP reference No.: 04000311
- Added to NRHP: April 15, 2004

Maidstone-on-the-Potomac is a historic house and farm near Falling Waters, West Virginia. Located on the Potomac River immediately opposite Williamsport, Maryland, the property consists of a 218-acre (88 ha) tract with a main house dating from c. 1741. The house was built by Evan Watkins, who operated Watkins Ferry on the Potomac, which was used by George Washington and General Edward Braddock.

In 1795 the property was sold to Peter Light. The Light family retained the property until 1854, substantially expanding the house. The ferry and house, by now known as Light's Ferry passed to Robert Lemen, who converted the ferry into a cable ferry.

In 1861 the ferry was used by Union forces under Captain Abner Doubleday to cross into Virginia for raids. In 1863 Doubleday again crossed the river by fording while pursuing Robert E. Lee's Army of Northern Virginia as it advanced on Gettysburg. A month later, following Lee's defeat, 70,000 confederate soldiers crossed at Lemen's Ferry.

In the late 19th century the first bridge crossing was built at this location. Today, US 11 crosses here, bisecting the property.

The Watkins Family also became associated with the Boone Family during the time of their ownership of the Ferry. A great-great grandson, John Watkins (His father John T Watkins was born at Watkins Ferry), of the original Evan Watkins married Elizabeth Karn, a 1st and 2nd cousin of Daniel Boone's. Elizabeth was the daughter of Christopher Karn and Leah Boone.

John and Elizabeth's son Christopher Columbus Watkins married Rachel Bristow who was the granddaughter of Leah's sister, Hannah Boone.

== Fire ==
Maidstone-on-the-Potomac was damaged in a fire of suspicious origin the night of March 7, 2009, one of several similar fires in Berkeley County, West Virginia and Washington County, Maryland in a short span of days.
