= Jefferson County Alms House =

Historic house in West Virginia, United States

- U.S. National Register of Historic Places
- Location within West Virginia Location within the United States
- Nearest city: Leetown, West Virginia
- Coordinates: 39°20′7″N 77°54′30″W
- Built: c. 1813
- Architectural style: Federal
- NRHP reference No.: 95000418
- Added to NRHP: April 14, 1995

The Jefferson County Alms House, also known as Snow Hill Farm, located near Leetown, West Virginia, is an historic Federal style house. Snow Hill was built circa 1813 for John Hurst, son of James Hurst, a prosperous local landowner. In 1857, Snow Hill was purchased from the Hurst family for use as a farm for the local poor. By 1931 the Alms House (also known as the County Infirmary) had declined to the point that it had become a local disgrace. Corrective measures were taken, and the Infirmary survived until 1959, when its last nine inmates were moved to other quarters.

The property now houses a number of County agencies.
