= Elmwood (Shepherdstown, West Virginia) =

Historic house in West Virginia, United States

- U.S. National Register of Historic Places
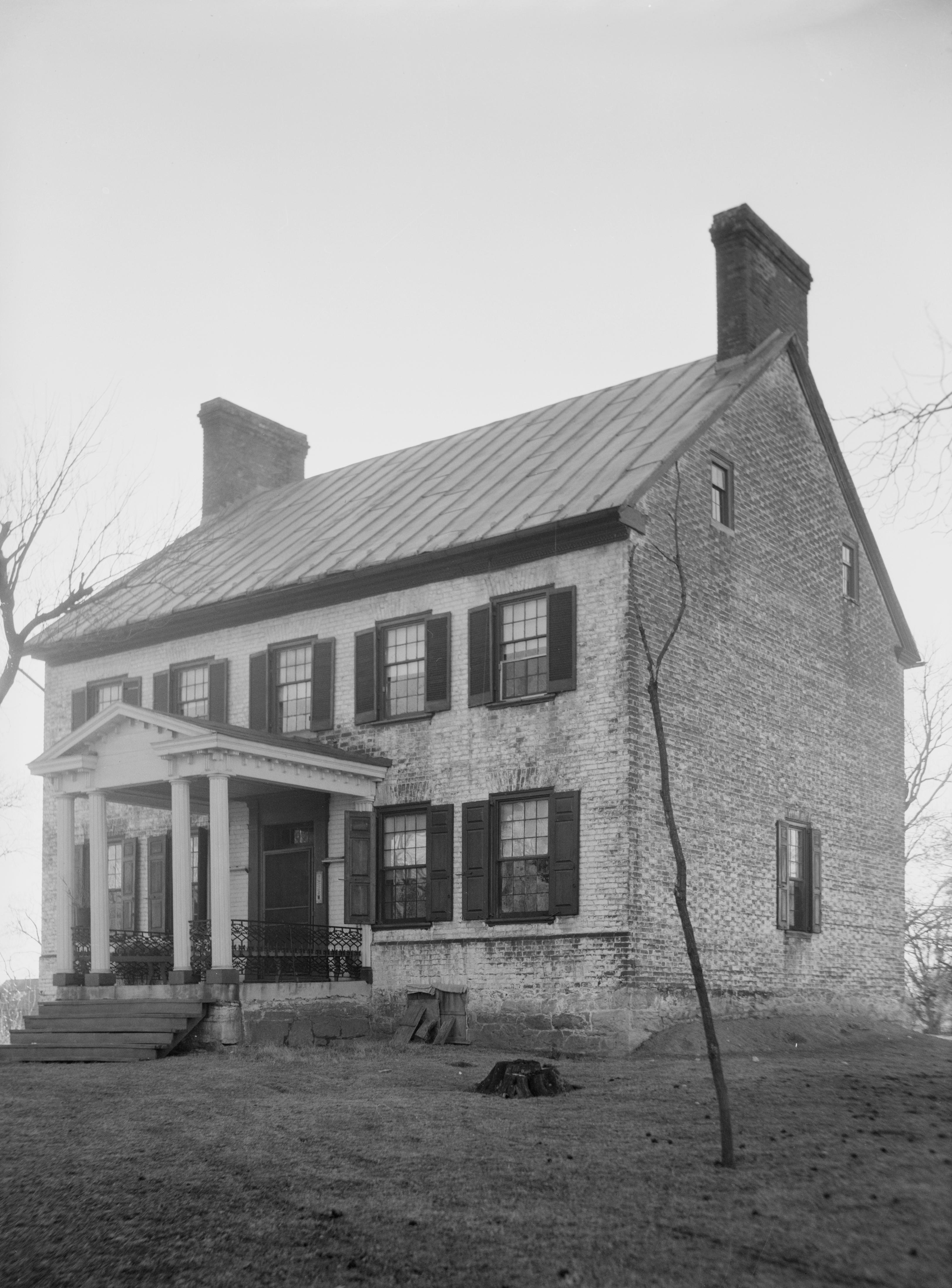
- Front of Elmwood

- Location within West Virginia Location within the United States
- Nearest city: Shepherdstown, West Virginia
- Coordinates: 39°23′50″N 77°48′50″W
- Built: 1797
- Architectural style: Federal
- NRHP reference No.: 73001918
- Added to NRHP: August 17, 1973

Elmwood is a Federal style house near Shepherdstown, West Virginia. Located on land claimed in 1732 by Edward Lucas II, it was built in 1797 by his son, Edward Lucas III. During the Civil War the house was used as a field hospital. It remained in the Lucas family until 1948.

The brick house is two stories over a raised basement, with a center-hall arrangement on both levels. The brick on the side and rear elevations has glazed headers. The house is unusual in the location of a side door in the dining room on the gable end. A portico with a new entry door was added in the nineteenth century.
