= Richwood Hall =

Historic house in West Virginia, United States

- U.S. National Register of Historic Places
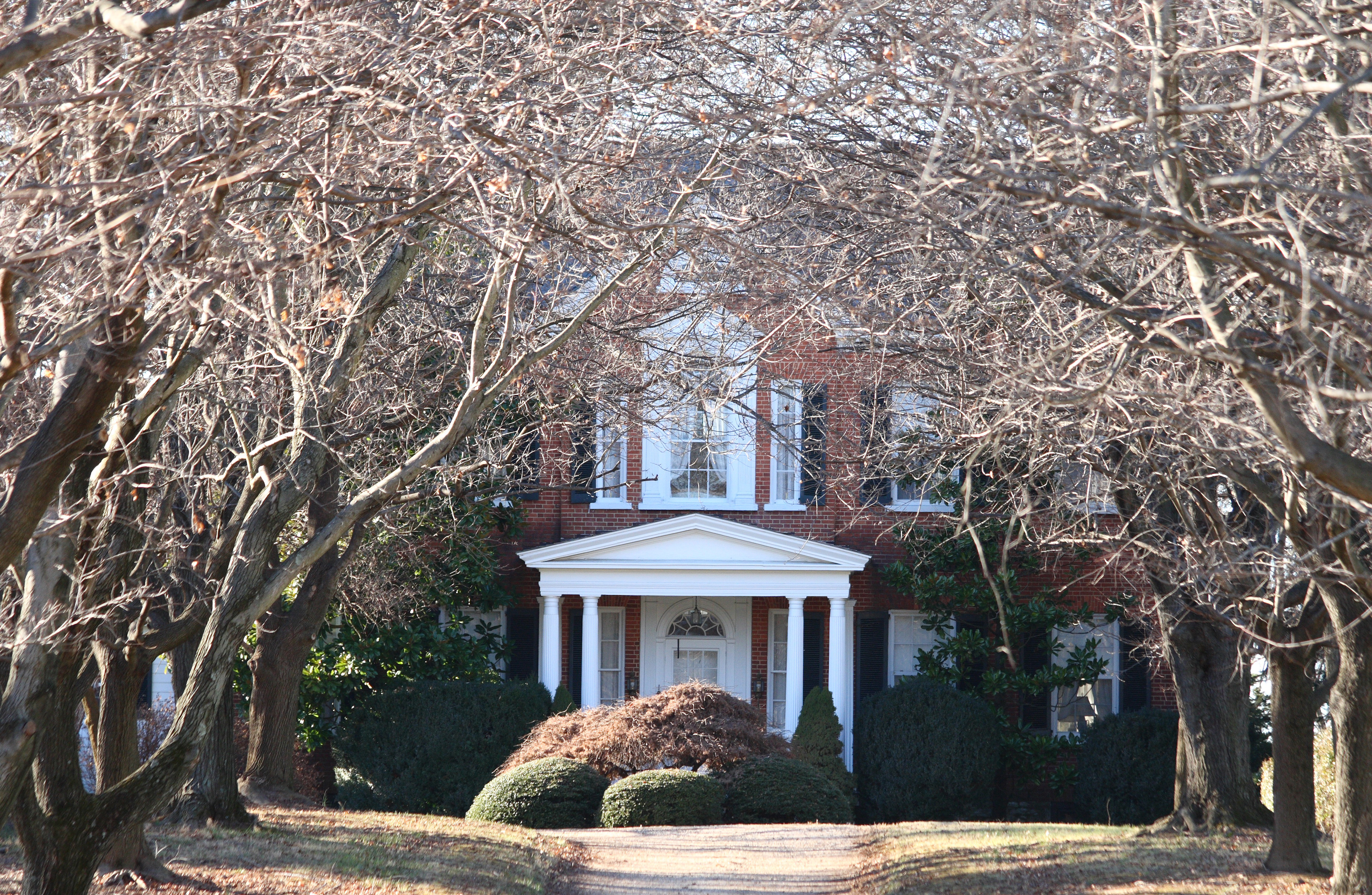

- Location within West Virginia Location within the United States
- Location: Charles Town, West Virginia
- Coordinates: 39°17′33″N 77°55′20″W
- Built: 1829
- NRHP reference No.: 73001911
- Added to NRHP: June 19, 1973

Richwood Hall, also known as Richwoods, is a house near Charles Town, West Virginia. The lands once belonged to George Washington, who received them from Thomas Fairfax, 6th Lord Fairfax of Cameron and subsequently gave to his brother, Samuel Washington. It was Samuel's son, Lawrence Augustine Washington, who built or moved into the house with his bride, Mary Dorcas Wood, in 1797. This original house now forms a wing of the present enlarged house. The Washingtons lived at Richwoods until 1802, when they sold the property to Smith Slaughter. By 1829 the house had been enlarged, either by Slaughter or his successor, Joseph Shewater. In any case, materials, including bricks and carved wood were imported from England.

At the time of the American Civil War the property belonged to John R. Flagg. Forces under the command of General Jubal A. Early fired from Richwood Hall at Union forces under Sheridan at Locust Hill.
