= Morgan Morgan Monument =

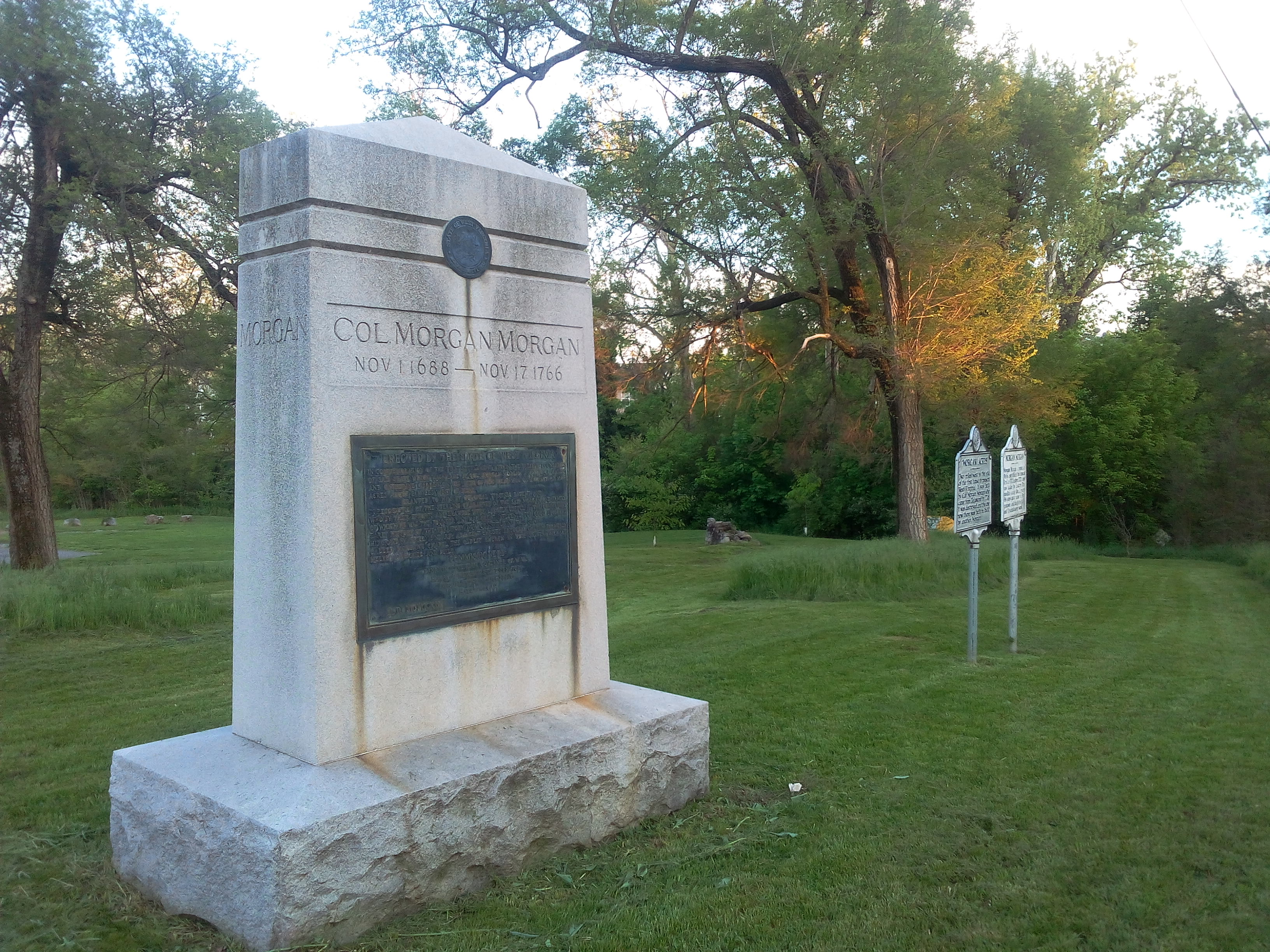
- Morgan Morgan Monument

- Location within Eastern Panhandle of West Virginia Location within West Virginia Location within the United States
- Location: Bunker Hill, Berkeley, West Virginia, United States
- Coordinates: 39°20′07″N 78°03′11″W
- Area: 1.05 acres (0.42 ha)
- Elevation: 549 ft (167 m)
- Established: 1924
- Named for: Morgan Morgan

The Morgan Morgan Monument, also known as Morgan Park, is a 1.05-acre (0.4 ha) roadside park in the unincorporated town of Bunker Hill in Berkeley County, West Virginia. It is located along Winchester Avenue (U.S. Route 11) and Mill Creek. The park features a granite monument that was erected in 1924 to memorialize Morgan Morgan (1688–1766), an American pioneer of Welsh descent, who was among the earliest European persons to settle permanently within the present-day boundaries of West Virginia.

The West Virginia Legislature appropriated funds for the construction of the Morgan Morgan Monument in 1923. West Virginia Governor and Morgan descendant Ephraim F. Morgan appointed and oversaw a committee of three people to plan and supervise the monument's construction: Haze Morgan, another Morgan descendant and the commission's chairperson; Blanche M. Pickering (Mrs. A. A. Pickering) of Rowlesburg; and West Virginia State Senator Harry P. Henshaw of Bunker Hill. A dedication and unveiling ceremony was held for the monument on September 13, 1924, and Governor Morgan served as the principal speaker.

Initially owned by the West Virginia Monuments Commission following the monument's establishment in 1924, the Morgan Morgan Monument was transferred to the West Virginia Road Commission, which maintained it as a roadside park from 1924 to 1956. From 1956 to 1970, the park was managed by the West Virginia Conservation Commission's Division of State Parks as a West Virginia state park. It was the only West Virginia state park ever to have been located within Berkeley County. The West Virginia Road Commission (now known as the West Virginia Division of Highways) resumed its operation of the Morgan Morgan Monument in 1970, and the division continues to maintain the monument as a roadside park. In 1980 the Morgan Morgan Monument and its park were included as a contributing property in the Mill Creek Historic District on the National Register of Historic Places.

== Geography and setting ==
The Morgan Morgan Monument, also known as Morgan Park, consists of a 1.05-acre (0.4 ha) park, the 1924 granite monument to Morgan Morgan, and two West Virginia highway markers immediately south of the monument. One highway marker features a brief biography of Morgan Morgan, and the other describes Morgan Acres, the possible location of the first structure built by Morgan as a crude shelter.

The monument is situated within the unincorporated town of Bunker Hill in Berkeley County, West Virginia. The monument's park is bound to its west by Winchester Avenue (U.S. Route 11) and the route's bridge over Mill Creek, to its north by a filling station parking lot, to its east by a gravel parking area, and to its south by Mill Creek, which flows from west to east into Opequon Creek. Several springs lie to the south of the monument along the southern edge of Mill Creek. The Morgan Morgan Monument is located 9.6 miles (15 km) southwest of Martinsburg and 11.9 miles (19 km) northeast of Winchester, Virginia; it is 3,256 feet (992 m) east of the Inwood Quarry.

- Morgan Morgan Monument
- U.S. Historic district – Contributing property
- Location: Winchester Avenue (U.S. Route 11), Bunker Hill, West Virginia
- Area: 1.05 acres (0.4 ha)
- Built: 1924
- Part of: Mill Creek Historic District (ID80004420)
- MPS: Berkeley County MRA
- Added to NRHP: December 10, 1980

The Morgan Morgan Monument lies within the Mill Creek Historic District near several Morgan family properties in the Bunker Hill and Gerrardstown areas listed on the National Register of Historic Places (NRHP). It is situated 1,279 feet (390 m) to the northeast of the interment sites of Morgan Morgan and the Morgan family at the Morgan Chapel and Graveyard on Runnymeade Road (West Virginia Secondary Route 26). Morgan's son David built a structure that became part of the Morgan-Gold House, which is 1.3 miles (2 km) west of the monument. The William G. Morgan House (site of Morgan Acres and Morgan's first crude shelter) is 2.4 miles (4 km) west of the monument. Cool Spring Farm, the home of Morgan's son Zackquill Morgan and the site of Morgan Cabin, is located 2.7 miles (4 km) to the west of the monument.

== History ==
=== Morgan Morgan's settlement and significance ===
The monument memorializes Morgan Morgan (1688–1766), an American pioneer of Welsh descent who was among the earliest Europeans to settle permanently within the boundaries of the present-day U.S. state of West Virginia.

The Mill Creek watershed and the land upon which the Morgan Morgan Monument is located were originally part of the Northern Neck Proprietary, a land grant that the exiled Charles II, King of England, awarded to seven of his supporters in 1649 during the English Interregnum. Following the Restoration in 1660, Charles II finally ascended to the English throne. Charles II renewed the Northern Neck Proprietary grant in 1662, revised it in 1669, and again renewed the original grant favoring original grantee Thomas Colepeper, 2nd Baron Colepeper, and Henry Bennet, 1st Earl of Arlington, in 1672. In 1681 Bennet sold his share to Lord Colepeper, who received a new charter for the entire land grant from James II, King of England, in 1688. Following the deaths of Lord Colepeper, his wife Margaret, and his daughter Katherine, the Northern Neck Proprietary passed to Katherine's son Thomas Fairfax, 6th Lord Fairfax of Cameron, in 1719.

Morgan Morgan arrived in the Bunker Hill area circa 1731 when it was still a part of Spotsylvania County, and he was given a 1,000-acre (405 ha) land grant of the Northern Neck Proprietary's land on December 12, 1735. Morgan was believed to have been the first European to permanently settle in present-day West Virginia; however, German settlers may have inhabited Shepherdstown as early as 1727. Morgan became active in local governance, and was appointed a justice of the peace for Spotsylvania County by the Virginia Governor's Council on April 23, 1734. Orange County was created from Spotsylvania in late 1734, and Morgan continued on as a justice of the peace for the new county. In January 1735 when the Orange County Court first convened, Morgan served on its new commission of the peace. Morgan also served as captain of the Orange County militia. He worked to develop the region's road network and infrastructure, and is credited with developing and overseeing the construction of a route between Bunker Hill and Winchester. Morgan also operated an ordinary on his property.

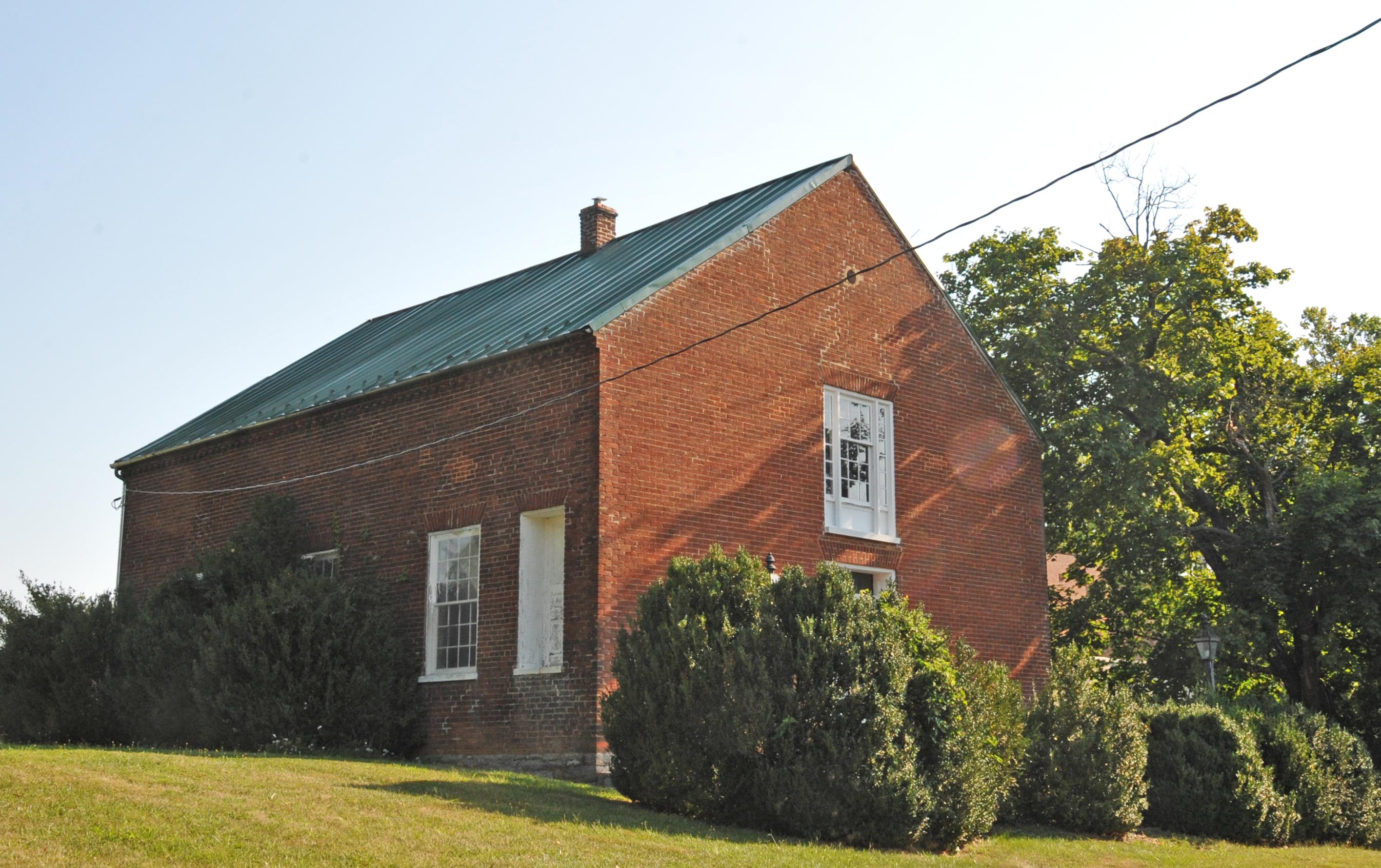
Morgan Chapel and Graveyard

Morgan was instrumental in helping to create Frederick County from Orange County in 1738. Morgan served as a justice of the peace on the Frederick County Court's commission of the peace when it was convened in 1743. Morgan also served as a vestryman of the Frederick Parish of the Anglican Church. Around 1740 he established present-day West Virginia's first Anglican Communion church along with settlers John Briscoe and Jacob Hite. The church was originally built as a log structure known as Morgan's Chapel, and after its reconstruction in 1851, it became known as Christ Episcopal Church. Morgan Morgan and his family are interred in the church's adjoining cemetery. After Morgan's death, Berkeley County was created in 1772 from the northern third of Frederick County.

Morgan's original log cabin was constructed between 1731 and 1734. This structure was rebuilt and restored with many of its original logs in 1976 as a West Virginia and Berkeley County Bicentennial Project. Wood siding was added to the cabin's exterior in 1994 to protect the original logs. Known as the Morgan Cabin, it is located on the Cool Spring Farm property 2.74 miles (4 km) west of the monument and Bunker Hill. Morgan Cabin, Cool Spring Farm, and the surrounding 104 acres (42 ha) are owned by the Berkeley County Historical Landmarks Association and managed by a special committee of the association.

=== Monument establishment ===
During its 1923 legislative session, the West Virginia Legislature passed a bill (introduced by West Virginia State Senator Harry P. Henshaw of Bunker Hill) appropriating $5,000 toward a monument memorializing Morgan Morgan in Bunker Hill. The bill was approved by West Virginia Governor Ephraim F. Morgan, a direct descendant of Morgan. The bill stated that Morgan Morgan was "a man of high character who, by his efforts and example, was largely useful in the community of which he was the founder". It also proclaimed that the monument to Morgan would "commemorate his life and deeds". Half of the bill's appropriation was disbursed in 1924, and the other half was disbursed later in 1925. The monument was to be located at or near Morgan's burial site at Morgan Chapel. The bill stipulated that the monument would be planned and supervised by the Morgan Morgan Monument Commission, which was to consist of three members appointed by the Governor, who was to oversee the commission. On the morning of January 2, 1924, Governor Morgan appointed the committee, which consisted of Haze Morgan, another direct descendant of Morgan and the commission's chairperson; Blanche M. Pickering (Mrs. A. A. Pickering) of Rowlesburg; and West Virginia State Senator Harry P. Henshaw of Bunker Hill. The commission purchased a 1.05-acre (0.4 ha) lot for $420 for the construction of the monument in Bunker Hill.

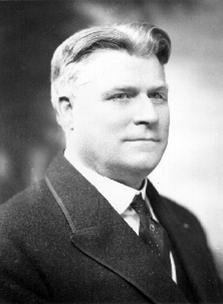
West Virginia Governor Ephraim F. Morgan

The granite Morgan Morgan Monument was erected in 1924. It was unveiled and dedicated during a ceremony held on September 13, 1924, and arranged by the Colonel Morgan Morgan Chapter of the Daughters of the American Revolution (DAR) of Clarksburg, two local DAR chapters, and several Virginia DAR chapters. Governor Morgan, who appointed and oversaw the monument's commission, was the principal speaker at the ceremony and delivered its chief address. Governor Morgan also accepted the monument on behalf of the state of West Virginia. Charles James Faulkner, former United States Senator from West Virginia, gave a speech about Morgan and the early history of Berkeley County. The local students of Bunker Hill formed a chorus to perform at the ceremony. The actual unveiling of the monument was performed by Morgan descendant Anna Mildred Morgan of the Colonel Morgan Morgan Chapter of the DAR. A benediction was given by Morgan Chapel rector Rev. J. L. Oldham. The Colonel Morgan Morgan Chapter of the DAR planted a tree near the monument at the conclusion of the dedication program. In addition to the Colonel Morgan Morgan Chapter of the DAR, organizers of the dedication ceremony included Morgan Morgan Monument Commission chairman Haze Morgan and members Blanche M. Pickering and Harry P. Henshaw. Several hundred attendees were present at the dedication ceremony, mostly from the immediate area, Clarksburg, Fairmont, and nearby communities in Virginia. Also held in connection with the dedication was a family reunion of Morgan Morgan's descendants.

Later in 1924, the West Virginia Monuments Commission transferred the monument site to the West Virginia Road Commission because the Monuments Commission felt the Road Commission was better suited to maintain the monument due to its equipment. Following its transfer to the Road Commission, the park added a tourist camp and became the first free public tourist attraction in the state of West Virginia.

The roadside park was occasionally utilized by local organizations for the hosting of events, including by the Rest Church of nearby Rest, Virginia.

=== Park development and maintenance ===
In 1925 the Legislature established the State Forest, Park and Conservation Commission to study and investigate the opportunities and needs for forests, parks, game preserves, and recreational areas in West Virginia. In 1927 the Commission provided its recommendations to the Legislature, which included a recommendation for a State Monument System. In its list of extant historical monuments to be included in this system, the Commission named the Grave Creek Mound in Moundsville, the Point Pleasant Monument (now Tu-Endie-Wei) in Point Pleasant, the James Rumsey Monument in nearby Shepherdstown, the Cadell Rifle Range in Preston County, and the Morgan Morgan Monument.

In 1956 the Morgan Morgan Monument and Roadside Park was transferred to the ownership of the West Virginia Conservation Commission's Division of State Parks, thus making it a part of the West Virginia state parks system. It was the only state park ever to have been operated in Berkeley County. The monument and its adjoining park were under the jurisdiction of Cacapon Resort State Park in nearby Omps. Its maintenance was the responsibility of Cacapon Resort State Park's supervisor James Ambrose and his subordinate personnel. In 1960 the Morgan Morgan Monument was listed in a National Park Service (NPS) tabulation of U.S. state parks and was categorized as a "state monument" under the governance of the West Virginia Conservation Commission's Division of State Parks. The NPS noted that the small park lacked water recreation, overnight accommodations, and eating accommodations.

In 1962 the monument was included as a stop on the Annual House and Garden Tour of Shepherdstown, Martinsburg, Charles Town, and Harpers Ferry, which was sponsored by the Shenandoah–Potomac Garden Council. Between July 1, 1963, and June 30, 1964, the West Virginia Conservation Commission's Division of State Parks recorded the attendance of 1,500 visitors to the Morgan Morgan Monument, the lowest figure in the state park system. A 1964 NPS survey of West Virginia state park facilities noted that the Morgan Morgan Monument was a "day and weekend use" park whose only significant feature was its historical relevance. In 1966 the West Virginia Historic Commission erected two West Virginia highway markers within the park to the immediate south of the monument: one with a brief biography of Morgan and the other detailing nearby Morgan Acres. In early 1970 the ownership and operation of the monument and park were transferred to the West Virginia State Road Commission, which later became known as the West Virginia Division of Highways under the West Virginia Department of Transportation. The Morgan Morgan Monument became a contributing property of the Mill Creek Historic District on the NRHP on December 10, 1980. As of 2016, the park is erroneously listed in the West Virginia Blue Book as Bunker Hill State Park. The Blue Book is an annual guide published by the West Virginia Legislature.

== Monument description ==
The Morgan Morgan Monument consists of a tall granite stone from Barre, Vermont, atop a concrete foundation. The monument measures 12.5 feet (4 m) in total height. A 10-inch (25 cm) medallion of the Seal of West Virginia is affixed to the top of the monument's main (western) façade, over two indented lines within the stone. The following inscription is etched into the stone below the seal: "COL. MORGAN MORGAN NOV. 1, 1688 – NOV. 17, 1766". Below the inscription is a plaque that reads:

ERECTED BY THE STATE OF WEST VIRGINIA

In commemoration of the first settlement within the present boundaries of said State, which was made by Col. Morgan Morgan, a native of Wales, and Catherine Garretson, his wife, in the year 1726 on a tract of 1000 acres about 2 miles west of here.

Granted to him by colonial Virginia patent, and in recognition of the sterling character of the said Morgan and family who by their efforts and example, were largely useful in the community of which he was the founder and had great influence for good upon the early history of the territory now constituting this State. His grave (marked) is nearby, adjacent Christ's Episcopal Church formerly called Morgan's Chapel, the oldest church in this State, which he helped organize and build.

Commissioners:
Ephraim F. Morgan, Governor of W. Va.
Harry P. Henshaw, State Senator;
Mrs. Blanche M. Pickering;
Haze Morgan.

A.D. MCMXXIV.

== See also ==
- List of West Virginia state parks
- Mill Creek Historic District (Bunker Hill, West Virginia)
- National Register of Historic Places listings in Berkeley County, West Virginia

== Bibliography ==
- Brannon, Selden W., ed. (1976). Historic Hampshire: A Symposium of Hampshire County and Its People, Past and Present. Parsons, West Virginia: McClain Printing Company. ISBN 978-0-87012-236-1. OCLC 3121468.
- Chambers, S. Allen (2004). Buildings of West Virginia. Oxford, New York City: Oxford University Press. ISBN 978-0-19-516548-7. OCLC 53315276.
- Coleman, Roy V. (1951). Liberty and Property. New York City: Scribner. OCLC 1020487 – via Internet Archive.
- des Cognets, Louis Jr. (1958). English Duplicates of Lost Virginia Records. Princeton, New Jersey. OCLC 1266767 – via Internet Archive.
- Gioulis, Michael; Wood, Don C. (April 30, 1994). National Register of Historic Places Registration Form: Cool Spring Farm (Rockdale Spring Farm; Torytown) (PDF). United States Department of the Interior, National Park Service. Archived from the original (PDF) on December 20, 2017.
- Hofstra, Warren R. (2005). The Planting of New Virginia: Settlement and Landscape in the Shenandoah Valley. Baltimore: Johns Hopkins University Press. ISBN 978-0-8018-8271-5. OCLC 62225605 – via Google Books.
- Miller, Thomas Condit; Maxwell, Hu (1913). West Virginia and Its People, Volume 1. New York City: Lewis Historical Publishing Company. OCLC 1449151. Archived from the original on June 4, 2016 – via Google Books.
- Munske, Roberta R.; Kerns, Wilmer L., eds. (2004). Hampshire County, West Virginia, 1754–2004. Romney, West Virginia: The Hampshire County 250th Anniversary Committee. ISBN 978-0-9715738-2-6. OCLC 55983178.
- National Park Service (1964). Parks for America: A Survey of Park and Related Resources in Fifty States, and a Preliminary Plan. Washington, D.C.: United States Department of the Interior National Park Service. OCLC 475840999 – via Internet Archive.
- National Park Service (1960). State Parks: Areas, Acreages and Accommodations. Washington, D.C.: United States Department of the Interior National Park Service. OCLC 5217001 – via Internet Archive.
- Rice, Otis K. (2015). The Allegheny Frontier: West Virginia Beginnings, 1730–1830. Lexington, Kentucky: University Press of Kentucky. ISBN 978-0-8131-6438-0. OCLC 900345296. Archived from the original on May 27, 2016 – via Google Books.
- Rose, Cornelia Bruère (1976). Arlington County, Virginia: A History. Arlington County, Virginia: Arlington Historical Society. OCLC 2401541. Archived from the original on April 2, 2016 – via Google Books.
- Ruth, Frances D. (September 30, 1983a). National Register of Historic Places Registration Form: Morgan Chapel and Graveyard (Christ Episcopal Church–Bunker Hill) (PDF). United States Department of the Interior, National Park Service. Archived from the original (PDF) on December 20, 2017.
- Ruth, Frances D. (September 30, 1984). National Register of Historic Places Registration Form: Morgan-Gold House (Golden Meadows) (PDF). United States Department of the Interior, National Park Service. Archived from the original (PDF) on December 20, 2017.
- Ruth, Frances D. (September 30, 1983b). National Register of Historic Places Registration Form: William G. Morgan House (Morgan Acres) (PDF). United States Department of the Interior, National Park Service. Archived from the original (PDF) on December 20, 2017.
- Scott, William Wallace (2007). A History of Orange County, Virginia: From its Formation in 1734 (O.S.) to the end of Reconstruction in 1870; compiled mainly from Original Records. Baltimore: Genealogical Publishing Company. ISBN 9780806305950. OCLC 317622948.
- West Virginia Legislature (2016). "Section Nine: Counties". In Clark S. Barnes, Clerk of the West Virginia Senate (ed.). West Virginia Blue Book (PDF). Charleston, West Virginia: Chapman Printing. pp. 877–945. ISSN 0364-7323. OCLC 1251675. Archived from the original (PDF) on December 26, 2017.
- West Virginia State Park History Committee (1988). Where People and Nature Meet: A History of the West Virginia State Parks. Charleston, West Virginia: Pictorial Histories Publishing Company. ISBN 978-0-933126-91-6. OCLC 22116273.
- William and Mary Quarterly (April 1898). "The Northern Neck of Virginia". William and Mary Quarterly. 6 (4). Williamsburg, Virginia: College of William & Mary: 222–6. doi:10.2307/1915885. ISSN 0043-5597. JSTOR 1915885. OCLC 1607858.
- Wood, Don C. (1980). National Register of Historic Places Registration Form: Mill Creek Historic District (PDF). United States Department of the Interior, National Park Service. Archived from the original (PDF) on December 1, 2017.
