= Cool Spring Farm =

Cool Spring Farm may refer to:

- Cool Spring Farm (Charles Town, West Virginia), listed on the National Register of Historic Places (NRHP) in Jefferson County
- Cool Spring Farm (Gerrardstown, West Virginia), NRHP-listed in Berkeley County, was believed to be first European settlement, by Morgan Morgan, in what became the state of West Virginia
