= Morgan-Gold House =

Historic house in West Virginia, United States

- U.S. National Register of Historic Places
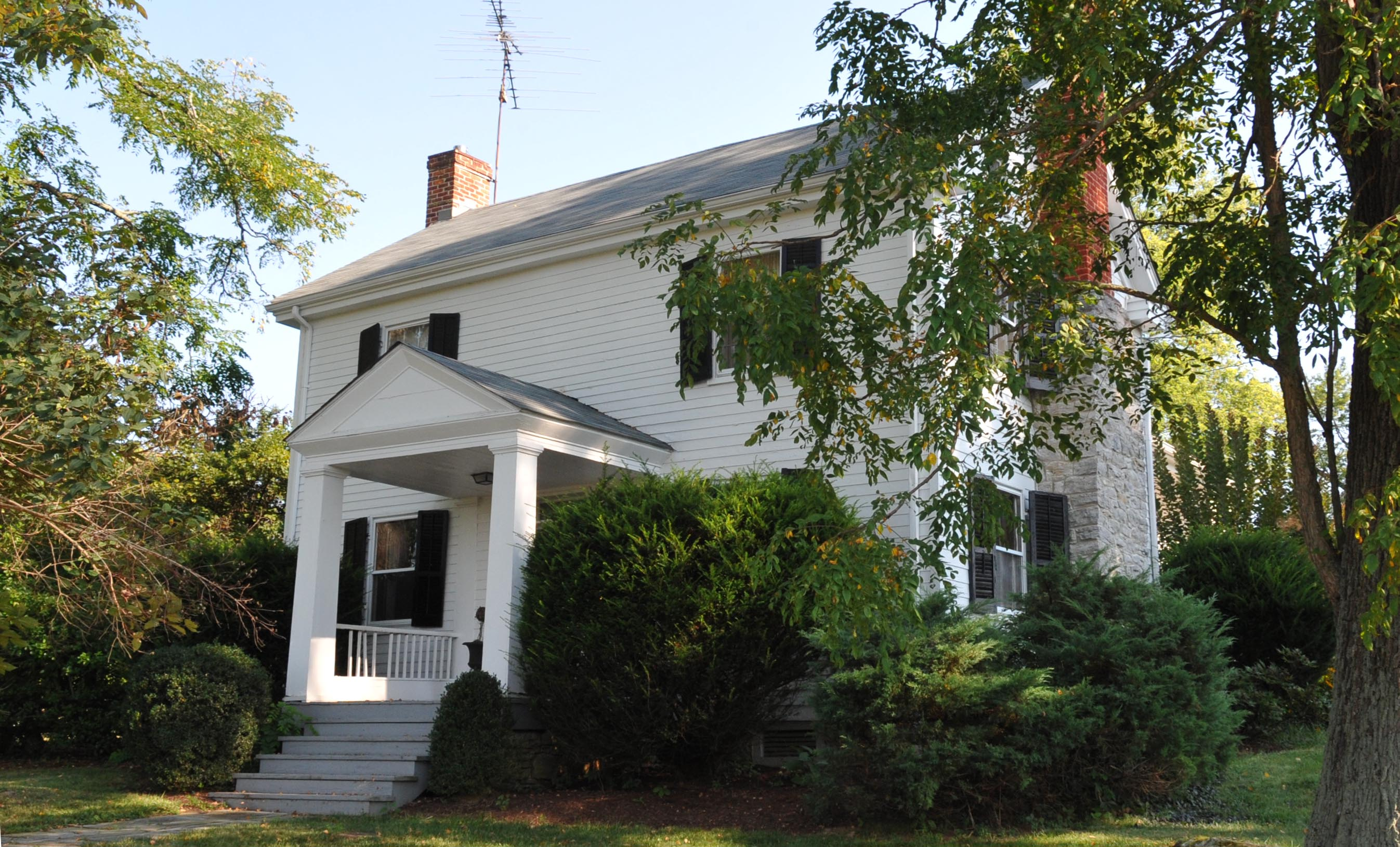

- Location within West Virginia Location within the United States
- Location: WV 26, Bunker Hill, West Virginia
- Coordinates: 39°19′56″N 78°4′40″W
- Area: 4 acres (1.6 ha)
- Built: 1745
- Architect: David Morgan
- Architectural style: Greek Revival
- NRHP reference No.: 85001519
- Added to NRHP: July 8, 1985

Morgan-Gold House, also known as "Golden Meadows" or the Samuel Gold House, is a historic home located at Bunker Hill, Berkeley County, West Virginia. It is an L-shaped, three-bay, two-story, log dwelling on a stone foundation. The front section was built about 1809, and is a 20 1/2-feet deep and 30 1/2-feet wide block, with a pedimented portico in the Greek Revival style. The rear part of the ell was built about 1745 by David Morgan, son of the Morgan Morgan the first white settler of West Virginia. Also on the property are three log outbuildings and Victorian-era granary.

It was listed on the National Register of Historic Places in 1985.

== See also ==
- William G. Morgan House
