= Hays-Gerrard House =

Historic house in West Virginia, United States

- U.S. National Register of Historic Places
- U.S. Historic district – Contributing property
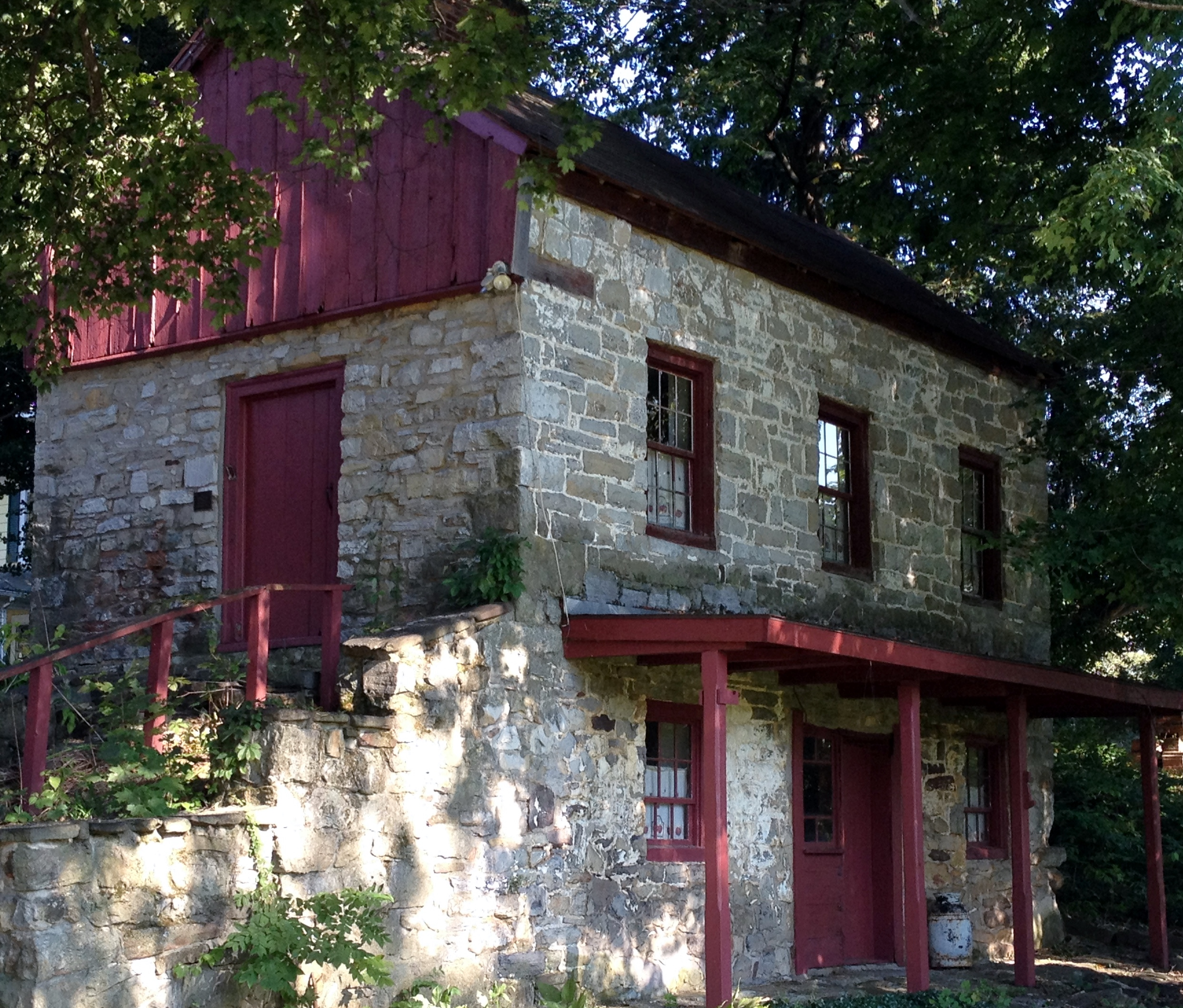

- Location within West Virginia Location within the United States
- Location: Congress St., Gerrardstown, West Virginia
- Coordinates: 39°22′10″N 78°5′50″W
- Area: 1 acre (0.40 ha)
- Built: 1743
- Architect: Hays, John, Sr.
- NRHP reference No.: 85002409
- Added to NRHP: September 16, 1985

Hays-Gerrard House is a historic home located at Gerrardstown, Berkeley County, West Virginia. It was built about 1743 and is a two-story, three bay wide limestone dwelling. It measures 16 feet by 27 feet and has a steeply pitched gable roof. The property was the site of the first Baptist church in the area and home to Rev. John Gerrard, first Baptist minister west of the Blue Ridge Mountains. The house was restored in the 1970s.

It was listed on the National Register of Historic Places in 1985. It is located within the Gerrardstown Historic District, listed in 1991.
