= John Drinker House =

Historic house in West Virginia, United States

- U.S. National Register of Historic Places
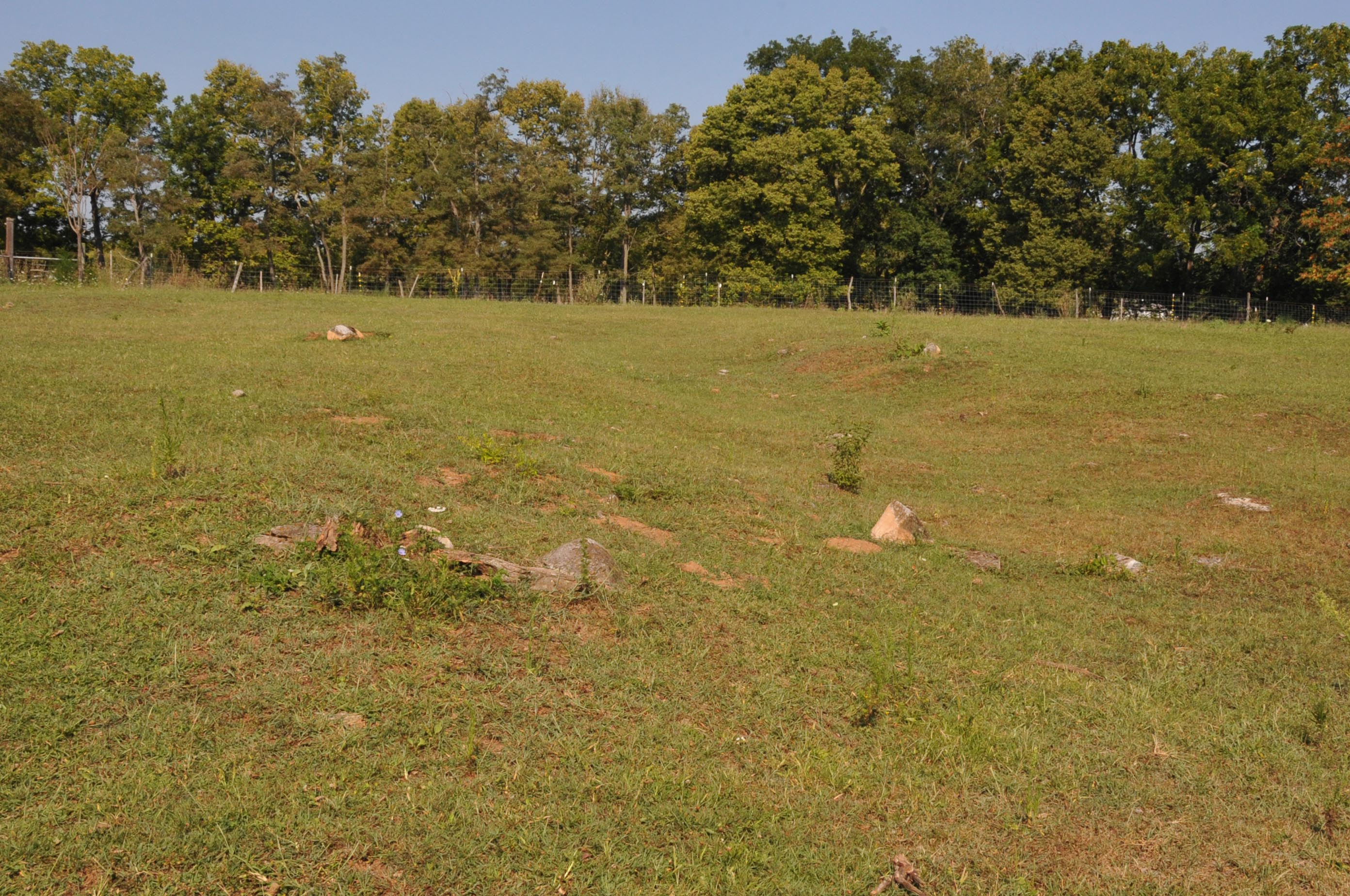
- Depression in the ground where the Drinker House once stood

- Location within West Virginia Location within the United States
- Location: Sam Mason Rd., Bunker Hill, West Virginia
- Coordinates: 39°19′6″N 78°4′48″W
- Area: 2 acres (0.81 ha)
- Built: 1815
- Architectural style: Federal
- MPS: Berkeley County MRA
- NRHP reference No.: 80004409
- Added to NRHP: December 10, 1980

John Drinker House is a historic home located at Bunker Hill, Berkeley County, West Virginia. It was built about 1815 and is a two-story, five-bay, limestone dwelling in the Federal style. It features an arched stone main entrance. The property includes the ruins of a log home that pre-dates the Drinker House, ruins of a stone smokehouse, and the ruins of slave quarters. A dump pile is also located on the property. The house was built by John Drinker (1760–1826), a Quaker portrait artist from Philadelphia. The house is believed to have been a stop on the Underground Railroad.

It was listed on the National Register of Historic Places in 1980.
