= David Morgan (frontiersman) =

Early western Virginian frontiersman, pioneer, mountaineer, and soldier

- Born: 1721; Province of New Jersey, British America
- Died: 1813 (aged 91–92); Virginia, U.S.
- Known for: Frontiersman and Indian fighter

David Morgan (12 May 1721 – 19 May 1813), sometimes known as "The Great Indian Fighter", was a soldier, mountaineer, pioneer, and frontiersman in what is now the state of West Virginia.

== Early life ==
He was born in Christiana, New Castle, Delaware, the third child of Morgan Morgan and Catherine Garretson Morgan, traditionally stated to be the first white settler in what is now West Virginia. Family tradition claims he was a friend of George Washington and Patrick Henry. Morgan was hired to help Washington survey Lord Fairfax's Virginia land holdings in 1746 and establish the northern border of the Fairfax estate. This boundary became the border between Maryland and Pennsylvania. A monument placed at the source of the North Branch of the Potomac River is known as the Fairfax Stone. Afterwards, Washington hired Morgan to survey his land on the Ohio River. The Morgan Family Bible states that he killed seven Indians in self-defense.

== Frontiersman ==
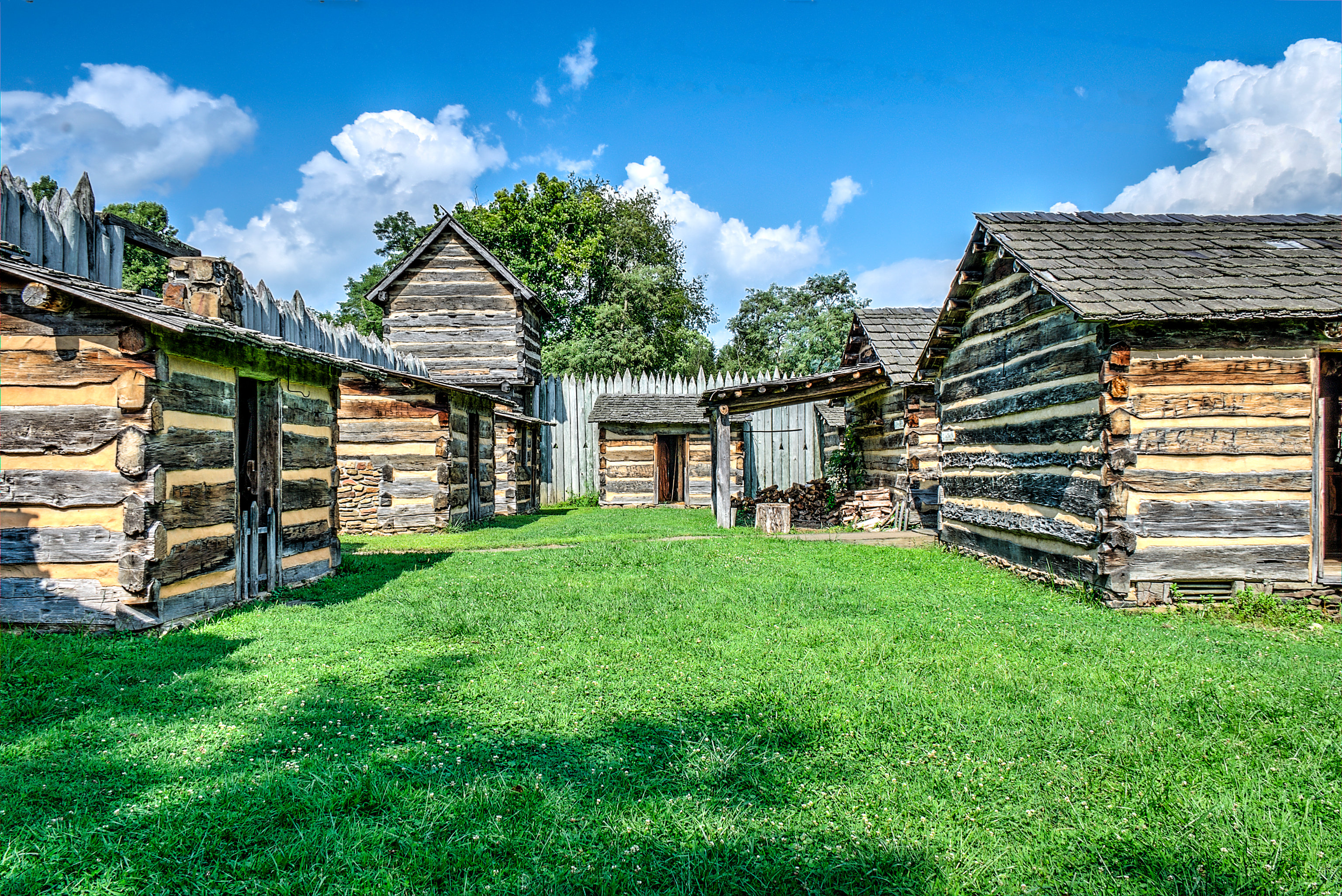
Prickett's Fort

The most famous Indian fight he was in occurred in 1778 when he was bedridden in Prickett's Fort, he had a dream that his children were running around scalped. He grabbed his gun, ran outside, and found his children chasing a cow near two Indians on his land in present-day Rivesville, West Virginia. David sent them back to the fort, and as this happened, he shot and killed one Indian. Then, a second one threw a tomahawk at the back of his head as he ran back towards the fort, but David deflected it with his hand losing two fingers. He turned around to the Indian, fought hand to hand with him, and finally stabbed the Indian with the Indian's own knife. After a while, they tracked down the injured Indian and found him bounding his stomach wound which had corn seeping from it. The Indian told David “how do broder, how do broder,” trying to talk English peacefully to David and the other settlers. However the Indian died of his wounds. Another account tells that he killed another Indian and the settlers in Prickett's Fort made the Indian's skin into a shot pouch, and presented it to David as a souvenir.

Morgan participated in many battles of the French and Indian War and the Revolutionary War. He and a younger brother Zackquill (Zackwell) Morgan first settled Morgantown, West Virginia in 1767, which is the town where West Virginia University is located. David and his brother Zackquill first came through the Morgantown area in 1767 and resided at what would be future Downtown Morgantown for a few years. (It wasn't until 1785 when Morgantown became an official city and Fort Morgan wasn't built until 1772) David lived here for two years before moving to Red Stone Creek in Pennsylvania. He then returned to live at Morgantown in 1772 and built the Fort Morgan stockade before he finally moved to area of Fairmont, West Virginia.

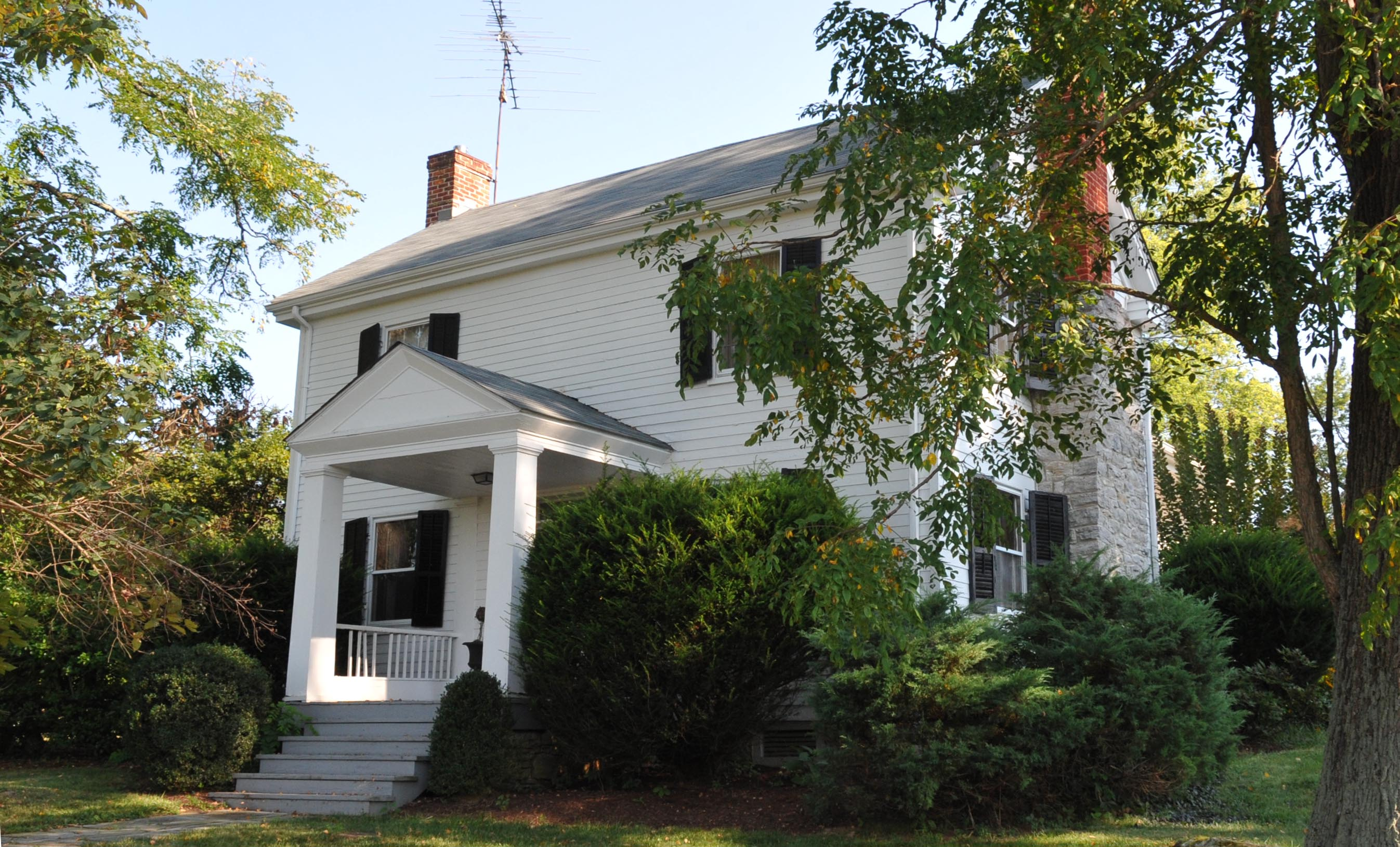
Morgan-Gold House, Berkeley County, WV

In 1745, Morgan built a log cabin at Bunker Hill, Frederick (now Berkeley) County, (West) Virginia. (This structure was later expanded and became the Morgan-Gold House; it was listed on the National Register of Historic Places in 1985.) In 1772, he moved to Marion County, (West) Virginia. David also built and lived in the original Prickett's Fort State Park helping protect the bastion from Indians and British soldiers alongside Jacob Prickett. During his time in Fairmont, West Virginia he founded and established the community of Pettyjohn on the West side of Fairmont. The community had its own ferry, salt works, mail drop, and trading post, all thanks to David. Even though he may not have a large rank or as remembered as his brother Zackquill, he was still courageous, smart, and proud to fight for his family and his country.

Morgan is the 3rd great grandfather of West Virginia Governor Ephraim F. Morgan (1869–1950) and Congressman William S. Morgan (1801–1878).

== Military service ==
=== French and Indian War ===
During the French and Indian War, David fought under the command of Captain Charles Lewis with the 1st Virginia Regiment. He was also a defender at Fort Necessity and served under General Edward Braddock in the disastrous march on Fort Duquesne, present-day Pittsburgh. It was at Fort Duquesne that he received his famous Sabre scar on his left cheek from fighting the French. David also was a part of the Forbes Expedition that successfully captured Fort Duquesne. Other battles he fought in include the Battle of Jumonville Glen, Battle of the Wilderness, Battle of Great Cacapon, possibly the Sandy Creek Expedition, and several other important battles of the war. Then David, along with many other acquaintances, also helped to track and fight Indians and French soldiers. They tracked them from Buffalo Creek, to the West Fork River, to Cheat River, to the Allegheny Mountains, and Deckers Creek until they skirmished against the Indians and French, lost their trail, and finally had to camp along Deckers Creek.

=== American Revolution ===
David served in a militia company under his brother Zackquill, then served as a private under the command of Captain William Haymond's Co., Virginia Militia; he had previously fought with the 10th Virginia Regiment for a few months; and even earlier as Captain of 5th Co., 8th Lancaster Battalion under Col. Peter Grubb. He and the Morgan clan vowed themselves to George Washington and the American cause, and David was there willing to fight blue-coated in volley lines and frontier style. (Might have been because of his ancestral Welsh) He served in the American Revolution from about 1775 to the end of the war. He fought in numerous battles including Saratoga, Siege of Fort Laurens, Cowpens, skirmishes against loyalists in the Ohio Country and Native Americans at Prickett's Fort, and, according to Glenn Lough's Now and Long Ago, western campaigns such as the Brodhead Expedition. other engagements of the war. His final rank leaving service was Captain.

== Family ==
David married Sarah Stevens in 1745. Together they had the following 8 children:

1. Morgan 'Mod' Morgan born 20 Dec 1746 died 31 Oct 1826
2. James Morgan born 5 Apr 1748 died 3 Mar 1840
3. Evan Thomas Morgan born 3 Mar 1753 died 18 Mar 1850
4. Mary Elizabeth Morgan born 1755 died 1798
5. Zackquill Morgan born 8 Sep 1758 died 27 Feb 1834 (not to be confused with Colonel Zackquill Morgan founder of Morgantown, West Virginia)
6. Stephen Morgan born 17 Oct 1761 died 30 Nov 1850
7. Sarah Morgan born 1765 died 1791
8. Catherine Morgan born 16 Jan 1769 died 30 Apr 1848.
