= Mill Creek Historic District (Bunker Hill, West Virginia) =

Historic district in West Virginia, United States

- U.S. National Register of Historic Places
- U.S. Historic district
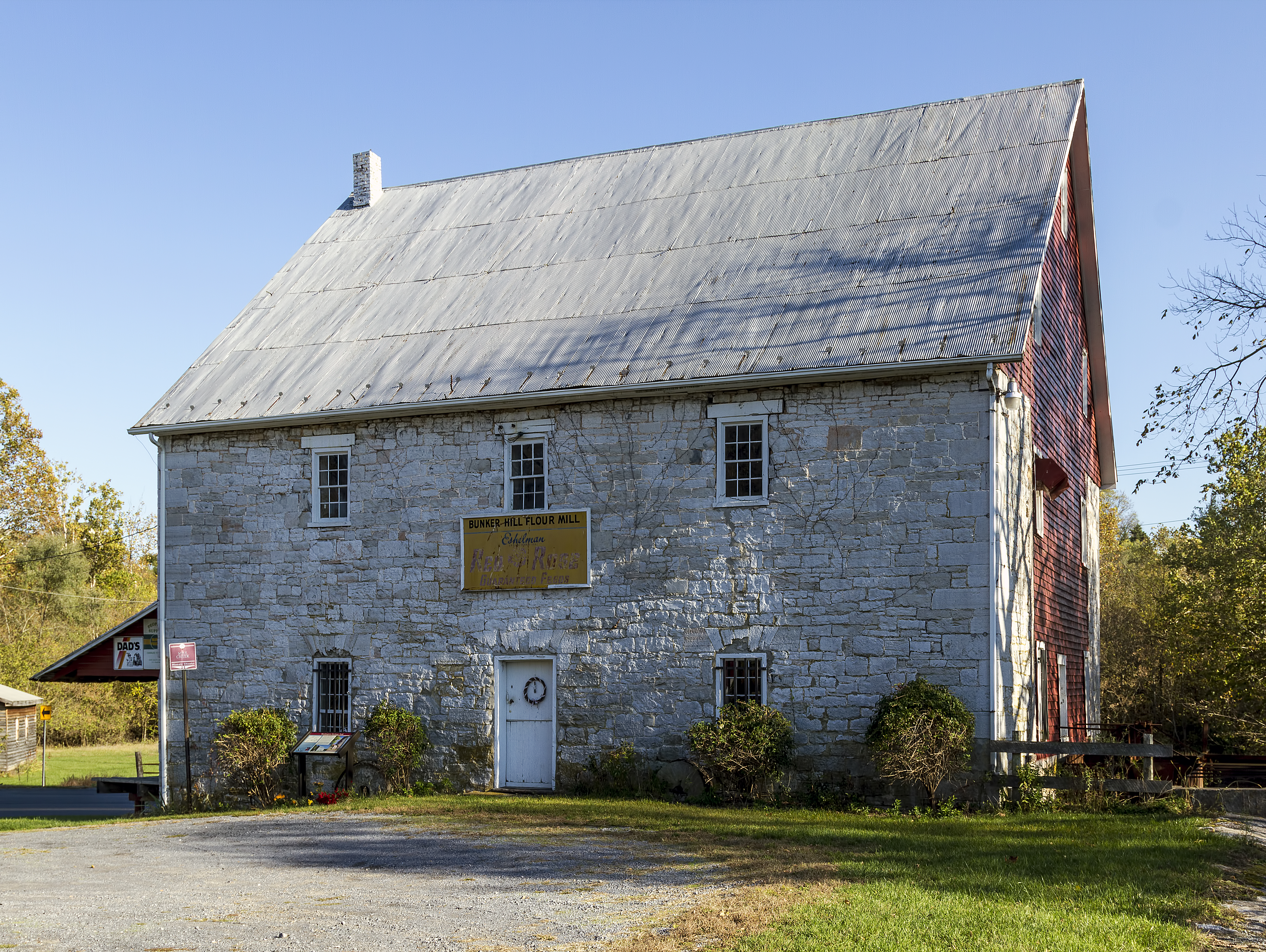
- Bunker Hill Mill

- Location within West Virginia Location within the United States
- Location: Runs along Mill Creek extending both east and west of Bunker Hill, Bunker Hill, West Virginia
- Coordinates: 39°20′45″N 78°3′41″W
- Area: 100 acres (40 ha)
- Architect: Multiple
- Architectural style: Greek Revival
- MPS: Berkeley County MRA
- NRHP reference No.: 80004420
- Added to NRHP: December 10, 1980

Mill Creek Historic District is a national historic district located at Bunker Hill, Berkeley County, West Virginia. It encompasses nine contributing buildings, eight contributing sites, and three contributing objects that relate to an early industrial-commercial center in the county. They include: the Mill Creek Bridge (c. 1914), Henry Sherrard Mill (c. 1790), Robert Daniels House (c. 1790), John Gray House, Henshaw Log House (c. 1820), "Springhill" (late 18th century), Henshaw Miller's House (c. 1780), "Springfield" (c. 1775), Holliday Mill Sites, Bunker Hill Cumberland Valley Railroad Bridge, Stephenson's Tavern, Morgan Park including two State markers and monument (1924) to Morgan Morgan, Elisha Boyd Mill Sites, Joel Ward Mill ruins, Bunker Hill Mill Complex, and Joel Ward House (c. 1750, burned 1988).

It was listed on the National Register of Historic Places in 1980.
