= Pettyjohn =

Pettyjohn may refer to:

== People ==
- Adam Pettyjohn (born 1977), American baseball player
- Angelique Pettyjohn (1943–1992), American actress and burlesque queen
- Barry Pettyjohn (born 1964), American football player
- Brian Pettyjohn (born 1974), American politician
- Fritz Pettyjohn (born 1945), American politician
- Jade Pettyjohn (born 2000), American actress

== Places ==
- Crawford–Pettyjohn House, named in part after Frank Pettyjohn, a NRHP listed house in Pierre, South Dakota
- Pettyjohn, Marion County, West Virginia, an unincorporated community in Marion County
- Pettyjohn — a stopping place for wagon trails in Cold Fork, California
- Pettyjohn Cave, in Walker County, Georgia
