= Gerrardstown Historic District =

Historic district in West Virginia, United States

- U.S. National Register of Historic Places
- U.S. Historic district
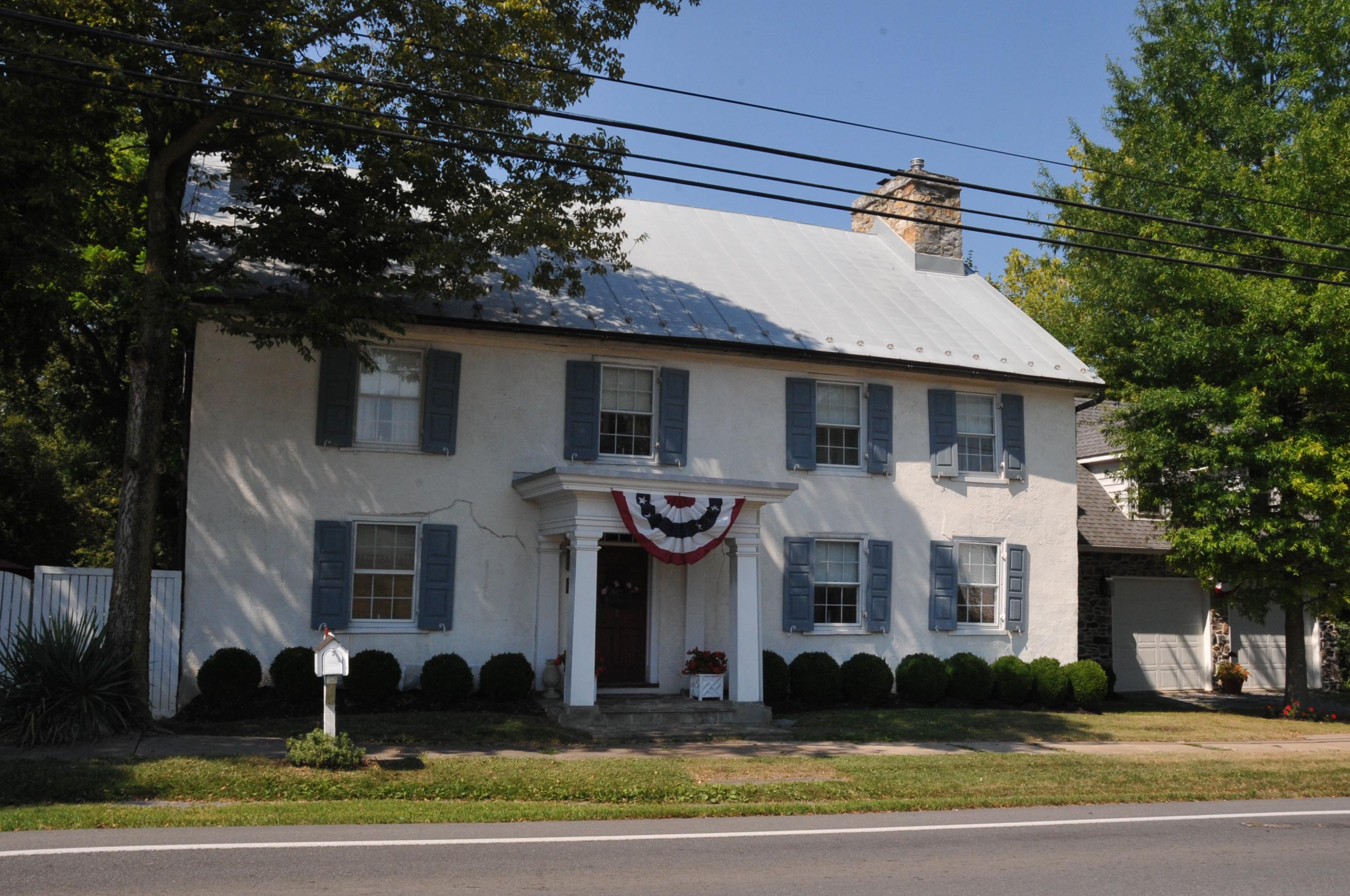
- MALIN-WILSON-GRAY HOUSE; C1795 GREEK REVIVAL

- Location within West Virginia Location within the United States
- Location: Roughly, along WV 51 and Virginia Line Rd., Gerrardstown, West Virginia
- Coordinates: 39°22′7″N 78°5′51″W
- Area: 102 acres (41 ha)
- Architectural style: Greek Revival, Queen Anne, Federal
- NRHP reference No.: 91001008
- Added to NRHP: August 5, 1991

Gerrardstown Historic District is a national historic district located at Gerrardstown, Berkeley County, West Virginia. It encompasses 92 contributing buildings, 4 contributing sites, and 2 contributing structures. Notable commercial buildings include the Gerrardstown Corner Store (c. 1900), Wiest Antiques Store (c. 1900), Richard McCormick Store, Charles Crim Store, and David S. Griffith General Store. Most houses are 2 1/2 stories and are representative of a number of popular architectural styles including Queen Anne, Federal, and Greek Revival. Religious properties include the Presbyterian Church (1893) and Cemetery and Southern Methodist Episcopal Church (1883). Also included is the Lutheran Cemetery with burials dating to 1818. Located within the district is the separately listed Hays-Gerrard House.

It was listed on the National Register of Historic Places in 1991.
