= John Drinker =

American artist (1760–1826)

John Drinker (March 12, 1760 – February 16, 1826) was an American portrait artist.

== Biography ==
Drinker was born on March 12, 1760, in Philadelphia, Pennsylvania. His parents were John Drinker (1716–1787) and Susanna Allen Drinker (1721–1787). His father made a number of successful real estate investments in Philadelphia, including the property known as Drinker's Court. In 1787, John Drinker, Jr., opened a drawing school at Philadelphia, where he taught "the art of Drawing and Colouring." That same year, both of his parents died and with his inheritance, he was able to buy property in Berkeley County, Virginia (now West Virginia). He bought and sold land in Virginia for the next 36 years.

Drinker might have also moved to Virginia between the years 1790 and 1793. On April 12, 1797, he married Elizabeth Peppers in Berkeley County, Virginia, and returned to Philadelphia. In 1801, they returned to Berkeley County, and on January 1, 1808, John bought additional property in Berkeley County, now known as the John Drinker House. He died at his home in Berkeley County on February 16, 1826. He was buried at Morgan Chapel Cemetery. Elizabeth Drinker lived until April 15, 1858.

== Portraiture ==
Of the eight portraits that have been attributed to him, three are signed, but by 1981 only one of these three had been located. All of the portraits are of prominent figures in the Berkeley and Jefferson Counties of Virginia and West Virginia. These works include:

- Sarah deMontargis Rutherford (born c. 1795), Oil on canvas, Signed: A. D. 180[1 or 7]/by Drinker.
- Portrait of Dr. John Briscoe, Jr. (July 2, 1752 – May 12, 1818). Oil on canvas, c. 1801, Attributed to John Drinker.
- Eleanor Magruder Briscoe (January 16, 1766). Oil on canvas, c. 1801, Attributed to John Drinker.
- Warner Lewis Wormeley (March 24, 1785 – 1814). Oil on canvas, c. 1803, Attributed to John Drinker.
- George Steptoe Washington (1771–1809)- Oil on canvas, c. 1798, Attributed to John Drinker
- Lucy Payne Washington (1776–1848). Oil on canvas, c. 1798, Attributed to John Drinker.
- Gabriel Jones (1724–1806) and Margaret Strother Jones (1726–1822). 1792, Signed: Joe Drinker.

== Legacy ==
The John Drinker House was listed on the National Register of Historic Places in 1980.
