= Drinker's Court =

Historic house in Pennsylvania, United States

- U.S. National Register of Historic Places
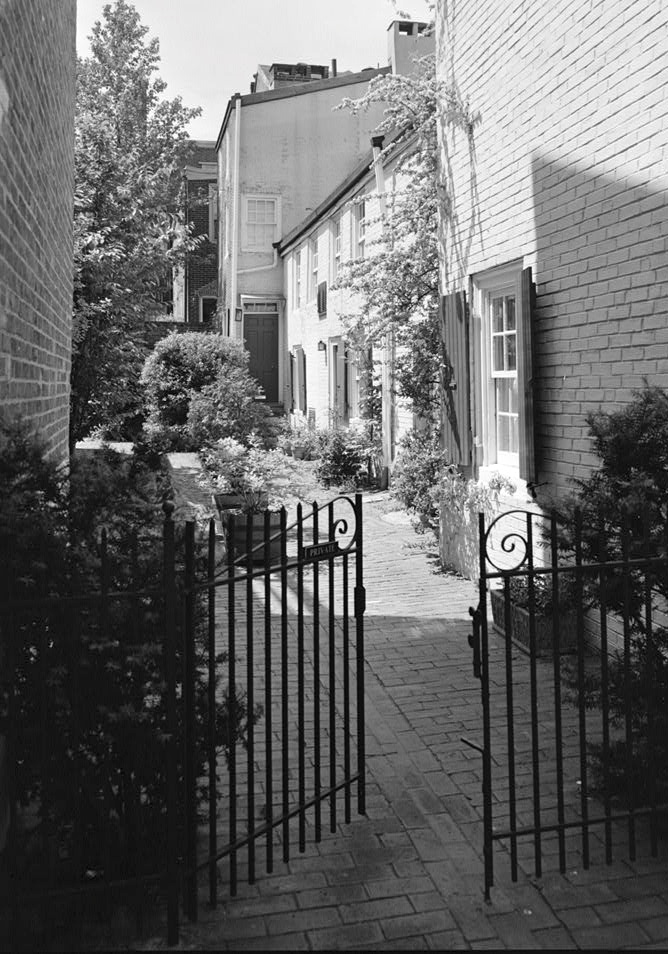
- Drinker's Court in 1972

- Location within Philadelphia Location within Pennsylvania Location within the United States
- Location: 236-238 Delancey Street, Philadelphia, Pennsylvania
- Coordinates: 39°56′36″N 75°8′49″W
- Area: less than one acre
- Built: 1765
- Architect: John Drinker
- Architectural style: Bandbox Court Houses
- NRHP reference No.: 71000723
- Added to NRHP: May 27, 1971

The Drinker's Court, also known as Bandbox Court Houses, is located in the Society Hill section of Philadelphia, Pennsylvania. The houses were built in 1764 by John Drinker (1716–1787), father of noted American portrait artist John Drinker (1760–1826).

They were added to the National Register of Historic Places on May 27, 1971.

== See also ==
- National Register of Historic Places listings in Center City, Philadelphia
