= William G. Morgan House =

Historic house in West Virginia, United States

- U.S. National Register of Historic Places
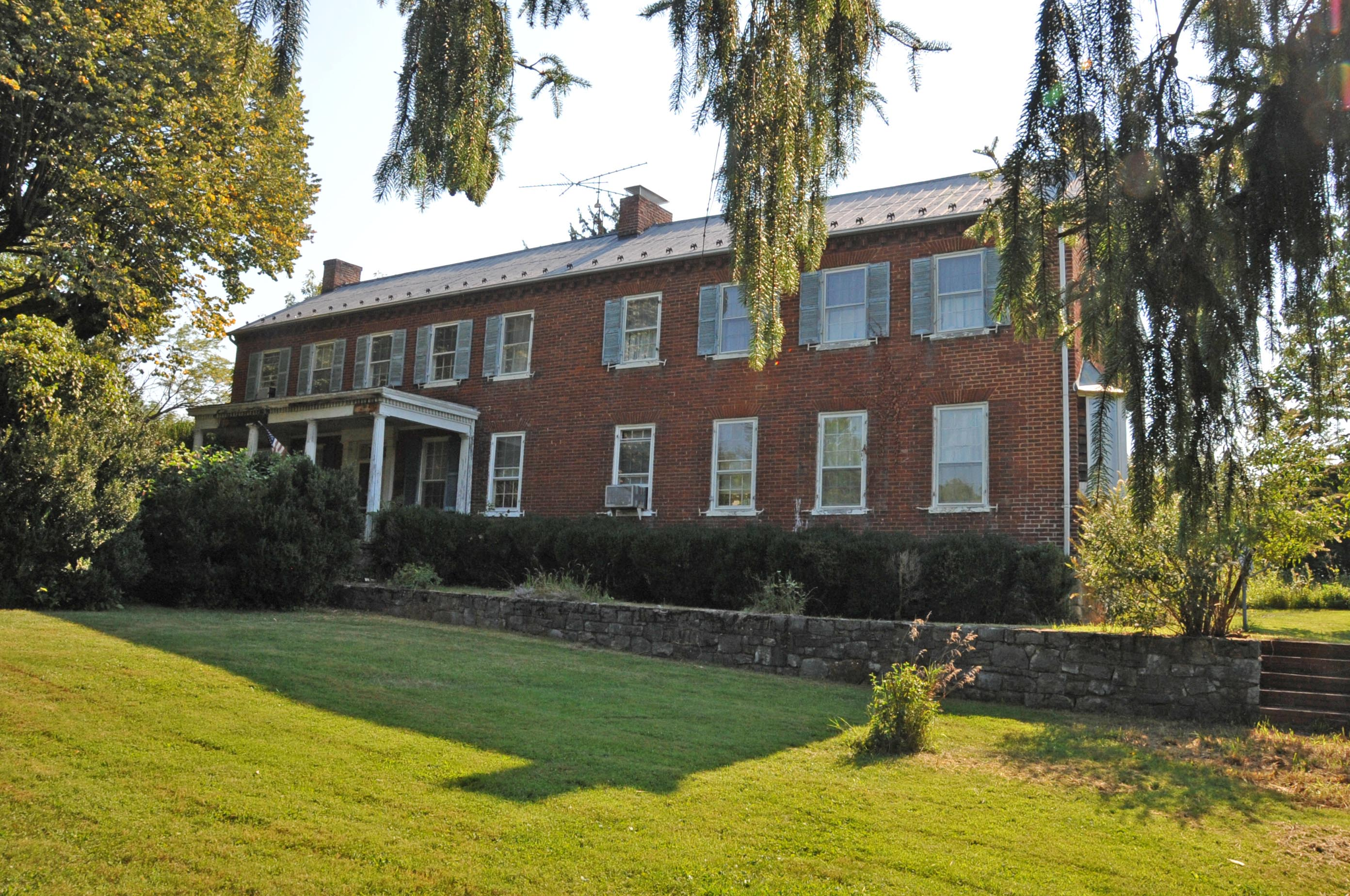
- 2009

- Location within West Virginia Location within the United States
- Location: On Secondary Route 24, south of its junction with Secondary Route 26, Bunker Hill, West Virginia
- Coordinates: 39°19′53″N 78°5′53″W
- Area: 2 acres (0.81 ha)
- Built: 1726, 1849
- Architect: Morgan I. and William G. Morgan
- Architectural style: Greek Revival, Vernacular Greek Revival
- NRHP reference No.: 84003489
- Added to NRHP: January 12, 1984

William G. Morgan House, also known as "Morgan Acres," is a historic home located at Bunker Hill, Berkeley County, West Virginia. It was built in 1849, and is a two-story, nine-bay, brick dwelling in the Greek Revival style. It is a long, narrow building with a central block and side wings, measuring 75 feet long and 21 feet deep. It features a one-story entrance portico with Doric order columns. The entrance has a Chinese Chippendale transom. Also on the property is a brick outbuilding with heavy board-and-batten door. It was built by William G. Morgan, great-grandson of Morgan Morgan, West Virginia's first white settler. The property was determined in 1924 to be the site of Morgan Morgan's first crude shelter built in 1726.

It was listed on the National Register of Historic Places in 1984.

== See also ==
- Morgan-Gold House
