= Gilbert and Samuel McKown House =

Historic house in West Virginia, United States

- U.S. National Register of Historic Places
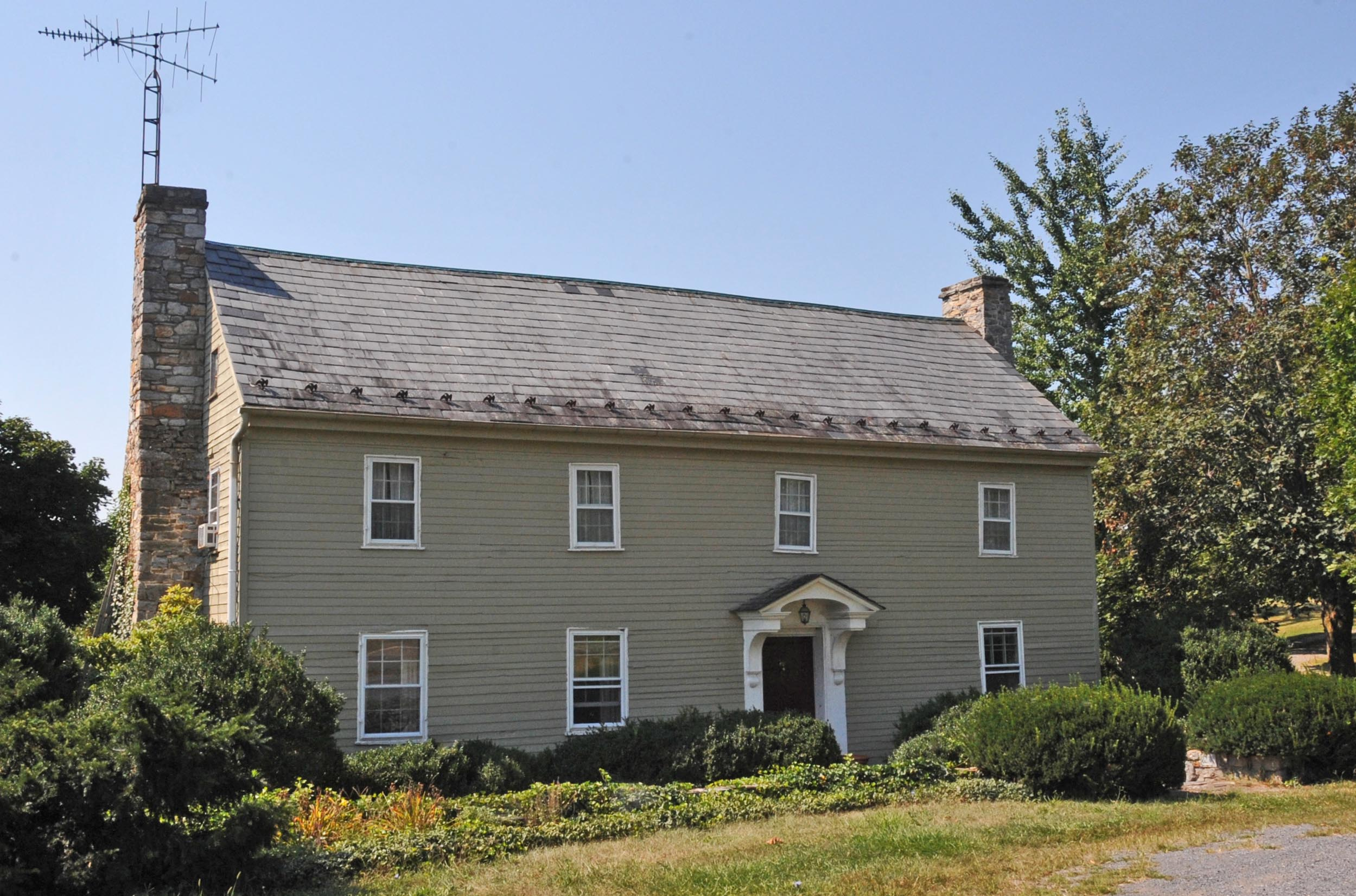

- Location within West Virginia Location within the United States
- Location: WV 51, near Gerrardstown, West Virginia
- Coordinates: 39°22′2″N 78°5′23″W
- Area: 1 acre (0.40 ha)
- Built: 1774, 1810
- Architect: McKown, Gilbert; McKown, Samuel
- NRHP reference No.: 84003477
- Added to NRHP: January 12, 1984

Gilbert and Samuel McKown House, also known as "Marshy Dell", is a historic home located near Gerrardstown, Berkeley County, West Virginia. It is a large two story, four bay wide log dwelling. The eastern section of the house was built by Gilbert McKown about 1774; the other section was added by his son Samuel about 1810. Also on the property is a 1 1/2-story stone outbuilding.

Marshy Dell was listed on the National Register of Historic Places in 1984.
