= Mill Creek (Opequon Creek tributary) =

River in West Virginia, USA

Coordinates: 39°18′41″N 77°59′49″W

Mill Creek is a 14.5-mile-long (23.3 km) tributary of Opequon Creek, belonging to the Potomac River and Chesapeake Bay watersheds, located in Berkeley County in West Virginia's Eastern Panhandle. Its name reflects its past as a popular site for various types of mills, beginning with one constructed by Morgan Morgan in the mid-18th century near his cabin in present-day Bunker Hill.

== Headwaters and course ==
Mill Creek is formed by a series of streams on the eastern flanks of North Mountain along Frog Hollow Road (Virginia Secondary Route 654) in northern Frederick County, Virginia. Mill Creek crosses into Berkeley County, West Virginia, and continues its flow in a northerly direction along the eastern flanks of the mountain, parallel to County Route 51/2. Along its course, Mill Creek is fed by a number of smaller spring-fed streams. Mill Creek then turns to the northeast towards the historic hamlet of Gerrardstown, where it then meanders and heads east along Gerrardstown Road (West Virginia Route 51). The stream passes under County Route 24 and turns to the southeast flowing through hilly terrain where it continues to be fed by smaller unnamed spring-fed streams. After Mill Creek passes under County Route 24/3, its size and flow increase and it then passes under Interstate 81 where it flows through the community of Bunker Hill. East of Bunker Hill, Mill Creek parallels County Route 26 and then meanders southeast through a gorge where it then empties into Opequon Creek south of Tarico Heights on the Berkeley County border with Jefferson County.

== Tributaries ==
Tributary streams are listed from the headwaters to the mouth.

- Torytown Run
- Sylvan Run

== See also ==
- List of Virginia rivers
- List of West Virginia rivers
