= Gerrardstown, West Virginia =

Unincorporated community in West Virginia, United States

Gerrardstown Middletown
- unincorporated community
- Location within the state of West Virginia Gerrardstown (the United States)
- Coordinates: 39°22′13″N 78°05′44″W
- Country: United States
- State: West Virginia
- County: Berkeley
- Established: November 22, 1787
- Founder: John Gerrard
- Elevation: 676 ft (206 m)

Population (2010)
  - Total: 4,024
- Time zone: UTC-5 (Eastern (EST))
  - Summer (DST): UTC-4 (EDT)
- ZIP codes: 25420
- Area codes: 304, 681
- GNIS feature ID: 1554548

Gerrardstown is an unincorporated community village located along W.Va. Route 51 in Berkeley County in West Virginia's Eastern Panhandle region in the lower Shenandoah Valley.

== History ==
Originally established as Middletown on November 22, 1787, by an act of the Virginia General Assembly, Gerrardstown was laid off by David Gerrard on Mill Creek, a tributary of Opequon Creek. Gerrard was the son of Baptist minister John Gerrard (for whom the town was named in 1787, the year of his death). It served as the site of Mill Creek Baptist Church, the first Baptist church west of the Blue Ridge Mountains and member of the Ketocton Association. Gerrardstown was designated as a National Historic District on the National Register of Historic Places in 1991. Many of the village's original buildings from the 18th and 19th centuries remain. According to the 2010 census, the Gerrardstown community has a population of 4,024.

== Sites on the National Register of Historic Places ==
Site	Year built	Address	Listed
Campbellton (Captain James Campbell House)	circa 1780	CR 37	1980
Cool Spring Farm (Zackquill Morgan House)	1761	Runnymede Road (CR 26)	1994
Gerrardstown Historic District	18th–19th centuries	WV 51 and Virginia Line Road	1991
Hays-Gerrard House (Gerrard House)	1743	Congress Street	1985
Marshy Dell (Gilbert and Samuel McKown House)	late 18th century	WV 51	1984
Mountain View Farm (Washington Gold House)	1854	CR 51/2	1984
Oban Hall (Mary Park Wilson House)	1825	CR 51/2	1985
Prospect Hill (William Wilson House)	1795	WV 51	1984

== Continental Brick Protests ==
In May 2008, Continental Brick applied to the Berkeley County Planning Board to open a massive 100 acre quarry, "North Mountain Shale, LLC," in Gerrardstown. The community instantly protested the approval of the building permit, due to the harsh amounts of pollution that would be blown into the air, and the possibility of nearby Mill Creek being polluted. Some residents of Gerrardstown use spigots to deliver water from Mill Creek. Parents in the Gerrardstown and Inwood areas protested because of air pollution that could be harmful to children while on the playgrounds at nearby schools; Gerrardstown Elementary School and Mountain Ridge Intermediate School.

As of 2012, the state of West Virginia had cleared the way for the mining operation.

== Notable person ==
- George M. Bowers, was an American politician who represented West Virginia in the United States House of Representatives.
