= Pettyjohn, Marion County, West Virginia =

- Unincorporated community
- Location within West Virginia Location within the United States
- Coordinates: 39°28′0″N 80°9′14″W
- Country: United States
- State: West Virginia
- County: Marion
- Elevation: 984 ft (300 m)
- Time zone: UTC-5 (Eastern (EST))
  - Summer (DST): UTC-4 (EDT)
- GNIS ID: 1718190

Pettyjohn was an unincorporated community in Marion County, West Virginia, United States. Founded by Captain David Morgan in 1776. The town had its own ferry, salt works, mail drop, trading post, and David built one of his many houses here.
