= Zackquill Morgan =

American pioneer (1735–1795)

Zackquill Morgan (September 8, 1735 – January 1, 1795) was an American military officer and frontiersman best known as the founder of Morgantown, West Virginia. A native of what is now Berkeley County, West Virginia, Morgan was the son of Welsh-born Colonel Morgan Morgan and Catherine Garretson, the first known white settlers in what would become West Virginia. Zackquill served as a colonel in the American Revolutionary War and founded Morgantown in 1785. He died in Morgantown in 1795 and was buried in the cemetery at Prickett's Fort. The grave was "marked by rough native sandstone slab, on which was crudely chiseled the simple lettering, Z. M. Jan. 1, 1795."

Zackquill Morgan's unusual name is spelled many different ways in old Christian records, including Zacuil, Zackwell, Zackquell and Zackil. According to the old Episcopal Church record book at Bunker Hill, West Virginia, Zackquill is the way Morgan Morgan spelled his son's name.

== Biography ==
=== Early life ===
According to family tradition, Zackquill and his brother David served with Virginia forces in the ill-fated Braddock Expedition in 1755 and in the more successful Forbes Expedition in 1758 during the French and Indian War. In 1761, Zackquill received from his father one thousand acres (4 km^{2}) of land in what was then Orange County, Virginia, now part of Berkeley County, West Virginia, which had been patented in November 1735. Most historians believe that David Morgan and his younger brother Zackquill were the first Europeans to attempt a permanent settlement in Monongalia County. About 1765 or 1766, the brothers migrated to Georges Creek, Pennsylvania. They left Delaware and reached present-day Morgantown in 1766 or 1767. A family tradition attributes the settlement of Zackquill Morgan in 1768, but at that time he appears to have still been living in what later became Fayette County. According to a deed on file at Uniontown, Pennsylvania, Zackquill was living at Great Meadows in Bedford [now Fayette] County, Pennsylvania, on August 28, 1771, when he sold his farm there.

Zackquill may have been living near his brother David at Pleasantville until 1779 or 1780. Despite speculation by various historians, it is still unknown when Zackquill Morgan settled on the site of Morgantown, or indeed whether he was even the first to settle there. Regardless of when Morgan moved to the site of the city that bears his name, a surveyor's record indicates that on April 29, 1781, Nicholas Decker, the first settler to establish a settlement in the vicinity of what is now Morgantown, surveyed 220 acres (0.89 km^{2}) of land for Morgan, assignee of Isaac Lemasters, in Monongalia County, on Deckers Creek and the Monongahela River, including his settlement thereon in the year 1772, agreeable to and in part of a certificate for 400 acres (1.6 km^{2}) from the commissioners of adjusting claims to unpatented lands in the county of Monongalia—James Chew assisted Mr. James Madison, surveyor. A courthouse record says: "John Madison assee of Nicholas Decker is intitled to Four Hundred acres of land in Monongalia County on the Monona River to include his settlement made thereon in the year 1766 and prior to any settlement made near the same."

During the Revolutionary War, Morgan was "County Lieutenant" of Monongalia County with the title of colonel. He commanded about 600 men of the Virginia Minutemen during the war and was with General Horatio Gates at the Battle of Saratoga in October 1777. He lost nearly half of his men in that battle.

=== Establishment of Morgantown ===
In 1782, after resolution of the Pennsylvania–Virginia boundary dispute made his home a part of Pennsylvania, the Monongalia County seat was moved south, first to Colonel John Evans's home and ultimately to Zackquill Morgan's home in present-day Morgantown. The county court was held in Morgan's home while a courthouse was constructed in the public square in what was then called Morgan's Town. The wooden courthouse was completed sometime between 1782 and 1785 at a cost of $250. It was at about this time (1784) that George Washington visited the area. In October 1785, at Colonel Morgan's request, the Virginia General Assembly specified that 50 acres (200,000 m^{2}) of his land was to be laid out in lots of a half acre each, and a town, named Morgans-Town, established on the site. The lots were to be auctioned off and the proceeds given to Colonel Morgan. Initially, the land deeds required purchasers to build a house of at least 18 square feet (1.7 m^{2}) on the lot within four years, but because of Indian hostilities the four-year time limit was extended in 1789 by the Virginia General Assembly to an additional five years. Morgantown was established by an act reading as follows:

Be it enacted by the General Assembly that 50 acres (200,000 m^{2}) of land, the property of Zackquill Morgan, lying in the county of Monongalia shall be laid out in lots of half an acre each, with convenient streets which shall be established as a town by the name of "Morgans Town".

In 2016, a statue commemorating Morgan's role in founding Morgantown was erected near the town's Spruce Street parking garage. Commissioned by the City of Morgantown, it was created by sculptor Jamie Lester.

=== Later years ===
Zackquill Morgan opened the town's first tavern in 1783. Before his death in 1795, he lived in a house on Front Street later owned by his son Zackquill (1782–1814). This is the house in which Drusilla A., granddaughter of Zackquill I (daughter of Elizabeth Madera, 1786–1858) was born in 1814 and in which she lived continuously until her death in 1904. There is another granddaughter of Zackquill I named Drusulia Morgan (1795–1870) who married James Price (daughter of James B. Morgan and Dorothy Prickett).

The inventory of Zackquill Morgan's personal property, made on December 6, 1795, by James Dunn, Morgan Morgan, and Richard Merrifield, included the following: 1 mare and colt 10 pounds 15 shillings; 1 old red cow 2 pounds; 1 old red cow and bell and collar 2.7.6; 1 dark brown heifer (3 years old) 2.10.6; 1 cow and calf 2.7.6; 1 small year-old heifer .15; 1 small year-old steer .15; 2 hogs @ .15 each 1.10; 1 sow and 3 shotes, .24, 2.14; 1 pair plow irons .25; 5 sheep @ 9/6 3.12; 1 coat, wescot and pair of stocking 4; 1 bed and furniture 5; 7 pewter plates and 1 pewter salt cellar .13.3; 1 old tea kettle; 1 candle stick; 2 flat irons; 1 old iron kettle and hooks 6/3; 1 pot and 2 trimels .15, 1.13; total 47 pounds and 14 shillings.

== Family ==
Zackquill Morgan was born on September 8, 1735, in Orange (later Frederick) County, Virginia (later Berkeley County, West Virginia). He died on January 1, 1795, in Morgantown, Monongalia County, Virginia (later West Virginia). He married Nancy Paxton in 1755 in Frederick County, Virginia (later Berkeley County, West Virginia). Paxton was born in 1735 in Somerset County, New Jersey and died in 1762 in Augusta County, Virginia. Together they had the following children:

- Nancy Anne Morgan – born 1759 in Augusta, Hampshire, West Virginia, died 1816 also in Augusta. Nancy Morgan first married John Pierpont in 1774, the son of Francis Pierpoint Jr. and Sarah Richardson. He was born in 1742 in Frederick, Maryland and died on March 4, 1796, in Morgantown. Her second marriage was to William Stephenson.
- Temperance Morgan – born in 1760 in Morgantown and died on May 28, 1849, in Augusta, Virginia. She married James Cochran on July 20, 1777.
- Evan Morgan – born in 1762 in Augusta, Virginia.
- Catherine Morgan – born in 1763 in Augusta, Virginia. She married Jacob Scott.

After Nancy Paxton's death, Morgan remarried to Drusilla Springer on September 15, 1765, in Frederick County, Virginia. Springer was the daughter of Dennis Springer Sr. and Ann Prickett. She was born on May 9, 1746, in Burlington County, New Jersey and died in August 1796 in Morgantown. Morgan and Springer had the following children:

- Levi Morgan – born on June 26, 1766, in Morgantown and died in 1828 in Jefferson, Kentucky. He married Elizabeth Graham, the daughter of Elias Graham and Margaret Brewer, on October 13, 1815. She was born in 1797 and died on July 19, 1887, in Jefferson.
- Morgan Morgan – born on November 7, 1767, and died in 1852. He first married Mary Hanet and later married Susannah Martin.
- Charles W. Morgan – born on October 28, 1769, and died in 1819.
- James Morgan – born on November 24, 1771, and died on May 24, 1855. He married Dorothy Prickett in 1796.
- Uriah Morgan – born on July 22, 1774, and died in 1851. He married Sarah Prickett.
- Zadock Morgan – born on July 24, 1776.
- Horatio Morgan – born on April 9, 1778.
- Zackquill Morgan II – born on August 1, 1782, and died in 1813. He married Elizabeth Madera on April 7, 1806.
- Sarah Morgan – born on February 11, 1784. She married James Clelland in 1818.
- Hannah Morgan – born on December 9, 1786, and died on May 27, 1860. She married David Barker on January 2, 1810.
- Drusilla Morgan – born on October 9, 1788. She married Jacob Rives Swisher on April 26, 1810, in Morgantown. He was born in May 1785 in Winchester, Frederick, Virginia and died on February 13, 1858.
- Rachel Morgan – born on June 29, 1790, and died in January 1864.

== See also ==
- Cool Spring Farm (Gerrardstown, West Virginia)
