= Cool Spring Farm (Charles Town, West Virginia) =

Historic house in West Virginia, United States

- U.S. National Register of Historic Places
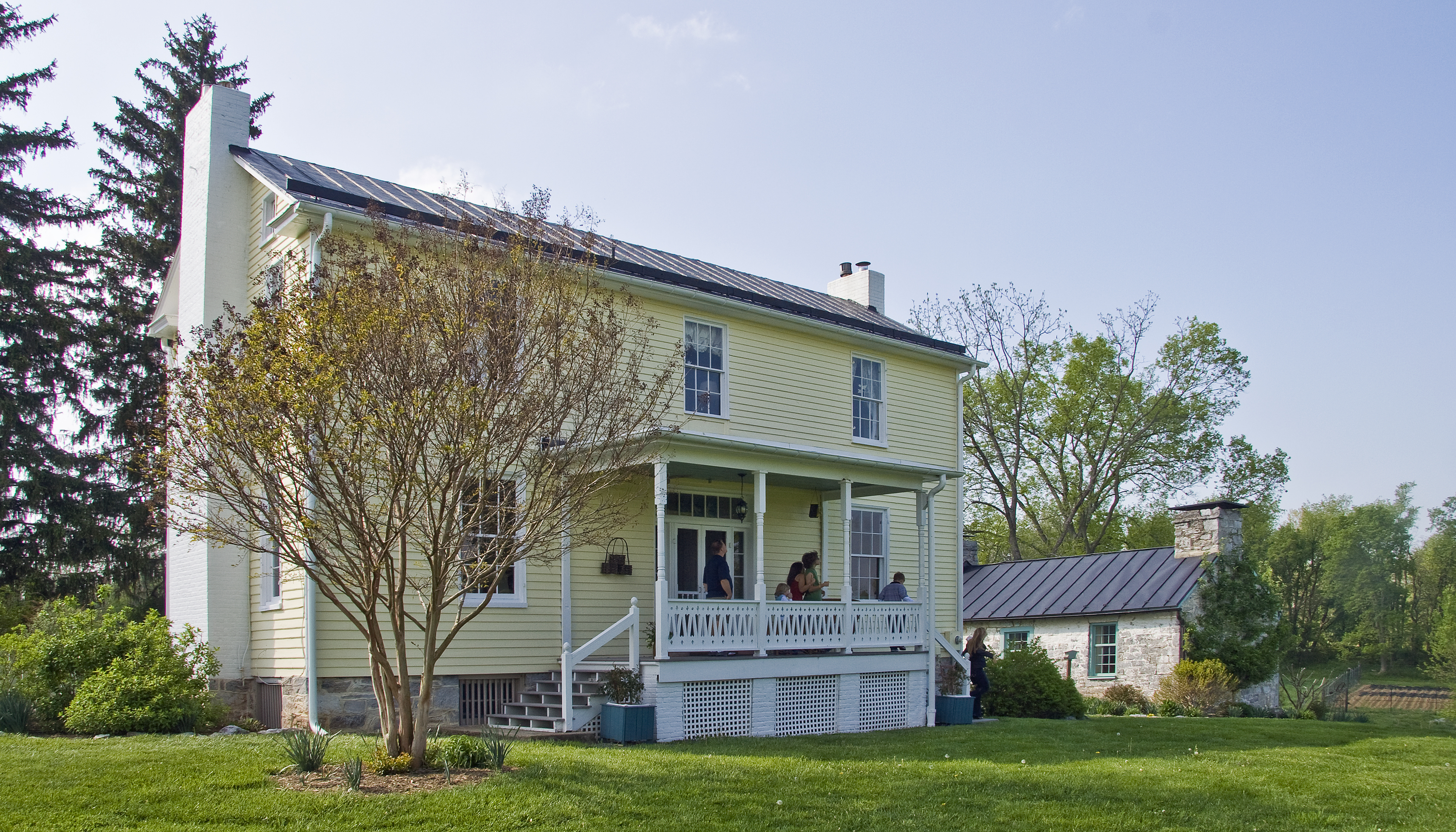

- Location within West Virginia Location within the United States
- Nearest city: Charles Town, West Virginia
- Coordinates: 39°14′44″N 77°55′55″W
- Area: 68 acres (28 ha)
- Built: 1813
- Architectural style: Greek Revival, Federal
- NRHP reference No.: 07000239
- Added to NRHP: March 27, 2007

Cool Spring Farm, located near Charles Town, West Virginia was first established along Bullskin Run around 1750. The Federal style second house on the property, built in 1813, is extant, with a Greek Revival–influenced third house, built in 1832 that shows the evolution of the farmstead. The farm is significant as an example of agricultural development in the Bullskin Run district and as examples of Greek Revival and Federal style vernacular design.

== Description ==
The farm complex is sited to the south of Bullskin Run. The principal buildings are the stone 1813 house, the frame 1832 house, several outbuildings and a remnant of a bank barn, now enclosed with modern construction. The 1832 house is the main house, located on a hill overlooking the stream and the remainder of the complex. The house features rooms on either side of a center stair hall, with a service extension to the rear, now extended with modern construction. The upper level matches the lower level. The clapboarded house is on a limestone foundation, with brick chimneys at either end. The front porch was added in the 1890s. The 1813 stone house is a one-story, four-bay structure built in local limestone, using large stone blocks. The interior presently has two rooms, with traces of greater subdivision in the past. The spring house is from the same era, built in stone. Other buildings date to the early 20th century.

== History ==
The lands surrounding Cool Spring Farm were first surveyed in 1734. Joshua Haines, a Quaker from New Jersey, bought a 700-acre (280 ha)portion of the lands in 1750 from Benjamin Borden, Jr. of Augusta, Virginia. In 1752 his brother Abraham bought 314 acres (127 ha) from Joshua. An adjoining 422-acre (171 ha) tract was sold in 1750 to George Washington. The following year a deed of partition adjusted the boundary between the Haines and Washington lands. The property passed to Mary Haines Collett and her husband Daniel, while the Washington property became Bushrod Washington's Rock Hall estate. The Colletts sold their property i 1812 or 1813 to one or both of the Myers brothers, John and Jacob. At about this time the stone Federal house was built on the property. The land was sold again in 1830 by John and Susannah Myers to Thomas Griggs, Jr., who built the Greek Revival house.

In 1857 Griggs sold the farm, then 146 acres (59 ha), to Ambrose Timberlake. The property, unlike many in Jefferson County, was not greatly affected during the American Civil War. In 1869 the farm passed to Adam Young. The Young family kept the property for almost 100 years. By 1925 they had named it Cool Spring Farm. In 1944 the Young family sold the farm to the Blakely Corporation. Three months later the property, now at 124 acres (50 ha) was sold to the Victor Product Corporation. This company was owned by Raymond Funkhouser, whose hobby was buying and restoring properties in the area that had been owned by the Washington family. Funkhouser leased the adjoining Rock Hall farm, which had been Washington property. The property was sold in 1951 and has passed through several hands, with the overall acreage reduced to 68 acres (28 ha).

Cool Spring Farm was placed on the National Register of Historic Places on March 27, 2007.

== See also ==
- Cool Spring Farm (Gerrardstown, West Virginia)
