= Cool Spring Farm (Gerrardstown, West Virginia) =

Historic house in West Virginia, United States

- U.S. National Register of Historic Places
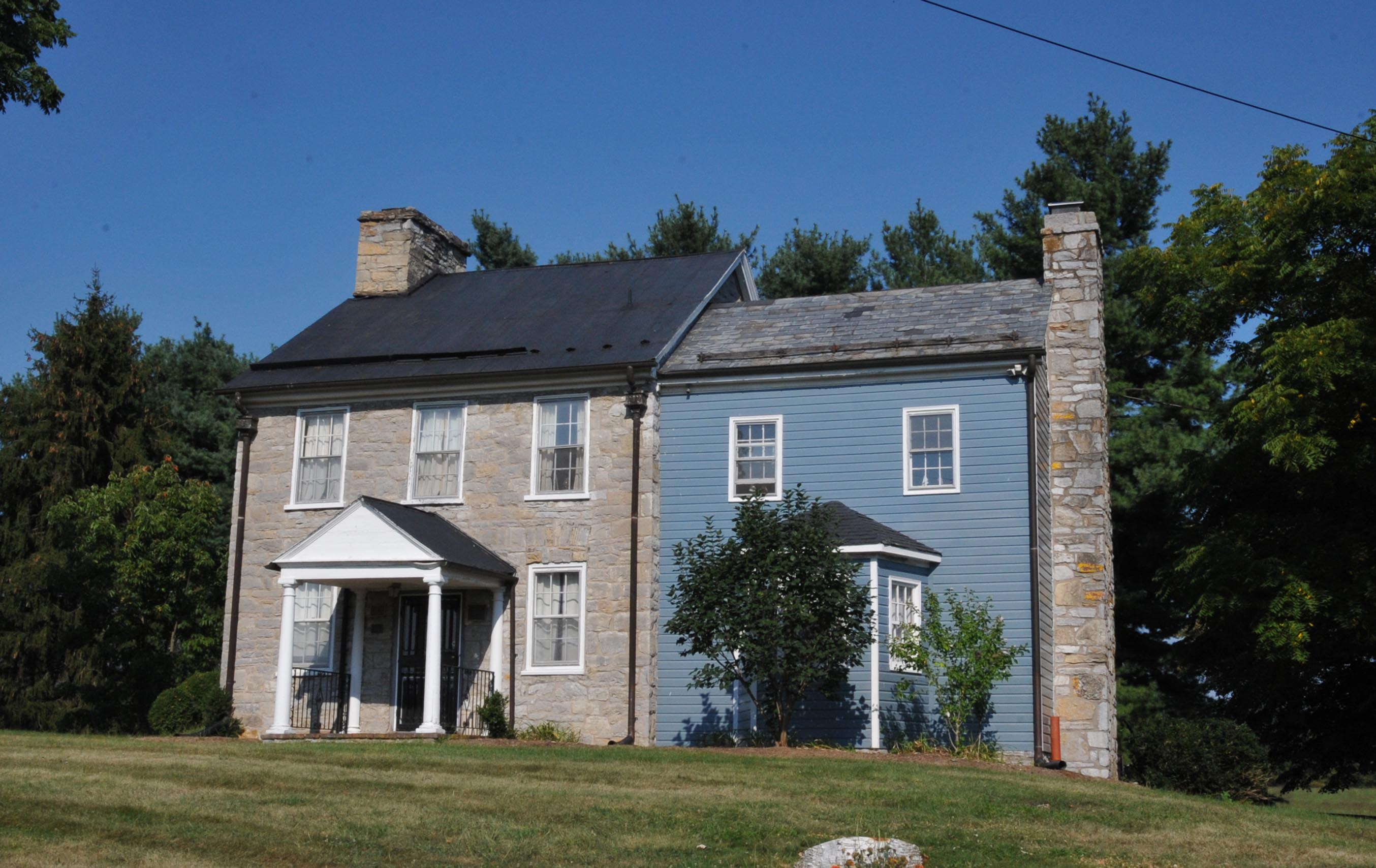

- Location within West Virginia Location within the United States
- Location: Berkeley County, West Virginia, USA
- Nearest city: Gerrardstown, West Virginia
- Coordinates: 39°19′53″N 78°6′23″W
- Built: 1761
- Architectural style: Federal
- NRHP reference No.: 94001292
- Added to NRHP: November 21, 1994

Cool Spring Farm, also known as Rockdale Spring Farm and Torytown, was a wilderness estate settled by Colonel Morgan Morgan (1688–1766), long celebrated as the first permanent European settler in what would become West Virginia. The Welsh-born Morgan was granted 1,000 acres (4.0 km^{2}) on the property in 1735, but he is believed to have first settled there in 1731. Recent research indicates that Morgan's settlement was not the first, but was preceded by a German settlement at what became "New Mecklinberg", possibly as early as 1726.

Morgan Morgan's seventh son, Zackquill Morgan (1735–1795), built the house at Cool Spring Farm in 1761, but sold it in 1765 and moved west to Monongalia County, Virginia (now in West Virginia), to establish his namesake settlement of Morgantown in 1781.

After changing hands several times, Cool Spring Farm was purchased by John McKown, Jr. in 1827. His son Edmund renamed the farm "Rockdale Spring Farm". The sons of John McKown owned considerable land in the area of Gerrardstown during the late 19th century.

In 1994, the original house built by Zackquill Morgan at Cool Spring Farm was listed on the United States National Register of Historic Places.

== See also ==
- Cool Spring Farm (Charles Town, West Virginia)
