= Morgan Chapel and Graveyard =

Historic church in West Virginia, United States

- U.S. National Register of Historic Places
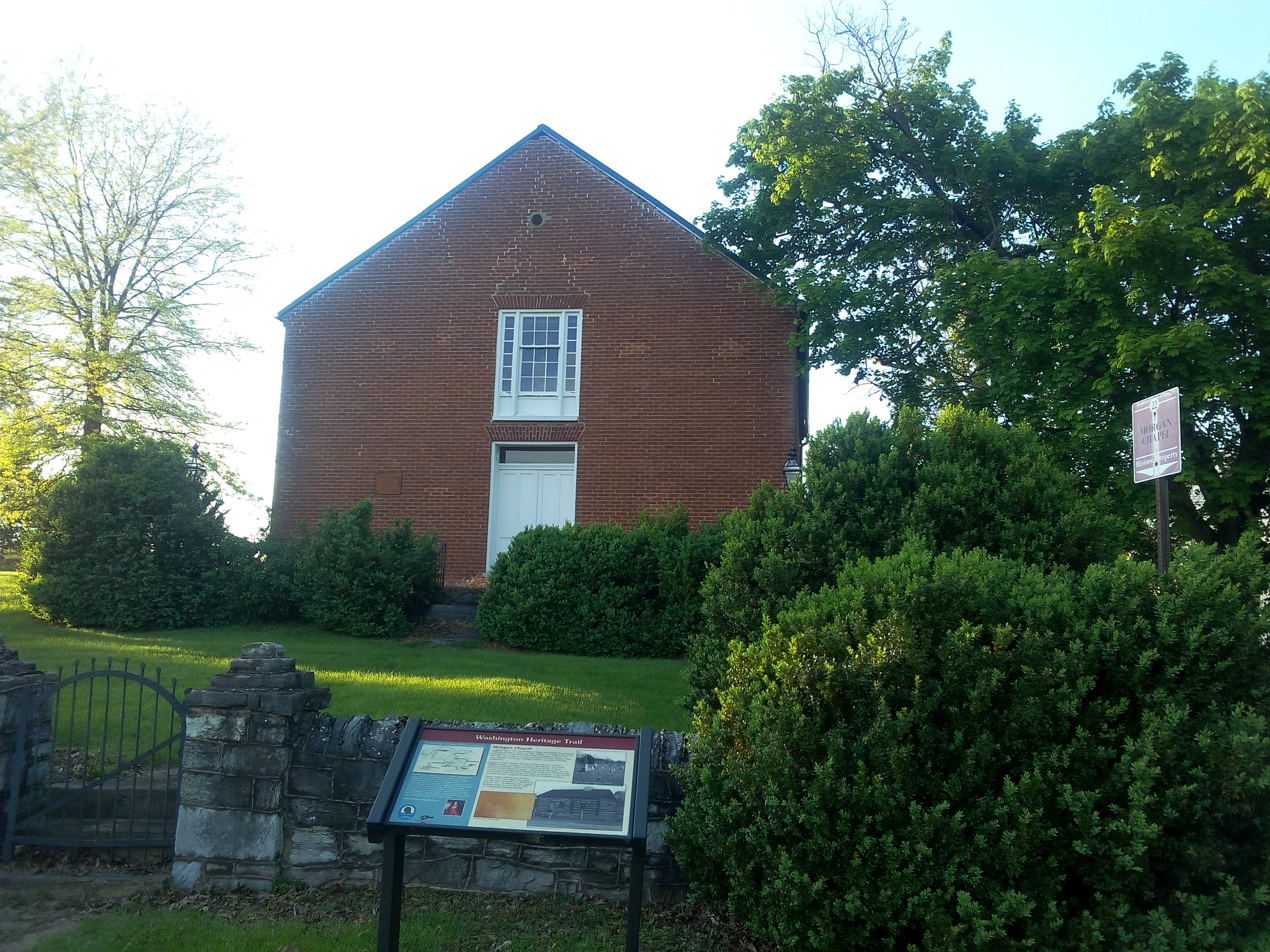
- Morgan Chapel and Graveyard

- Location within West Virginia Location within the United States
- Location: 185 Runnymeade Road (Northern side of Secondary Route 26 west of its junction with U.S. Route 11), Bunker Hill, West Virginia
- Coordinates: 39°20′1″N 78°3′28″W
- Area: 2 acres (0.81 ha)
- Built: 1741
- Architectural style: Greek Revival
- NRHP reference No.: 84003480
- Added to NRHP: January 12, 1984

Morgan Chapel and Graveyard – also known as Christ Episcopal Church-Bunker Hill – is a historic church in Bunker Hill, Berkeley County, West Virginia. It is the oldest Episcopal church congregation in West Virginia and located geographically in the Episcopal Diocese of West Virginia.

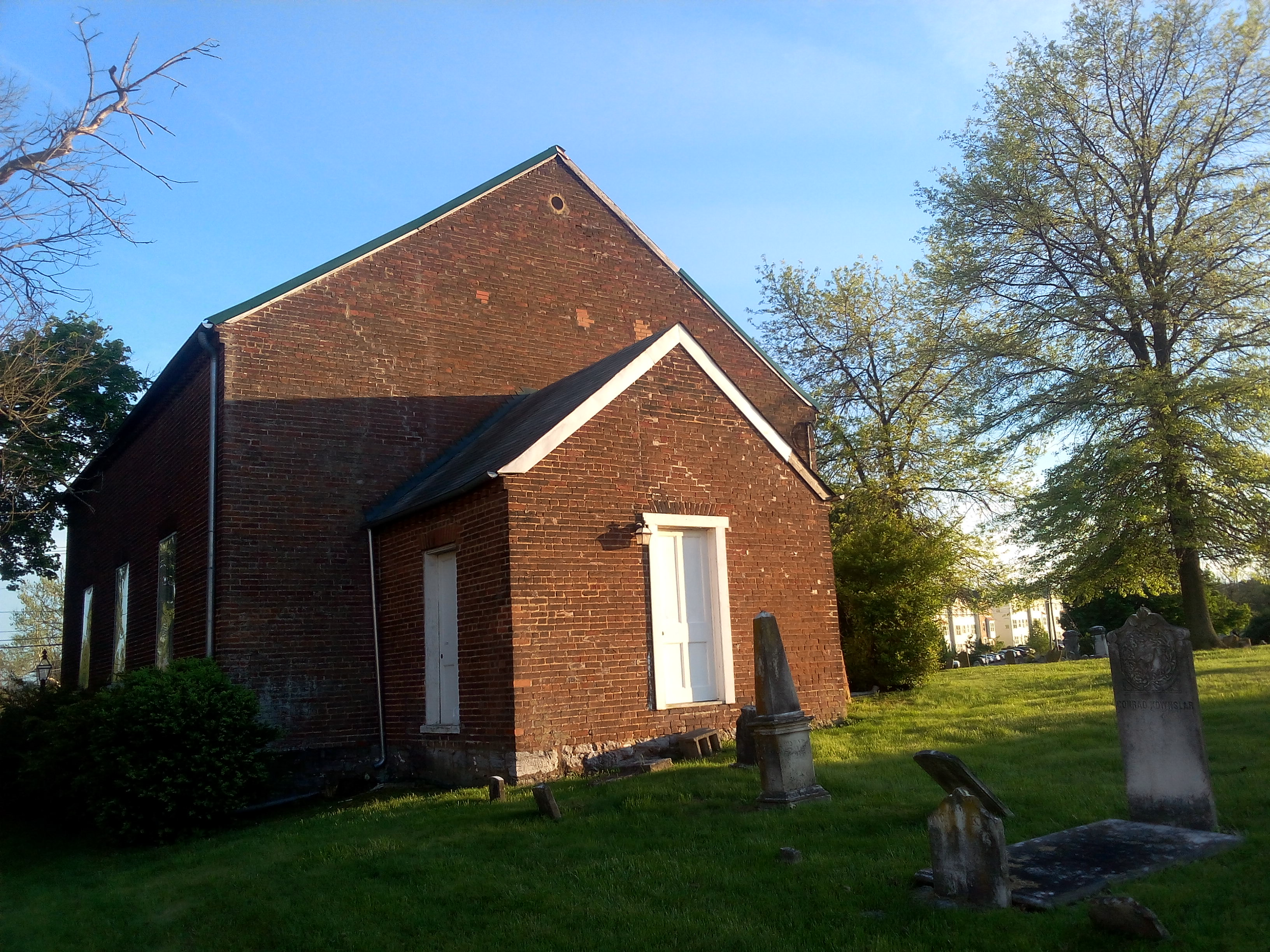
rear view from graveyard

In 1741 Morgan Morgan, one of West Virginia's earliest settlers, built the original log church on this site, about halfway between his cabin and the mill. Soon a cemetery was established.

The current Greek Revival building was constructed in 1851. Morgan Morgan I, II, III, and IV are all buried in the church cemetery, although the historic marker for Morgan Morgan is over a mile away near the town center and mill. Morgan Morgan's descendants later founded Morgantown, West Virginia. Also buried in the graveyard is noted American portrait artist John Drinker (1760–1826), a Quaker who may have been a conductor on the Underground Railroad along with his wife Elizabeth. His former house is also on the National Register of Historic Places.

During the American Civil War, both Union and Confederate troops encamped nearby and some in the chapel, as shown by recently uncovered graffiti. The diocese is currently seeking funds for further restoration. The closest local Episcopal parish is now Grace Episcopal Church in Middleway, West Virginia, several miles eastward on the Middleway Pike. Until recently, that parish had used this chapel for at least one worship service each year (in September); other denominations and special events occasionally used it until the restoration commenced.

Morgan Chapel was listed on the National Register of Historic Places in 1984,

== See also ==
- Morgan Morgan
