= Continental Clay Brick Plant =

- U.S. National Register of Historic Places
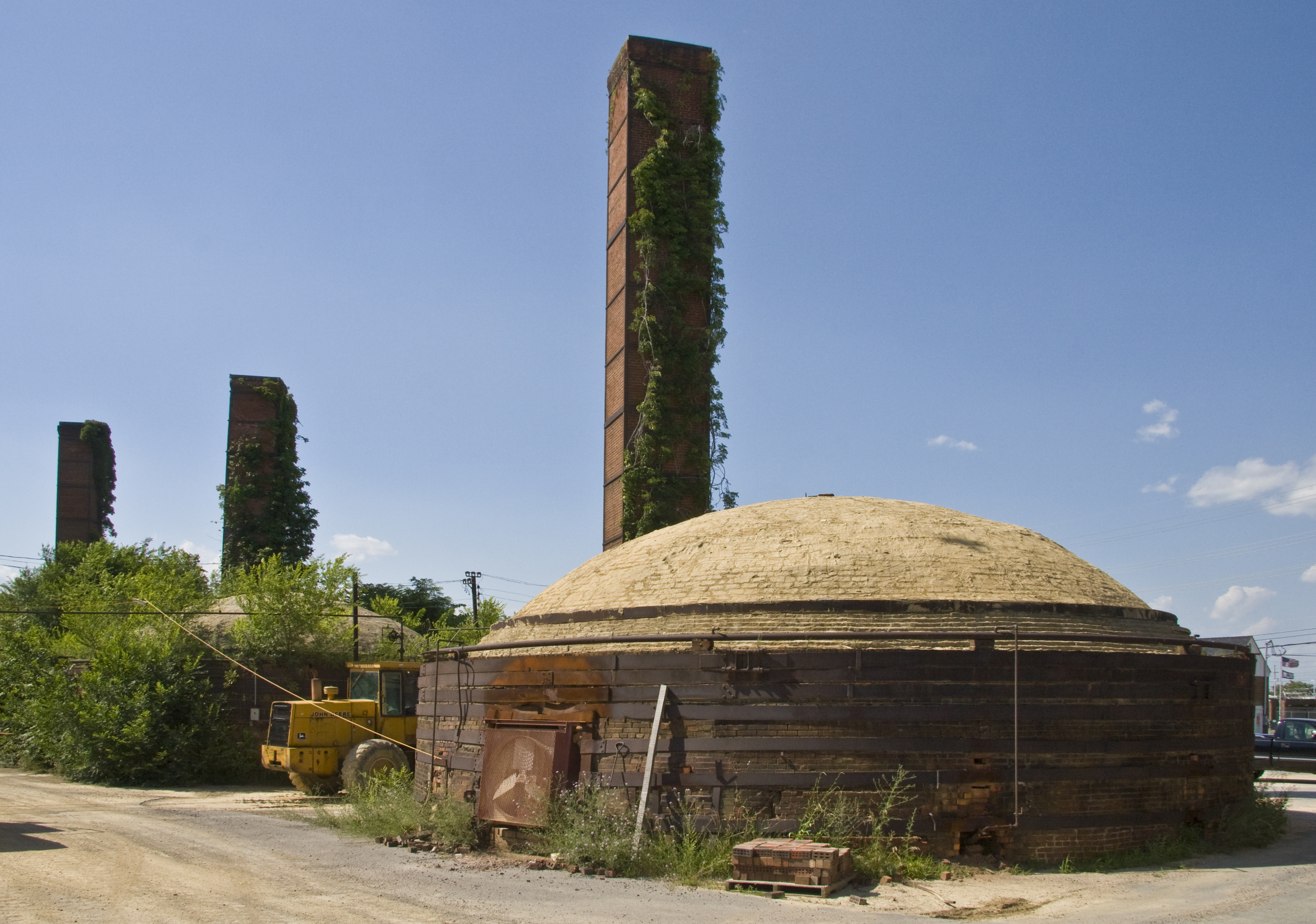

- Location within West Virginia Location within the United States
- Location: Martinsburg, West Virginia
- Coordinates: 39°25′59″N 77°57′31″W
- Built: 1917
- MPS: Berkeley County MRA
- NRHP reference No.: 80004439
- Added to NRHP: December 10, 1980

The Continental Clay Brick Plant in Martinsburg, West Virginia includes a number of beehive brick kilns. Originally a coal-fired brickworks, it was later converted to natural gas. The kilns are now largely disused, except for a few used to dry sand.

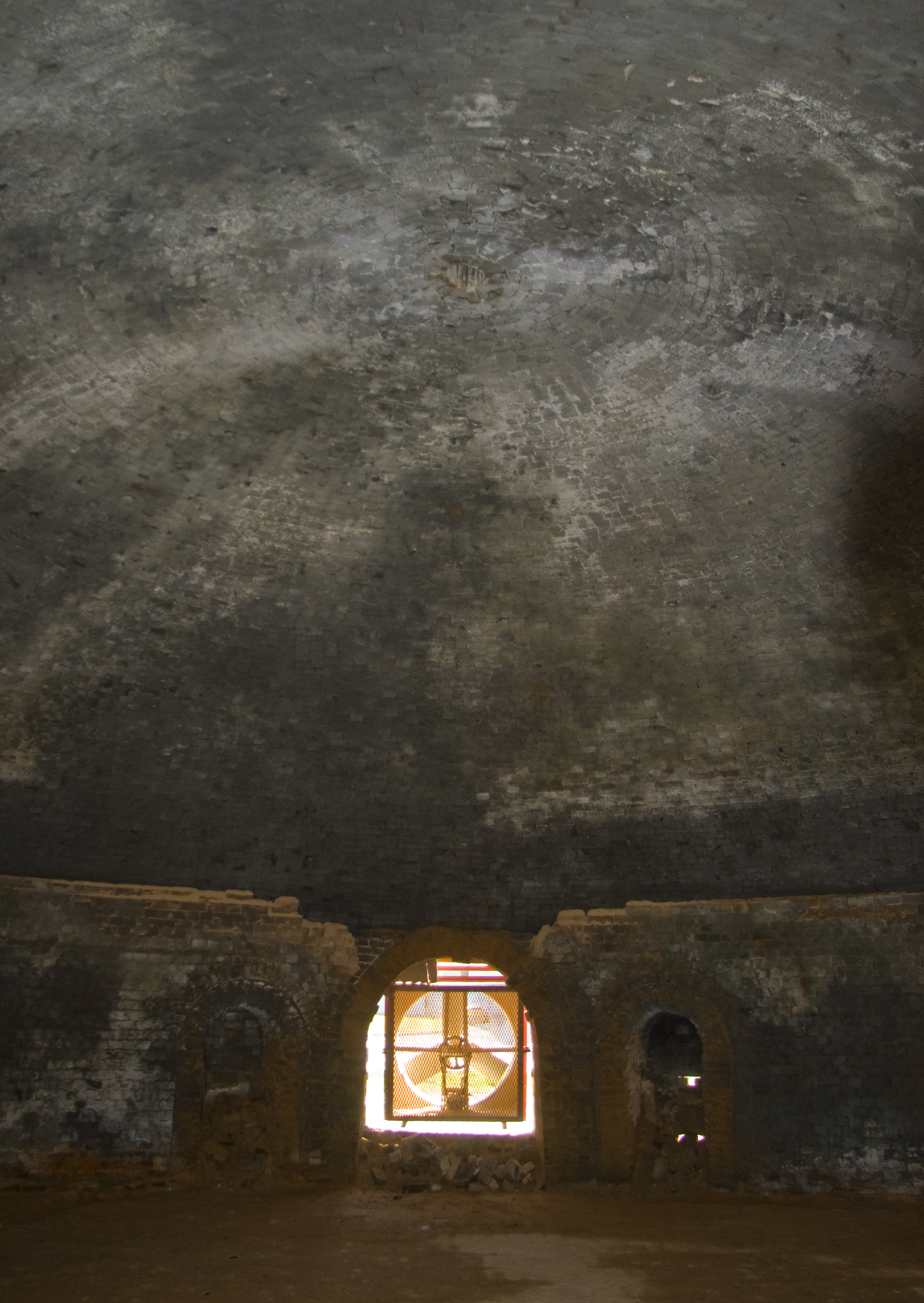
Interior of kiln
