= Morgan Morgan =

American pioneer (1688–1766)

- Born: November 1, 1688; Glamorganshire, Wales
- Died: November 17, 1766 (aged 78); Bunker Hill, Virginia Colony
- Known for: Early settler of West Virginia

Colonel Morgan Morgan (November 1, 1688 — November 17, 1766) was an American pioneer. He was thought to have founded the first permanent settlement in present-day West Virginia at Cool Spring Farm. He played a role in early colonial government, was associated with the Anglican Church, and became the progenitor of a prominent frontier family whose descendants founded towns and shaped regional development.

== Biography ==
=== Early life ===
Little direct evidence of Morgan's early life and education has survived. His birth date seems to have been November 1, 1688 because Morgan Chapel at Bunker Hill, which he helped to found, recorded the following upon his death: "Colonel Morgan died November 17, 1766 aged 78 years November 1st." No British records have been found of where he was born or when or how he came to America, but according to American records he seems to have been born in Glamorganshire, Wales during the reign of William III. (Note: The only information comes from the bible of David, the grandson on David Morgan, the Indian Fighter, and the second son of Col. Morgan. Morgan Morgan was probably educated at the University of Cambridge, a Reformed and even Puritan institution at that time.)

=== Emigration to America ===
Morgan Morgan emigrated to the America as a single man at the age of 24, probably during the last years of the reign of Queen Anne. Arriving in Delaware in about 1712 or 1713, he soon afterward got married, but no record of the date has been found. Morgan commenced business as a merchant at the place now known as Christiana. Some Quaker records record that Morgan Morgan was educated at Cambridge University and went to Delaware as Crown Council. (Note: Hopewell Quaker files from Hinshaw's Encyclopedia of Quaker Genealogy gives added information.) In 1713, Morgan married Catherine Garretson in what is now New Castle County, Delaware. Their first child, James, was born in the fall of 1715, and this is recorded in the church register. Morgan evidently arrived with some money and had a very respectable social standing, for the early records list him as a merchant and tailor, and in 1717 he was appointed as executor of the will of the Lieutenant Governor of Pennsylvania. At that time what we now know as Delaware was a part of Pennsylvania.

Since the trade guilds were very strong in England, one wonders if he learned the tailoring trade in London, from his father, or if he bypassed the law in the new country and started a combined mercantile and tailoring business. As well as working there as a merchant, he was also a magistrate. He has been claimed to have been an ordained Church of England clergyman, and one who established a church in Westminster County in 1727, but there is no evidence to support this. Morgan is often incorrectly cited as having arrived at present-day West Virginia in 1727, although he was still living in Delaware at that time, acting as the coroner of New Castle County. His first land transaction on record dates from November 20, 1723, when he bought 245 acres (0.99 km^{2}) for the price of 70 pounds. Almost the whole of this land was cultivable. In 1924, a committee appointed by the Governor of West Virginia determined that the first crude shelter erected by William G. Morgan Great Grandson of Morgan Morgan was built on the Morgan Acres property.

=== Claim of first settlement in West Virginia ===
Morgan Morgan arrived in what is now West Virginia in 1731. In January 1734, he, among others, was appointed to the 'Commission of the Peace', meaning that he was a magistrate. He probably received a Patent for 1,000 acres (4.0 km^{2}) '[i]n the Forks of the Rappahannock River & Westwood of Sherrando River' on December 12, 1734. The long-standing claim that he was the first permanent resident there is, however, doubtful. In fact, the area now known as Shepherdstown, West Virginia, was probably settled by German-speaking immigrants as early as 1727.

Morgan died at Bunker Hill, Berkeley County, now in West Virginia, and was buried in the Morgan Chapel Graveyard.

Morgan Morgan is remembered in local folklore as a pioneering figure, sometimes mythologized as a lone settler carving civilization out of wilderness. His story has appeared in regional histories, school curricula, and heritage tourism materials.

== Family ==
Morgan Morgan held military and civil positions in colonial Virginia which entitled his female descendants to membership in the Colonial Dames of America. Col. Morgan and his wife Catherine Garretson had the following issues:

1. James Morgan - Died at the age of
2. Ann Morgan (Considered one of the 'Lost Tribes' of the Morgan Family)
3. David Morgan (The Great Indian Fighter)
4. Charles Morgan (Considered one of the 'Lost Tribes' of the Morgan Family)I have Charles Morgan's Will. Charles Morgan had a daughter, Rachel Morgan. She married John Stewart, Rachel's husband witnessed Charles Morgan's Will.
5. Henry Morgan (Considered one of the 'Lost Tribes' of the Morgan Family)
6. Evan Morgan
7. Zackquill Morgan (Founder of Morgantown, West Virginia)
8. Morgan Morgan II

== Y-DNA Haplogroup ==
The MORGAN Surname Y-DNA Project has among the donor test subjects, a man with the surname Morgan who traced his paternal line to Morgan Morgan. His haplogroup is R-M269. However, this assignment is virtually useless, including all unbroken male-line descendants of a man who lived 6500 years ago.

A project donor who traced his paternal line to Lewis Morgan of Rhea County, Tennessee also has the haplogroup R-M269. The donor is a descendant of Mary Morgan, a widow who brought her children Lewis, John, George Washington, Willis, and likely a daughter named Mary Morgan from South Carolina to Rhea County Tennessee c. 1800. No primary source records stating or implying the identity of the patriarch of the family have been found. The maiden name of his wife Mary is also unproven. Autosomal DNA matches suggest that the Rhea County descendants could be among the "lost tribe" descendants of Charles Morgan or Henry Morgan.

== See also ==
- Morgan Chapel and Graveyard
- Morgan Morgan Monument
