= Bunker Hill, West Virginia =

Unincorporated community in West Virginia, United States

Bunker Hill
- Unincorporated community
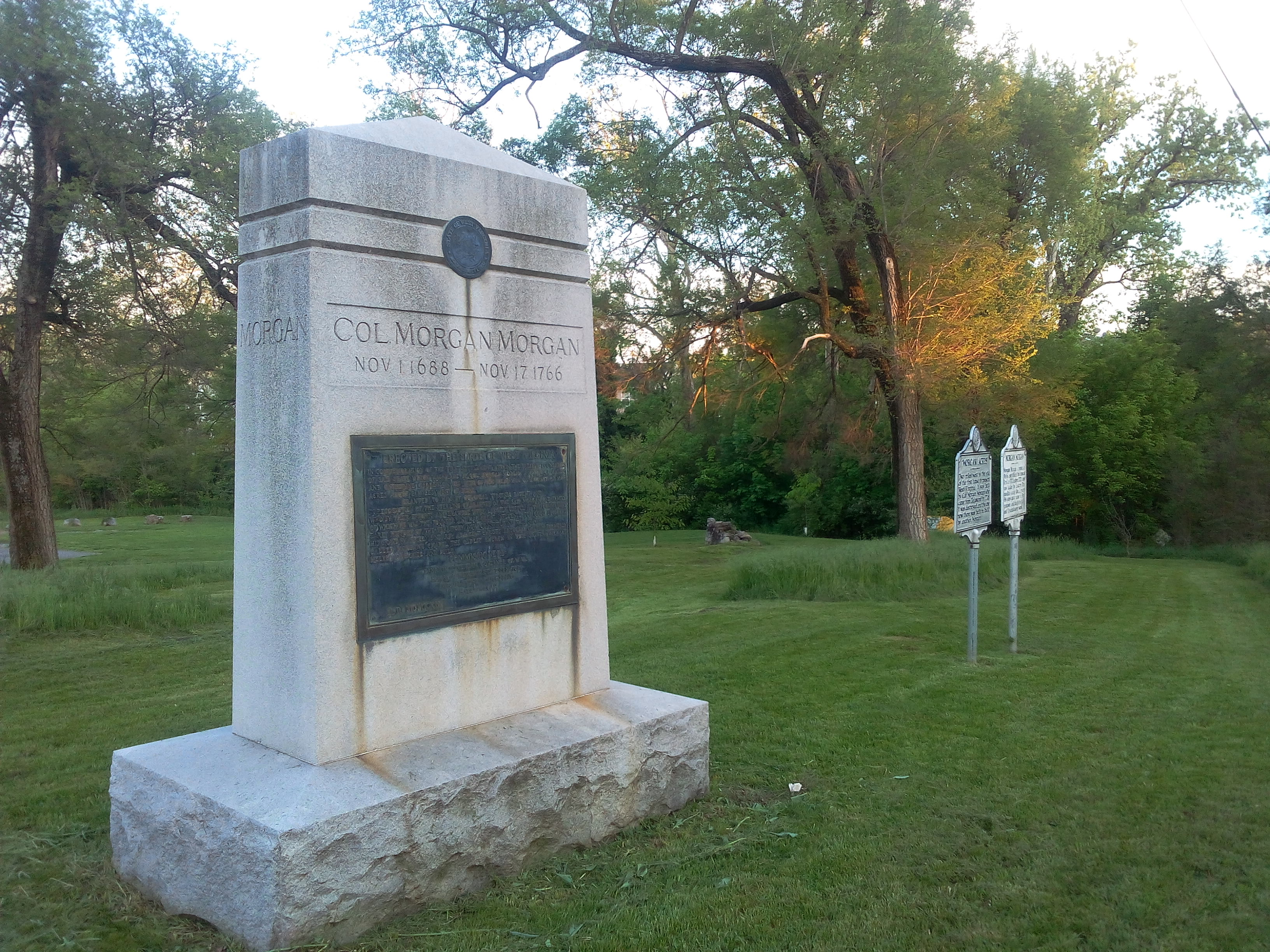
- Morgan Morgan Monument

- Location within the state of West Virginia Bunker Hill (the United States)
- Coordinates: 39°20′00″N 78°03′16″W
- Country: United States
- State: West Virginia
- County: Berkeley
- Elevation: 568 ft (173 m)

Population (2000)
  - Total: 5,319
- Time zone: UTC-5 (Eastern (EST))
  - Summer (DST): UTC-4 (EDT)
- ZIP codes: 25413
- GNIS feature ID: 1554028

Bunker Hill is an unincorporated community in Berkeley County, West Virginia, United States, located in the lower Shenandoah Valley on Winchester Pike (U.S. Route 11) at its junction with County Route 26 south of Martinsburg. It is the site of the confluence of Torytown Run and Mill Creek, a tributary of Opequon Creek which flows into Winchester, Virginia. According to the 2000 census, the Bunker Hill community has a population of 5,319.

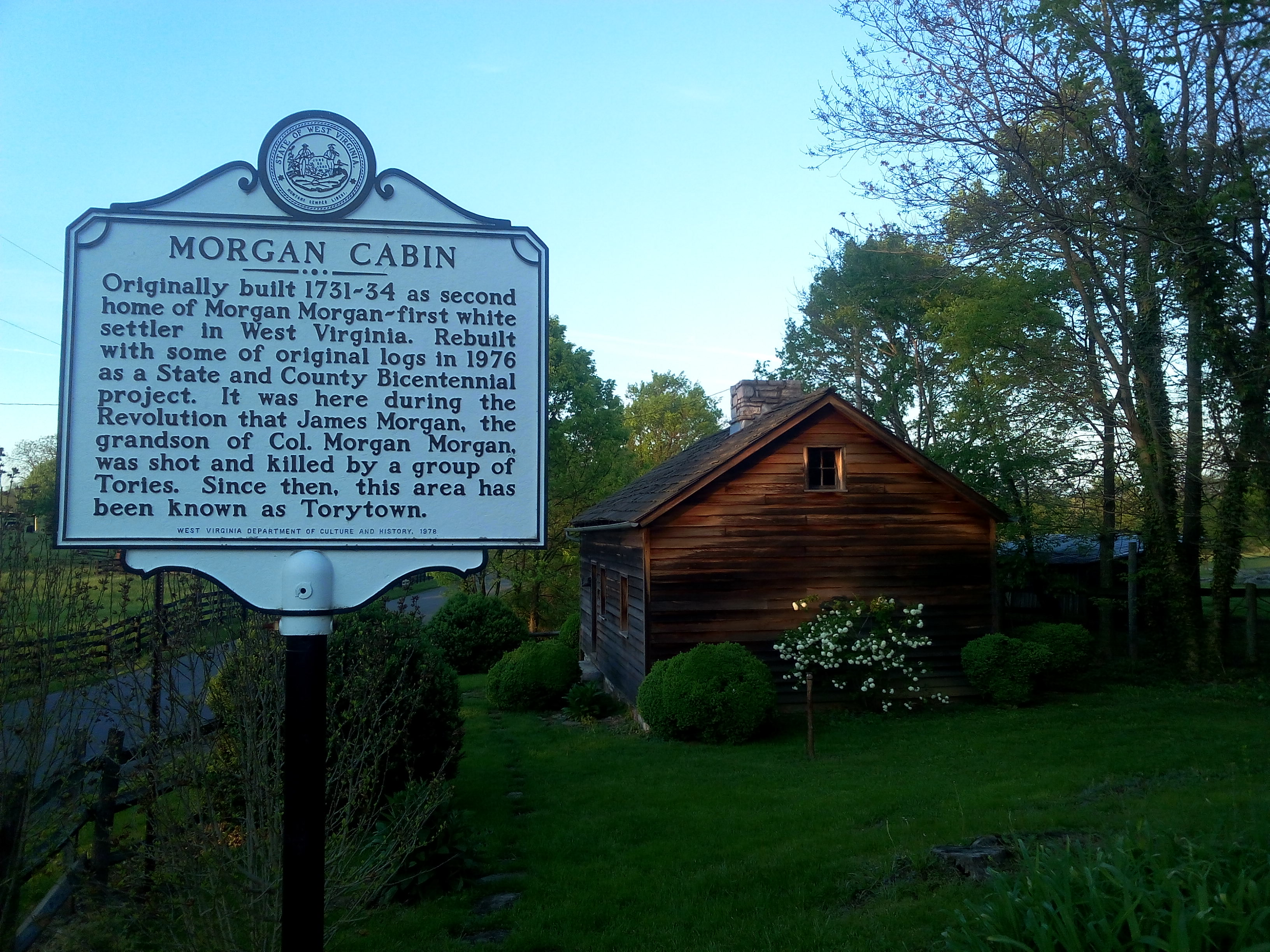
Morgan Cabin state park

== History ==
At Bunker Hill in 1726, Colonel Morgan Morgan (1687–1766) founded the first permanent settlement of record in the part of Virginia that became West Virginia during the American Civil War, although that cabin was destroyed in the French and Indian War. Morgan's kinfolk rebuilt the cabin before the American Revolutionary War, and Tory sympathizers killed Morgan's grandson James Morgan near the cabin on what became known as Torytown Creek about four miles outside the Bunker Hill town center, on Runnymeade Street (a/k/a County Route 26 west of town). That cabin (now a small state park) was restored as a Bicentennial project in 1976, using many of its original logs. Now a historically furnished museum, it also serves as headquarters of the Morgan Cabin Committee.

The state of West Virginia erected several monuments to Morgan nearby. Near the town center and a bridge over Mill Creek is Morgan Park, which has a large monument erected to honor the first settler in 1924, as well as two historic markers. Both Morgan and George Washington are also remembered at the Morgan Chapel and Graveyard less than 2 miles from the town center, en route to the Morgan cabin.

Near the Virginia state line, Payne's Chapel United Methodist Church was founded in 1762, rebuilt in brick and dedicated in 1851, but burned down of unknown causes in 1902, only to be rebuilt and rededicated three years later. Several other historic United Methodist churches still stand along Route 11(the Winchester Highway) beginning with Bunker Hill United Methodist Church in town, then Inwood and Darkesville United Methodist churches to the west. Another of the three churches in the historic district, Bunker Hill Presbyterian Church, was built in 1854, rebuilt after heavy damage in the Civil War, and rededicated in 1879. The historic Mt. Tabor Baptist Church, founded in the 1780s slightly outside the modern town (now in Lewisburg, West Virginia), transferred from a white congregation to a black congregation, with judicial permission, after the Civil War.

Bunker Hill's Mill Creek Historic District includes Morgan Park and structures abutting Mill Creek for about five miles, and so includes the town's and Berkeley County's earliest industrial center, three bridges (including the county's first railroad bridge), four mills, and several old residences (including former log cabins and stone structures, some in ruins). The Sherrard Mill became a residence in the 1930s, and only the millrace remains of the Gray Mill. The Bunker Hill Mill, a gristmill that contains 19th and 20th centuries milling equipment, is the only one still in operating condition. That mill constructed in 1738 was rebuilt in 1890 and is now the only mill in the state featuring dual water wheels.

A small Civil War skirmish between the Union Army and the Confederate Army occurred near Bunker Hill on July 17, 1861. Also Confederate General J. Johnston Pettigrew of North Carolina was mortally wounded during his army's retreat to Virginia a few days after the Battle of Gettysburg while redirecting troops from the flooded crossing at Falling Waters, West Virginia, and died at Edgewood Manor in Bunker Hill on July 17, 1863.

Bunker Hill has its own post office, which uses the 25413 ZIP code. Its location between Martinsburg and Winchester, Virginia along Interstate 81 and U.S. Route 11 led to residential growth beginning in the 1980s and continuing into the 21st century.
