= Middle Creek (Opequon Creek tributary) =

River in the United States of America

Middle Creek is a 9.7-mile-long (15.6 km) tributary of Opequon Creek, belonging to the Potomac River and Chesapeake Bay watersheds, located in Berkeley County in West Virginia's Eastern Panhandle.

== Headwaters and course ==
Middle Creek's source is located on the eastern foothills of North Mountain (1644 feet/501 m) southwest of Martinsburg. From its headwaters, Middle Creek is a small meandering stream that curves southward paralleling Poorhouse Road until its junction with West Virginia Route 45. Throughout this stretch, Middle Creek is joined by a number of spring-fed streams off of North Mountain, most of which are used for watering animals on the area's farmlands. After it passes beneath WV 45, Middle Creek continues its course to the southeast near the community of Arden. The stream is dammed numerous times to create small lakes and ponds, as well as light rapids. Middle Creek passes under Interstate 81 and U.S. Route 11 before it meanders to the east through the town of Darkesville. From Darkesville, Middle Creek winds through a series of gorges created by rolling hills before its confluence with Opequon Creek.

== Water quality ==
The water quality of Middle Creek is very mixed. While the creek is in the North Mountain, its water quality is general good because of the low pollution and the low population of North Mountain. Its water quality dramatically drops once it joins the spring-fed streams because of agricultural run-off. Due to numerous dams though, this run-off doesn't always make it to the Opequon Creek. When it joins the Opequon, its water quality is good to moderate.

== Water flow ==
Due to water runoff during rainfall, the water flow of Middle Creek varies. In the spring, the creek's output of water is very high due to wet conditions during spring. In the summer, the water flow is usually normal, with Thunderstorms raising the water, and short-term droughts lowering the water. In the fall, the water level is usually below-normal due to dry conditions and lower rainfall. During the winter however, the creek is usually at its highest because of low evaporation caused by cold temperatures and thick cloud covers. The creek rarely freezes over, but sometimes stagnant water will freeze through.

== Flora and fauna ==
Middle Creek is home to many species of crayfish and minnow. Many species of turtles also inhabit the creek, most notably the eastern box turtle. Snakes are very common, with copperheads and garter snakes being the most numerous. Many species of mammals live near the creek's water, the biggest being the white-tailed deer. Plants types that live along the creek include grasses, water lilies, and aquatic plants. Sycamore trees, tulip trees, and willow trees dig their roots along the creeks banks.

== See also ==
- List of West Virginia rivers
