= Interstate 81 in West Virginia =

Section of the Interstate in West Virginia

Interstate 81
- I-81 highlighted in red

Route information
- Maintained by WVDOH
- Length: 26.00 mi (41.84 km)
- Existed: August 14, 1957–present
- NHS: Entire route

Major junctions
- South end: I-81 at the Virginia state line in Ridgeway
- WV 9 in Martinsburg; US 11 near Falling Waters
- North end: I-81 at the Maryland state line in Marlowe

Location
- Country: United States
- State: West Virginia
- Counties: Berkeley

Highway system
- Interstate Highway System; Main; Auxiliary; Suffixed; Business; Future; West Virginia State Highway System; Interstate; US; State
← WV 80	→ WV 82

Interstate 81 (I-81) in the US state of West Virginia crosses the Eastern Panhandle region, linking Virginia to Maryland. The Interstate Highway, completed in 1966, spans 26 miles (42 km) through Berkeley County, paralleling U.S. Route 11 (US 11) for its entire length. I-81 enters the state near Ridgeway, travels northeast, bypassing the city of Martinsburg, and leaves the state at the Potomac River, which serves as the state line. The first solicitations for the construction of I-81 were published in 1959, with the first six miles (9.7 km) of freeway being opened in 1963, and the full length was completed by 1966. On average, between 45,000 and 60,000 vehicles use the freeway through the panhandle per day.

== Route description ==
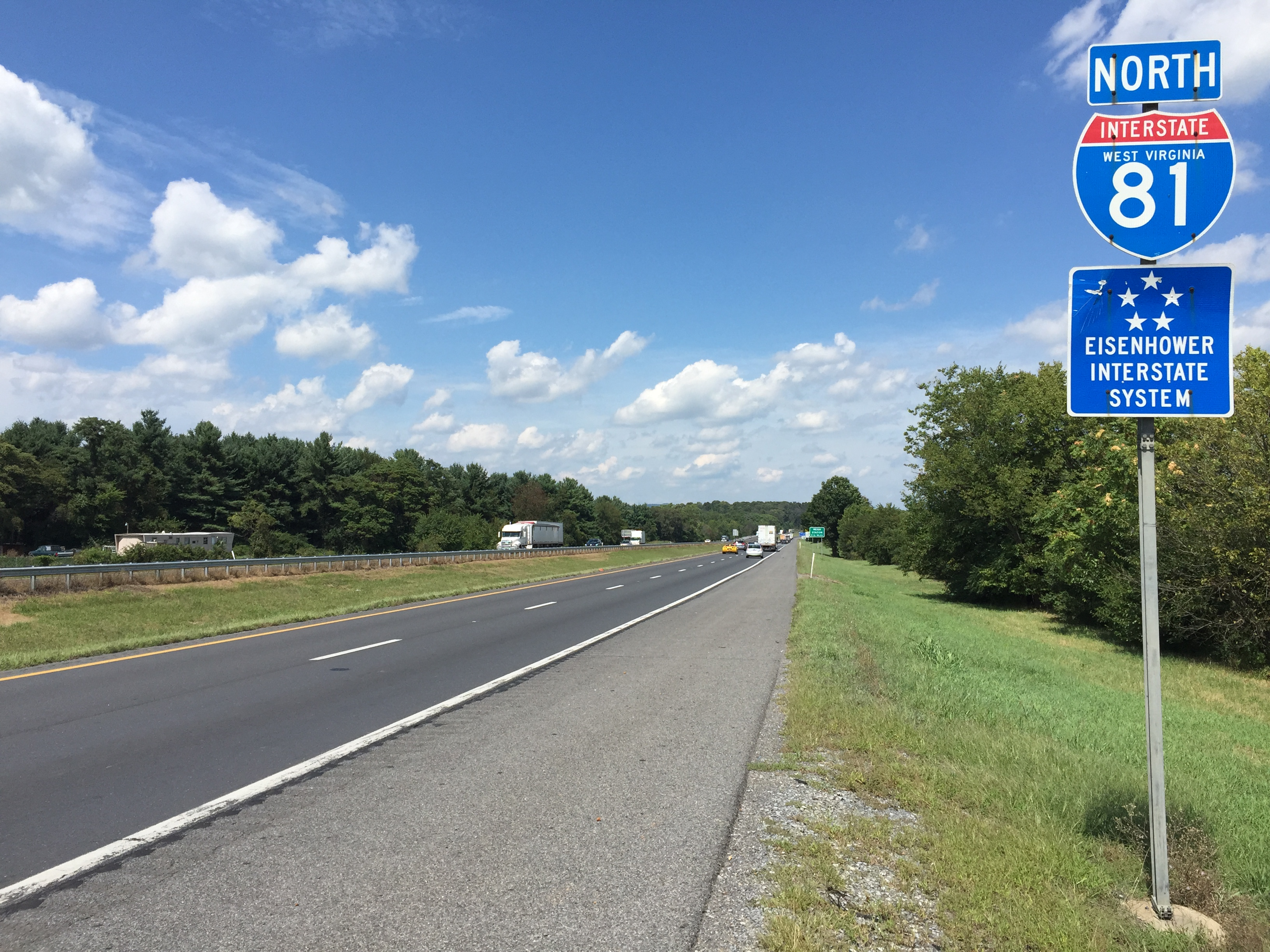
I-81 northbound near the Virginia state line

I-81 enters the Eastern Panhandle of West Virginia just west of Ridgeway, paralleling US 11 (also known as the Valley Pike). The highway passes through some light farmland before entering a wooded area, north of Ridgeway. A welcome center for northbound travelers is passed before the woodlands give way to a light urban setting. As the highway approaches the community of Inwood, a diamond interchange with West Virginia Route 51 (WV 51) provides access to the community, as well as Gerrardstown to the west of the freeway and Charles Town to the east. A small business park is passed by before I-81 intersects County Route 32 (CR 32), providing access to Arden, Eastern WV Regional Airport, and Tablers Station. The freeway turns more toward the north as it approaches Martinsburg, intersecting WV 45, CR 15 (King Street), and CR 13 (Dry Run Road) while in the city limits. I-81 bypasses downtown, running along the western border of town while US 11 continues through the town.

Just northeast of Martinsburg, the freeway passes under CSX Transportation's Cumberland Subdivision rail line while a cloverleaf interchange with WV 9 provides access back to Martinsburg and to Hedgesville. As the freeway curves back east, it intersects WV 901 between Hainesville and Falling Waters. WV 901 is a short connector route back to US 11. North of Falling Waters and south of Marlowe, US 11 intersects the freeway and continues north while I-81 turns east toward the Maryland state line at the Potomac River. Just south of the river is a welcome center intended for southbound travelers from Maryland.

Out of the six states that I-81 passes through, the segment in West Virginia is the second shortest, only longer than the Maryland segment. Every year, the West Virginia Department of Transportation (WVDOT) conducts a series of surveys on its highways in the state to measure traffic volume. This is expressed in terms of annual average daily traffic (AADT), which is a measure of traffic volume for any average day of the year. In 2009, WVDOT calculated that as few as 45,000 vehicles traveled along the highway at the Virginia state line and as many as 62,500 vehicles used the freeway between CR 15 and CR 13 in Martinsburg. As part of the Interstate Highway System, the entire route is listed on the National Highway System, a system of roads that are important to the nation's economy, defense, and mobility.

== History ==
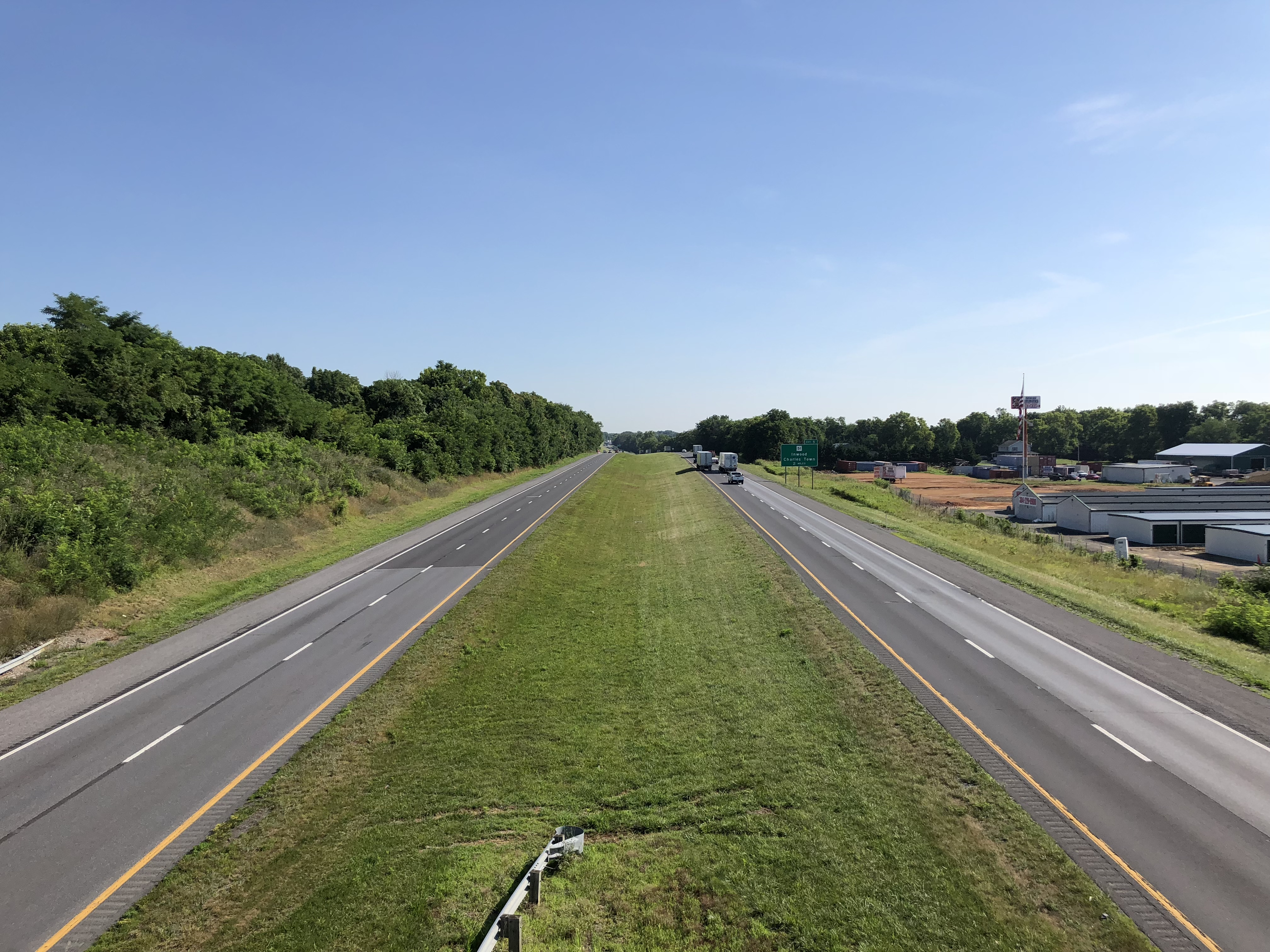
I-81 northbound in Bunker Hill

I-81 roughly parallels the Great Indian Warpath, an old Native American trail that connected New York to the Carolina Piedmont via Virginia and West Virginia. A series of roads linking Virginia to Maryland through Martinsburg were present on maps as early as 1873.

Bids for construction of I-81 by WVDOT were published in 1959, with a budget of about $10.6 million (equivalent to $87 million in 2024) to complete the highway. The three-mile (4.8 km) section between WV 901 and US 11 near Marlowe opened to traffic on May 31, 1961. Completion of I-81 in Virginia up to the West Virginia state line was completed by the Virginia Department of Transportation (VDOT) in November 1965. The first six miles (9.7 km) of the highway through West Virginia were completed between 1959 and 1963. The 4.5-mile (7.2 km) section between WV 9/45 and WV 9 opened on December 16, 1964, in a ceremony officiated by U.S. Senator Jennings Randolph. On June 30, 1966, the 4.97-mile (8.00 km) section between US 11 near Marlowe and US 11 in Williamsport, Maryland, was jointly opened to traffic and dedicated by Senator Randoph, former Maryland Governor William Preston Lane Jr., and Maryland State Senator George Snyder in a ceremony on the Potomac River bridges. The last section of I-81 in West Virginia, the 11-mile (18 km) section between the Virginia state line and WV 9/45, was dedicated and opened to traffic by Governor Hulett C. Smith and Senator Randolph on October 19, 1966. Since then, there have been no major realignments, and the highway continues on its original path.

In 2014, WVDOT officials announced, in conjunction with the Maryland State Highway Administration (MDOT SHA), that the bridges over the Potomac River would be rehabilitated and expanded to accommodate three lanes of highway in each direction. The project also included widening the section between US 11 and MD 63/68 to six lanes. Construction started in October 2016, and was completed on February 11, 2021.

== Exit list ==
The entire route is in Berkeley County.

Location	mi	km	Exit	Destinations	Notes
Ridgeway	0.0	0.0		I-81 south – Winchester, Roanoke	Continuation into Virginia
Inwood	5.0	8.0	5	WV 51 – Inwood, Charles Town	
Tablers Station	8.5	13.7	8	WV 243 (Tablers Station Road)	Access to Eastern WV Regional Airport
Martinsburg	11.7	18.8	12	WV 9 east (Winchester Avenue) / WV 45 – Charles Town	
Martinsburg	13.1	21.1	13	CR 15 (King Street)	
Martinsburg	14.2	22.9	14	CR 13 (Dry Run Road, Tennessee Avenue)	
Martinsburg	16.0	25.7	16	WV 9 (North Queen Street) – Berkeley Springs	Signed as exits 16E (south) and 16W (north); cloverleaf interchange
Spring Mills	20.4	32.8	20	WV 901 (Spring Mills Road)	
Marlowe	23.5	37.8	23	US 11 – Marlowe, Falling Waters	
Marlowe	26.0	41.8		I-81 north – Hagerstown	Continuation into Maryland
1.000 mi = 1.609 km; 1.000 km = 0.621 mi

== See also ==
Interstate 81
Previous state: Virginia	West Virginia	Next state: Maryland
