= West Virginia Route 51 =

State highway in West Virginia, United States

West Virginia Route 51

Route information
- Maintained by WVDOH
- Length: 18.2 mi (29.3 km)
- Tourist routes: Washington Heritage Trail

Major junctions
- West end: WV 45 / CR 20 near Gerrardstown
- I-81 in Inwood; US 11 in Inwood; WV 115 in Charles Town
- East end: US 340 / WV 9 in Charles Town

Location
- Country: United States
- State: West Virginia
- Counties: Berkeley, Jefferson

Highway system
- West Virginia State Highway System; Interstate; US; State
← US 50	→ US 52

West Virginia Route 51 (WV 51) is a state highway that runs west to east from Berkeley County to Jefferson County in West Virginia's Eastern Panhandle. The western terminus is at WV 45 northwest of Gerrardstown. The eastern terminus is at an interchange with U.S. Route 340 (US 340) and WV 9 east of downtown Charles Town. US 340 continues to the east on the same roadway as WV 51.

== Route description ==
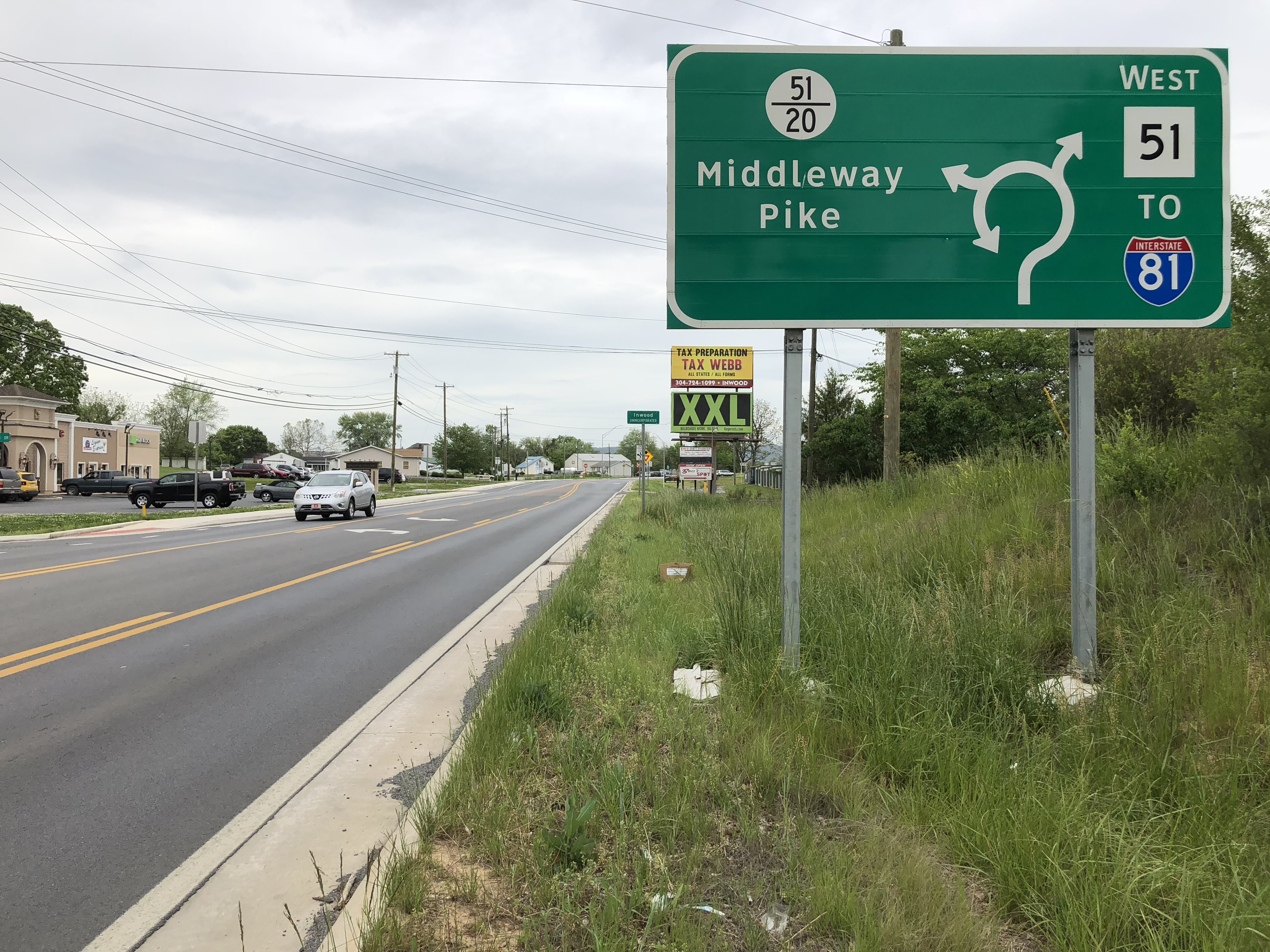
View west along WV 51 at CR 51/20 in Inwood

WV 51 begins at an intersection with WV 45 at Mills Gap on top of North Mountain in Berkeley County, where the road continues north as CR 20 (Buck Hill Road). From this intersection, WV 51 heads south as two-lane undivided Gerrardstown Road and descends the forested mountain. The road turns east-southeast at the base of the mountain and heads into the agricultural Shenandoah Valley. The route curves southeast and passes through the residential community of Gerrardstown. From here, WV 51 turns east and runs through a mix of farmland and woodland with some development. Farther east, the road heads into Inwood and turns northeast to reach a diamond interchange with I-81. Past this interchange, the route becomes a three-lane road with a center left-turn lane and passes businesses in the northern part of Inwood, crossing a Winchester and Western Railroad line. WV 51 comes to a roundabout with US 11 and heads southeast as the Inwood Bypass, reaching another roundabout before intersecting CR 51/20 (Middleway Pike) at a roundabout. At this point, the route heads southeast on two-lane undivided Middleway Pike and passes through a mix of residential and commercial areas. The road leaves Inwood and continues south-southeast through a mix of fields, woods, and development, curving to the southeast and passing through the community of Tarico Heights.

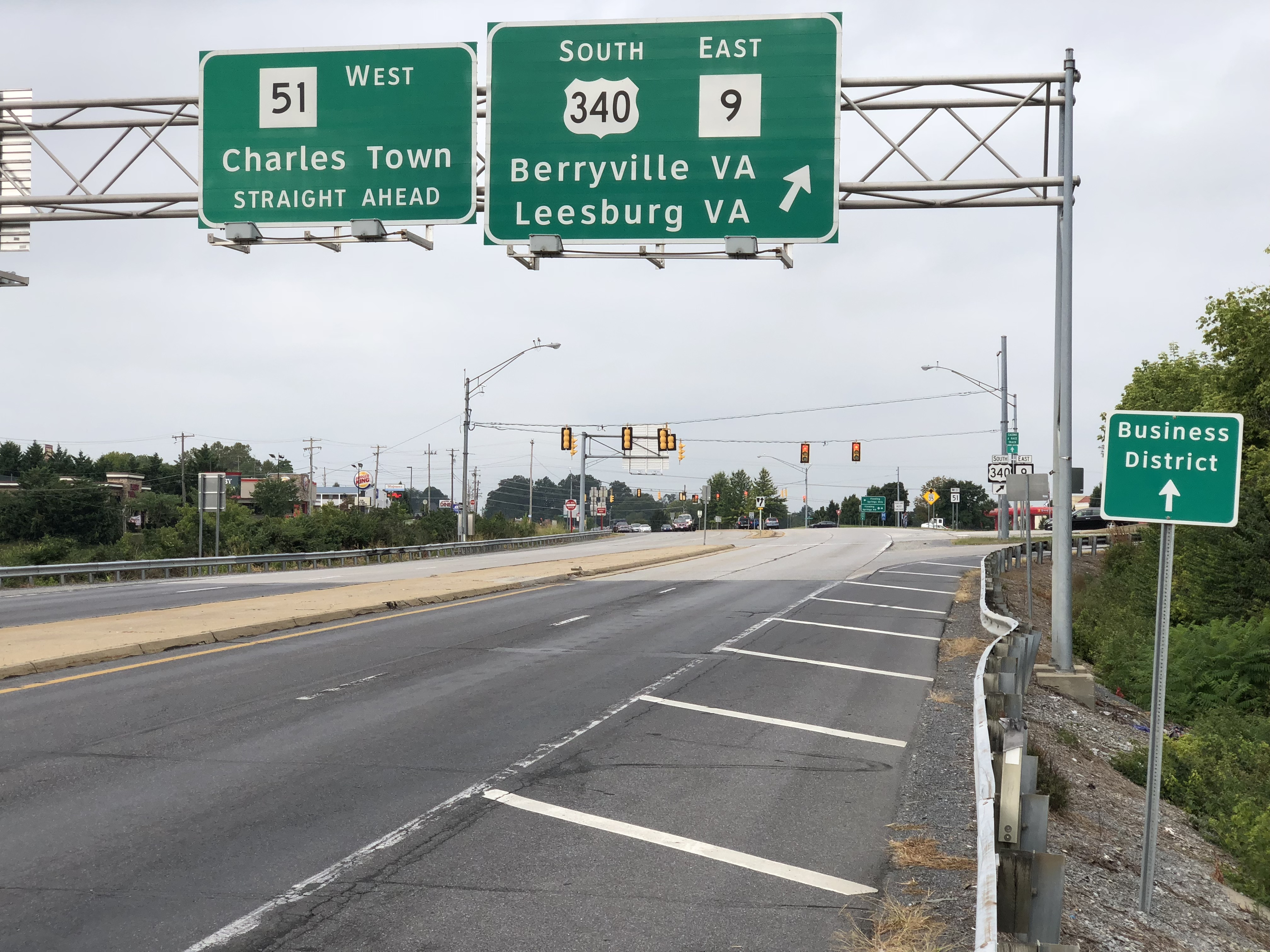
View west along WV 51 at US 340 and WV 9 in Charles Town

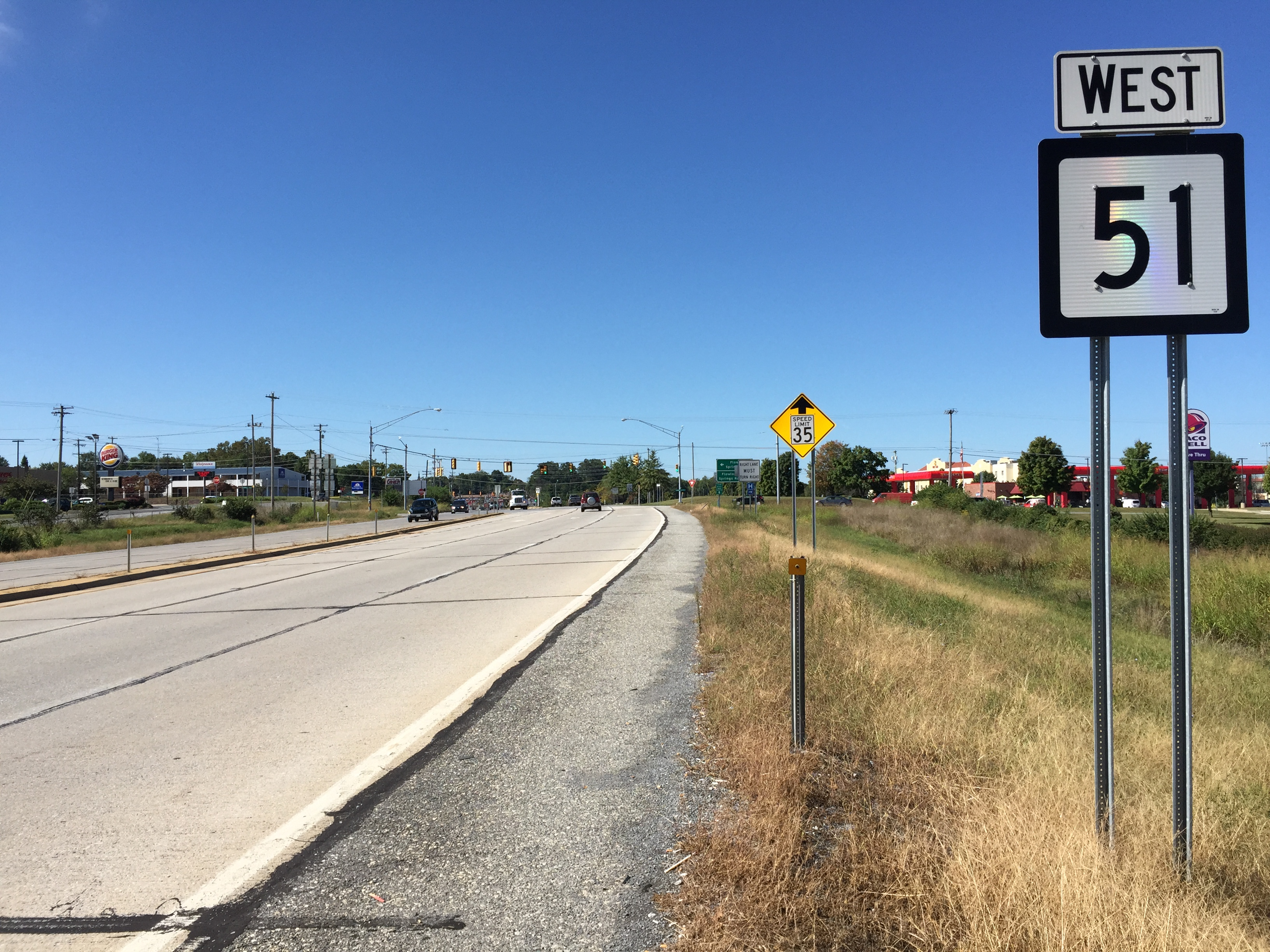
View west at the east end of WV 51 at US 340/WV 9 in Charles Town

WV 51 crosses Opequon Creek into Jefferson County and continues through a mix of farm fields and woods with some residential and commercial development, curving to the east as it passes north of the community of Middleway. The road continues east through rural land and passes the community of Aldridge and the historic house Harewood, making a turn to the east-southeast. The route crosses CSX's Shenandoah Subdivision railroad line and passes north of a residential development before running through more farmland. WV 51 crosses Norfolk Southern's Hagerstown District railroad line and enters the city of Charles Town, where the name becomes Martin Luther King Jr. Boulevard and the road passes homes. The route turns east-northeast onto West Washington Street and continues through residential areas of the city. WV 51 heads into the commercial downtown of Charles Town and comes to an intersection with WV 115 adjacent to the Jefferson County Courthouse, where the name changes to East Washington Street. From here, the road passes through more of the downtown before heading through residential neighborhoods. The route heads into business areas in the eastern part of Charles Town and gains a center left-turn lane. The road passes south of Hollywood Casino at Charles Town Races, where it widens into a four-lane divided highway. WV 51 comes to its eastern terminus at an interchange with US 340 and WV 9, at which point the road continues east as part of US 340.

== Major intersections ==
County	Location	mi	km	Destinations	Notes
Berkeley	Mills Gap			WV 45 (Apple Harvest Drive) / CR 20 (Buck Hill Road) – Glengary, Martinsburg	Western terminus
Berkeley				I-81 – Martinsburg, Winchester, VA	I-81 exit 5
Berkeley	Inwood			US 11 (Winchester Avenue) – Martinsburg, Winchester, VA	Roundabout
Jefferson	Charles Town			WV 115 (George Street)	
Jefferson				US 340 / WV 9 – Harpers Ferry, Martinsburg, Berryville, VA, Leesburg, VA	interchange; eastern terminus
1.000 mi = 1.609 km; 1.000 km = 0.621 mi
