= West Virginia Route 45 =

State highway in West Virginia, United States

West Virginia Route 45

Route information
- Maintained by WVDOH
- Length: 25.8 mi (41.5 km)

Major junctions
- West end: SR 681 near Glengary
- WV 51 / CR 20 near Gerrardstown; I-81 in Martinsburg; US 11 in Martinsburg; WV 9 in Martinsburg
- East end: WV 230 / WV 480 in Shepherdstown

Location
- Country: United States
- State: West Virginia
- Counties: Berkeley, Jefferson

Highway system
- West Virginia State Highway System; Interstate; US; State
← WV 44	→ WV 46

West Virginia Route 45 (WV 45) is a state highway in the U.S. state of West Virginia. The state highway runs 25.8 miles (41.5 km) from the Virginia state line near Glengary east to WV 230 and WV 480 in Shepherdstown. WV 45 connects the communities of Glengary and Arden in southwestern Berkeley County with the county seat of Martinsburg. The state highway also connects Shepherdstown in northern Jefferson County with Martinsburg, where the highway meets Interstate 81 (I-81), U.S. Route 11 (US 11), and WV 9.

== Route description ==
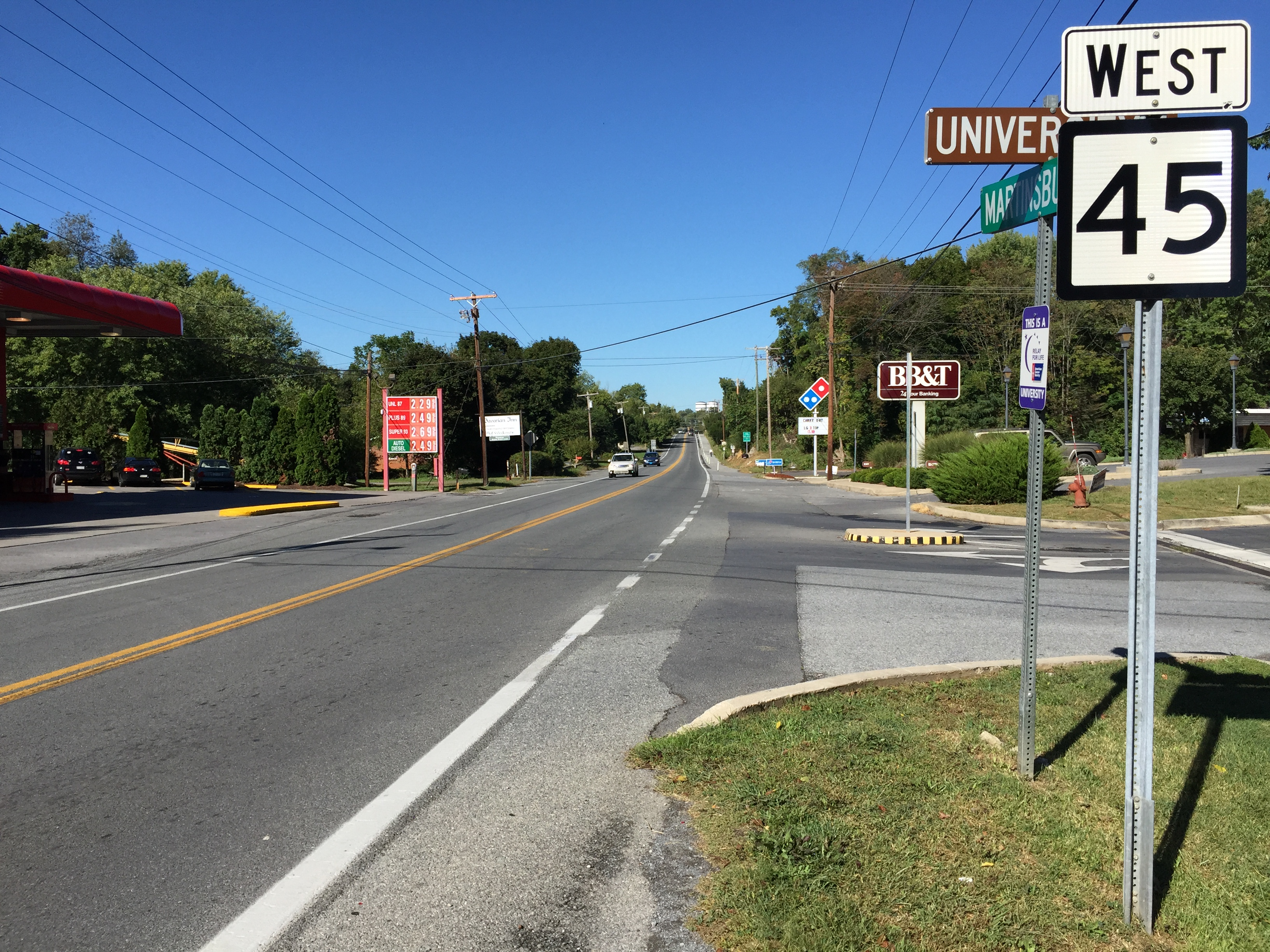
View west along WV 45 in Shepherdstown

WV 45 begins at the Virginia state line in the southwestern corner of Berkeley County. The roadway continues across the state line as SR 681 (Glengary Road) in Frederick County, Virginia. WV 45 heads north and then east through a mix of forest and farmland in a valley east of Sleepy Creek Mountain. East of the village of Glengary, the state highway crosses Back Creek then veers northeast to ascend North Mountain. WV 45 intersects WV 51 (Gerrardstown Road) at Mills Gap at the top of the mountain. WV 45 descends into the Shenandoah Valley, passing the community of Union Corner and the historic homes Campbellton and Ar-Qua Springs. In the village of Arden, WV 45 turns east onto Greenhouse Road, south onto Arden Nollville Road, then northeast from the second road to head toward Martinsburg.

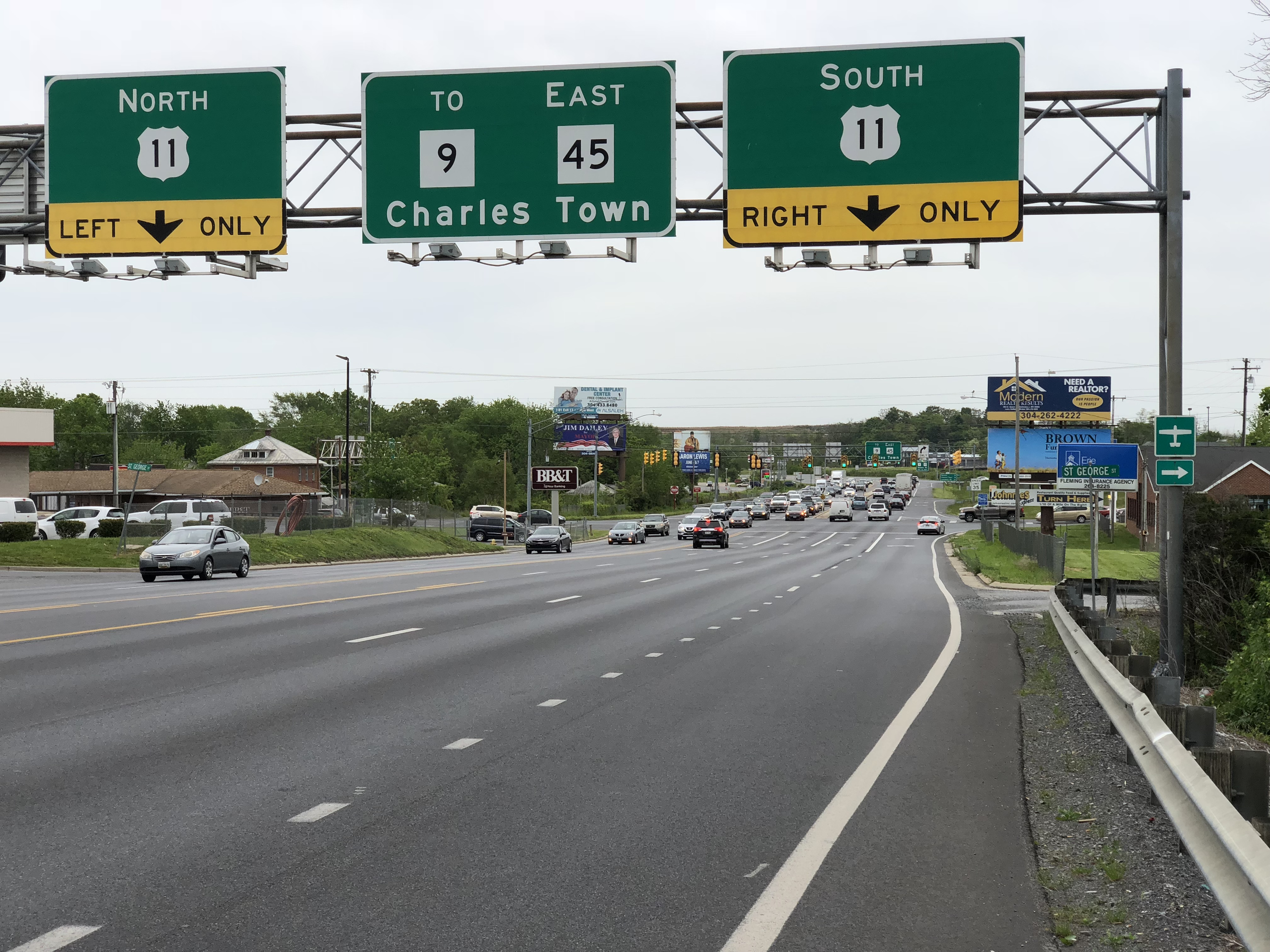
View east along WV 45 near US 11 in Martinsburg

WV 45 intersects I-81 at a diamond interchange and continues east as Apple Harvest Drive, a four-lane undivided highway that passes through a commercial area south of the city limits of Martinsburg where the highway meets a Winchester and Western Railroad line at grade and intersects US 11 (Winchester Avenue). East of the commercial area, WV 45 has a folded diamond interchange with Queen Street, which crosses over the highway. The roadway continues east as WV 9 (Charles Town Road); WV 45 and WV 9 run concurrently north on two-lane Queen Street. The two highways head north through the Boydville Historic District toward downtown Martinsburg, where Queen Street intersects King Street, which carries US 11 west. US 11 joins the two state-numbered highways on Queen Street past the Apollo Theatre and near the Martinsburg station, which serves Amtrak's Capitol Limited and is the western terminus of MARC's Brunswick Line. Queen Street traverses Tuscarora Creek, passes under CSX's Cumberland Subdivision, and passes through the Baltimore and Ohio and Related Industries Historic District.

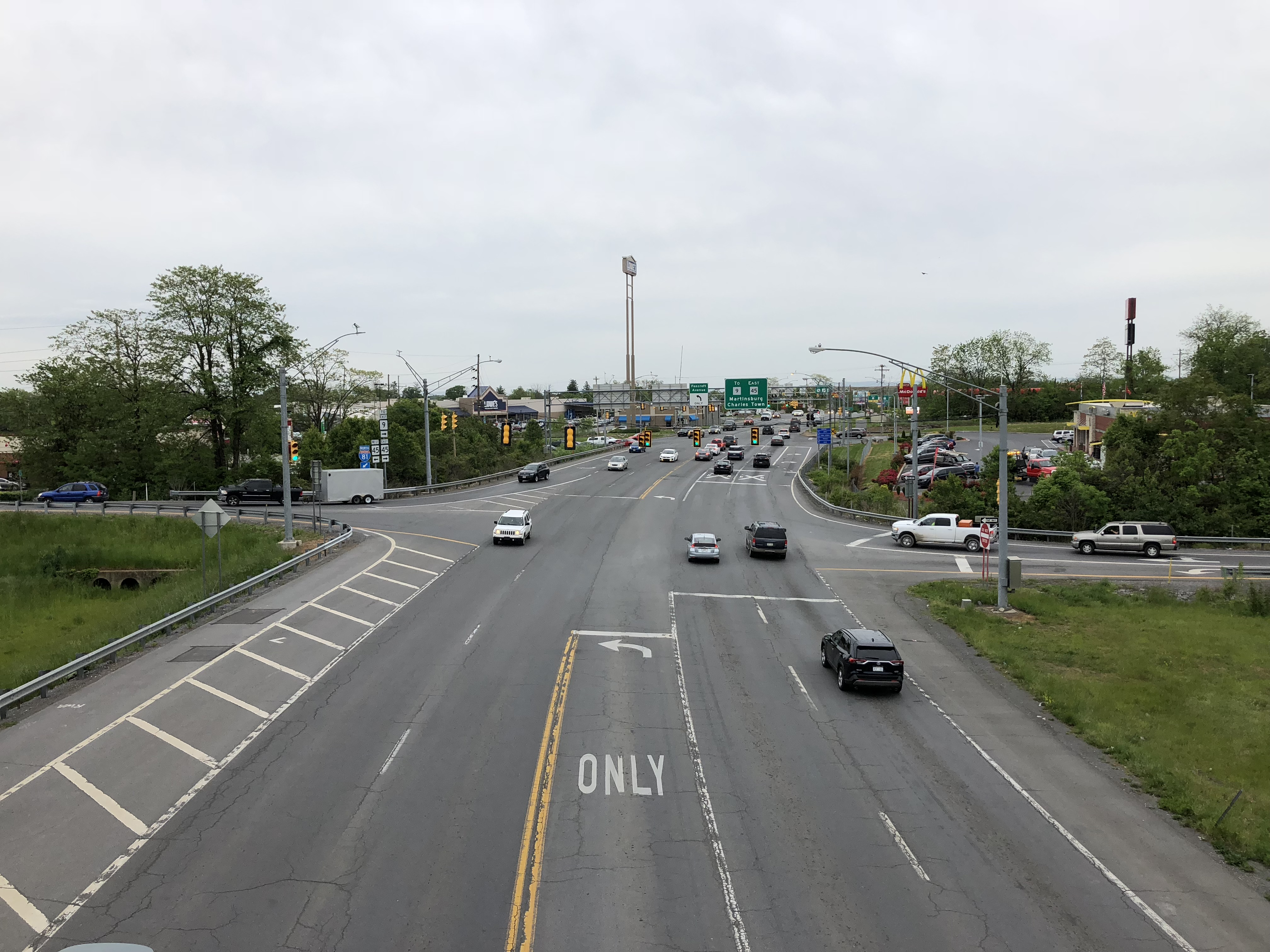
View east along WV 45 from I-81 near Martinsburg

WV 45 leaves the concurrency with US 11 and WV 9 at East Moler Avenue, where the highway heads east out of Martinsburg as Martinsburg Parkway, a two-lane road that crosses Opequon Creek and passes through a mix of forest and farmland. The state highway passes through the hamlet of Files Crossroad and enters Jefferson County at Rockymarsh Run just north of Wynkoop Spring. WV 45 passes through the community of Mechlenburg Heights before entering the town of Shepherdstown as German Street. The state highway reaches its eastern terminus at an intersection with WV 480 (Duke Street) in the center of the town. German Street continues east as WV 230, which turns south toward Halltown.

== Major intersections ==
County	Location	mi	km	Destinations	Notes
Berkeley		0.0	0.0	SR 681 (Glengary Road)	Virginia state line; western terminus
Berkeley	Mills Gap	6.2	10.0	WV 51 east (Gerrardstown Road) / CR 20 (Buck Hill Road) – Inwood	
Berkeley	Arden	10.6	17.1	CR 30 north (Arden Nollville Road)	west end of CR 30 overlap
Berkeley	Arden	10.7	17.2	CR 30 south (Arden Nollville Road)	east end of CR 30 overlap
Berkeley	Martinsburg	14.4	23.2	I-81 – Hagerstown, Winchester, Roanoke	I-81 exit 12
Berkeley		14.8	23.8	US 11 (Winchester Avenue)	
Berkeley		15.4	24.8	WV 9 east – Charles Town	Interchange; west end of concurrency with WV 9
Berkeley	Martinsburg	16.6	26.7	US 11 south (King Street) to I-81	West end of concurrency with US 11
Berkeley	Martinsburg	17.5	28.2	US 11 north / WV 9 west (Queen Street) to I-81	east end of concurrency with US 11 and WV 9
Jefferson				WV 45 Alt. south (Potomac Farms Drive) – Kearneysville, truck to WV 480	
Jefferson	Shepherdstown	25.8	41.5	WV 230 south (German Street) / WV 480 (Duke Street) – Harpers Ferry, Sharpsburg, Kearneysville	Eastern terminus
1.000 mi = 1.609 km; 1.000 km = 0.621 mi: Concurrency terminus

== WV 45 Alternate ==
West Virginia Route 45 Alternate
- Location: Southwest of Shepherdstown

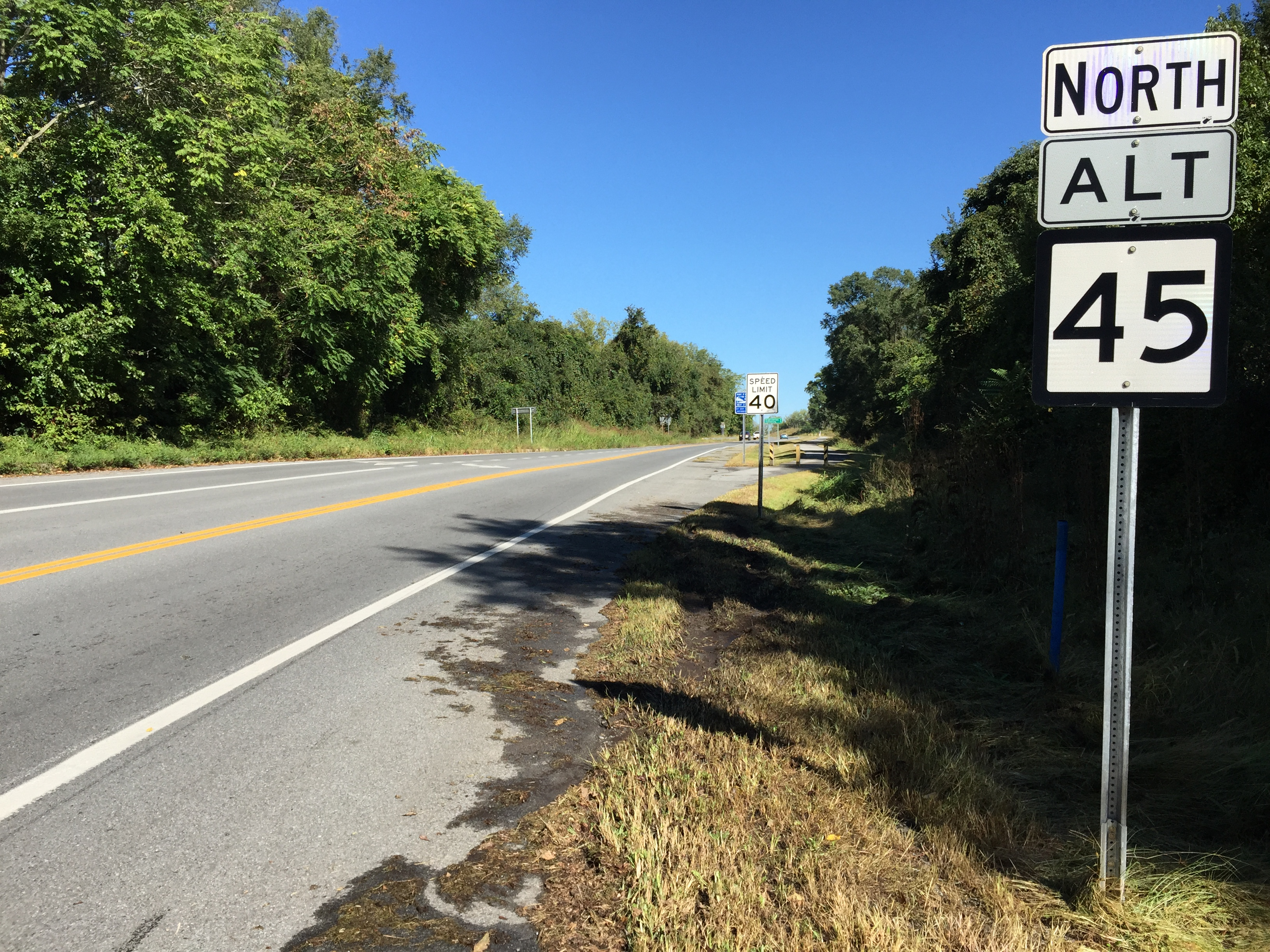
View north along WV 45 Alt. at WV 480 in Morgan Grove

West Virginia Route 45 Alternate runs southeast from the WV 45 at the east end of Old Martinsburg Road (CR 12/1) along Potomac Farms Drive to West Virginia Route 480 across from the intersection with Morgan Grove Road (CR 16/5) west of Shepherdstown.
