= West Virginia Route 901 =

State highway in West Virginia, United States

West Virginia Route 901

Route information
- Maintained by WVDOH
- Length: 5.65 mi (9.09 km)

Major junctions
- West end: WV 9 in Hedgesville
- I-81 near Falling Waters
- East end: US 11 in Falling Waters

Location
- Country: United States
- State: West Virginia
- Counties: Berkeley

Highway system
- West Virginia State Highway System; Interstate; US; State
| ← WV 892 | → WV 956 |

West Virginia Route 901 is an east–west state highway in West Virginia's Eastern Panhandle. The route, located entirely in Berkeley County, serves as a connector route between West Virginia Route 9 and U.S. Route 11. The western terminus of WV 901 is at WV 9 in Hedgesville. The eastern terminus is at US 11 south of Falling Waters.

WV 901 was formerly County Route 3.

== Route description ==
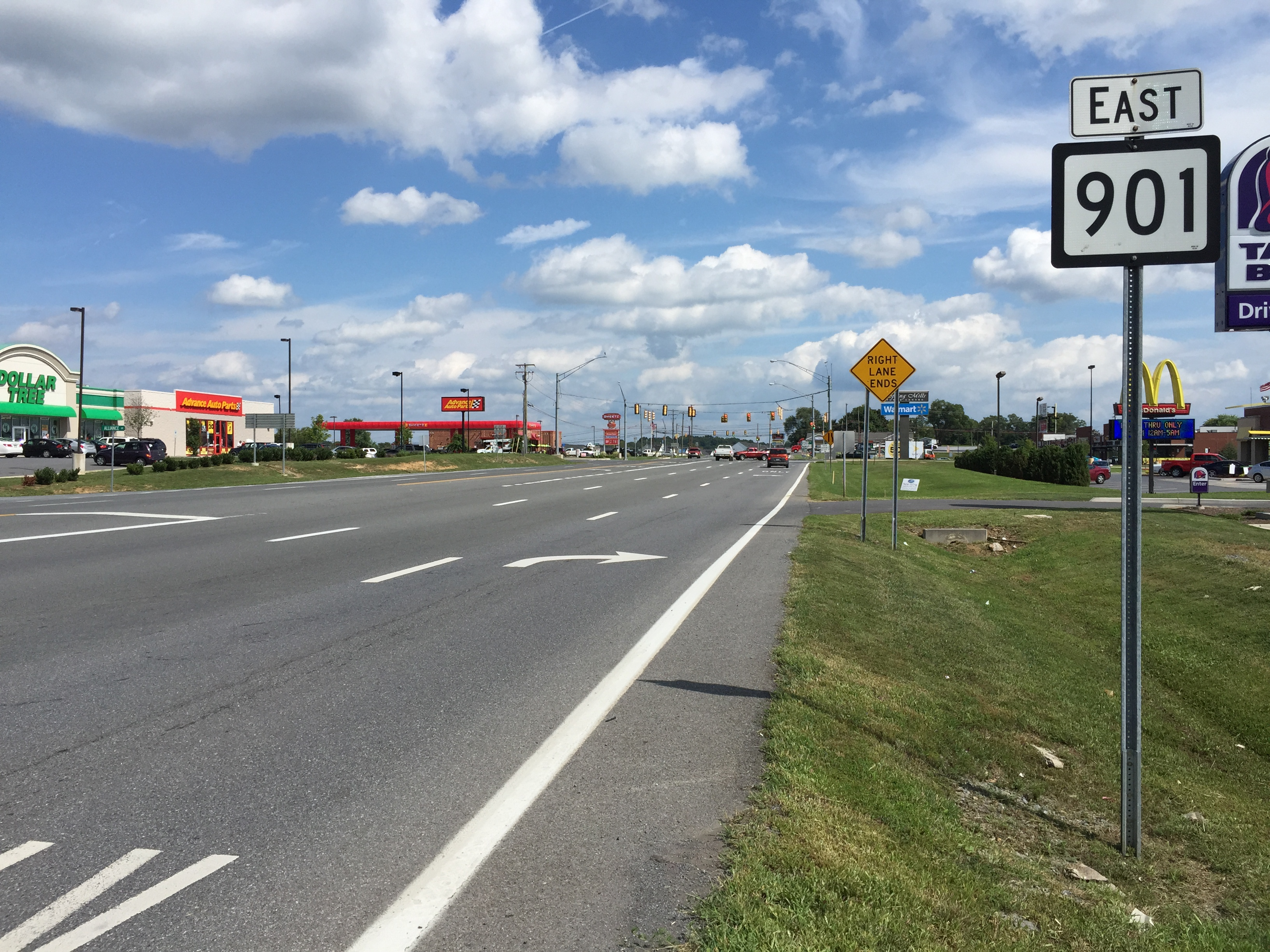
View east along WV 901 at I-81 near Falling Waters

In the Town of Hedgesville, WV 901 is named North Mary Street. Between Hedgesville and Falling Waters, WV 901 is named Hammonds Mill Road. WV 901 heads northeast out of Hedgesville towards Falling Waters. WV 901 turns southeast passing through Spring Mills. Then WV 901 enters Falling Waters having an interchange with Interstate 81. After I–81, WV 901 eastern terminus is at an intersection with US 11.

In 2014, the road was ceremonially renamed the Deputy John L. Burkett III Memorial Highway in honor of a Berkeley County sheriff's deputy who was killed in the line of duty in 2001.

== Major intersections ==
The entire route is in Berkeley County.

| Location | mi | km | Destinations | Notes |
|---|---|---|---|---|
| Hedgesville | 0.00 | 0.00 | WV 9 (Main Street) | Western terminus of WV 901 |
| Falling Waters | 5.33 | 8.58 | I-81 – Hagerstown, Martinsburg | Exit 20 (I-81) |
| Falling Waters | 5.65 | 9.09 | US 11 – Hagerstown, Martinsburg | Eastern terminus of WV 901 |
1.000 mi = 1.609 km; 1.000 km = 0.621 mi
