= U.S. Route 11 in West Virginia =

Segment of American highway

U.S. Route 11
- US 11 highlighted in red

Route information
- Maintained by WVDOH
- Length: 26.16 mi (42.10 km)
- Existed: Fall 1925–present

Major junctions
- South end: US 11 at the Virginia state line in Ridgeway
- WV 51 in Inwood; WV 45 in Martinsburg; WV 9 in Martinsburg; I-81 near Marlowe
- North end: US 11 at the Maryland state line in Marlowe

Location
- Country: United States
- State: West Virginia
- Counties: Berkeley

Highway system
- United States Numbered Highway System; List; Special; Divided; West Virginia State Highway System; Interstate; US; State
| ← WV 10 | → WV 12 |

U.S. Route 11 (US 11) in the U.S. state of West Virginia spans 26.16 miles (42.10 km) across the Eastern Panhandle region. US 11 enters the state near Ridgeway and crosses into Maryland just south of Williamsport. The highway closely parallels Interstate 81 (I-81) for its entire length.

== Route description ==
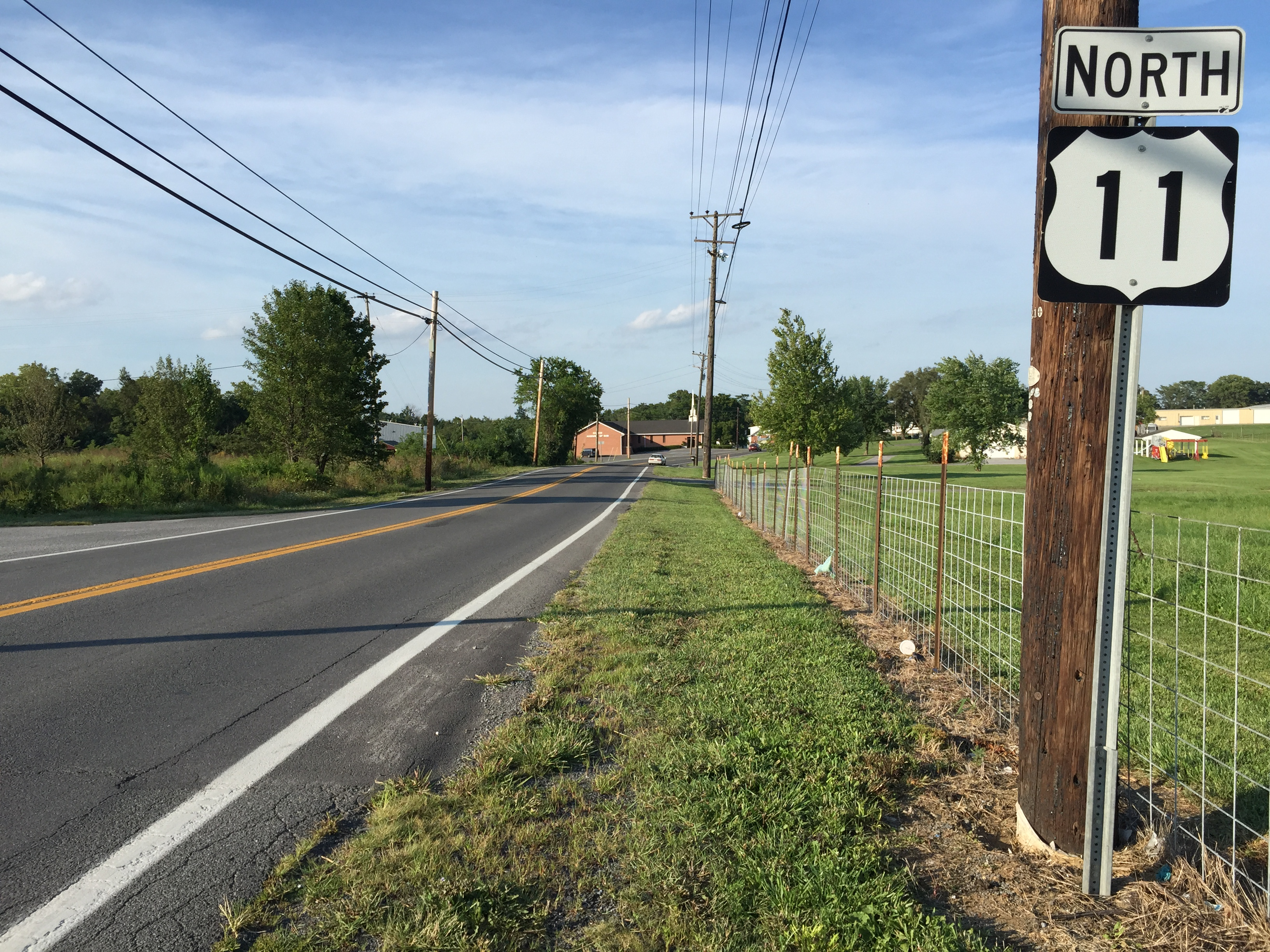
View north along US 11 in Inwood

US 11 begins as an extension of US 11 in Virginia, crossing the state line just north of Rest. The highway travels northwest through a light residential setting in the community of Ridgeway. After leaving Ridgeway, US 11, named Winchester Avenue, passes through light woodlands before they give way to the community of Bunker Hill. The highway, now named the Winchester Pike, serves as the main north–south highway through the town. Several small business and residences line the highway as it leaves Bunker Hill. As the highway continues north, it passes between several sports stadiums before entering urbanized Inwood. In Inwood, US 11 comes to a roundabout with West Virginia Route 51 (WV 51). As with the community of Ridgeway and Bunker Hill, US 11 serves as the main north–south road through the town.

The intersection of County Route 32 (CR 32) and the Winchester Pike forms the southwestern corner of Eastern WV Regional Airport, which the pike passes to the west of as it approaches the community of Pikeside and an intersection with CR 19. The name of the road changes back to Winchester Avenue as it heads north into the city of Martinsburg, intersecting WV 45 before the highway turns east onto West King Street. US 11 heads east for several blocks along King Street before turning north along Queen Street, concurrent with WV 9 and WV 45. The three highways pass just west of Martinsburg station, which services both Amtrak's Capitol Limited and MARC Train's Brunswick Line, before passing under CSX Transportation's Cumberland Subdivision. An intersection with East Moler Avenue carries WV 45 east, while another interchange in the northern outskirts of the city carries WV 9 north toward a cloverleaf interchange with I-81 as US 11 turns northeast.

US 11 continues north through the communities of Bessemer and Hainesville, where the highway meets CR 5, before approaching an intersection with WV 901, which serves as a short connector route to I-81. After passing through the community of Falling Waters on the western banks of the Potomac River, the highway turns more towards the north and has its only grade-separated interchange, a diamond interchange with I-81. After crossing over the freeway, a left intersection with CR 1 provides access to Little Georgetown to the west as the pike passes through the community of Marlowe. US 11 in West Virginia ends at the southwestern bank of the Potomac River; however, the roadway continues north as US 11 in Maryland. In contrast to I-81, no part of US 11 is listed on the National Highway System, a system of roads that are important to the nation's economy, defense, and mobility.

== History ==
The highway roughly parallels the Warrior Path, an old Indian trail which connected New York to the Piedmont via Virginia and West Virginia. A series of roads linking Virginia to Maryland through Martinsburg were present on maps as early as 1873.

US 11 is one of the original six highways that were part of the U.S. Numbered Highway System in the state, the others being US 19, US 21, US 40, US 50, and US 60.

The oldest bridge still in use on the highway is the bridge over Middle Creek, about 0.02 miles (32 m) north of the interchange with CR 11/8 in Martinsburg. The overpass carrying the railroad tracks in Martinsburg was originally constructed in 1976.

== Major intersections ==
The entire route is in Berkeley County.

| Location | mi | km | Destinations | Notes |
|---|---|---|---|---|
| Ridgeway | 0.0 | 0.0 | US 11 south (Martinsburg Pike) – Winchester | Virginia state line |
| Bunker Hill | 3.1 | 5.0 | CR 26 (Runnymeade Road / Giles Mill Road) | |
| Inwood | 5.1 | 8.2 | WV 51 (Inwood Bypass) to I-81 – Charles Town, Harpers Ferry | Roundabout |
| Tablers Station | 8.3 | 13.4 | CR 81/8 (Business Park Drive) / CR 11/30 (Novak Drive) to I-81 – Rockefeller Science & Technology Center, Procter & Gamble, Airport | |
| Pikeside | 9.9 | 15.9 | CR 19 (Paynes Ford Road) – Armory, Airport | |
| Martinsburg | 11.6 | 18.7 | WV 45 to I-81 / WV 9 – Charles Town | |
| Martinsburg | 13.3 | 21.4 | WV 9 east / WV 45 west (South Queen Street) | Southern end of WV 9 and WV 45 concurrencies |
| Martinsburg | 14.2 | 22.9 | WV 45 east (Moler Avenue) – Shepherdstown | Northern end of WV 45 concurrency |
| Martinsburg | 14.8 | 23.8 | WV 9 west to I-81 / Raleigh Street – Berkeley Springs | Northern end of WV 9 concurrency |
| Hainesville | 18.9 | 30.4 | CR 5 (Bedington Road) / CR 8 (Nipetown Road) | |
| Berkeley | 20.4 | 32.8 | WV 901 west to I-81 – Hedgesville | |
| Berkeley | 23.4 | 37.7 | I-81 – Martinsburg, Hagerstown | I-81 exit 23 |
| Spring Mills | 23.7 | 38.1 | CR 1 (Grade Road) | |
| Marlowe | 26.16 | 42.10 | US 11 north (Potomac Street) – Williamsport | Maryland state line (Route 11 Bridge over Potomac River) |
1.000 mi = 1.609 km; 1.000 km = 0.621 mi: Concurrency terminus

== See also ==
U.S. Route 11
| Previous state: Virginia | West Virginia | Next state: Maryland |
