= West Virginia Route 9 =

State highway in West Virginia, United States

West Virginia Route 9

Route information
- Maintained by WVDOH
- Length: 74.0 mi (119.1 km)
- Tourist routes: Washington Heritage Trail

Major junctions
- West end: MD 51 in Paw Paw
- WV 29 near Pin Oak; US 522 in Berkeley Springs; I-81 near Martinsburg; US 11 near Martinsburg; WV 45 in Martinsburg; WV 480 in Kearneysville; US 340 in Charles Town
- East end: SR 9 near Keyes Gap

Location
- Country: United States
- State: West Virginia
- Counties: Morgan, Hampshire, Berkeley, Jefferson

Highway system
- West Virginia State Highway System; Interstate; US; State
← WV 8	→ WV 10

West Virginia Route 9 (WV 9) is a major east–west state highway located in the eastern extents of West Virginia's Eastern Panhandle. The western terminus of the route is at the Maryland state line on the north edge of Paw Paw, where WV 9 becomes Maryland Route 51 (MD 51) upon crossing the Potomac River. The eastern terminus is at the Virginia state line at Keyes Gap near Mannings, West Virginia, where WV 9 continues onward as Virginia State Route 9 (SR 9).

With no east–west US Highway in the region, WV 9 acts as the major east–west transportation artery between Morgan, Berkeley, and Jefferson counties. WV 9 briefly enters Hampshire County where it intersects with WV 29 near Pin Oak.

== History ==
=== Construction ===
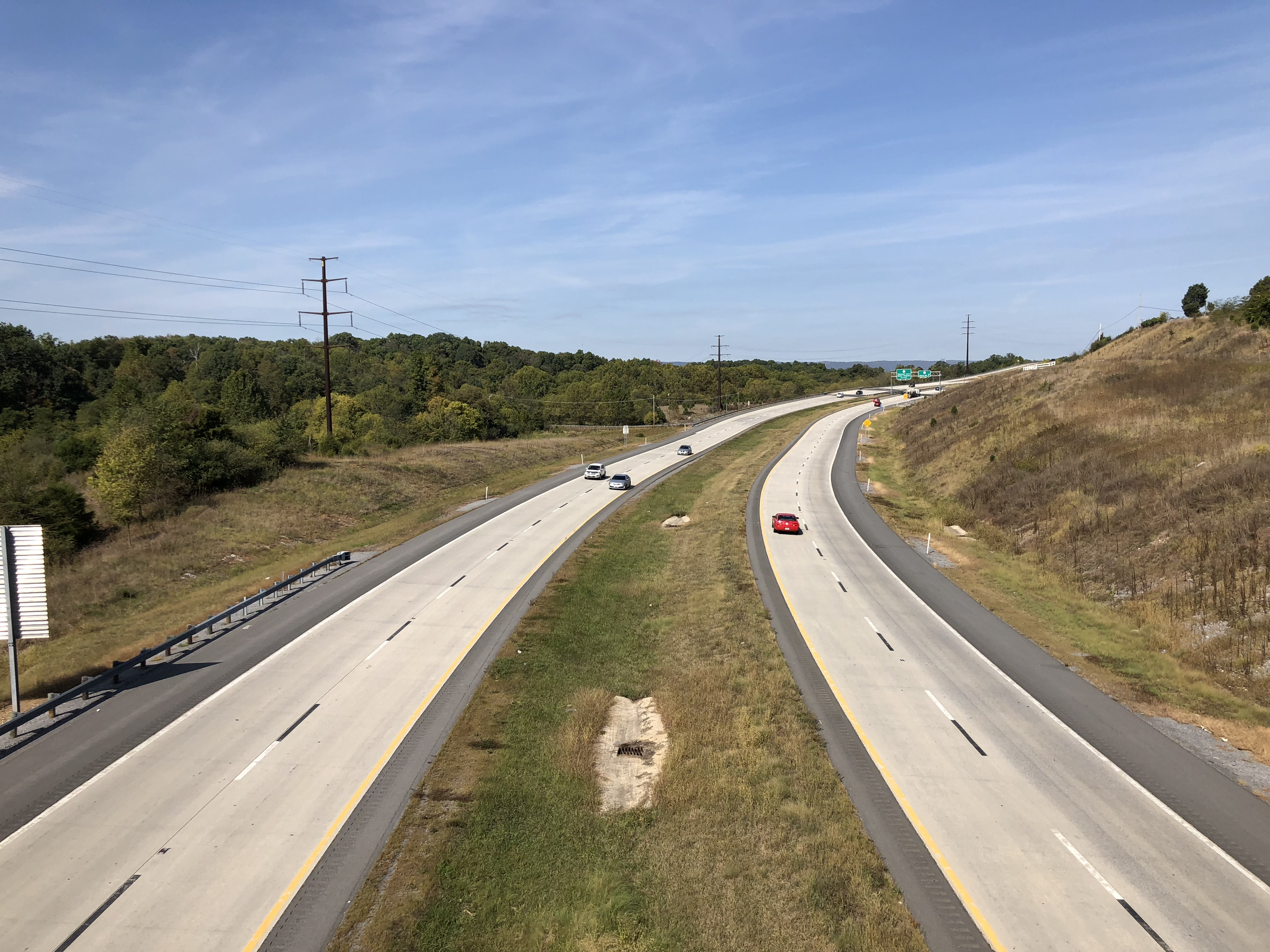
View west along WV 9 southeast of Martinsburg in Berkeley County

U.S. Senator Robert C. Byrd began securing funding for the projects in the early 1990s. Shortly thereafter, a short portion of the road along the southern edge of Martinsburg was widened to four lanes, from Queen Street to Kelly Island Road. In the mid-2000s, a short stretch was also widened to four lanes from Interstate 81 (I-81) west to Harlan Springs Road.

The next significant project did not take place until September 2007, when a four-mile (6.4 km) stretch of the road opened up from Charles Town, through Bardane to Leetown Road in Kearneysville.

In early 2008, the future west-bound lanes of traffic were opened to two-way traffic from Kelly Island Road to, and over, Opequon Creek. This allowed for the former road surface to be pulled up and the eastbound lanes to be built. It also allowed for the demolition of the old bridge over the Opequon, which had been the site of several fatal accidents.

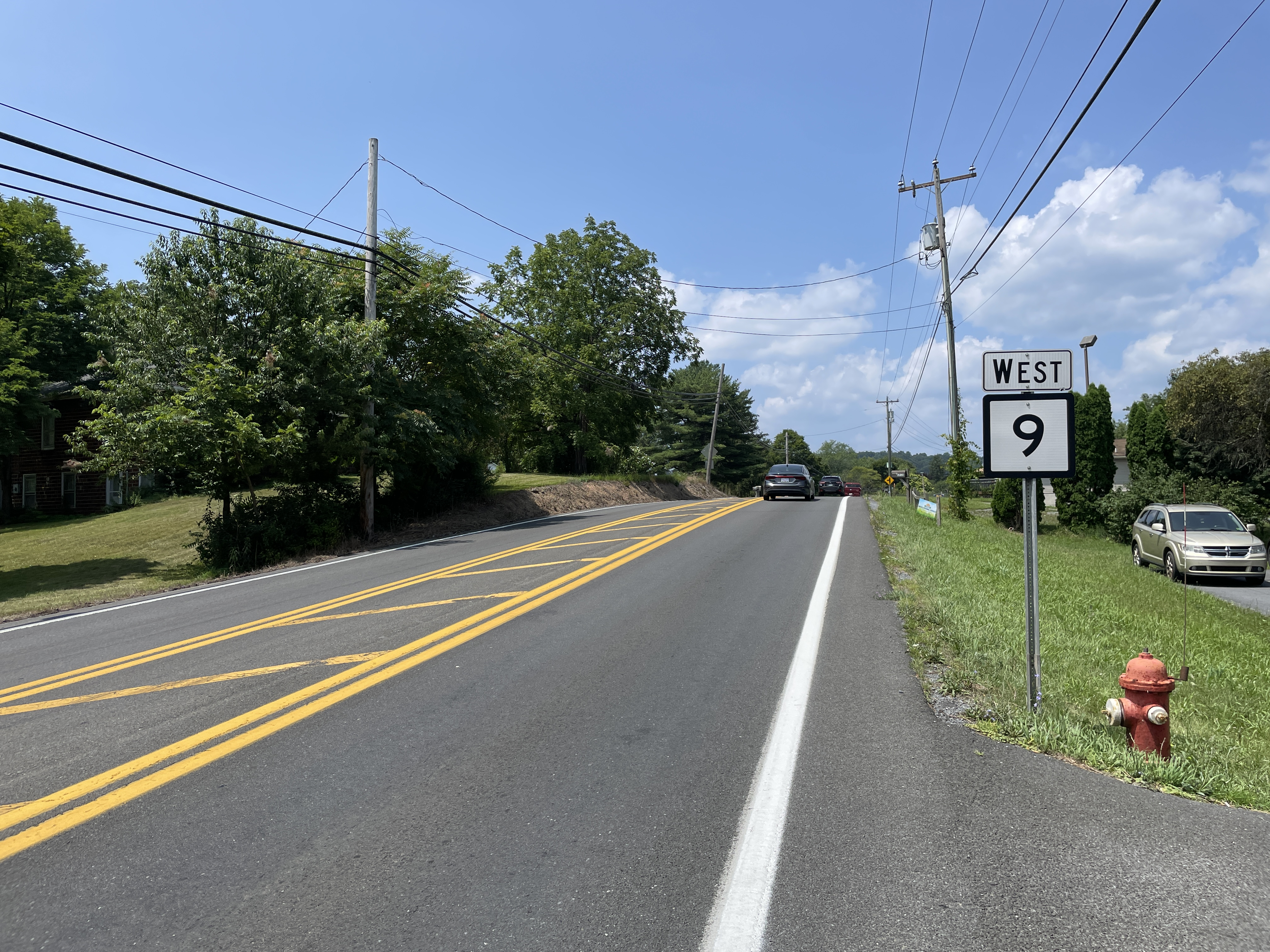
WV 9 westbound past CR 7 near Hedgesville

In April 2009, a short 1.3-mile (2.1 km) section of the new WV 9 was opened from the Eastern Regional Jail to the Opequon Creek bridge. A four-mile (6.4 km) section of WV 9 from the Eastern Regional Jail to Short Road was completed at the end of 2009. Construction from Short Road to Leetown Road was completed in August 2010.

The stretch from the Virginia line to Charles Town was the most recent stage of construction. A pair of new bridges span U.S. Route 340 (US 340) south of Charles Town. The bypass carries WV 9 away from its previous winding route across the Shenandoah River and the Blue Ridge. Instead, it follows a straight path near Cattail Run Road, connecting with Virginia Route 9 at Keyes Gap.

Despite opposition from some Virginia residents, who were concerned about increasing traffic along the narrow, winding stretch of SR 9 through the town of Hillsboro, this stretch of road opened to traffic on November 14, 2012.

=== Naming dedication ===
In April 2008, a section of the road, which passes by his Gap View Farm home, was named and dedicated in Frank Buckles's honor by then-West Virginia Governor Joe Manchin.

== Major intersections ==
County	Location	mi	km	Destinations	Notes
Morgan	Paw Paw	0.0	0.0	MD 51 north (Oldtown Road) – Cumberland	Maryland state line
Hampshire				WV 29 south to US 50	Northern terminus of WV 29
Morgan	Berkeley Springs			US 522 north (Washington Street) – Hancock, MD	West end of US 522 concurrency
Morgan	Berkeley Springs			US 522 south (Washington Street) – Winchester, VA	East end of US 522 concurrency
Berkeley	Hedgesville			WV 901 east (Mary Street) – Spring Mills	Western terminus of WV 901
Berkeley				I-81 – Hagerstown, Winchester	I-81 exit 16
Berkeley	Martinsburg			US 11 north / Raleigh Street – Williamsport, MD	West end of US 11 concurrency
Berkeley	Martinsburg			WV 45 east (Moler Avenue) – Shepherdstown	West end of WV 45 concurrency
Berkeley	Martinsburg			US 11 south (King Street) to I-81	East end of US 11 concurrency
Berkeley				WV 45 west to I-81 – Glengary	East end of WV 45 concurrency; interchange
Berkeley				CR 9/17 (Opequon Lane) – Baker Heights	interchange
Berkeley		56.8	91.4	CR 9/19 (Short Road)	interchange
Jefferson		59.2	95.3	CR 1 to WV 480 – Kearneysville, Shepherdstown, Leetown	interchange
Jefferson	Ranson	61.2	98.5	CR 8 (Wiltshire Road) – Bardane	interchange
Jefferson	Ranson	63.4	102.0	WV 115 / CR 9/1 (Currie Road) – Ranson	interchange
Jefferson	Ranson	65.8	105.9	CR 17 (Flowing Springs Road)	interchange
Jefferson		66.2	106.5	US 340 north / WV 51 west – Charles Town, Harpers Ferry	Interchange; west end of US 340 concurrency
Jefferson		67.4	108.5	US 340 south – Berryville, VA	Interchange; east end of US 340 concurrency
Jefferson				WV 115 west (Charles Town Road) / CR 32 (Chestnut Hill Road)	
Jefferson		74.0	119.1	SR 9 east (Charles Town Pike) – Leesburg	Virginia state line
1.000 mi = 1.609 km; 1.000 km = 0.621 mi: Concurrency terminus
