= Washington Heritage Trail =

National Scenic Byway in West Virginia

Washington Heritage Trail

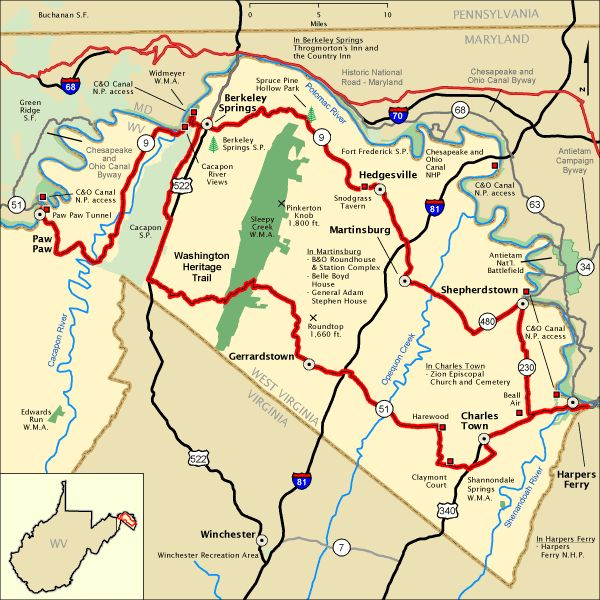

Route information
- Maintained by WVDOH
- Length: 136.0 mi (218.9 km)
- Existed: June 15, 2000 –present

Major junctions
- West end: WV 9 in Paw Paw
- US 522 in Berkeley Springs
- East end: US 340 in Harpers Ferry

Location
- Country: United States
- State: West Virginia
- Counties: Berkeley, Jefferson, Morgan

Highway system
- Scenic Byways; National; National Forest; BLM; NPS; West Virginia State Highway System; Interstate; US; State

The Washington Heritage Trail is a 136.0-mile (218.9 km) National Scenic Byway through the easternmost counties of West Virginia's Eastern Panhandle. The trail forms a loop through the three counties and traces the footsteps of George Washington and the marks his family left in the Eastern Panhandle. In addition to homes and sites related to the Washingtons, the Washington Heritage Trail includes various museums, historic districts, parks, and other sites of historic significance in the area.

== Route description ==
The Washington Heritage Trail runs through Berkeley, Jefferson, and Morgan counties in the Eastern Panhandle of West Virginia. The western end is near Paw Paw where the trail follows West Virginia Route 9 (WV 9) east to Berkeley Springs. There, the trail splits into two branches. The southern branch follows U.S. Route 522 (US 522) and WV 51, and US 340 while the northern branch continues along WV 9, WV 480 and WV 230. The two branches rejoin west of Harpers Ferry and continue to the eastern end of the byway in that city.

== History ==
The trail was named a National Scenic Byway on June 15, 2000. It is a West Virginia State Scenic Byway as well.
