= Pikeside, West Virginia =

Pikeside
- Unincorporated community
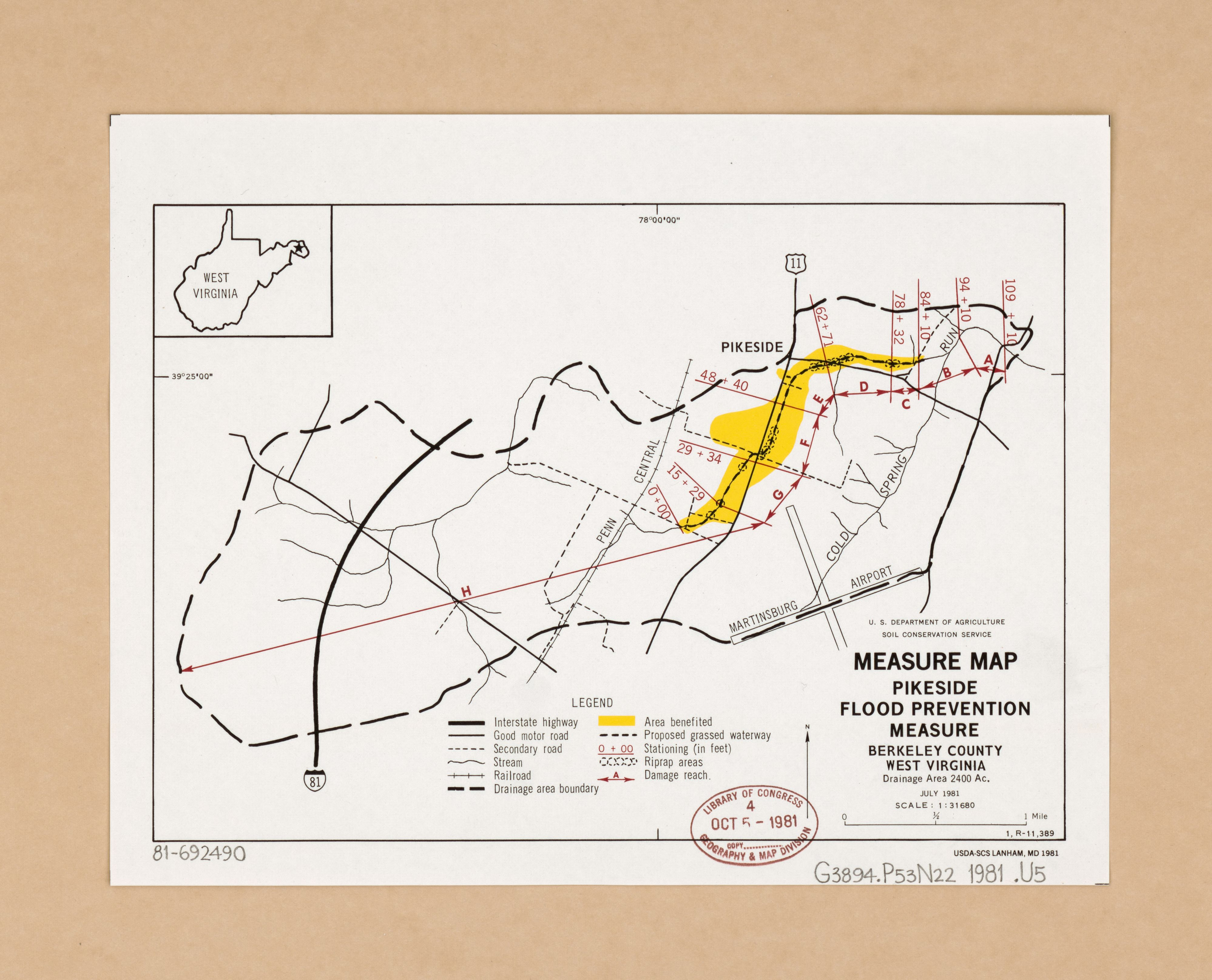
- 1981 flood prevention map of Pikeside

- Location within the state of West Virginia Pikeside (the United States)
- Coordinates: 39°25′03″N 77°59′21″W
- Country: United States
- State: West Virginia
- County: Berkeley
- Elevation: 515 ft (157 m)
- Time zone: UTC-5 (Eastern (EST))
  - Summer (DST): UTC-4 (EDT)
- GNIS feature ID: 1555349

Pikeside is an unincorporated community in Berkeley County, West Virginia, United States. Pikeside is situated along U.S. Route 11, approximately 3.4 miles south of Martinsburg. The community is served by the Eastern Panhandle Transit Authority.

The community was named for a turnpike near the original town site.
