= Glengary, West Virginia =

Unincorporated community in West Virginia, United States

Glengary
- Unincorporated community
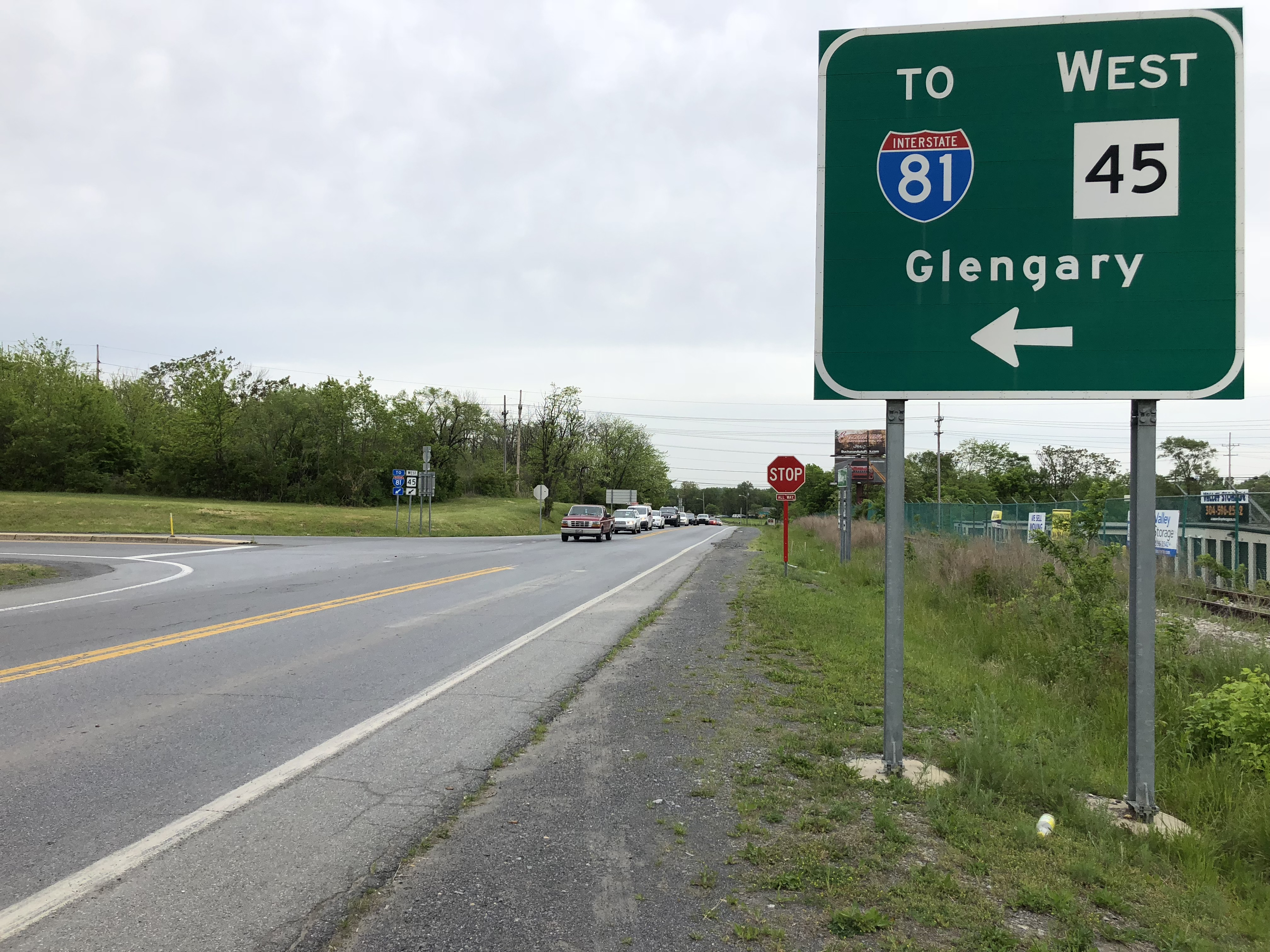
- Glengary, Interstate 81, & West Virginia State Route 45 exit along West Virginia State Route 9

- Location within the state of West Virginia Glengary (the United States)
- Coordinates: 39°23′02″N 78°09′20″W
- Country: United States
- State: West Virginia
- County: Berkeley
- Elevation: 587 ft (179 m)

Population (2000)
  - Total: 277
- Time zone: UTC-5 (Eastern (EST))
  - Summer (DST): UTC-4 (EDT)
- ZIP codes: 25421
- Area codes: 304, 681
- GNIS feature ID: 1539465

Glengary is an unincorporated community situated in Back Creek Valley in Berkeley County, West Virginia, United States. It is located at the intersection of West Virginia Route 45 with County Routes 7 and 22. According to the 2000 census, the Glengary community has a population of 277.

During the January 2016 United States blizzard, Glengary received the largest accumulation of snow (42 inches) of any area affected by the blizzard.
