= Mechlenberg Heights, West Virginia =

- Unincorporated community
- Location within West Virginia Location within the United States
- Coordinates: 39°26′0″N 77°49′47″W
- Country: United States
- State: West Virginia
- County: Jefferson
- Time zone: UTC-5 (Eastern (EST))
  - Summer (DST): UTC-4 (EDT)
- GNIS feature ID: 1555099

Mechlenberg Heights is an unincorporated community in Jefferson County, West Virginia, United States. Mechlenberg Heights lies to the west of Shepherdstown along West Virginia Route 45.
