= Ranson, West Virginia =

Corporation in West Virginia, US

- Corporation
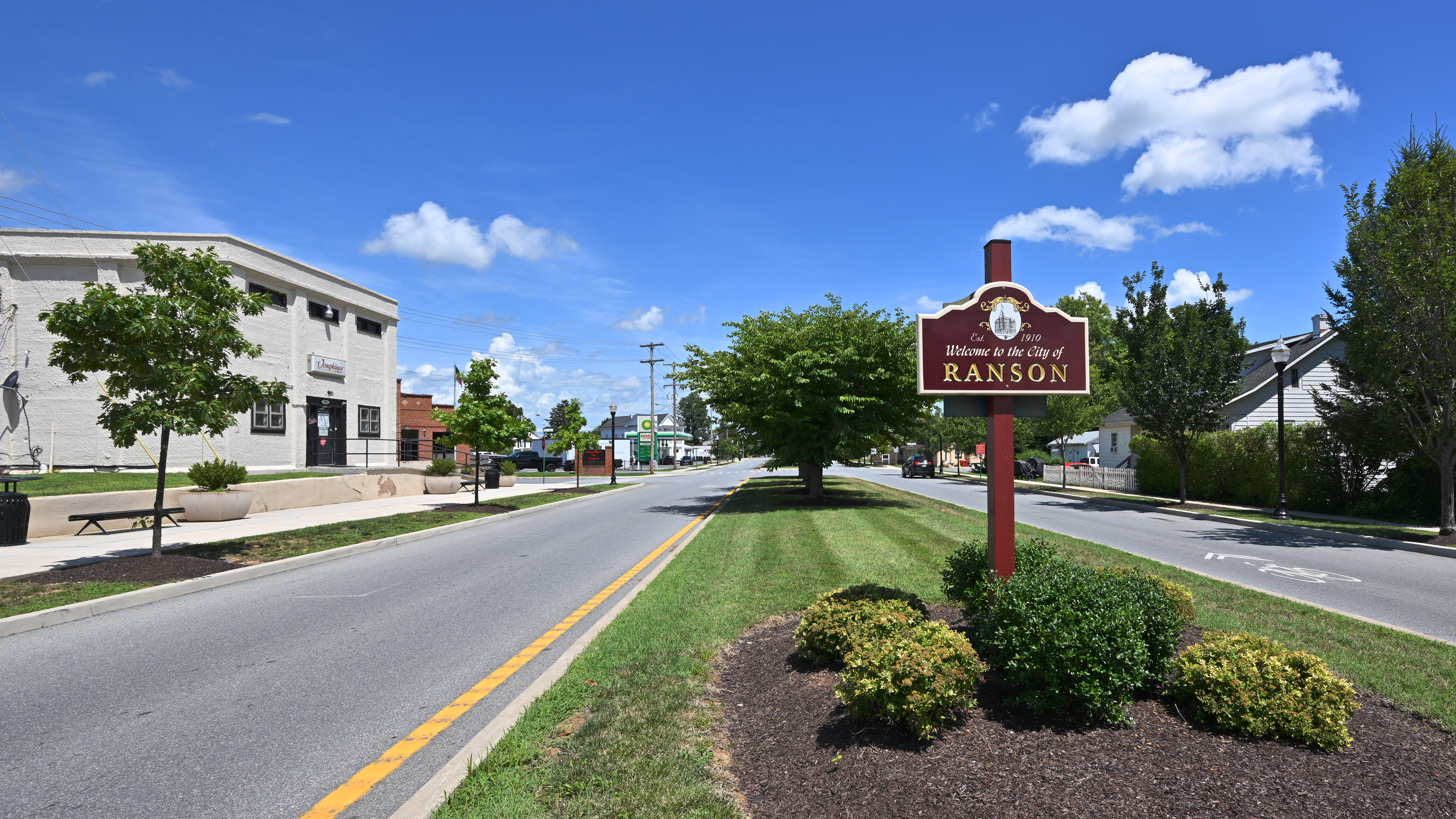
- Welcome sign in the median of South Fairfax Blvd

- Flag Logo

- Location of Ranson in Jefferson County, West Virginia.
- Coordinates: 39°17′55″N 77°51′40″W
- Country: United States
- State: West Virginia
- County: Jefferson
- Incorporated: 1910

Government
  - Mayor: Ken Suits
  - City Manager: Todd Wilt

Area
  - Total: 8.09 sq mi (20.96 km^{2})
  - Land: 8.09 sq mi (20.95 km^{2})
  - Water: 0 sq mi (0.00 km^{2})

Population (2020)
  - Total: 5,433
  - Density: 671.7/sq mi (259.3/km^{2})
- Time zone: UTC-5 (Eastern (EST))
  - Summer (DST): UTC-4 (EDT)
- ZIP code: 25438
- Area codes: 304, 681
- FIPS code: 54-18040
- Website: ransonwv.gov

Ranson is a corporation (Note: The US Census Bureau defines Ranson, WV as a unique "corporation" which acts functionally the same as a city, but was founded by a corporation.) in Jefferson County, West Virginia, United States. The population was 5,433 at the 2020 census. It is part of the northwestern fringes of the Washington metropolitan area.

== History ==
The Charles Town Mining, Manufacturing, and Improvement Company played an instrumental role in creating this new town. In 1890, the company bought 850 acres (3.4 km^{2}) adjoining the western and northern corporate limits of Charles Town, and commissioned D.G. Howell, a civil engineer and architect, to lay out the town. The largest tract of land purchased was from the Ranson family. Ranson, in Jefferson County, West Virginia, was officially incorporated in 1910, when residents, by a vote of 67–2, decided to form their own town. It was named in honor of Dr. James Ranson, a dentist and farmer living in the area.

The early growth and development of Ranson reflects the late 19th century boom of the Shenandoah Valley and surrounding areas associated with the rise of the railroads, mining, and manufacturing. Early photographs of Ranson show the offices of the Charles Town Mining, Manufacturing & Improvement Company, and the Hotel Powhatan, along with a few residential structures nearby. The community grew north from Lancaster Circle. Some of the companies that located in Ranson early on included the Hotel Powhatan, the Goetz Saddlery, the Shenandoah Brass and Iron Works, the Elemer E. Beachley Saw and Planing Mill, the John Farrin Boiler and Machine Shop, and the Vulcan Road Machine Company.

One of the most significant structures to be constructed in Ranson was Hotel Powhatan. This four-story frame Queen Anne structure was located on 3.61 acres (14,600 m^{2}) on 3rd Avenue, between Mildred and Preston Streets. The building was designed by "Baldwin and Pennington, Architects", and was built by local contractor Julius C. Holmes for $46,500. The hotel opened in October, 1891, but in 1900, it had become the Powhatan College for Young Women. In 1913, the college closed, and in 1915 it was re-opened by the Episcopal Diocese, under the direction of Maria Pendleton Duval, as St. Hilda's Hall for Girls, a Christian school. In 1921, a dormitory was added on property across the street from the original building. This new structure was known as Peterkin Hall, and currently houses the offices of Amerigas. In 1931, with the stock market crash, the school closed, and was converted into apartments. The original hotel structure burned to the ground on December 11, 1937.

In 1936, the town of Ranson purchased the former Charles Town Mining, Manufacturing & Improvement Company office building from Mr. Getzendauner for $3,000 for the purposes of establishing a town hall. In 2003, the city began a multi-year renovation of the entire building, bringing it into the 21st century. By 1941, Ranson's population was 1,171. Ranson continued to grow and by 1950, the population increased to 1,436. By 1970, the population had increased to 2,189. In 2000, Ranson had a population of 2,951. By 2010, the population was at 4,440, an increase of over 50% in just 10 years. In the 2000s, the City Council saw a need to grow its tax and employment base after the unfortunate closings of AB&C Corporation, Dixie Narco, and Badger Powhatan, and took advantage of the commercial development opportunities along the 4-lane stretch of State Route 9 north of Ranson. Thus, the Council annexed several thousand acres, which now host commercial, residential, and agricultural properties.

With the construction and opening of the new $425,000 Charles Town General Hospital on October 3, 1948, at the original location of the Hotel Powhatan on 3rd Avenue, Ranson began to develop a medical community, with many doctors opening offices in and around the hospital. On April 22, 1975, Jefferson Memorial Hospital (now Jefferson Medical Center) opened at its current facility on Preston Street and 4th Avenue, at a cost of $4.5 million. The current facility continues to serve the residents of Jefferson County. Just outside the limits of Ranson, but extremely important to the community's economy, is Hollywood Casino at Charles Town Races. This facility provides employment to over 1200 individuals, and generates millions of dollars of taxes to Jefferson County and its municipalities for capital improvements. Thanks, in part, to these proceeds, which began flowing in 2004, the city has been able to purchase police cars and equipment, complete the Mildred Street streetscape project in 2007, which added sidewalks, curb, gutter and benches, renovate and construct parks, and renovate City Hall.

== Geography ==
Ranson is located at 39°17′55″N 77°51′40″W (39.298578, -77.861169).

According to the United States Census Bureau, the corporation has a total area of 8.05 square miles (20.85 km^{2}), all land. Since 2004, however, the City of Ranson has annexed approximately 5,000 acres (20 km^{2}) of land into the corporate limits, expanding the total land area of the city to approximately 9 square miles (23 km^{2}).

== Demographics ==
Historical population
Census	Pop.	Note	%±
1920	699		—
1930	1,002		43.3%
1940	1,171		16.9%
1950	1,436		22.6%
1960	1,974		37.5%
1970	2,189		10.9%
1980	2,471		12.9%
1990	2,890		17.0%
2000	2,951		2.1%
2010	4,440		50.5%
2020	5,433		22.4%
U.S. Decennial Census 2020

=== 2020 census ===
Ranson, West Virginia - Demographic Profile (NH = Non-Hispanic)
Race / Ethnicity	Pop 2010	Pop 2020	% 2010	% 2020
White alone (NH)	3,062	3,444	68.96%	63.39%
Black or African American alone (NH)	615	602	13.85%	11.08%
Native American or Alaska Native alone (NH)	5	9	0.11%	0.17%
Asian alone (NH)	55	155	1.24%	2.85%
Pacific Islander alone (NH)	3	0	0.07%	0.00%
Some Other Race alone (NH)	1	37	0.02%	0.68%
Mixed Race/Multi-Racial (NH)	161	432	3.63%	7.95%
Hispanic or Latino (any race)	538	754	12.12%	13.88%
Total	4,440	5,433	100.00%	100.00%

Note: the US Census treats Hispanic/Latino as an ethnic category. This table excludes Latinos from the racial categories and assigns them to a separate category. Hispanics/Latinos can be of any race.

=== 2010 census ===
As of the census of 2010, there were 4,440 people, 1,699 households, and 1,150 families living in the corporation. The population density was 551.6 inhabitants per square mile (213.0/km^{2}). There were 1,936 housing units at an average density of 240.5 units per square mile (92.9 units/km^{2}). The racial makeup of the corporation was 74.3% White, 14.1% African American, 0.2% Native American, 1.4% Asian, 0.1% Pacific Islander, 5.7% from other races, and 4.2% from two or more races. Hispanic or Latino of any race were 12.1% of the population.

There were 1,699 households, of which 38.6% had children under the age of 18 living with them, 42.9% were married couples living together, 18.4% had a female householder with no husband present, 6.4% had a male householder with no wife present, and 32.3% were non-families. 24.7% of all households were made up of individuals, and 7.2% had someone living alone who was 65 years of age or older. The average household size was 2.61 and the average family size was 3.08.

The median age in the corporation was 33 years. 26.6% of residents were under the age of 18; 8.9% were between the ages of 18 and 24; 32% were from 25 to 44; 23.3% were from 45 to 64; and 9.2% were 65 years of age or older. The gender makeup of the corporation was 48.5% male and 51.5% female.

=== 2000 census ===
As of the census of 2000, there were 2,951 people, 1,208 households, and 782 families living in the town. The population density was 3,402.8 inhabitants per square mile (1,313.8/km^{2}). There were 1,279 housing units at an average density of 1,474.8 units per square mile (569.4 units/km^{2}). The racial makeup of the town was 81.80% White, 14.61% African American, 0.14% Native American, 0.37% Asian, 0.03% Pacific Islander, 1.12% from other races, and 1.93% from two or more races. Hispanic or Latino of any race were 3.15% of the population.

There were 1,208 households, out of which 32.4% had children under the age of 18 living with them, 40.0% were married couples living together, 19.3% had a female householder with no husband present, and 35.2% were non-families. 26.5% of all households were made up of individuals, and 8.7% had someone living alone who was 65 years of age or older. The average household size was 2.44 and the average family size was 2.93.

In the town the population was spread out, with 26.1% under the age of 18, 10.4% from 18 to 24, 31.0% from 25 to 44, 21.7% from 45 to 64, and 10.8% who were 65 years of age or older. The median age was 34 years. For every 100 females, there were 89.5 males. For every 100 females age 18 and over, there were 85.8 males.

The median income for a household in the town was $24,485, and the median income for a family was $30,676. Males had a median income of $26,719 versus $19,559 for females. The per capita income for the town was $12,804. About 20.9% of families and 25.2% of the population were below the poverty line, including 34.4% of those under age 18 and 14.5% of those age 65 or over.

== Government ==
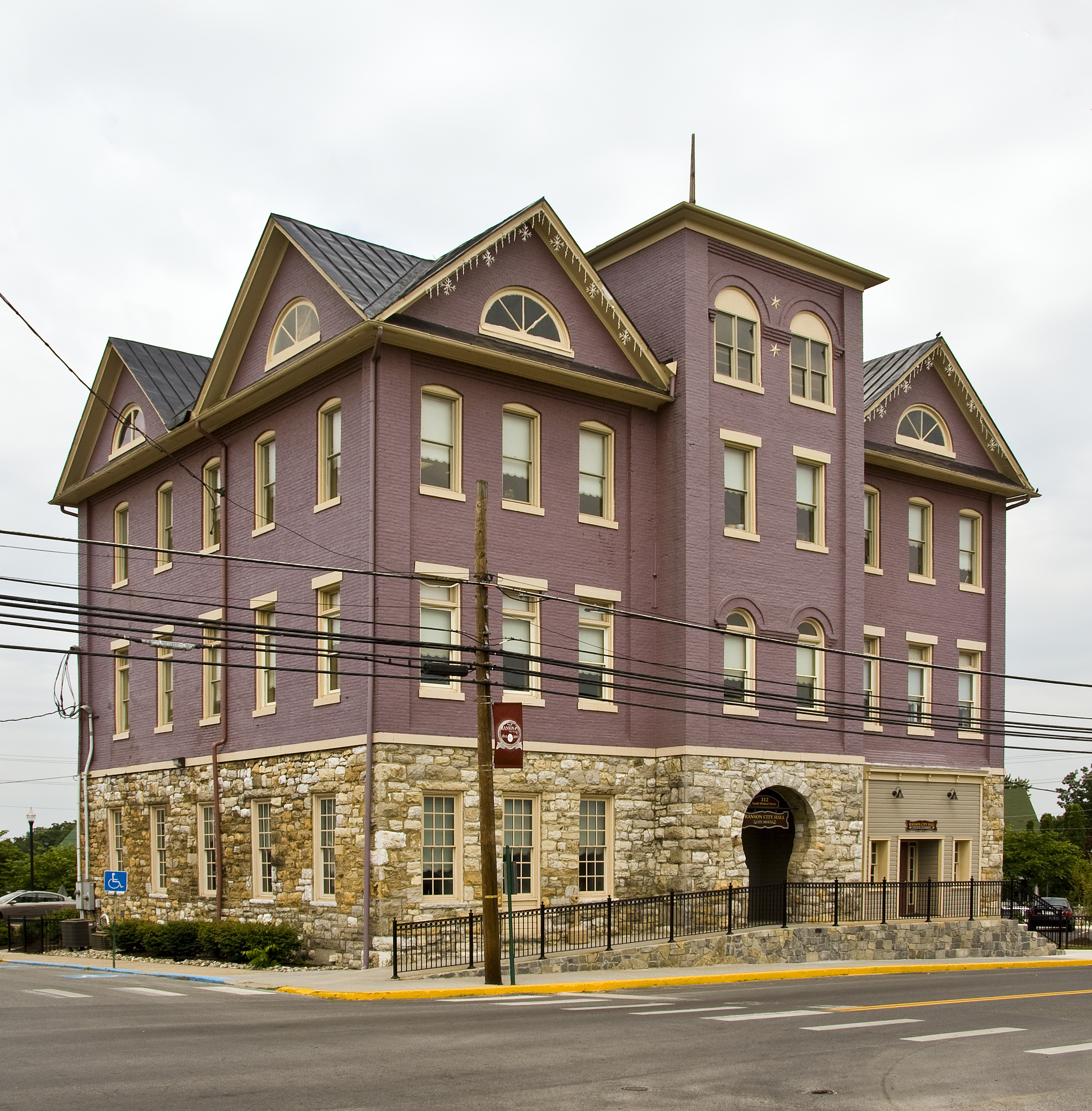
Ranson City Hall WV1

Ranson is governed by a mayor, recorder, and five-member city council, who each serve four-year staggered terms. The city employs a city manager who is appointed by council to serve as the administrative head of government. The city is a fully functioning government, with the Ranson Police Department providing 24-hour-per-day, 7-day-per-week protection to the city's citizens. City Hall is staffed with a Planning and Zoning department, Public Works department, Finance department, and Legal department to carry out the functions of government and provide services to the residents of the city. Two volunteer fire departments, Independent Fire Company and Citizens Fire Company, serve the city and provide it with fire protection. Additionally, the city has its own municipal court system.

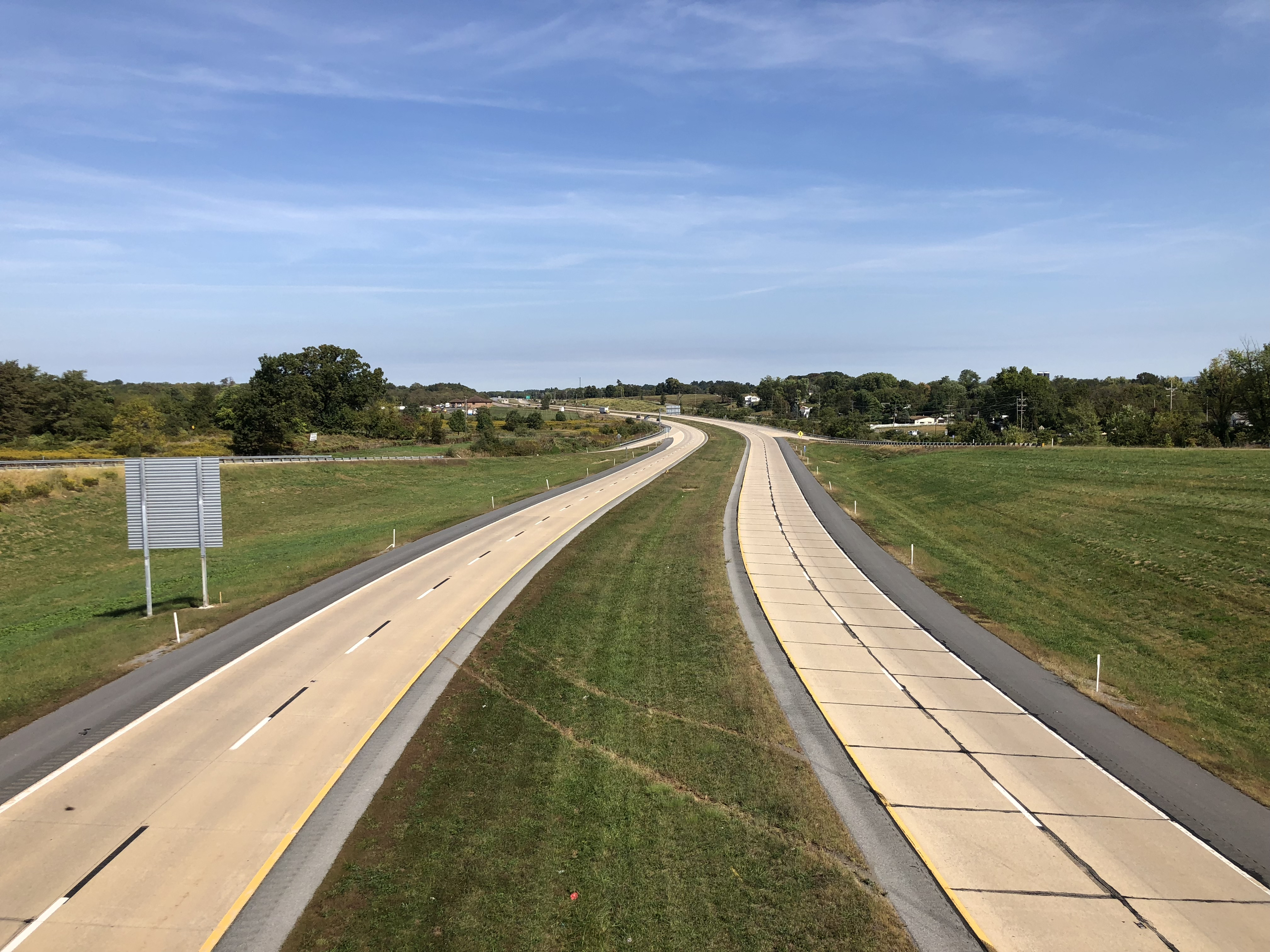
WV 9 westbound in Ranson

== Transportation ==
=== Highways ===
The main highway serving Ranson is West Virginia Route 9. This highway, which is an expressway through Ranson, runs in a general southeast to northwest alignment, connecting Ranson and neighboring Charles Town to Leesburg and Martinsburg. WV 9 also connects to U.S. Route 340 and Interstate 81. The other highway serving Ranson is West Virginia Route 115, which follows WV 9's old alignment from before its newer expressway was constructed.

=== Public transportation ===
Operated by the Eastern Panhandle Transit Authority, Ranson is served by Route 16 and Route 20.
