= Bardane, West Virginia =

Unincorporated community in West Virginia, United States

- Unincorporated community
- Location within West Virginia Location within the United States
- Coordinates: 39°21′46″N 77°51′55″W
- Country: United States
- State: West Virginia
- County: Jefferson
- Time zone: UTC-5 (Eastern (EST))
  - Summer (DST): UTC-4 (EDT)
- GNIS feature ID: 1553800

Bardane is an unincorporated community in Jefferson County, West Virginia, United States. It is located on West Virginia Route 9 between Kearneysville and Shenandoah Junction. Throughout its history, the community has been known as Brown's Crossing and Quincy's Siding.

Bardane most likely was the name of a local settler.
