= Tabler's Station Historic District =

Historic district in West Virginia, United States

- U.S. National Register of Historic Places
- U.S. Historic district
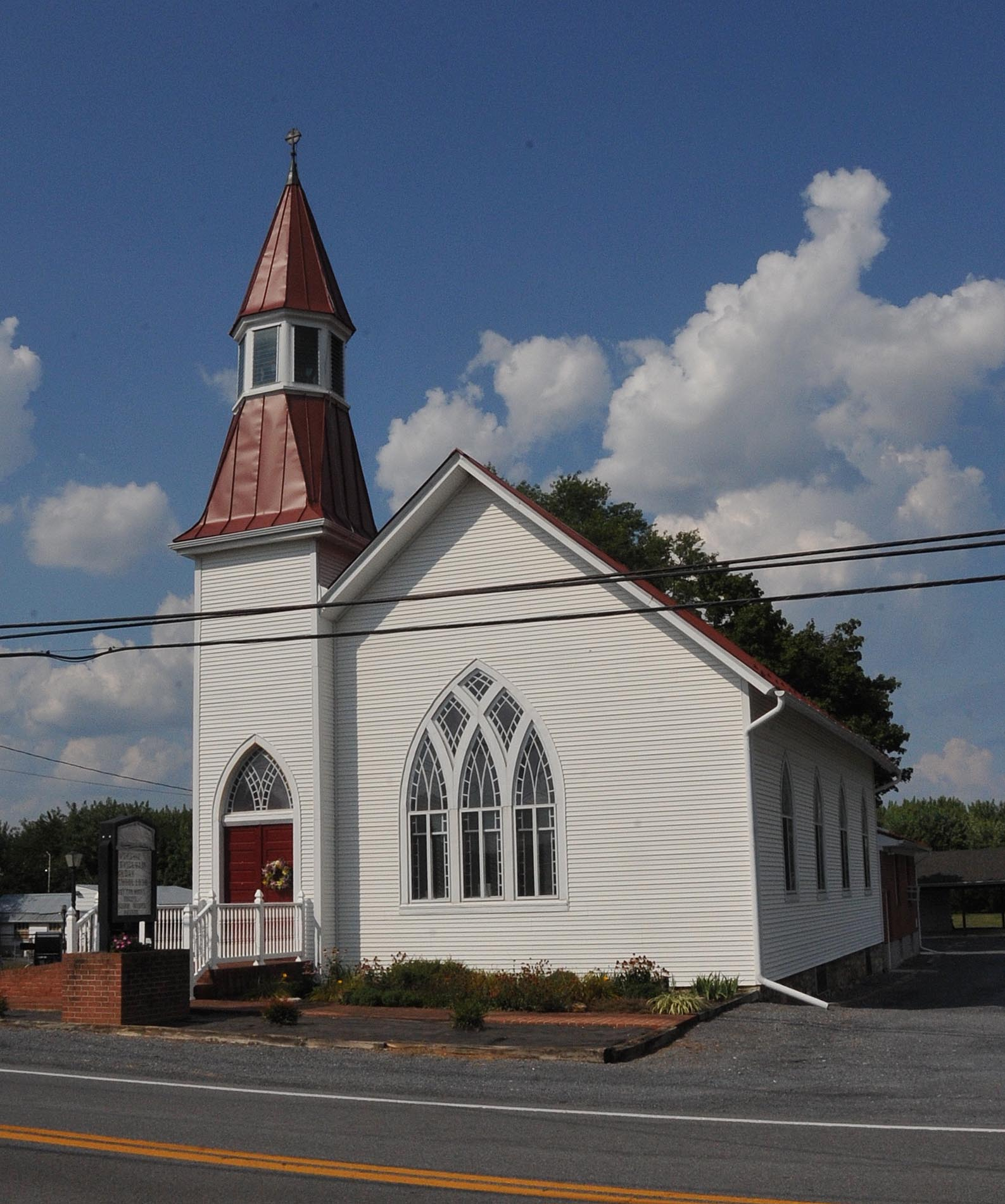

- Location within West Virginia Location within the United States
- Location: Portions of Tabler's Station Rd. and Carlton Dr., Tablers Station, West Virginia
- Coordinates: 39.39781°N 78.00851°W
- Area: 31 acres (13 ha)
- Architectural style: Gothic Revival, Colonial Revival, et al.
- NRHP reference No.: 04000306
- Added to NRHP: April 14, 2004

Tabler's Station Historic District is a national historic district located near Martinsburg, Berkeley County, West Virginia. It encompasses 19 contributing buildings constructed between about 1890 and 1953. It is primarily residential, but also includes the Tabler Presbyterian Church (c. 1900) and Shiftman Brothers Mattress Factory (c. 1940). The houses are of wood-frame construction, between one and 1 1/2 stories in height, and are primarily vernacular in character.

It was listed on the National Register of Historic Places in 2004.
