= Hainesville, Berkeley County, West Virginia =

Unincorporated community in West Virginia, United States

Hainesville
- Unincorporated community
- Location within the state of West Virginia Hainesville (the United States)
- Coordinates: 39°31′35″N 77°55′10″W
- Country: United States
- State: West Virginia
- County: Berkeley
- Elevation: 397 ft (121 m)
- Time zone: UTC-5 (Eastern (EST))
  - Summer (DST): UTC-4 (EDT)
- GNIS feature ID: 1554625

Hainesville is an unincorporated community on U.S. Route 11 in Berkeley County, West Virginia, United States.

== See also ==
- Battle of Hoke's Run
