= Ar-Qua Springs =

Historic house in West Virginia, United States

- U.S. National Register of Historic Places
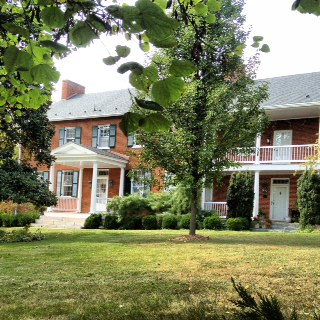

- Location within West Virginia Location within the United States
- Nearest city: Arden, West Virginia
- Coordinates: 39°25′27″N 78°2′18″W
- Built: 1750
- Architect: Thornbrough, Thomas
- NRHP reference No.: 76001929
- Added to NRHP: December 12, 1976

Ar-Qua Springs, also known as the Thomas Thornbrough House or the Thomas Thornburgh House, was built beginning about 1751 near Arden, West Virginia. The house was built by local Quaker elder Thomas Thornbrough, beginning as a one-room, 1½ story limestone rubble house that was quickly expanded with log additions. The house may have been used as a Quaker meeting house during the 18th century.

The house in its present state is two stories in five bays with sections of stone and log. A gambrel roof was added to create additional living space on the second floor. The house has been largely unaltered, apart from the 1960s removal of an attached washhouse and fireplace. The original stone section comprises a single room on the lower level with a fireplace, and two rooms on the upper level. The log section contains on its lower level a dining room, den, kitchen, bathroom and laundry. Its upper level contains two bedrooms, a bathroom and a family room. The house pictured is not the actual house.

The property includes a two-level stone springhouse. Ar-Qua Springs was listed on the National Register of Historic Places in 1976.
