= Tablers Station, West Virginia =

Tabler Station
- Unincorporated community
- Location within the state of West Virginia Tabler Station (the United States)
- Coordinates: 39°23′55″N 78°00′39″W
- Country: United States
- State: West Virginia
- County: Berkeley
- Elevation: 561 ft (171 m)
- Time zone: UTC-5 (Eastern (EST))
  - Summer (DST): UTC-4 (EDT)
- GNIS feature ID: 1555776

Tabler Station is an unincorporated community in Berkeley County, West Virginia, United States. It lies on County Route 32, south of Martinsburg off U.S. Route 11 near Eastern West Virginia Regional Airport.

The community most likely was named after the local Tabler family. The Tabler's Station Historic District is listed on the National Register of Historic Places.
