= Spring Mills, West Virginia =

Spring Mills
- Unincorporated community
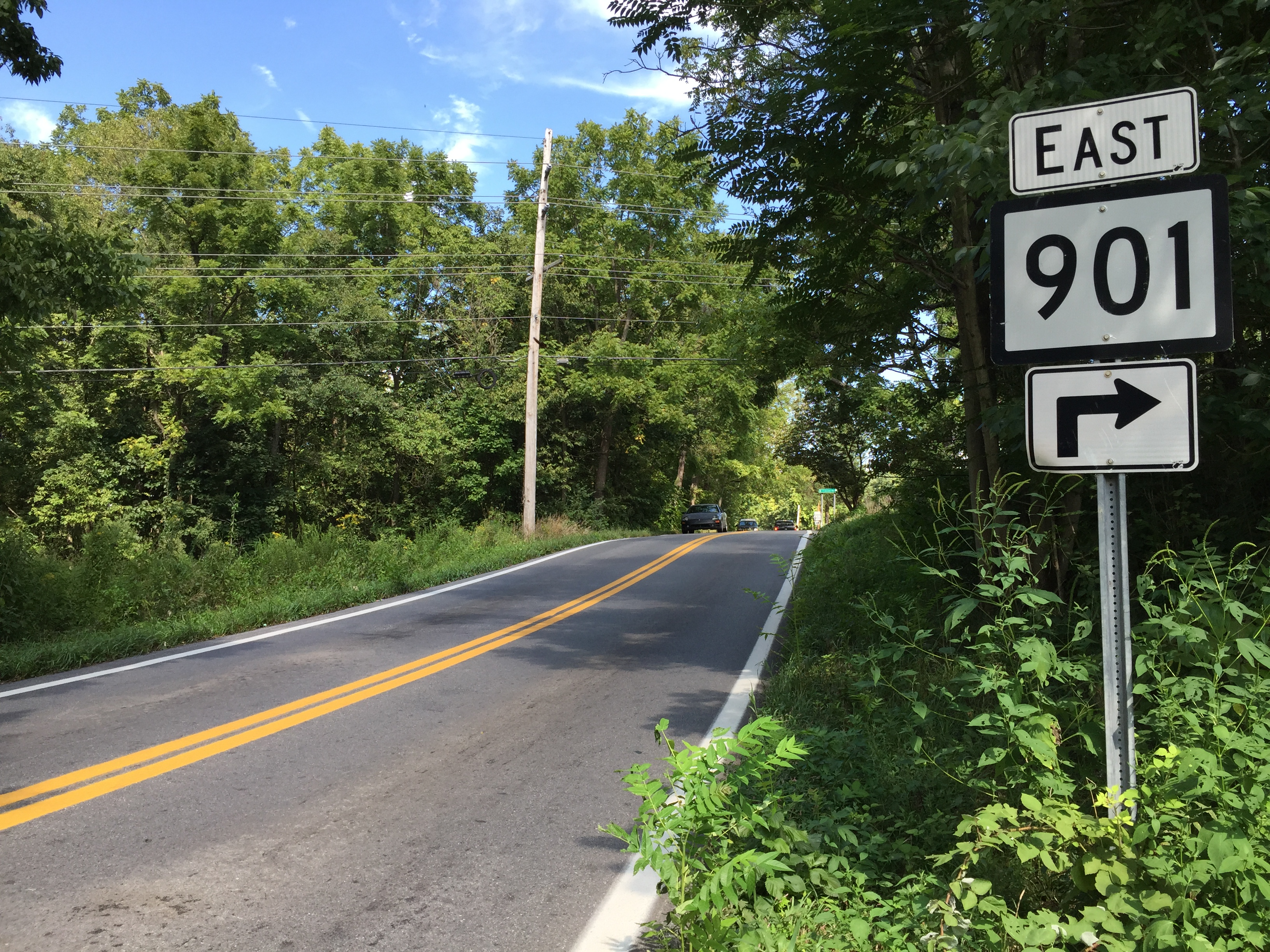
- State Route 901 in Spring Mills

- Location within the state of West Virginia Spring Mills (the United States)
- Coordinates: 39°33′30″N 77°57′14″W
- Country: United States
- State: West Virginia
- County: Berkeley

Government
- Elevation: 446 ft (136 m)
- Time zone: UTC-5 (Eastern (EST))
  - Summer (DST): UTC-4 (EDT)
- GNIS feature ID: 1555692

Spring Mills is an unincorporated community near Hedgesville in Berkeley County, West Virginia, United States. Spring Mills is located along West Virginia Route 901 and U.S. Route 11, 7.2 miles (11.6 km) north of Martinsburg, West Virginia.

Spring Mills Historic District was listed on the National Register of Historic Places in 2004. The district consists of five buildings and two contributing sites.

== Schools ==
- Spring Mills High School
- Spring Mills Middle School
- Potomack Intermediate School
- Spring Mills Primary School

== See also ==
- Falling Waters, West Virginia
