= North Mountain (Virginia-West Virginia) =

Mountain in West Virginia, USA

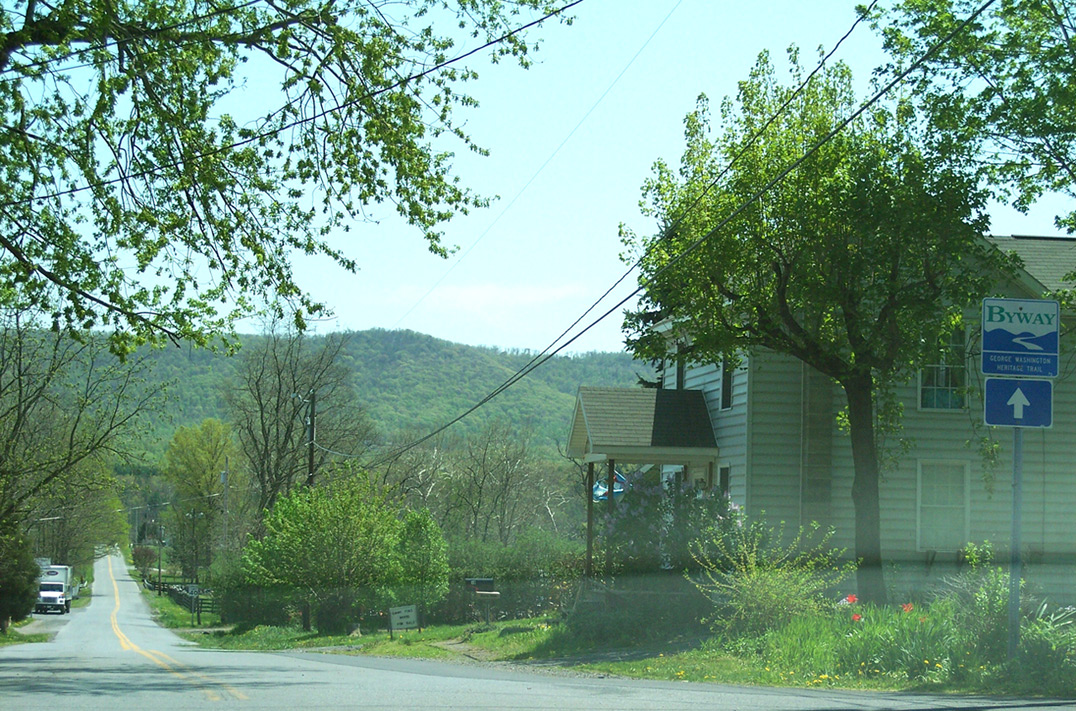
- North Mountain's Roundtop summit in the distance seen from Shanghai, West Virginia, to the west.

Highest point
- Elevation: 1,306 ft (398 m)
- Prominence: 1,073 ft (327 m)
- Coordinates: 39°19′43.36″N 78°9′0.01″W

Geography
- Location: Frederick County, Virginia / Berkeley County, West Virginia, U.S.
- Parent range: Allegheny Mountains, part of the Ridge-and-Valley Appalachians
- Topo map: USGS Tablers Station

Climbing
- Easiest route: Drive

North Mountain is a mountain ridge within the Ridge-and-valley Appalachians in the U.S. states of Virginia and West Virginia.

== Geography ==
North Mountain spans 23.5 miles (37.8 km) from the Potomac River in the north to the community of Green Spring in Frederick County, Virginia in the south. The ridge is divided into two sections; the north and south spans. The north span consists of the portion of the ridge from the Potomac to the town of Hedgesville, West Virginia, which lies 3.5 miles (5.6 km) to the south within Skinners Gap in between the mountain's two spans. The northern span is characterized by lower elevations, its highest point is 920 feet (280 m) just north of Hedgesville, and numerous gaps at valley floor elevations. The southern span consists of the remaining 20 miles (32 km) of ridge line and is noticeably higher in elevation, containing the mountain's highest point of 1,306 feet (398 m) above sea-level at its Roundtop summit near Arden in Berkeley County, West Virginia. The southern section also contains many gaps, but all are several hundred feet above the valley floor. Back Creek Valley lies to the mountain ridge's west and the Shenandoah Valley to its east. Back Creek owes its name to North Mountain, as early settlers in the eighteenth century referred to the stream as to the "back" of the ridge when approaching it from the east.

The Roundtop summit was the location of Cowpuncher, a Presidential Emergency Facility serving Washington, D.C., during the Cold War. The facility consisted of microwave communication relay towers.

== Variant names ==
According to the Geographic Names Information System, North Mountain has also widely been known as Great Ridge and Little North Mountain, when in comparison to the much larger Great North Mountain to the south.

== Summits, knobs, and gaps ==
Although North Mountain is a continuous mountain ridge, it is made up of a number of summits, knobs, and gaps with individual names. These are listed from north to south.

- Potato Hill, 787 feet (240 m)
- Skinners Gap, 640 feet (Hedgesville, West Virginia)
- High Knob, 938 feet (286 m)
- Parks Gap, 1,100 feet (Dry Run Road)
- Boyds Gap, 1,480 feet (Tuscarora Pike)
- Roundtop, 1,673 feet (510 m)
- Mills Gap, 1,180 feet (Apple Harvest Drive and Gerrardstown Road)
- Dutton Gap, 1,290 feet
