= Arden, Berkeley County, West Virginia =

Unincorporated community in West Virginia, United States

Arden
- Unincorporated community
- Location within the state of West Virginia Arden (the United States)
- Coordinates: 39°24′56″N 78°02′36″W
- Country: United States
- State: West Virginia
- County: Berkeley
- Elevation: 663 ft (202 m)
- Time zone: UTC-5 (Eastern (EST))
  - Summer (DST): UTC-4 (EDT)
- GNIS feature ID: 1553742

Arden is an unincorporated community located between Martinsburg and Inwood in Berkeley County, West Virginia, United States.

Arden was named in 1775 by the Quaker Jacob Moon after the district of Arden in Warwickshire, England. It is the location of a number of historic sites including the Arden United Methodist Church, Trinity Church, and Ar-Qua Springs, which is listed on the National Register of Historic Places.
