= Falling Waters, West Virginia =

- Census-designated place
- U.S. Route 11 in Spring Mills

- Location in Berkeley County and the state of West Virginia.

- Location within the state of West Virginia
- Coordinates: 39°33′54″N 77°52′47″W
- Country: United States
- State: West Virginia
- County: Berkeley

Area
  - Total: 1.245 sq mi (3.22 km^{2})
  - Land: 1.245 sq mi (3.22 km^{2})
  - Water: 0 sq mi (0 km^{2})
- Elevation: 443 ft (135 m)

Population (2020)
  - Total: 1,440
  - Density: 1,160/sq mi (447/km^{2})
- Time zone: UTC−5 (Eastern (EST))
  - Summer (DST): UTC−4 (EDT)
- ZIP Code: 25419
- Area code: 304
- GNIS feature ID: 2586801

Falling Waters is a census-designated place (CDP) on the Potomac River in Berkeley County, West Virginia, United States. It is located along Williamsport Pike (US 11) north of Martinsburg. An 1887 Scientific American article claimed that the first U.S. railroad was built in Falling Waters in 1814. The population was 1,440 at the 2020 census.

== History ==
The community of Falling Waters was established in 1815. Because of its location between Hagerstown and Martinsburg on the Potomac River, Falling Waters is a predominantly residential community with numerous historic residences, some of which are listed on the National Register of Historic Places.

Recently the community has had a boom in new residential construction as many people use Falling Waters as a bedroom community to commute to cities nearby and as far as Washington, D.C. and Baltimore.

A 548-acre (23,900,000 sq ft) data center was planned for the area, which would span up to 1,900,000 square feet (180,000 m^{2}). The project received opposition for its perceived impacts on water, the ecosystem, noise, quality of life, and property values.

=== Civil War Era ===
Falling Waters on a map depicting the Army of the Potomac march

Falling Waters was the site of two battles during the American Civil War:

- The Battle of Hoke's Run — July 1861
- The Battle of Williamsport — July 1863 during the Gettysburg campaign

In the latter engagement on the Maryland side of the river, Confederate general J. Johnston Pettigrew, a key leader of Pickett's Charge, was mortally wounded by Union cavalry under George Armstrong Custer. However, his men helped delay the Union forces long enough for the bulk of the Army of Northern Virginia to escape into West Virginia and then on to Virginia following its defeat at the Battle of Gettysburg.

== Historic sites ==
- Edward Colston House, 1598 Tice Road
- Harmony Cemetery, Nestle Quarry Road
- Maidstone-on-the-Potomac, 12 Temple Drive

== Notable people ==
- Mike and Heather Martin of FamilyOFive, lived in Falling Waters.
