= Inwood, West Virginia =

- CDP
- Location in Berkeley County and the state of West Virginia.

- Location within Eastern Panhandle of West Virginia Location within West Virginia Location within the United States
- Coordinates: 39°21′14″N 78°03′19″W
- Country: United States
- State: West Virginia
- County: Berkeley

Area
  - Total: 2.9 sq mi (7.4 km^{2})
  - Land: 2.9 sq mi (7.4 km^{2})
  - Water: 0 sq mi (0.0 km^{2})
- Elevation: 614 ft (187 m)

Population (2020)
  - Total: 3,426
  - Density: 1,200/sq mi (460/km^{2})
- Time zone: UTC-5 (Eastern (EST))
  - Summer (DST): UTC-4 (EDT)
- ZIP code: 25428
- Area codes: 304, 681
- FIPS code: 54-40204
- GNIS feature ID: 2389969

Inwood is a census-designated place (CDP) in Berkeley County, West Virginia, United States, located south of Martinsburg in the lower Shenandoah Valley. The population was 3,426 at the 2020 census (up from 2,954 at the 2010 census).

Inwood is located on U.S. Route 11 and served by the Eastern Panhandle Transit Authority.

== History ==
In the late 1880s, coinciding with the arrival of the Cumberland Valley Railroad (CVRR) extension, a resort that became known as Inwood Park was established on the property of the Strong family of south Berkeley County, West Virginia. On May 5, 1890, the Inwood Post Office opened and the village grew around the Park. From 1892 - 1913, an annual event called the Inwood Fair was held at the Park. This event drew in the range of 7,000 - 12,000 people.

The Cumberland Valley Railroad station in Inwood also included a grain elevator, which ensured that much of the local agricultural products would be brought to Inwood to be shipped elsewhere. Other products shipped from Inwood via the CVRR were wood products, such as bark (for tanning) and railroad ties from the area west of the town. The station at Inwood was one of the most profitable stations on the CVRR line.

The town of Inwood was originally called Gerrard. There are two stories as to how the town got its name. One story is that it was named for the Park located there - Inwood Park, the park "in the woods" - therefore INWOOD park.

The other story is that Inwood's name was changed when Jonathan Newton Thatcher, of Gerrard, wanted to open a post office in the town. Washington D.C. post authorities told Thatcher that he would have to rename the town of Gerrard, since it would conflict with mail going to Gerrardstown, a town 4 miles west. When Thatcher's cousin from Inwood, California, showed him a letter with his home address on it, he decided to use the name “Inwood” for the town. He wrote to Washington D.C. to get the town's name changed from Gerrard to Inwood and to get a post office established there. Jonathan Thatcher was the first postmaster for the new Inwood, West Virginia.

In the early years of the 20th century, a local prominent citizen and politician, Gray Silver, was instrumental in establishing a co-op among the area's many orchardists. The principal crop among those orchardists was apples, because they were less likely to be damaged during shipment and the fact that they could last for long periods of time when stored properly. Through federal funds and the influence of Gray Silver, a school where various aspects of growing apples was established at Inwood.

Gray Silver was also instrumental in putting together a group of investors to bring a commercial apple plant to Inwood.

In 1920, the C.H. Musselman Company of Biglerville, Pennsylvania, opened an apple processing plant at Inwood. This was convenient to the many apple orchards of the Shenandoah Valley and the former Cumberland Valley Railroad, by this time part of the Pennsylvania Railroad line. By the late 1920s, the Musselman plant in Inwood exclusively produced apple sauce, the first apple processing plant of its kind.

== Geography ==
According to the United States Census Bureau, the CDP has a total area of 2.9 square miles (7.5 km^{2}), all land.

== Demographics ==
As of the census of 2000, there were 2,084 people, 810 households, and 596 families residing in the CDP. The population density was 733.8 people per square mile (283.3/km^{2}). There were 849 housing units at an average density of 299.0/sq mi (115.4/km^{2}). The racial makeup of the CDP was 94.19% White, 2.64% African American, 0.38% Native American, 0.96% Asian, 0.05% Pacific Islander, 0.48% from other races, and 1.30% from two or more races. Hispanic or Latino of any race were 1.30% of the population.

There were 810 households, out of which 35.7% had children under the age of 18 living with them, 56.5% were married couples living together, 11.5% had a female householder with no husband present, and 26.4% were non-families. 21.1% of all households were made up of individuals, and 8.6% had someone living alone who was 65 years of age or older. The average household size was 2.57 and the average family size was 2.98.

In the CDP, the population was spread out, with 25.7% under the age of 18, 7.4% from 18 to 24, 33.4% from 25 to 44, 23.1% from 45 to 64, and 10.4% who were 65 years of age or older. The median age was 35 years. For every 100 females, there were 95.9 males. For every 100 females age 18 and over, there were 91.2 males.

The median income for a household in the CDP was $41,033, and the median income for a family was $46,484. Males had a median income of $33,155 versus $23,750 for females. The per capita income for the CDP was $21,359. About 2.5% of families and 4.7% of the population were below the poverty line, including 4.1% of those under the age of 18 and 6.7% of those 65 and older.

== Companies and schools ==
Inwood is home to Knouse Foods Musselman plant. The plant opened in 1920 after it was located there due to the active pursuance of local investors who contributed money to buy the property where the plant is located. It was part of the old Inwood Park.

The C.H. Musselman Plant, in 1929, became the first apple processing plant to exclusively produce canned apple sauce. It can be said the apple sauce literally put the C.H. Musselman plant and the town of Inwood on the map.

In the 1960s the Musselman company became a part of PET, Inc., and after a series of changes in ownership was bought by Knouse Foods in 1984, who continued to operate the Inwood facility until November 14, 2008.

Musselman High School, located in Inwood, was built in 1949 when the C.H. Musselman Company donated the land, materials and labor as a gift to the community. The high school first opened for the 1949–50 school year. Until the early 1980s, the Musselman Foundation, a philanthropic branch of the company, provided expansions and facilities the school needed whenever possible. The last contribution to the south Berkeley County community being the auditorium. When a new Musselman High School was built in the late 1990s, the original Musselman High School was torn down and Musselman Middle School was built on the same site.

Inwood School, now Inwood Primary School, opened in 1926 and in 1970 became a primary school with the expansion of schools in southern Berkeley County. An earlier school was located west of present-day I-81 near Inwood, and can be seen on the Berkeley County map of 1894.

In the early days of Inwood, there was a cooperage (barrel factory) in the village. East of Inwood, to this day, is a quarrying operation, taking advantage of the limestone below the ground for commercial purposes. Today, Inwood is a high growth area and serves as a bedroom community for the nearby Washington Metropolitan area.

In 2024, Philadelphia-based convenience store chain Wawa broke ground for its first West Virginia location in Inwood.

== South Berkeley Volunteer Fire Department ==
The greater Inwood area is serviced by the South Berkeley Volunteer Fire Company, also known as Station 20. Located at 7556 Winchester Avenue in Inwood, The South Berkeley Volunteer Fire Company was established in 1956 in a building located on True Apple Way by several employees of the Knauss Foods group and members of the community. With the continued growth of their service area, the Fire Company was relocated to a larger building located at 8009 Winchester Avenue. During the time at this location, the Inwood and Bunker Hill areas continued to grow in population and calls for service increased.

In 2017 the main station was relocated into a new building that was converted from a big box store location into a brand new seven bay firehouse. Housing Two Engines, a Heavy Rescue Squad, Brush Truck, Utility and Mobile unit that is used for EMS calls.

The S.B.V.F.C. Operates in Berkeley County WV as one of five volunteer fire houses, Although as the volunteer staffing has decreased across the country, The Main station is now Staffed part time by paid staffing from Berkeley County Fire during the hours of 06:00-18:00 (6:00 P.M.) M-F.

The South Berkeley Volunteer Fire Company also operates a substation (Station 29) which houses one Engine located at 4172 Winchester Avenue, close to the end of the Runway of the 167th Air National Guard Base.

The Motto of the South Berkeley Volunteer Fire Company is "It's All Good in Inwood", and " Pride of the Southside".

== Notable people ==
- Conrad Brooks (1931-2017), actor
- Larry V. Faircloth (1948-2023), politician
- Muriel A. Howard (born 1947/48), university administrator
- Sam Rizzetta (1942-2021), hammered dulcimer player
- Gray Silver (1870-1935), politician and agricultural leader
- Mick Staton (1940-2014), banker and politician
