= Hagerstown metropolitan area =

Coordinates: 39°37′N 77°47′W

- Metropolitan Statistical Area
- Hagerstown–Martinsburg, MD–WV; Metropolitan Statistical Area
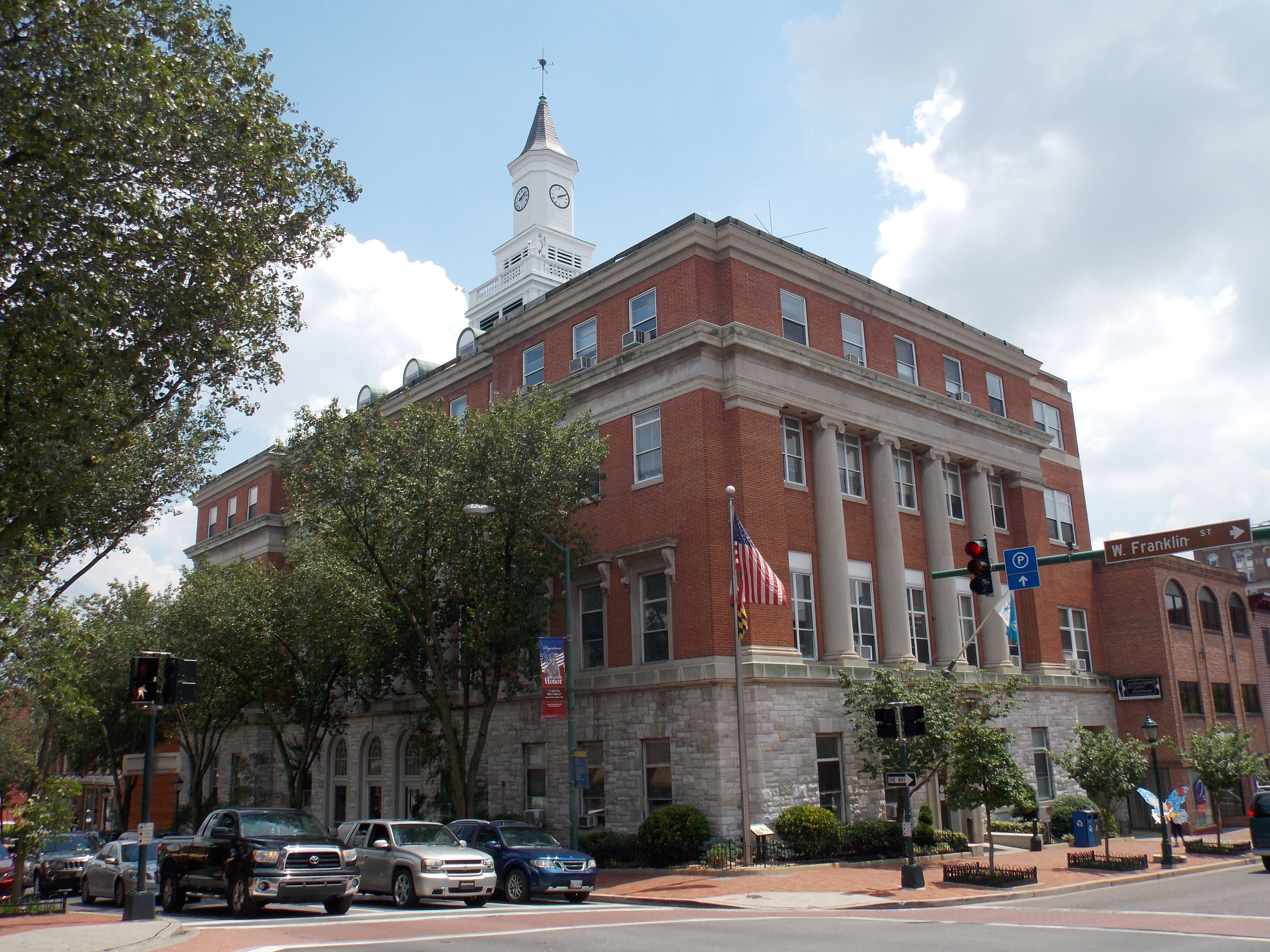
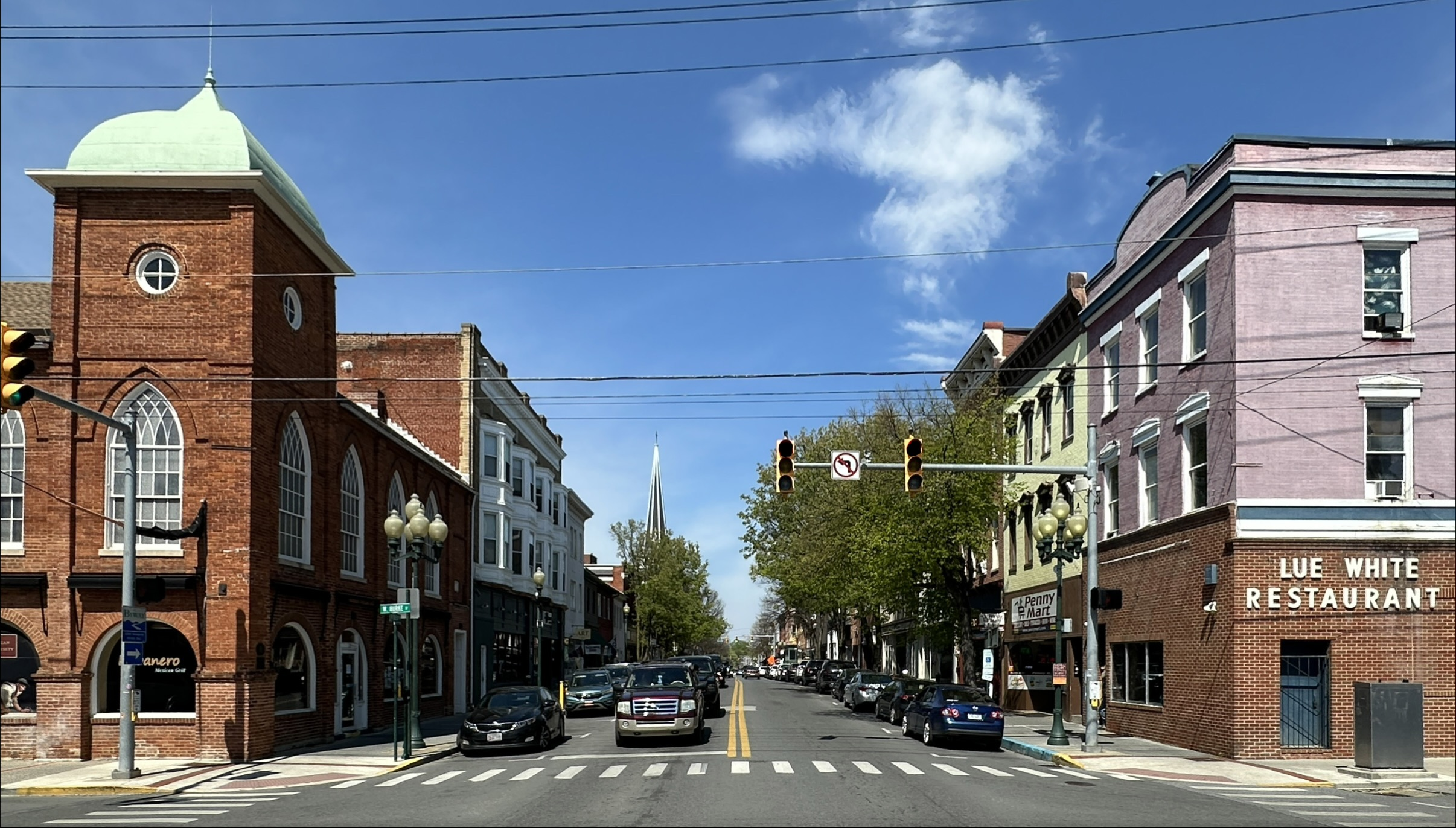
- Hagerstown City Hall Downtown Martinsburg Historic District
Map of Hagerstown–Martinsburg, MD–WV MSA
City of Hagerstown, MD
City of Martinsburg, WV
Hagerstown–Martinsburg, MD–WV MSA
Other Areas in the Washington–Baltimore CSA
- Country: United States
- State: Maryland; West Virginia
- Principal cities: Hagerstown, MD; Martinsburg, WV
- Other cities: Hancock, MD; Berkeley Springs, WV; Paw Paw, WV

Area
  - Total: 1,019 sq mi (2,640 km^{2})
- Lowest elevation: 0 ft (0 m)

Population (2008)
  - Total: 263,753
  - Rank: 169th in the U.S.
  - Density: 258.8/sq mi (99.91/km^{2})

GDP
  - Total: $27.539 billion (2022)
- Time zone: UTC−5 (EST)
  - Summer (DST): UTC−4 (EDT)

The Hagerstown–Martinsburg metropolitan area, officially designated by the United States Office of Management and Budget (OMB) as Hagerstown–Martinsburg, Maryland–West Virginia Metropolitan Statistical Area (MSA), constitutes the primary cities of Hagerstown, Maryland; Martinsburg, West Virginia; and surrounding areas in three counties: Washington County, Maryland; Berkeley County, West Virginia; and Morgan County, West Virginia. The metro area lies mainly within the rich, fertile Cumberland and Shenandoah Valleys and is approximately a 60–90 minute drive from Washington, D.C.; Baltimore, Maryland; and Harrisburg, Pennsylvania; Hagerstown is approximately 75 miles (121 km) driving distance from all three cities. The population of the metropolitan area as of 2008 is 263,753.

== Counties ==
County	State	Seat	2025 estimate	2020 Census	Change	Area	Density
Washington	Maryland	Hagerstown	157,731	154,705	+1.96%	467 sq mi (1,210 km^{2})	338/sq mi (130/km^{2})
Berkeley	West Virginia	Martinsburg	139,522	122,076	+14.29%	322 sq mi (830 km^{2})	433/sq mi (167/km^{2})
Morgan	West Virginia	Berkeley Springs	18,027	17,063	+5.65%	230 sq mi (600 km^{2})	78/sq mi (30/km^{2})
Total			315,280	293,844	+7.30%	1,019 sq mi (2,640 km^{2})	309/sq mi (119/km^{2})

== Communities ==
Washington County (2008 population estimate 145,384)

City:

- Hagerstown (Primary City) (2017 population estimate 140,728)

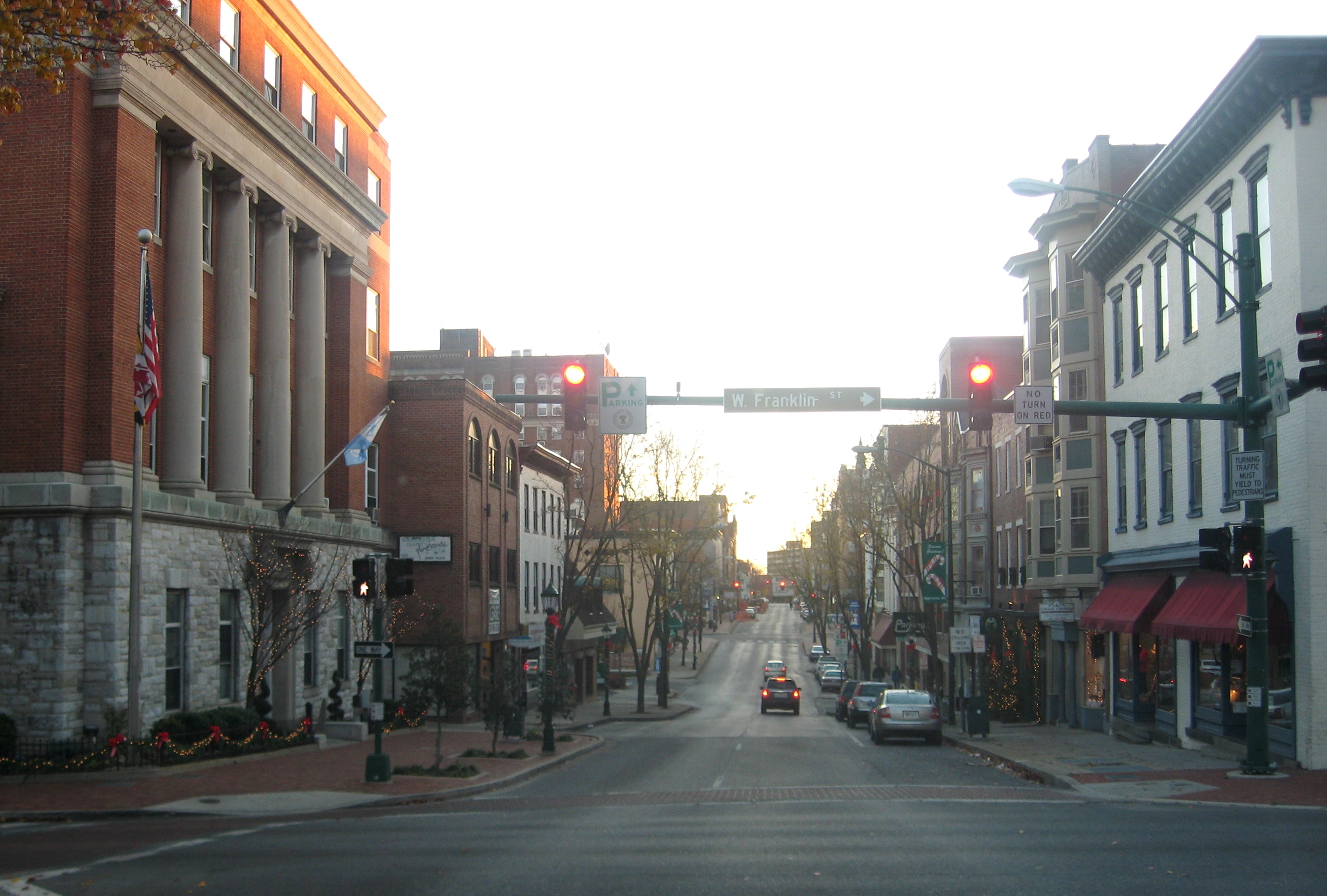
Downtown Hagerstown

Towns:

- Boonsboro
- Clear Spring
- Funkstown
- Hancock
- Keedysville
- Sharpsburg
- Smithsburg
- Williamsport

Census Designated Places (CDPs):

- Cavetown
- Chewsville
- Fort Ritchie
- Fountainhead-Orchard Hills
- Halfway
- Highfield-Cascade
- Leitersburg
- Maugansville
- Mount Aetna
- Mount Lena
- Paramount-Long Meadow
- Robinwood
- Rohrersville
- Saint James
- San Mar
- Wilson-Conococheague

Other unincorporated communities:

- Antietam
- Beaver Creek
- Benevola
- Big Pool
- Broadfording
- Brownsville
- Burtner
- Cearfoss
- Cedar Grove
- Dargan
- Downsville
- Eakles Mills
- Fairplay
- Fairview
- Gapland
- Huyett
- Indian Springs
- Jugtown
- Mapleville
- Mercersville
- Pecktonville
- Pen Mar
- Pinesburg
- Ringgold
- Samples Manor
- Sandy Hook
- Spielman
- Trego
- Van Lear
- Weverton
- Woodmont

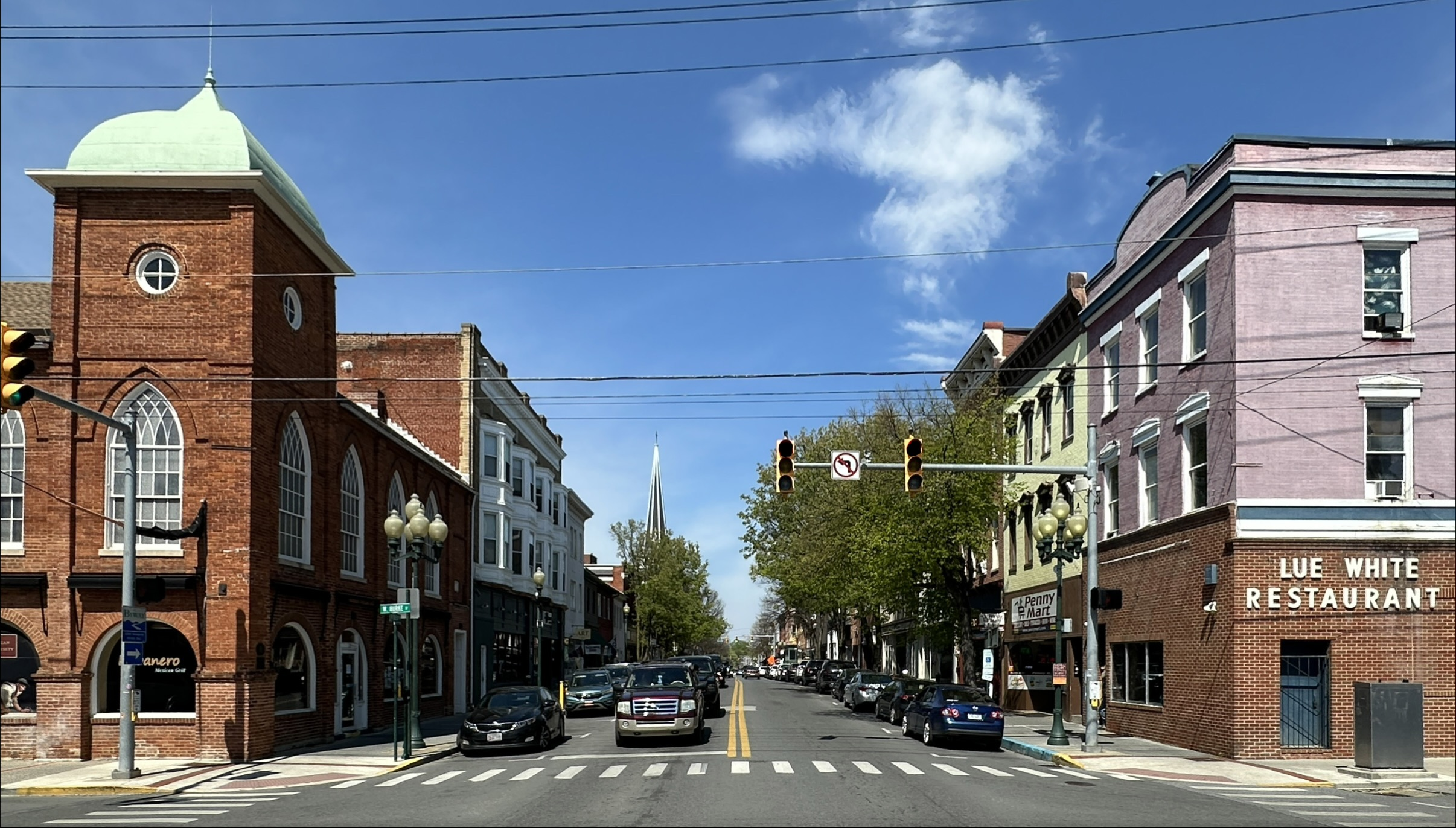
Downtown Martinsburg

Berkeley County (2008 population estimate 102,044)

City:

- Martinsburg (Primary City) (2008 population estimate 17,020)

Town:

- Hedgesville

Unincorporated communities:

- Allensville
- Arden
- Baker Heights
- Baxter
- Bedington
- Berkeley
- Bessemer
- Blairton
- Bunker Hill
- Darkesville
- Douglas Grove
- Falling Waters
- Files Crossroad
- Ganotown
- Georgetown
- Gerrardstown
- Glengary
- Greensburg
- Grubbs Corner
- Hainesville
- Inwood
- Johnsontown
- Jones Springs
- Little Georgetown
- Marlowe
- Nipetown
- Nollville
- North Mountain
- Pikeside
- Ridgeway
- Scrabble
- Shanghai
- Spring Mills
- Swan Pond
- Tablers Station
- Tarico Heights
- Tomahawk
- Union Corner
- Van Clevesville
- Vanville
- Winebrenners Crossroad
- Wynkoop Spring

Morgan County (2008 population estimate 16,325)

Towns:

- Bath (Berkeley Springs)
- Paw Paw

Unincorporated communities:

- Berryville
- Burnt Factory
- Campbells
- Cherry Run
- Doe Gully
- Duckwall
- Great Cacapon
- Green Ridge
- Greenwood
- Hancock
- Hansrote
- Holton
- Jerome
- Jimtown
- Johnsons Mill
- Largent
- Lineburg
- Magnolia
- Mount Trimble
- New Hope
- North Berkeley
- Oakland
- Omps
- Orleans Cross Roads
- Redrock Crossing
- Ridersville
- Ridge
- Rock Gap
- Sir Johns Run
- Sleepy Creek
- Smith Crossroads
- Spohrs Crossroads
- Stotlers Crossroads
- Unger
- Woodmont
- Woodrow

=== Urban areas ===
The metropolitan area contains parts of or all of the following Urbanized Areas and Urban Clusters (that are likewise designated by the OMB) within its boundaries:

- Hagerstown, MD–WV–PA Urbanized Area (2000 Census population 120,326) (part)
- Waynesboro, PA-MD Urban Cluster (2000 population 22,140) (part)
- Inwood, WV Urban Cluster (2000 population 7,784) (all)
- Boonsboro, MD Urban Cluster (2000 population 3,412) (all)

== Geography ==
Hagerstown–Martinsburg, MD–WV Metropolitan Statistical Area (MSA) covers an area of 1,019 square miles (2,640 km^{2}).

The MSA is roughly bordered to the east by South Mountain, to the west by Sideling Hill, to the north by the Mason–Dixon line, and to the south by Northern Virginia. Elevations run from about 250 feet (76 m) above sea level in low-lying valleys to approximately 1,250 feet (380 m) above sea level at Sideling Hill. The Potomac River runs from west to east through the heart of the metro area with tributaries including Sideling Hill Creek, Conococheague Creek, and Antietam Creek. Terrain in the region is very well-suited and used for dairy farming, cornfields, and fruit orchards. Some undeveloped deciduous forestry also exists, especially in the mountainous portions of the area. However, much of the region's land is becoming increasingly threatened by urban sprawl.

Hagerstown and Martinsburg are situated in the transition between the humid subtropical climate zone (Köppen Cfa) and the humid continental climate zone (Köppen Dfa), with hot, humid summers and cool to moderately cold winters where average annual snowfall is around 20 inches and temperatures below 15 °F (−9 °C) are annual occurrences.

== Demographics ==
The metropolitan area's population in 2000 was 222,771. The 2008 estimate is 263,753, making Greater Hagerstown-Martinsburg the 169th largest metropolitan area in the United States. The growth rate from 2000 to 2008 is +18.4%, meaning that the metro area is the 48th fastest growing MSA (out of 363 total MSAs) in the entire country and the most rapidly growing in Maryland and West Virginia from 2000 to 2008. Metropolitan Hagerstown-Martinsburg also registered a higher net numerical population gain from 2006 to 2007 than Baltimore-Towson, MD MSA during the same time period. Much of the growth is due to the influx of people from Washington, D.C. and, to a lesser extent, Baltimore.

== Transportation ==
=== Major highways ===
- I-68
- I-70
- I-81
- US 11
- US 40
- US 40 Alt.
- US 40 Scenic
- US 340
- US 522
- MD 34
- MD 56
- MD 57
- MD 58
- MD 60
- MD 62
- MD 63
- MD 64
- MD 65
- MD 66
- MD 67
- MD 68
- MD 77
- MD 144
- MD 180
- MD 418
- MD 491
- MD 494
- MD 550
- MD 615
- MD 632
- WV 9
- WV 45
- WV 51
- WV 901

=== Airports ===
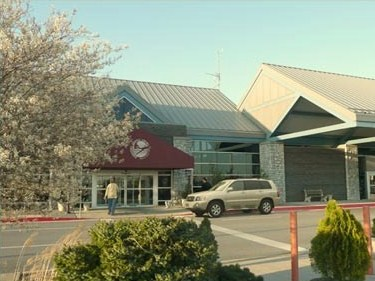
Hagerstown Regional Airport

Hagerstown Regional Airport (IATA: HGR, ICAO: KHGR), also known as Richard A. Henson Field provides passenger service for the Hagerstown Metro Area residents

The Eastern West Virginia Regional Airport (IATA: MRB, ICAO: KMRB), just south of Martinsburg is a designated general aviation reliever facility and also home to the West Virginia Air National Guard's 167th Airlift Wing flying the C-17 Globemaster III.

=== Mass transit ===
- MARC Train and Amtrak (Martinsburg)
- Greyhound and Atlantic Charter Buses
- Washington County Transit (Hagerstown-Washington County)
- Eastern Panhandle Transit Authority (Martinsburg-Berkeley County-Jefferson County)
- Miller Cabs, Downtown Taxi! and Turner Vans (Hagerstown)

== Education and healthcare ==
=== Colleges and universities ===
- Antietam Bible College, Biblical Seminary, and Graduate School, Hagerstown
- Hagerstown Community College
- Kaplan University, Hagerstown Campus (former)
- Mount Saint Mary's University, Hagerstown Campus
- University System of Maryland at Hagerstown
- Vinayaka Missions America University, Hagerstown
- Blue Ridge Community and Technical College, Martinsburg
- James Rumsey Technical Institute, Martinsburg
- Valley College of Technology, Martinsburg Campus
- University of Charleston Martinsburg Campus
- Shepherd University Martinsburg Center
- Kee Mar College, former women's college
- Meritus School of Osteopathic Medicine, Hagerstown

=== Hospitals ===
- Brook Lane Psychiatric Center – Hagerstown
- Meritus Hospital – Hagerstown
- Western Maryland Hospital Center – Hagerstown
- Berkeley Medical Center – Martinsburg
- Veterans Affairs Medical Center – Martinsburg
  - Veterans Affairs Community Based Outpatient Clinic – Hagerstown
- War Memorial Hospital – Berkeley Springs

== Media ==
=== Television ===
- WDVM-TV 25 (IND)
- WWPB 31 (MPT/PBS)
- WWPX 60 (ION)

=== Major newspapers ===
- The Herald-Mail, Hagerstown
- The Journal, Martinsburg

== See also ==
- Maryland census statistical areas
- West Virginia census statistical areas
- Table of United States Metropolitan Statistical Areas (MSAs)
- Table of United States Core Based Statistical Areas (CBSAs)
- Table of United States primary census statistical areas (PCSAs)
