= South Water Street Historic District =

Historic district in West Virginia, United States

- U.S. National Register of Historic Places
- U.S. Historic district
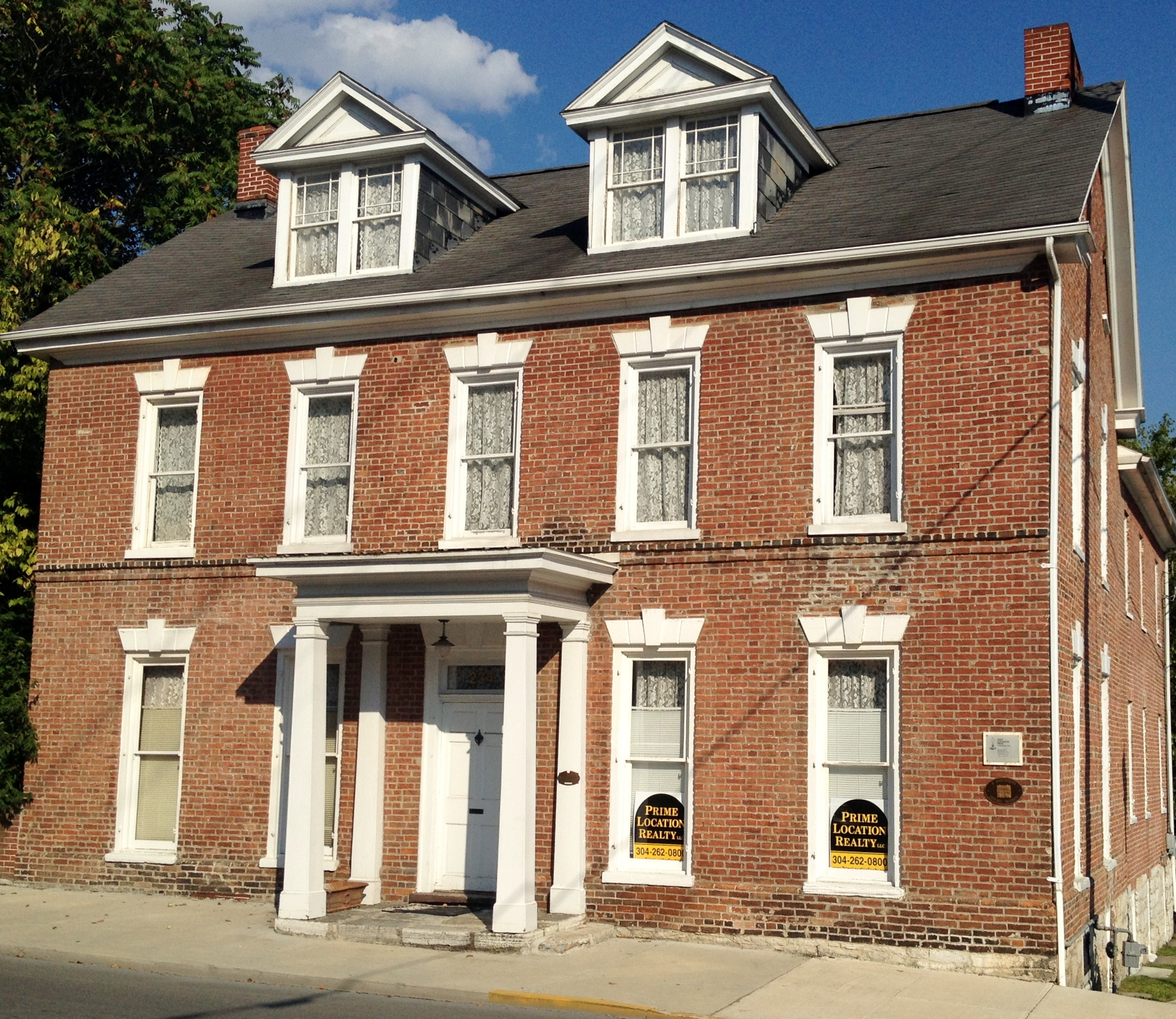
- 234 South Water Street

- Location within West Virginia Location within the United States
- Location: Roughly bounded by E. John, Water, and E. Burke Sts., and B&O RR, Martinsburg, West Virginia
- Coordinates: 39°27′15″N 77°57′39″W
- Area: 21 acres (8.5 ha)
- Architect: Multiple
- Architectural style: Stick/Eastlake, Georgian, Federal
- MPS: Berkeley County MRA
- NRHP reference No.: 80004430
- Added to NRHP: December 10, 1980

South Water Street Historic District is a national historic district located at Martinsburg, Berkeley County, West Virginia. It encompasses 30 contributing buildings and one contributing site, related to residential, commercial, and economic development along the Tuscarora Creek. Notable buildings include: the Edison Electric Illumination Company of Martinsburg building; dwellings along South Water Street at 104–106, 108, 119, 120, 200, 202, 208, 216, and 308; rowhouses at 222, 224, and 226; the O'Hara-Martin House (c. 1795); the Alburtis House; the South Water Street Stone House (bef. 1779); the Martinsburg Steam Laundry Company building; and Martinsburg Gas Company Complex (c. 1872–1905). Also located in the district is the separately listed General Adam Stephen House (c. 1772–1798).

It was listed on the National Register of Historic Places in 1980.

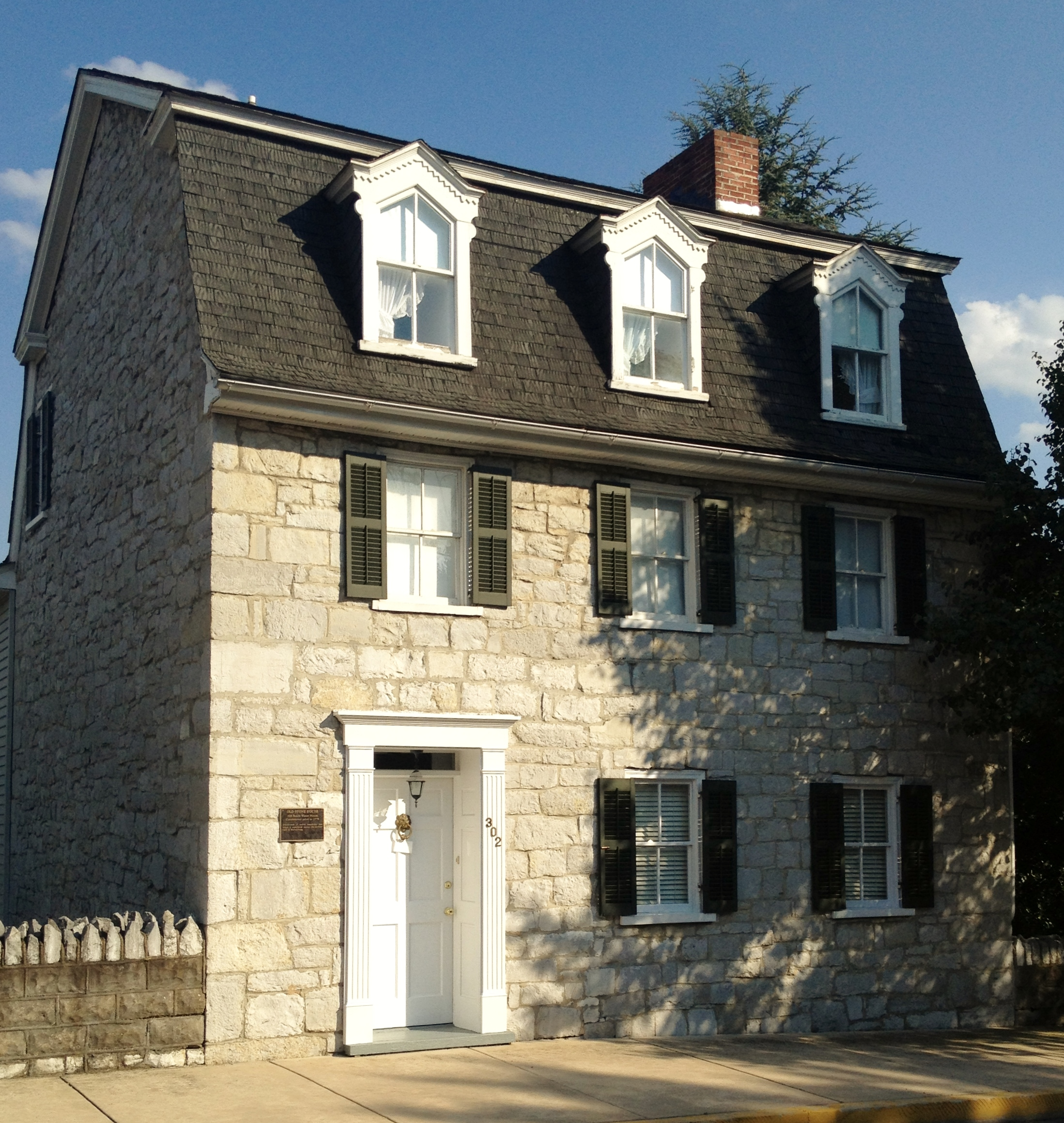
302 South Water Street
