= George Schlack House =

Historic house in West Virginia, United States

- U.S. National Register of Historic Places
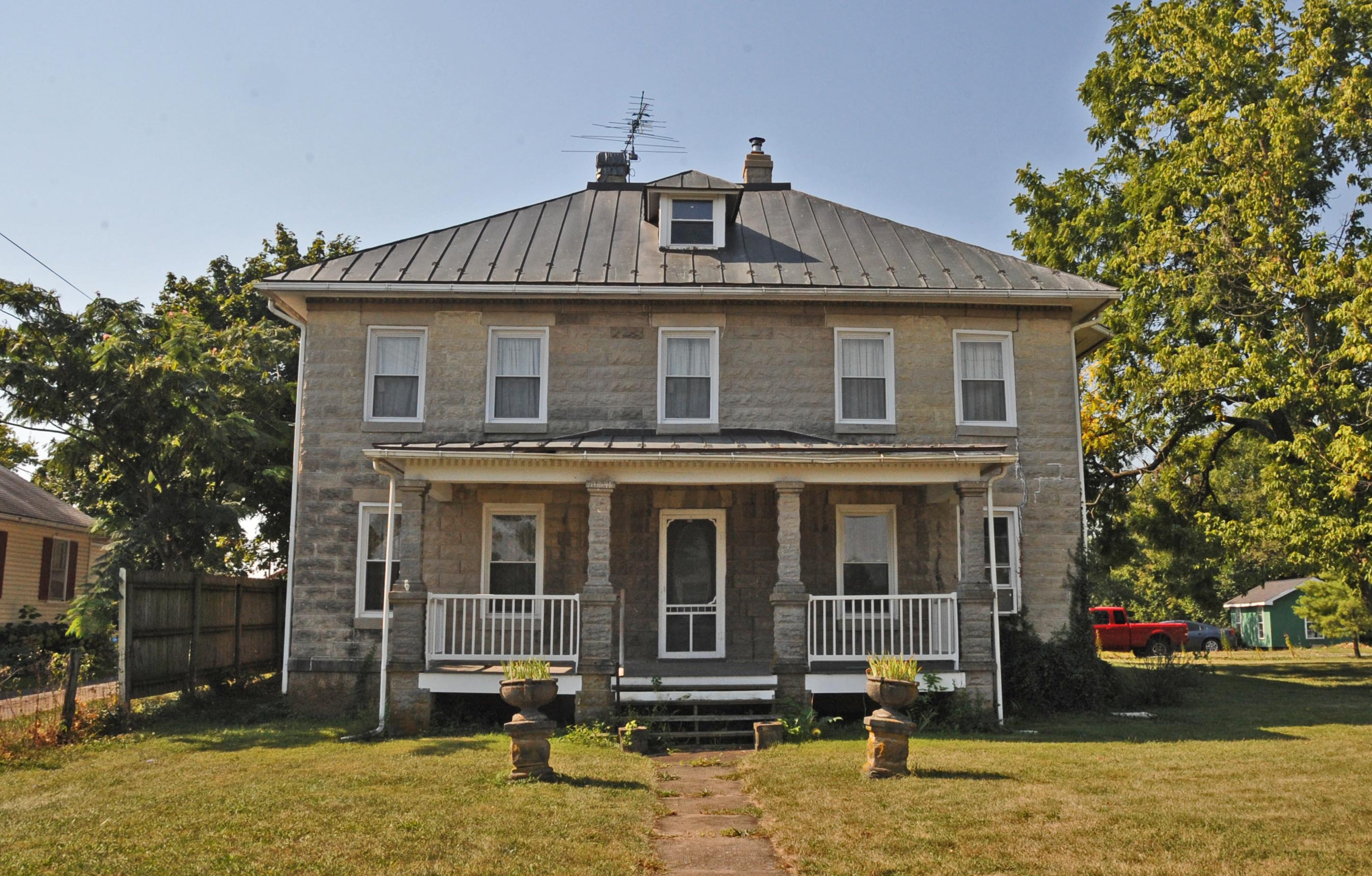

- Location within West Virginia Location within the United States
- Location: 212 Speck's Run Rd., near Ridgeway, West Virginia
- Coordinates: 39°17′45.09″N 78°3′51.02″W
- Area: less than one acre
- Built: 1913
- Architectural style: Colonial Revival
- NRHP reference No.: 08000927
- Added to NRHP: September 18, 2008

George Schlack House is a historic home located near Ridgeway, Berkeley County, West Virginia. It was built in 1913 and is a 2 1/2-story rectangular Colonial Revival style dwelling built of concrete block and finished in rock-faced concrete block. It is five bays in width and four bays deep with a truncated hipped roof and denticulated trim.

It was listed on the National Register of Historic Places in 2008.
