= Redbud Hollow =

Historic house in West Virginia, United States

- U.S. National Register of Historic Places
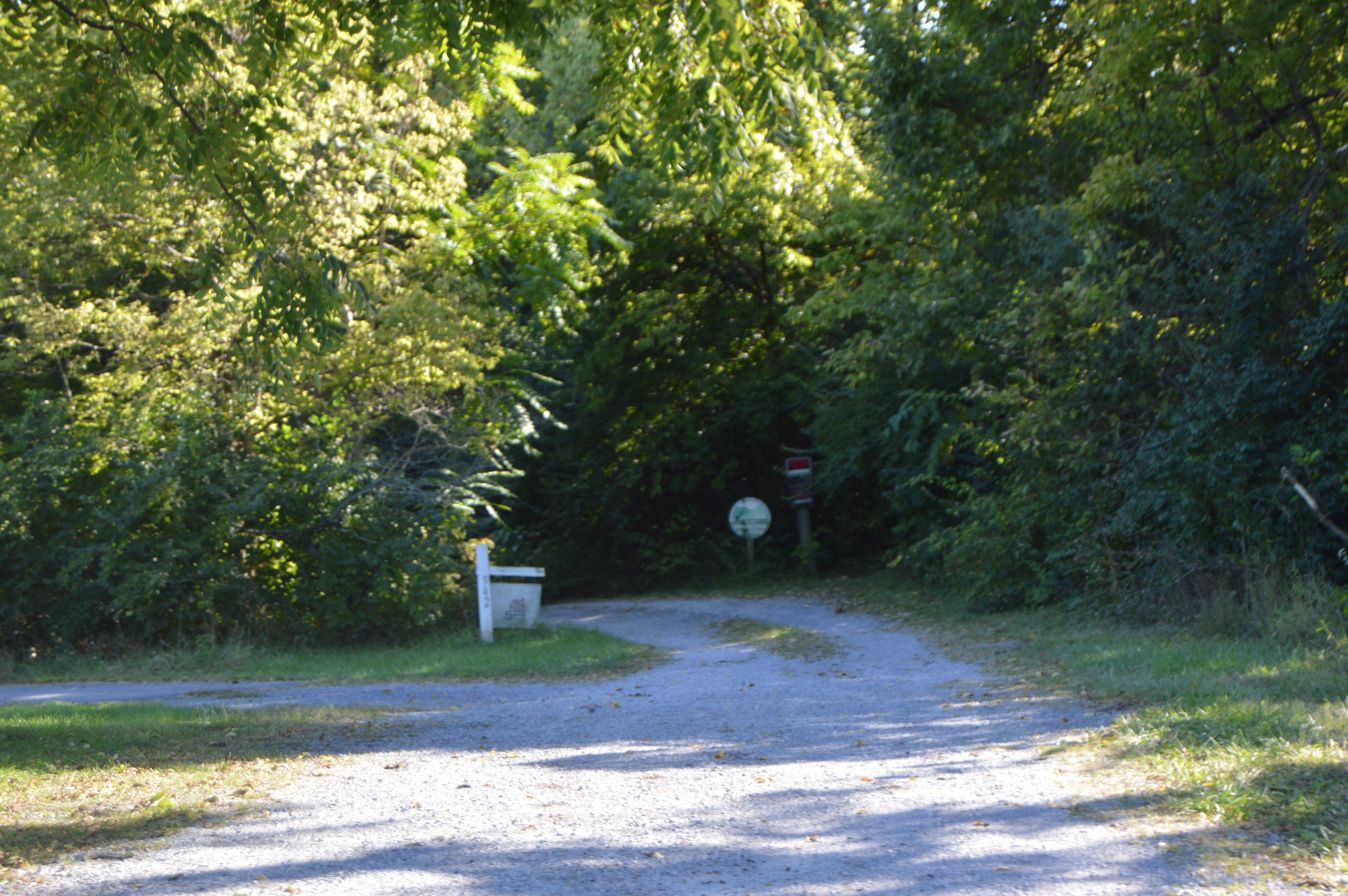
- Property entrance

- Location within West Virginia Location within the United States
- Nearest city: Martinsburg, West Virginia
- Coordinates: 39°23′42″N 78°4′32″W
- Area: 1 acre (0.40 ha)
- Built: c. 1750
- Architect: Cambell, Dousal
- MPS: Berkeley County MRA
- NRHP reference No.: 80004424
- Added to NRHP: December 10, 1980

Redbud Hollow consists of two historic homes located at Union Corner near Martinsburg, Berkeley County, West Virginia. They are two log buildings built about 1750. Each building has a massive stone chimney.

It was listed on the National Register of Historic Places in 1980.
