= Van Clevesville, West Virginia =

Van Clevesville
- Unincorporated community
- Location within the state of West Virginia Van Clevesville (the United States)
- Coordinates: 39°25′44″N 77°54′18″W
- Country: United States
- State: West Virginia
- County: Berkeley
- Elevation: 472 ft (144 m)
- Time zone: UTC-5 (Eastern (EST))
  - Summer (DST): UTC-4 (EDT)
- GNIS feature ID: 1555876

Van Clevesville is an unincorporated community in Berkeley County, West Virginia, United States. It is located between the communities of Baker Heights and Winebrenners Crossroad.
