= Mercersville =

Mercersville may refer to a location in the United States:

- Mercersville, Maryland
- Mercer, North Carolina, formerly called Mercersville
