= Baxter, West Virginia =

Baxter is the name of several communities in the U.S. state of West Virginia.

- Baxter, Berkeley County, West Virginia
- Baxter, Marion County, West Virginia
