= Vanville =

Vanville can be:

- Vanvillé, Seine-et-Marne, France
- Vanville, West Virginia, United States
