= James Nathanial Burwell House =

Historic house in West Virginia, United States

- U.S. National Register of Historic Places
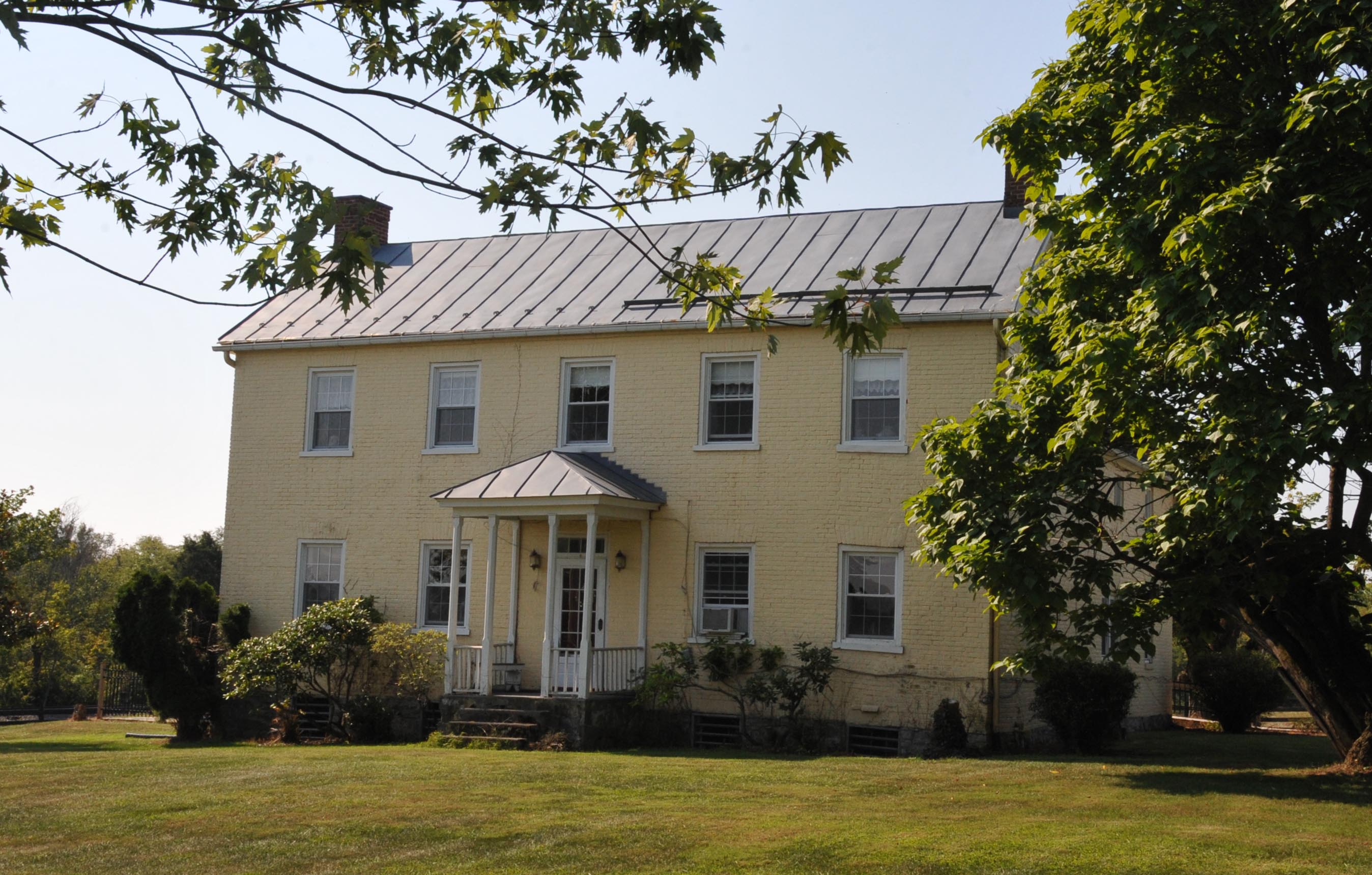

- Location within West Virginia Location within the United States
- Location: Berkeley County, West Virginia, USA
- Nearest city: Ridgeway, West Virginia
- Coordinates: 39°17′36″N 78°4′27″W
- Built: 1842
- Architectural style: Greek Revival, Federal, Vernacular Federal
- NRHP reference No.: 91000553
- Added to NRHP: May 16, 1991

The James Nathanial Burwell House, also known as Yellow House Farm, was built about 1842 near Ridgeway, West Virginia. The house is a late example of the Federal Style, with some Greek Revival features, unique in Berkeley County.

The brick house is L-shaped in plan, with a five bay front elevation. A small porch features chamfered columns with a Greek Revival character. The interior is a central hall plan with a room on either side of the stair hall and two rooms in the rear ell.

The house was listed on the National Register of Historic Places in 1991.
