= Adam Stephen House =

Historic house in West Virginia, United States

- U.S. National Register of Historic Places
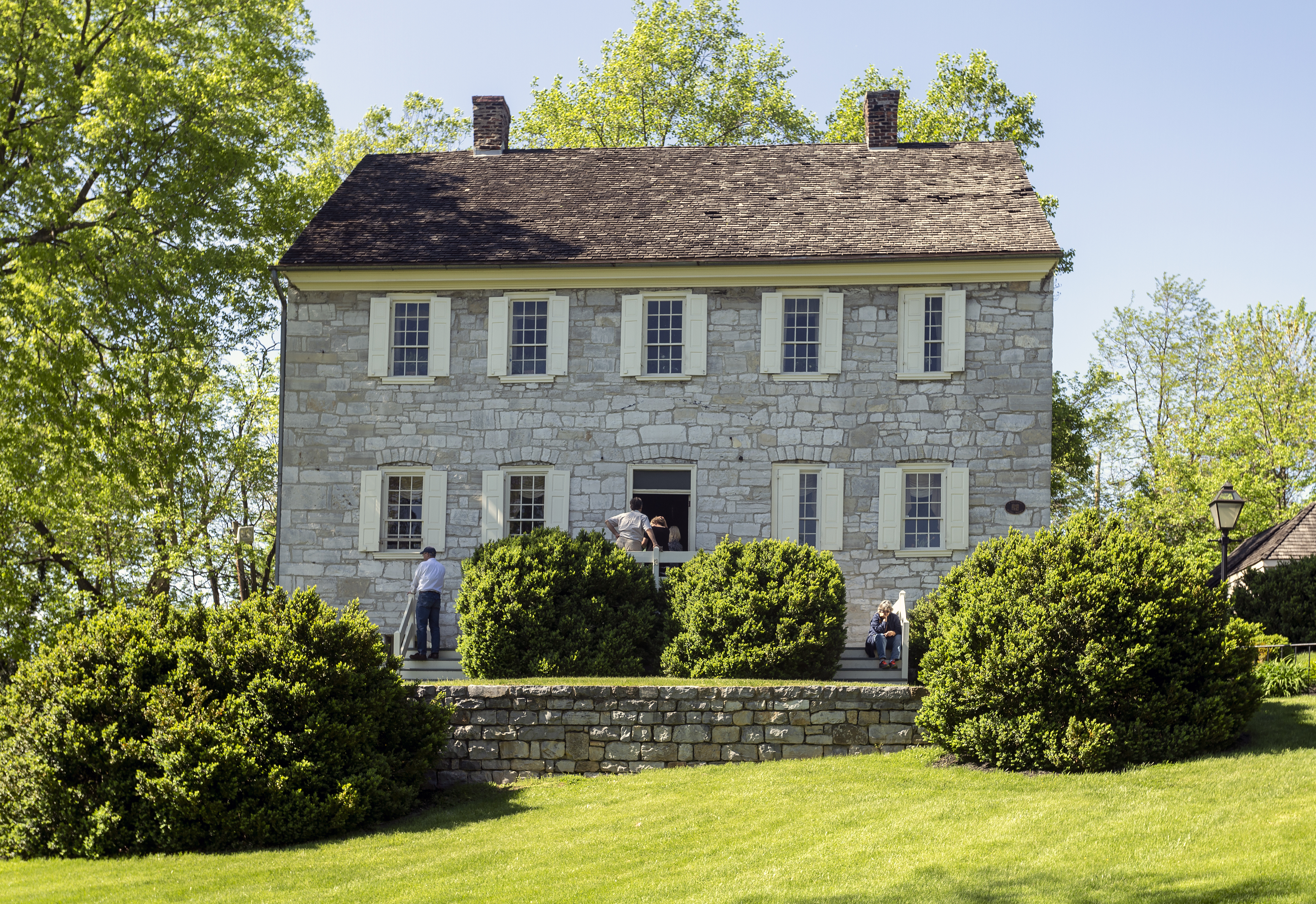

- Location within West Virginia Location within the United States
- Location: 309 E. John St., Martinsburg, West Virginia
- Coordinates: 39°27′16″N 77°57′39″W
- Area: 2.2 acres (0.89 ha)
- Built: 1772
- NRHP reference No.: 70000650
- Added to NRHP: October 15, 1970

Adam Stephen House is a historic home located at Martinsburg, Berkeley County, West Virginia. It was built between 1772 and 1789, and is a 2 1/2-story, stone house measuring 43 feet, 5 inches, by 36 feet, 3 inches. It was the home of Adam Stephen (c. 1718 – July 16, 1791). Built of shaped limestone, it stands on a prominent stone ledge, with two outbuildings in stone and log. After falling into near-ruin, it was restored in the 1960s by the General Adam Stephen Memorial Association and is open as a historic house museum. The house was built over a natural cave, with stone steps leading down from the basement. A local caver's organization has worked since 2002 to excavate the cave, which had become plugged with earth, and the excavation is available for tours on open house days.

The site also includes the Triple Brick House, a brick two-story building built into the embankment next to the railroad tracks that run close to the site. It was built about 1875, and was primarily for residential use, but may also have been a kitchen for dining cars on the B&O railroad line.

It was listed on the National Register of Historic Places in 1970. It is located within the South Water Street Historic District, listed in 1980.
