= Opequon Creek =

Potomac River tributary in Virginia and West Virginia, US

Coordinates: 39°30′58.35″N 77°51′52.99″W

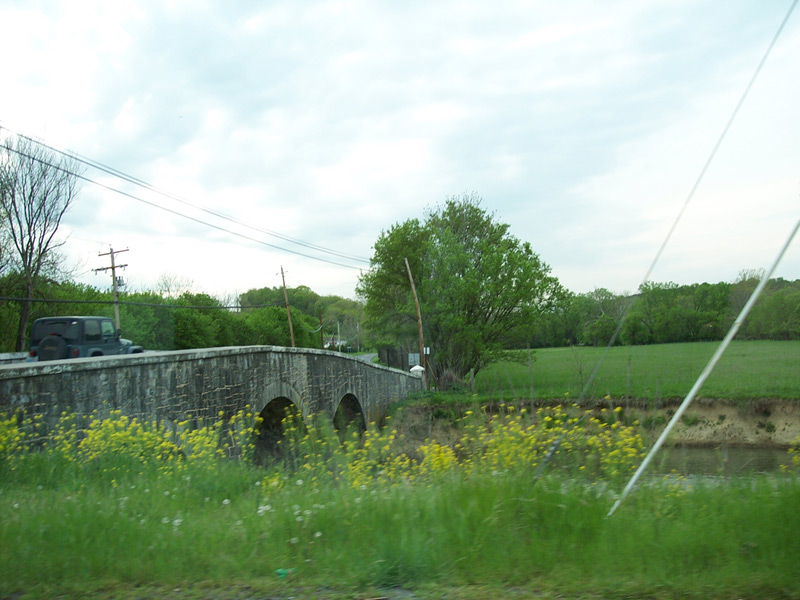
Opequon Creek bridge near Martinsburg, WV

Opequon Creek (historically also Opecken) is an approximately 35-mile (56-kilometre) tributary stream of the Potomac River. It was originally known by the Indians and settlers as a river and was historically called Opequon River as a result It flows into the Potomac northeast of Martinsburg in Berkeley County, West Virginia, and its source lies northwest of the community of Opequon at the foot of Great North Mountain in Frederick County, Virginia. The Opequon forms part of the boundary between Frederick and Clarke counties in Virginia and also partially forms the boundary between Berkeley and Jefferson counties in West Virginia's Eastern Panhandle.

Opequon is a name derived from an unidentified local Native American language.

== Tributaries ==
Streams are listed from south (headwaters) to the north (mouth).

- Stribling Run
- Hoge Run
- Wrights Run
- Buffalo Lick Run
- Sulphur Spring Run
- Isaac Run
- Abrams Creek
  - Town Run
  - Ash Hollow Run
- Redbud Run
- Dry Marsh Run
- Lick Run
- Littlers Run
  - Ross Run
- Thomas Run
- Abrils Run
- Duncan Run
- Silver Spring Run
- Specks Run
- Turkey Run
- Mill Creek
  - Torytown Run
  - Sylvan Run
- Three Run
- Goose Creek
- Middle Creek
- Hopewell Run
  - Dry Run
- Buzzard Run
- Sulphur Spring Branch
- Spa Run
- Cold Spring Run
- Evitt's Run
- Tuscarora Creek
- Eagle Run
- Hoke Run

== Flora and fauna ==
The Opequon Creek is home to many species of crayfish and minnow. Many species of turtles also inhabit the creek, most notably the eastern box turtle. Snakes are very common, with copperheads and garter snakes being the most numerous. Many species of mammals live near the creek's water, the biggest being the white-tailed deer. Plants types that live along the creek include grasses, water lilies, and aquatic plants. sycamore trees, tulip trees, and willow trees grow along the creek's banks.

== Water flow ==
Due to water runoff during rainfall, the water flow of the Opequon Creek varies. In the spring, the creek's output of water is very high due to wet conditions during spring. In the summer, the water flow is usually normal, with thunderstorms raising the water, and short-term droughts lowering the water. In autumn, the water level is usually below-normal due to dry conditions and lower rainfall. During the winter however, the creek is usually at its highest because of low evaporation caused by cold temperatures and thick cloud covers. The creek rarely freezes over, but sometimes stagnant water will freeze through.

== Water quality ==
The water quality of Opequon Creek is very mixed. While the creek is in the North Mountain, its water quality is general good because of the low pollution and the low population of North Mountain. Its water quality dramatically drops once it joins the spring-fed streams because of agricultural run-off. Due to numerous dams though, this run-off doesn't always make it to the Potomac River. When it joins the Potomac, its water quality is good to moderate.

== List of cities and towns along Opequon Creek ==
- Baker Heights
- Bartonsville
- Bedington
- Blairton
- Burnt Factory
- Leetown
- Martinsburg
- Middleway
- Opequon
- Parkins Mills
- Tarico Heights
- Wadesville
- Inwood
- Winchester

== See also ==
- List of West Virginia rivers
- List of Virginia rivers
