= Opequon, Virginia =

Unincorporated community in Virginia, United States

- Unincorporated community
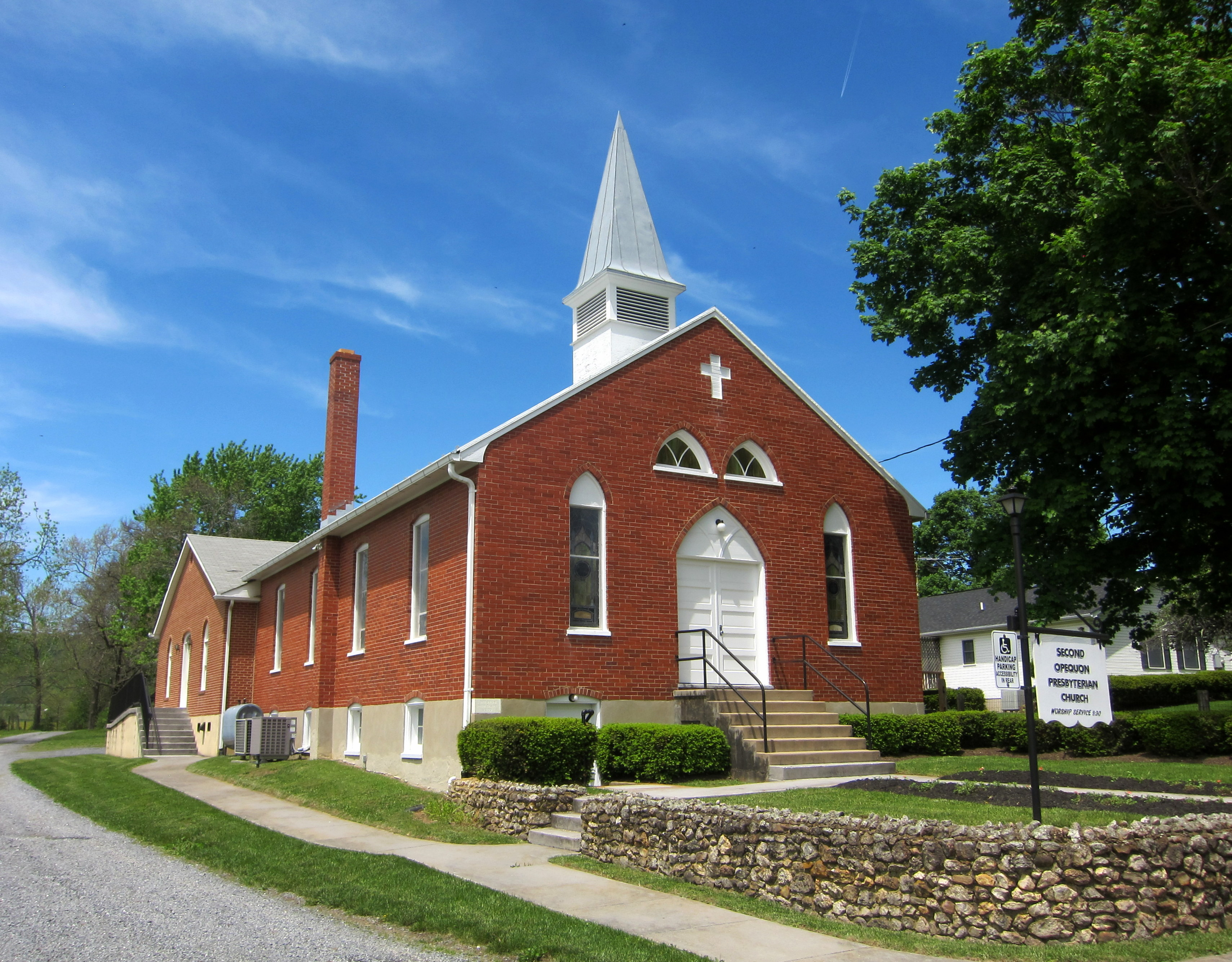
- Second Opequon Presbyterian Church

- Location within Virginia Location within the United States
- Coordinates: 39°9′26″N 78°14′48″W
- Country: United States
- State: Virginia
- County: Frederick
- Time zone: UTC−5 (Eastern (EST))
  - Summer (DST): UTC−4 (EDT)
- GNIS feature ID: 1499825

Opequon is an unincorporated community along Opequon Creek in Frederick County, northwestern Virginia, United States. Also known as Kernstown, the community center is served by Cedar Creek Grade (VA 622) at Miller Road (VA 620).

The community of Opequon was designated as a National Historic District in 2002. Opequon School, which operated from 1884 to 1934, still stands on Glass Spring Road in town. Also on this road is the Second Opequon Presbyterian Church.

The Opequon Quaker Camp (OQC) is a sleep-away, coed summer camp for children ages nine to fourteen; it is located just north of Winchester. It is a part of the Baltimore Yearly Meeting Camps. While it is a Quaker camp, it is open to non-Quaker children and has attracted campers from other regions and countries. Camping trips and activities feature canoeing, backpacking on the Appalachian Trail, rock climbing, and chores.
