= Van Lear, Maryland =

Unincorporated community in Maryland, United States

Coordinates: 39.535557°N 77.752991°W

- Community of Van Lear
- Nicknames: The Manor, VL
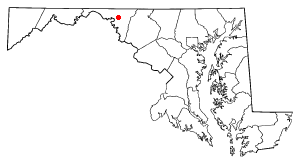
- Location in Maryland (Halfway location [Van Lear is next to Halfway])
- Country: United States
- State: Maryland
- County: Washington
- Founded: 1962

Area
  - Total: 3 sq mi (7.8 km^{2})
- Elevation: 538 ft (164 m)

Population
  - Total: 3,000
- Time zone: UTC-5 (Eastern (EST))
  - Summer (DST): UTC-4 (EDT)
- Elevation is of nearby Hagerstown.

Van Lear is an unincorporated community in Washington County, Maryland, United States. The community is part of the Hagerstown-Martinsburg, MD-WV MSA (Metropolitan Statistical Area). Van Lear is located between Halfway and Williamsport.

== History ==
The Community of Van Lear was started in the late 1960s when a Hagerstown real estate agent, Lee Downey, started to sell tracts of his then rural land to developers. By the 1980s the Hagerstown area started to boom, so Downey made Van Lear Manor and Tammany Manor, the first two suburban neighborhoods in Van Lear.

Today, Van Lear is a diverse residential mix of new and old, modern and historic. Larger modern homes are common in its newer neighborhoods.

== Neighborhoods ==
- Van Lear Manor, the largest and first neighborhood.
- Tammany, another older neighborhood.
- Homewood, a housing complex for senior citizens.
- New Van Lear, a newer, somewhat large neighborhood filled with newer homes.
- Sterling Oaks, a new subdivision with middle to lower income housing.
- Bratton Hill, a small, new neighborhood with newer homes.
- New Tammany, a new middle-class neighborhood.
