= George Washington Hollida House =

Historic house in West Virginia, United States

- U.S. National Register of Historic Places
- U.S. Historic district – Contributing property
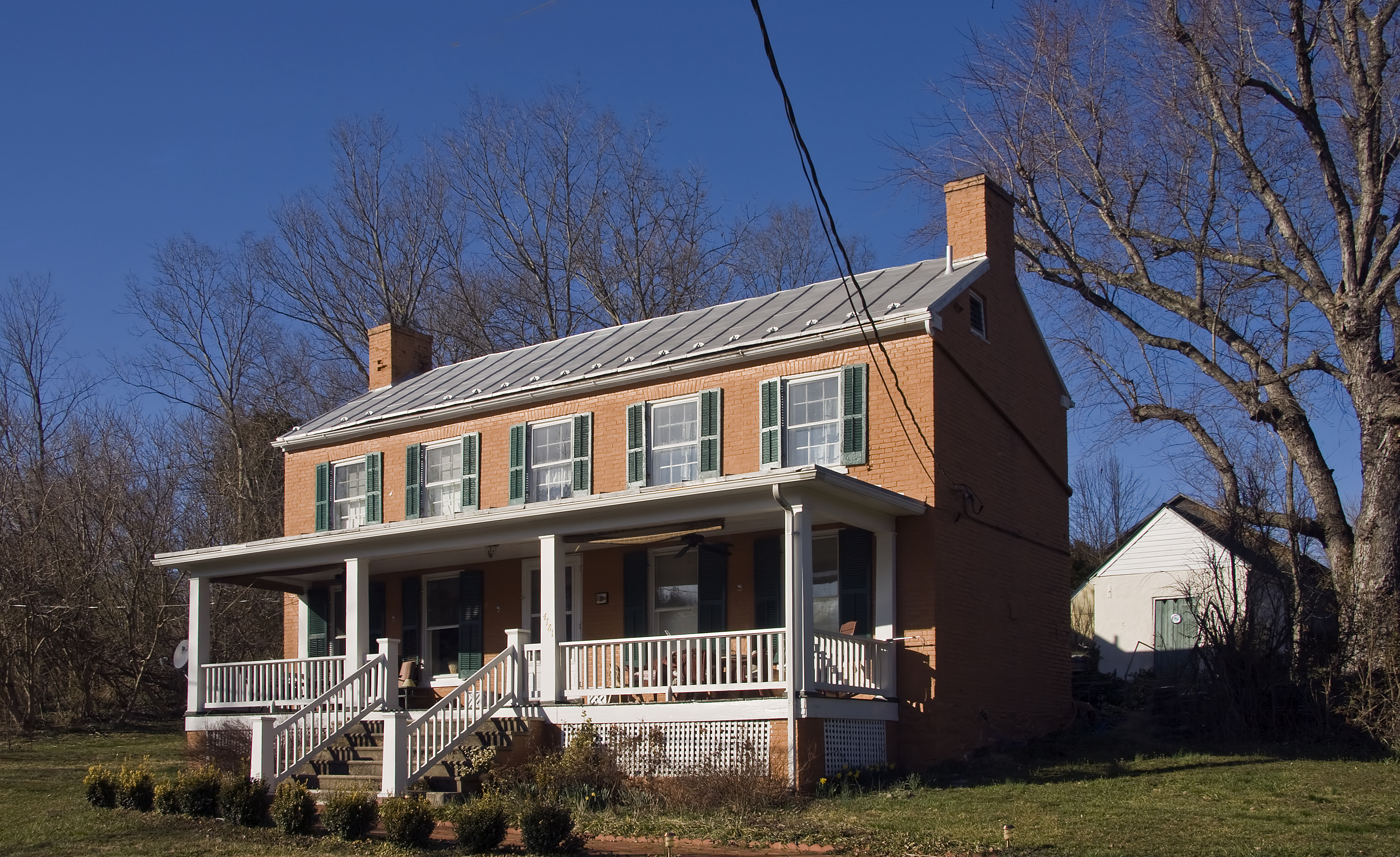

- Location within West Virginia Location within the United States
- Nearest city: Shepherdstown, West Virginia
- Coordinates: 39°29′3″N 77°50′2″W
- Built: 1842
- Architectural style: Greek Revival
- NRHP reference No.: 04000031
- Added to NRHP: February 11, 2004

The George Washington Hollida House is a brick house built c. 1842 near the village of Scrabble, West Virginia, United States. The Hollida (pronounced "Holiday") House is an example of an I-house with a five-bay front and a four-bay ell extending to the rear with Greek Revival detailing. The property includes several outbuildings and a bank barn. The Hollida house is included in the larger Scrabble Historic District, which encompasses the entire village.
