= Abrams Creek (Virginia) =

Stream in Virginia, USA

Abrams Creek Tributary to Opequon Creek
- Location of Abrams Creek mouth Abrams Creek (Virginia) (the United States)

Location
- Country: United States
- State: Virginia
- County: Frederick
- City: Winchester

Physical characteristics
- Source: Gap Run divide
  - location: Approximately 1 mile north=northeast of Round Hill, Virginia
  - coordinates: 39°11′59″N 078°13′21″W
  - elevation: 880 ft (270 m)
- Mouth: Opequon Creek
  - location: about one mile east of Winchester, Virginia
  - coordinates: 39°10′51″N 078°04′29″W
  - elevation: 505 ft (154 m)
- Length: 10.53 mi (16.95 km)
- Basin size: 18.86 square miles (48.8 km^{2})
- Discharge
  - location: Opequon Creek
  - average: 25.46 cu ft/s (0.721 m^{3}/s) at mouth with Opequon Creek

Basin features
- Progression: Opequon Creek → Potomac River → Chesapeake Bay → Atlantic Ocean
- River system: Potomac River
- Tributaries
  - left: Town Run; Ash Hollow Run
  - right: unnamed tributaries
- Bridges: US 50, Round Hill Road, VA 37, Merrimans Lane, Willow Grove Lane, W Jubal Early Drive (x2), Valley Avenue, S Loudoun Street, US 17, I-81, Ralph Shockley Drive, Senseny Road, Greenwood Road, Channing Drive, Valley Mill Road, VA 7

Abrams Creek is an 11.2-mile-long (18.0 km) tributary stream of Opequon Creek in Frederick County and the independent city of Winchester in Virginia. Abrams Creek rises north of Round Hill and flows in a southeasterly direction through Winchester. From Winchester, Abrams Creek flows east into Opequon Creek. The stream was originally known as Abraham's Creek.

== Variant names ==
According to the Geographic Names Information System, it has also been known historically as:

- Abraham's Creek

== Course ==
Abrams Creek rises approximately one-half mile north-northeast of Round Hill, in Frederick County and then flows generally east to join Opequon Creek approximately one mile east of Winchester.

== Watershed ==
Abrams Creek drains 18.86 square miles (48.8 km^{2}) of area, receives about 38.9 in/year of precipitation, has a wetness index of 443.80, and is about 16% forested.

== Tributaries ==
Tributary streams are listed from the source to the mouth.

- Town Run
- Ash Hollow Run

== See also ==
- List of rivers of Virginia
