= Tilhance Creek =

Stream in the U.S. state of West Virginia

Coordinates: 39°35′22″N 78°00′09″W

Tilhance Creek is a 10.4-mile-long (16.7 km) tributary stream of Back Creek in Berkeley County of West Virginia's Eastern Panhandle.

== Headwaters and course ==
Tilhance Creek's source is a spring on the eastern flank of Third Hill Mountain (2172 feet/662 m) in western Berkeley County, West Virginia. From its headwaters, the stream trickles eastward down the mountain's forested slope where it is dammed to create a small farm lake. From the impoundment, Tilhance Creek meanders to the north and is joined by a series of other spring-fed streams flowing off Third Hill Mountain. Tilhance Creek then turns again to the east near the community of Baxter. The stream meanders northward flowing along the western flank of Ferrell Ridge (715 feet/218 m). It is at this location that Tilhance Creek is joined by Whites Run and a small unnamed stream whose source lies near Hedgesville Church. Shortly before the stream reaches West Virginia Route 9, it is joined by Higgins Run and splits to form a small island. After passing under WV 9, Tilhance Creek flows by the community of Johnsontown (also known as Soho). From Johnsontown, Tilhance Creek meanders through a series of rolling hills until its confluence with Back Creek near Allensville.

== Fishing ==
Tilhance Creek is stocked with trout once in February and once every two weeks from March through May by the West Virginia Division of Natural Resources from near Johnsontown at the WV 9 bridge.

== Variant names ==
According to the Geographic Names Information System, Tilhance Creek has been known by a number of names throughout its history. The Board on Geographic Names officially decided upon Tilhance Creek as the stream's name in 1901.

- Tilahanchee Creek
- Tilchances Branch
- Tilchancos Creek
- Tilehance Creek
- Tilhance Branch
- Tillehances Creek

== See also ==
- List of rivers of West Virginia
