= Georgetown, Berkeley County, West Virginia =

Unincorporated community in West Virginia, United States

Georgetown
- Unincorporated community
- Location within the state of West Virginia Georgetown (the United States)
- Coordinates: 39°34′26″N 77°57′45″W
- Country: United States
- State: West Virginia
- County: Berkeley
- Elevation: 472 ft (144 m)
- Time zone: UTC-5 (Eastern (EST))
  - Summer (DST): UTC-4 (EDT)
- GNIS feature ID: 1554546

Georgetown is an unincorporated community in Berkeley County, West Virginia, United States. It is located south of Little Georgetown on County Route 2.
