= Douglas Grove, West Virginia =

Unincorporated community in West Virginia, United States

Douglas Grove
- Unincorporated community
- Location within the state of West Virginia Douglas Grove (the United States)
- Coordinates: 39°25′08″N 77°57′27″W
- Country: United States
- State: West Virginia
- County: Berkeley
- Elevation: 502 ft (153 m)
- Time zone: UTC-5 (Eastern (EST))
  - Summer (DST): UTC-4 (EDT)
- GNIS feature ID: 1554325

Douglas Grove is an unincorporated community in Berkeley County, West Virginia, United States. It is located along County Route 9/16 southeast of Martinsburg.
