= Union Corner, West Virginia =

Union Corner
- Unincorporated community
- Location within the state of West Virginia Union Corner (the United States)
- Coordinates: 39°23′55″N 78°05′08″W
- Country: United States
- State: West Virginia
- County: Berkeley
- Elevation: 745 ft (227 m)
- Time zone: UTC-5 (Eastern (EST))
  - Summer (DST): UTC-4 (EDT)
- GNIS feature ID: 1549963

Union Corner is an unincorporated community in Berkeley County, West Virginia, United States.

Redbud Hollow in Union Corner was listed on the National Register of Historic Places in 1980.
