= Greensburg, West Virginia =

Greensburg
- Unincorporated community
- Location within the state of West Virginia Greensburg (the United States)
- Coordinates: 39°29′03″N 77°53′02″W
- Country: United States
- State: West Virginia
- County: Berkeley
- Elevation: 443 ft (135 m)
- Time zone: UTC-5 (Eastern (EST))
  - Summer (DST): UTC-4 (EDT)
- GNIS feature ID: 1554609

Greensburg is an unincorporated community in Berkeley County, West Virginia, United States. It is located northeast of Martinsburg on County Route 5/3.
