= Tarico Heights, West Virginia =

Tarico Heights
- Unincorporated community
- Location within the state of West Virginia Tarico Heights (the United States)
- Coordinates: 39°19′35″N 78°00′14″W
- Country: United States
- State: West Virginia
- County: Berkeley
- Elevation: 574 ft (175 m)
- Time zone: UTC-5 (Eastern (EST))
  - Summer (DST): UTC-4 (EDT)
- GNIS feature ID: 1547905

Tarico Heights is an unincorporated community on West Virginia Route 51 along Opequon Creek in Berkeley County, West Virginia, United States.
