= Ridgeway, West Virginia =

Ridgeway
- Unincorporated community
- Location within the state of West Virginia Ridgeway (the United States)
- Coordinates: 39°17′50″N 78°04′18″W
- Country: United States
- State: West Virginia
- County: Berkeley
- Elevation: 597 ft (182 m)
- Time zone: UTC-5 (Eastern (EST))
  - Summer (DST): UTC-4 (EDT)
- ZIP code: 25440
- GNIS feature ID: 1545582

Ridgeway is an unincorporated community in Berkeley County, West Virginia, United States. It lies off U.S. Route 11 on Specks Run Road near the Virginia state line.

The community was named after Charles J. Ridgeway, a local merchant. Located near Ridgeway are the James Nathanial Burwell House and George Schlack House, both listed on the National Register of Historic Places.
