= Grubbs Corner, West Virginia =

Grubbs Corner
- Unincorporated community
- Location within the state of West Virginia Grubbs Corner (the United States)
- Coordinates: 39°24′48″N 77°58′24″W
- Country: United States
- State: West Virginia
- County: Berkeley
- Elevation: 541 ft (165 m)
- Time zone: UTC-5 (Eastern (EST))
  - Summer (DST): UTC-4 (EDT)
- GNIS feature ID: 1554620

Grubbs Corner is an unincorporated community in Berkeley County, West Virginia, United States.
