= Berkeley, West Virginia =

Unincorporated community in West Virginia, United States

Berkeley
- Unincorporated community
- Location within the state of West Virginia Berkeley (the United States)
- Coordinates: 39°30′11″N 77°55′38″W
- Country: United States
- State: West Virginia
- County: Berkeley
- Elevation: 482 ft (147 m)
- Time zone: UTC-5 (Eastern (EST))
  - Summer (DST): UTC-4 (EDT)
- GNIS feature ID: 1553866

Berkeley is an unincorporated community in Berkeley County, West Virginia, United States. The community began as Berkeley Station on the Baltimore and Ohio Railroad line, but its name has since been shortened to Berkeley as it has become more of a bedroom community.

The community most likely takes its name from Berkeley County.
