= Johnsontown, Berkeley County, West Virginia =

Johnsontown
- Unincorporated community
- Location within the state of West Virginia Johnsontown (the United States)
- Coordinates: 39°34′42″N 78°02′22″W
- Country: United States
- State: West Virginia
- County: Berkeley
- Elevation: 446 ft (136 m)
- Time zone: UTC-5 (Eastern (EST))
  - Summer (DST): UTC-4 (EDT)
- GNIS feature ID: 1540993

Johnsontown is an unincorporated community at the junction of West Virginia Route 9 and Camp Frame Road along Tilhance Creek in Berkeley County, West Virginia, United States. The town was originally named Soho by settlers after Soho in London's West End. Its name was later changed to Johnstontown and finally Johnsontown.
