= Scrabble, West Virginia =

Historic house in West Virginia, United States

Scrabble
- Unincorporated community
- Location within the state of West Virginia Scrabble (the United States)
- Coordinates: 39°29′1″N 77°49′57″W
- Country: United States
- State: West Virginia
- County: Berkeley
- Elevation: 367 ft (112 m)
- Time zone: UTC-5 (Eastern (EST))
  - Summer (DST): UTC-4 (EDT)
- GNIS feature ID: 1549918

Scrabble is an unincorporated community in Berkeley County, West Virginia, United States. According to the Geographic Names Information System, the community has been known as Hard Scrabble, Hard Scrabble Town, and Hardscrabble throughout its history.

The community most likely was so named on account of treacherous local terrain.

== Scrabble Historic District ==
- Scrabble Historic District
- U.S. National Register of Historic Places
- U.S. Historic district
- Location: Scrabble Rd. and Dam No. 4 Rd., Scrabble, West Virginia
- Area: 62 acres (25 ha)
- Architectural style: Greek Revival
- NRHP reference No.: 06000171
- Added to NRHP: March 22, 2006

Scrabble was listed on the National Register of Historic Places in 2006, with the district extending into Jefferson County. The historic district comprises 62 acres (25 ha) of late 19th century buildings mixed with agricultural lands. The most prominent structures are the 1920 Mount Wesley Methodist Episcopal Church and the 1882 Scrabble School. A number of contemporary I-houses and smaller vernacular houses complete the district. The individually listed George Washington Hollida House is also in the district. The district lies primarily on Scrabble Road and Dam No. 4 Road in Berkeley County, and Silver Spring Road in Jefferson County. The county line is marked by Rocky Marsh Run, which runs through the community.
