= Blairton, West Virginia =

Unincorporated community in West Virginia, United States

Blairton
- Unincorporated community
- Location within the state of West Virginia Blairton (the United States)
- Coordinates: 39°27′09″N 77°55′13″W
- Country: United States
- State: West Virginia
- County: Berkeley
- Elevation: 436 ft (133 m)
- Time zone: UTC-5 (Eastern (EST))
  - Summer (DST): UTC-4 (EDT)
- GNIS feature ID: 1553922

Blairton is an unincorporated community on Opequon Creek located east of Martinsburg in Berkeley County, West Virginia, United States. Blairton was originally named Opequan Station because of its location on the Opequon along the railroad.

== Climate ==
Blairton lies in the transition zone between humid subtropical (Köppen Cfa) and humid continental climatic zones (Köppen Dfa), with four distinct seasons. Winters are cool to cold, with a January daily mean temperature of 30.9 °F (−0.6 °C) and an average seasonal snowfall of 26.6 inches (68 cm), while summers are hot and humid with a July daily mean temperature of 74.7 °F (23.7 °C) and 27 days of 90 °F (32 °C)+ readings annually. Precipitation is moderate, with winter being the driest period and May thru July the wettest. Extreme temperatures range from −18 °F (−28 °C) on January 21, 1994 up to 112 °F (44 °C) on July 11, 1936.
