= Bessemer, West Virginia =

Unincorporated community in West Virginia, United States

Bessemer
- Unincorporated community
- Location within the state of West Virginia Bessemer (the United States)
- Coordinates: 39°30′52″N 77°55′47″W
- Country: United States
- State: West Virginia
- County: Berkeley
- Elevation: 417 ft (127 m)
- Time zone: UTC-5 (Eastern (EST))
  - Summer (DST): UTC-4 (EDT)
- GNIS feature ID: 1553874

Bessemer is an unincorporated community on U.S. Route 11 in Berkeley County, West Virginia, United States.
