= Wynkoop Spring, West Virginia =

Wynkoop Spring
- Unincorporated community
- Location within the state of West Virginia Wynkoop Spring (the United States)
- Coordinates: 39°26′10″N 77°51′39″W
- Country: United States
- State: West Virginia
- County: Berkeley
- Elevation: 463 ft (141 m)
- Time zone: UTC-5 (Eastern (EST))
  - Summer (DST): UTC-4 (EDT)
- GNIS feature ID: 1727813

Wynkoop Spring is an unincorporated community in Berkeley County, West Virginia, United States. Wynkoop Spring lies on the border with Jefferson County.
