= Pecktonville, Maryland =

Unincorporated community in Maryland, United States

- Unincorporated community
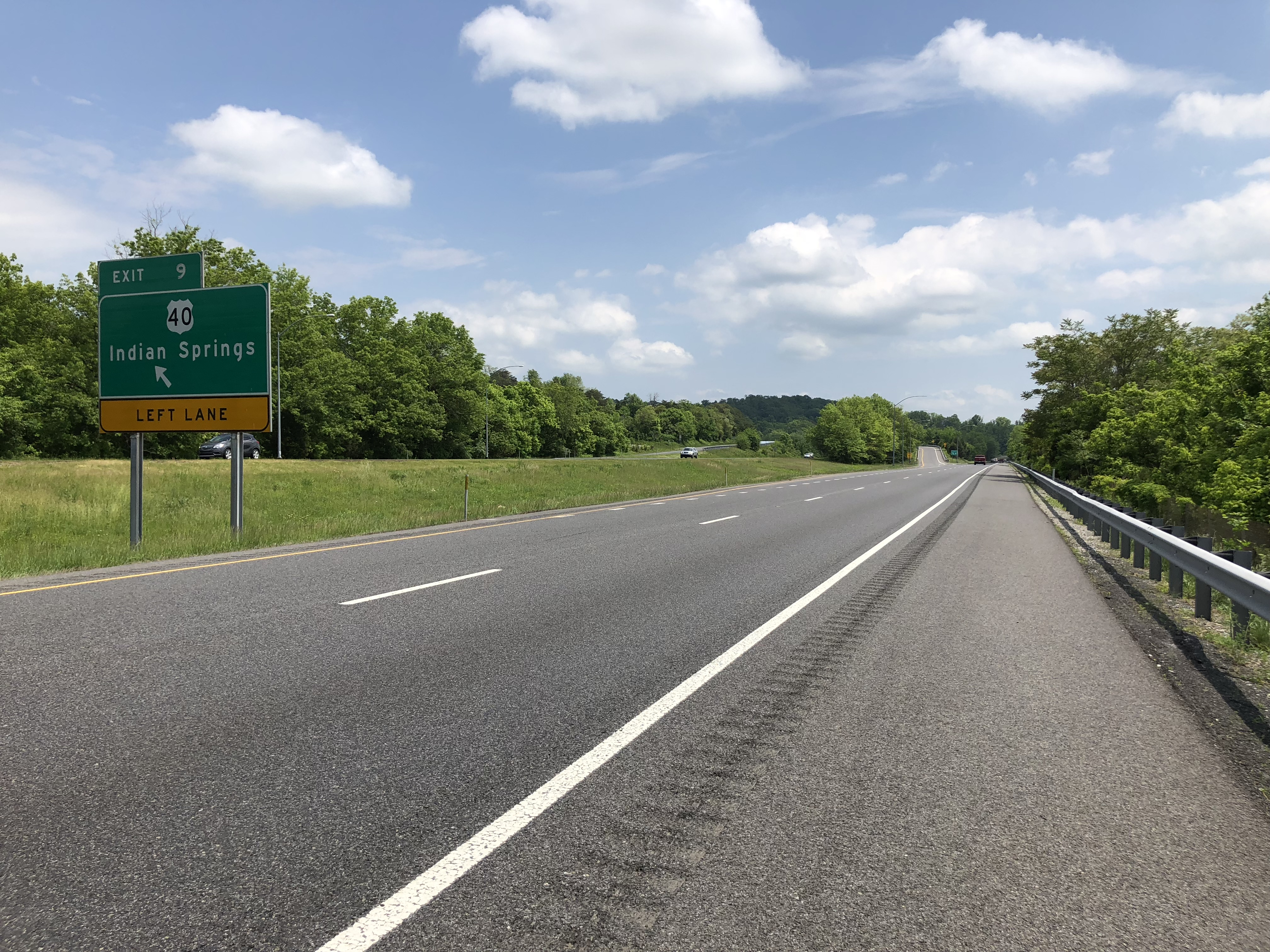
- I-70's exit for US 40 in Pecktonville

- Location within Maryland Location within the United States
- Coordinates: 39°39′58″N 78°02′53″W
- Country: United States
- State: Maryland
- County: Washington

Area
  - Total: 0.59 sq mi (1.52 km^{2})
  - Land: 0.59 sq mi (1.52 km^{2})
  - Water: 0 sq mi (0.00 km^{2})
- Elevation: 463 ft (141 m)

Population (2020)
  - Total: 164
  - Density: 278.6/sq mi (107.56/km^{2})
- Time zone: UTC−5 (Eastern (EST))
  - Summer (DST): UTC−4 (EDT)
- ZIP code: 21711
- Area codes: 240 & 301
- GNIS feature ID: 2583670

Pecktonville is an unincorporated community and census-designated place in Washington County, Maryland, United States. Its population was 167 as of the 2010 census.

In 1921 Pecktonville was the destination of the Vagabonds, a group of men which took camping trips over ten years and which at the time consisted of inventor Thomas Edison and industrialists Henry Ford and Harvey S. Firestone along with their guest the sitting US president Warren G. Harding.

== Geography ==
According to the U.S. Census Bureau, the community has an area of 0.589 square miles (1.53 km^{2}), all land.

== Demographics ==
Historical population
Census	Pop.	Note	%±
2020	164		—
U.S. Decennial Census
