= Nipetown, West Virginia =

Nipetown
- Unincorporated community
- Location within the state of West Virginia Nipetown (the United States)
- Coordinates: 39°31′53″N 77°55′38″W
- Country: United States
- State: West Virginia
- County: Berkeley
- Elevation: 430 ft (130 m)
- Time zone: UTC-5 (Eastern (EST))
  - Summer (DST): UTC-4 (EDT)
- GNIS feature ID: 1555227

Nipetown is an unincorporated community in Berkeley County, West Virginia, United States.
