= North Mountain, West Virginia =

North Mountain
- Unincorporated community
- Location within the state of West Virginia North Mountain (the United States)
- Coordinates: 39°33′48″N 77°58′49″W
- Country: United States
- State: West Virginia
- County: Berkeley
- Elevation: 538 ft (164 m)
- Time zone: UTC-5 (Eastern (EST))
  - Summer (DST): UTC-4 (EDT)
- GNIS feature ID: 1555235

North Mountain is an unincorporated community in Berkeley County, West Virginia, United States. It takes its name from North Mountain, which lies to its west. The community of North Mountain is located on West Virginia Route 901 northeast of Hedgesville.
