= Little Georgetown, West Virginia =

Little Georgetown
- Unincorporated community
- Location within the state of West Virginia Little Georgetown (the United States)
- Coordinates: 39°35′6″N 77°57′4″W
- Country: United States
- State: West Virginia
- County: Berkeley
- Elevation: 397 ft (121 m)
- Time zone: UTC-5 (Eastern (EST))
  - Summer (DST): UTC-4 (EDT)
- GNIS feature ID: 1554963

Little Georgetown is a small unincorporated community along the Potomac River in Berkeley County, West Virginia, United States. It is located northeast of Hedgesville and Georgetown.
