= Tuscarora Creek (Opequon Creek tributary) =

Watercourse in West Virginia, US

Coordinates: 39°26′46″N 77°55′37″W

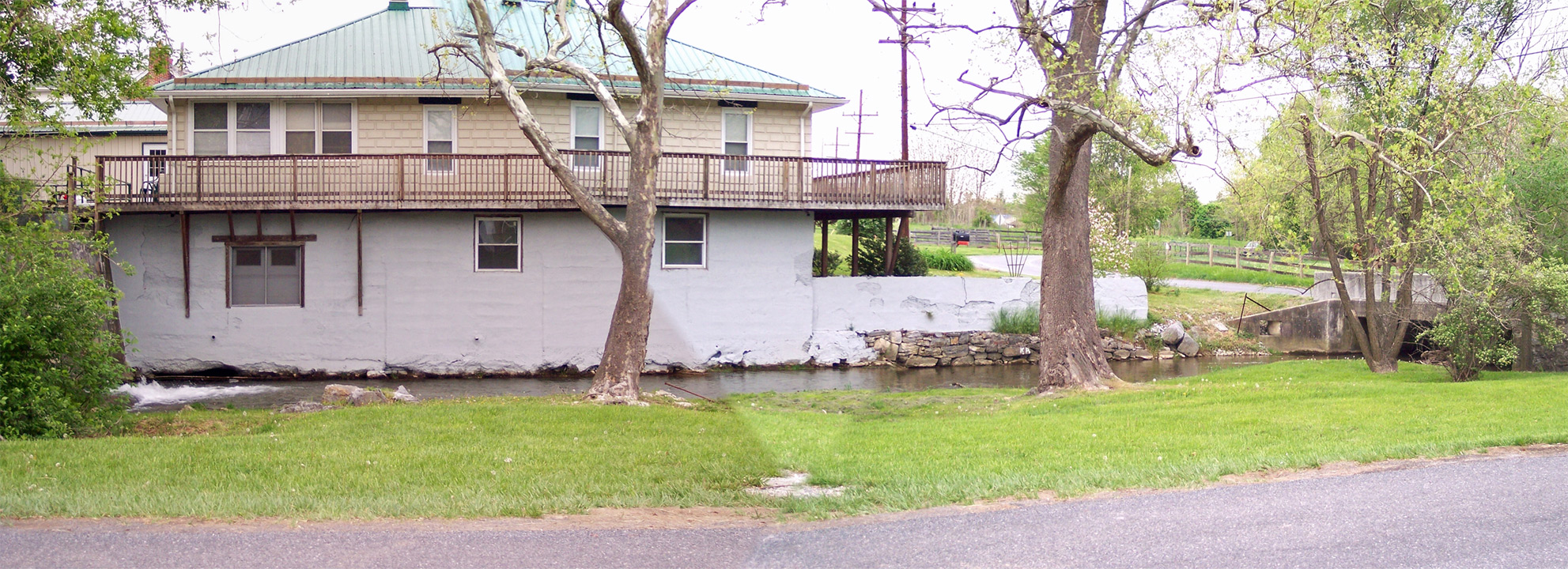
Tuscarora Creek near Martinsburg, West Virginia

Tuscarora Creek is an 11.4-mile-long (18.3 km) tributary of Opequon Creek in Berkeley County, West Virginia, which drains into the Potomac River in the Chesapeake Bay watershed.

Located in the tip of West Virignia's Eastern Panhandle, Tuscarora Creek flows through the city of Martinsburg before draining into Opequon Creek near the Van Metre Ford Bridge. The stream's headwaters are on the eastern flanks of North Mountain, upstream from Poor House Farm Park.

The creek was named after the Tuscarora Indians.

== See also ==
- List of West Virginia rivers
