= Bedington, West Virginia =

Unincorporated community in West Virginia, United States

Bedington
- Unincorporated community
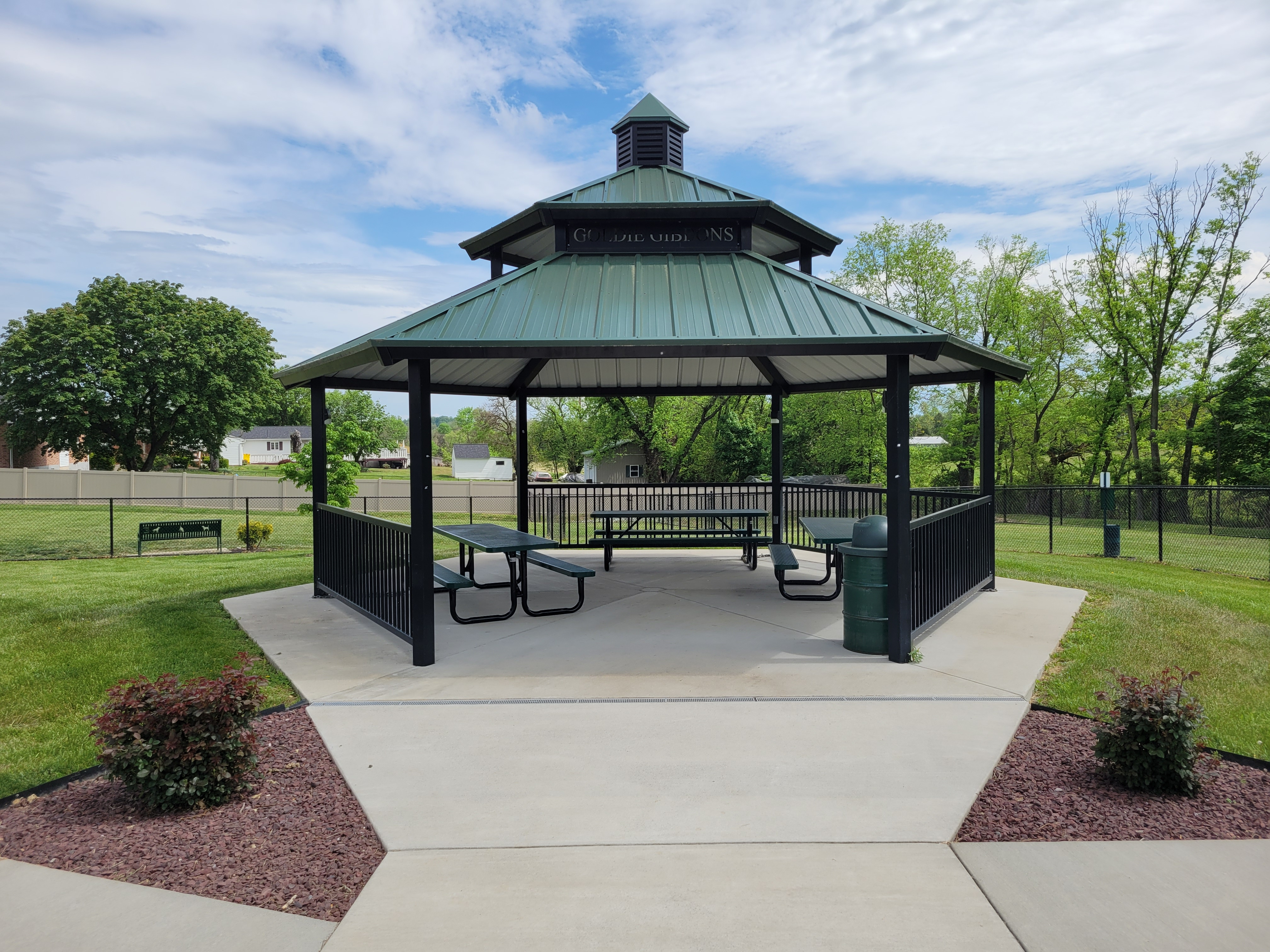
- Gazebo at Goldie Gibbons Dog Park

- Location within the state of West Virginia Bedington (the United States)
- Coordinates: 39°31′20″N 77°54′20″W
- Country: United States
- State: West Virginia
- County: Berkeley
- Elevation: 384 ft (117 m)
- Time zone: UTC-5 (Eastern (EST))
  - Summer (DST): UTC-4 (EDT)
- GNIS feature ID: 1535469

Bedington is an unincorporated community on Hoke Run, near its confluence with Opequon Creek, in Berkeley County, West Virginia, United States. It is located east of Hainesville on County Route 5. According to the Geographic Names Information System, Bedington has also been known as Beddington, Bedenton, and The Lick.

The community derives its name from Colonel Bedinger, an early settler.
