= Baxter, Berkeley County, West Virginia =

Unincorporated community in West Virginia, United States

Baxter
- Unincorporated community
- Location within the state of West Virginia Baxter (the United States)
- Coordinates: 39°33′27″N 78°04′39″W
- Country: United States
- State: West Virginia
- County: Berkeley
- Elevation: 604 ft (184 m)
- Time zone: UTC-5 (Eastern (EST))
  - Summer (DST): UTC-4 (EDT)
- GNIS feature ID: 1553812

Baxter is an unincorporated community in Berkeley County, West Virginia, United States. The community lies near Tilhance Creek.
