= Mercersville, Maryland =

- Unincorporated community
- Location within Maryland Location within the United States
- Coordinates: 39°30′02″N 77°46′12″W
- Country: United States
- State: Maryland
- County: Washington

Area
  - Total: 0.32 sq mi (0.84 km^{2})
  - Land: 0.32 sq mi (0.84 km^{2})
  - Water: 0 sq mi (0.00 km^{2})
- Elevation: 351 ft (107 m)

Population (2020)
  - Total: 91
  - Density: 282.0/sq mi (108.88/km^{2})
- Time zone: UTC−5 (Eastern (EST))
  - Summer (DST): UTC−4 (EDT)
- ZIP code: 21782
- Area codes: 301, 240
- GNIS feature ID: 2583656

Mercersville, popularly known as Taylor's Landing, is an unincorporated community and census-designated place in Washington County, Maryland, United States. Its population was 130 as of the 2010 census. Mercersville lies at an elevation of 341 feet (104 m).

== History ==
The community of Mercersville, more popularly known today as Taylor's Landing, is located on the third land patent surveyed in what would eventually become Washington County, Maryland. Maj. Edward Sprigg's "Sprigg's Delight" would eventually encompass much of the land from here to near Sharpsburg, but the original is noted in the 1734 survey as "below the fording place of Charles Anderson." Charles Anderson received a patent in Terrapin Neck on the Virginia side of the Potomac this same year. A court order for a new road in 1838 refers to the location as "Zook's Landing." Since the C&O Canal was still under construction at the time and had only reached the area a few years earlier, it is thought this is a reference to the area being used by boatmen of the earlier Patomack Company. Further evidence pointing to a Patowmack Company port is that Henry Zook, operator of Zook's Landing, died in 1825, before the canal was incorporated. He is buried at Salem Lutheran Church cemetery at nearby Bakersville. There remains today an ancient iron ring affixed to the bedrock between the boat ramps at Taylor's Landing, long rumored to be a relic of the Patomack Company days. After the establishment of the C&O Canal the area became locally important as both a shipping and receiving point as well as the home port of many boatmen who lived nearby. The name Mercersville was given in honor of Charles F. Mercer, the first president of the C&O Canal Company. The popular name of Taylor's Landing is credited to John William "Jack" Taylor (1868–1948) who operated a store adjacent to the wharf for many years. During the mid to late 19th century, many of the residents of Bakersville 1 1/2 miles away are listed as employed on the canal. Closer, on a now lost road between Bakersville and Mercersville was the community of Dogtown. Today's Tommytown road skirts the edge of historic Dogtown, passing the remaining four of what was originally more than ten houses populated mostly by Canal workers and boatmen. The potomac River at Taylor's Landing has long been a favorite fishing spot, evidenced by the several ancient native stone structures known locally as "fish pots" still visible in the river. During the mid-20th century the area became popular for weekend cottages as well as a Rod & Gun Club, now a multi-unit residence at 1700 Taylor's Landing road. In 1972 the National Park Service was authorized to expand the boundaries of the C&O Canal park and most of these small cabins were bought and eventually razed. Along with both earlier and later homes, several examples of these weekend cottages remain in near original form at Taylor's Landing, providing a glimpse at a later chapter to the history of this place. Today Taylor's Landing, aka Mercersville, is a rural village of mostly single family residential homes and primarily known for the C&O Canal access site and Potomac River boat ramp located here.

== Geography ==
According to the U.S. Census Bureau, the community has an area of 0.323 square miles (0.84 km^{2}), all land.

== Demographics ==
Historical population
Census	Pop.	Note	%±
2020	91		—
U.S. Decennial Census
