= Winebrenners Crossroad, West Virginia =

Winebrenners Crossroad
- Unincorporated community
- Location within the state of West Virginia Winebrenners Crossroad (the United States)
- Coordinates: 39°25′41″N 77°53′44″W
- Country: United States
- State: West Virginia
- County: Berkeley
- Elevation: 492 ft (150 m)
- Time zone: UTC-5 (Eastern (EST))
  - Summer (DST): UTC-4 (EDT)
- GNIS feature ID: 1556007

Winebrenners Crossroad is a small unincorporated community along the Warm Springs Road southeast of Martinsburg in Berkeley County, West Virginia, United States. It is centered on the intersection or "crossroad" of the Warm Springs Road with Van Clevesville Road and Winebrenner Road. The Crossroad area is the site of the 18th century Strayer-Couchman House listed on the National Register of Historic Places.
