= Baker Heights, West Virginia =

Unincorporated community in West Virginia, United States

Baker Heights
- Unincorporated community
- Location within the state of West Virginia Baker Heights (the United States)
- Coordinates: 39°25′24″N 77°55′31″W
- Country: United States
- State: West Virginia
- County: Berkeley
- Elevation: 456 ft (139 m)
- Time zone: UTC-5 (Eastern (EST))
  - Summer (DST): UTC-4 (EDT)
- GNIS feature ID: 1535146

Baker Heights is an unincorporated community near Opequon Creek in Berkeley County in the U.S. state of West Virginia. Located on West Virginia Route 9 southeast of Martinsburg, Baker Heights is the site of the Martinsburg Veterans Affairs Medical Center.
