= Vanville, West Virginia =

Vanville
- Unincorporated community
- Location within the state of West Virginia Vanville (the United States)
- Coordinates: 39°22′47″N 77°58′47″W
- Country: United States
- State: West Virginia
- County: Berkeley
- Elevation: 564 ft (172 m)
- Time zone: UTC-5 (Eastern (EST))
  - Summer (DST): UTC-4 (EDT)
- ZIP codes: 25401-25405
- Area code: 304
- GNIS feature ID: 1548629

Vanville is an unincorporated community in the south-east portion of Berkeley County, West Virginia, United States. The center of the community of Vanville is at the intersection of Airport Rd, Strobridge Rd, Near Bethel's Way, and Classic Vanville Rd.

The community is named after the Vanville Church of Christ. The church is located on the corner of Classic Vanville Rd and Airport Rd. Part of the Eastern WV Regional Airport is located in Vanville.
