= Berkeley County, West Virginia =

County in West Virginia, United States

Berkeley County
- County
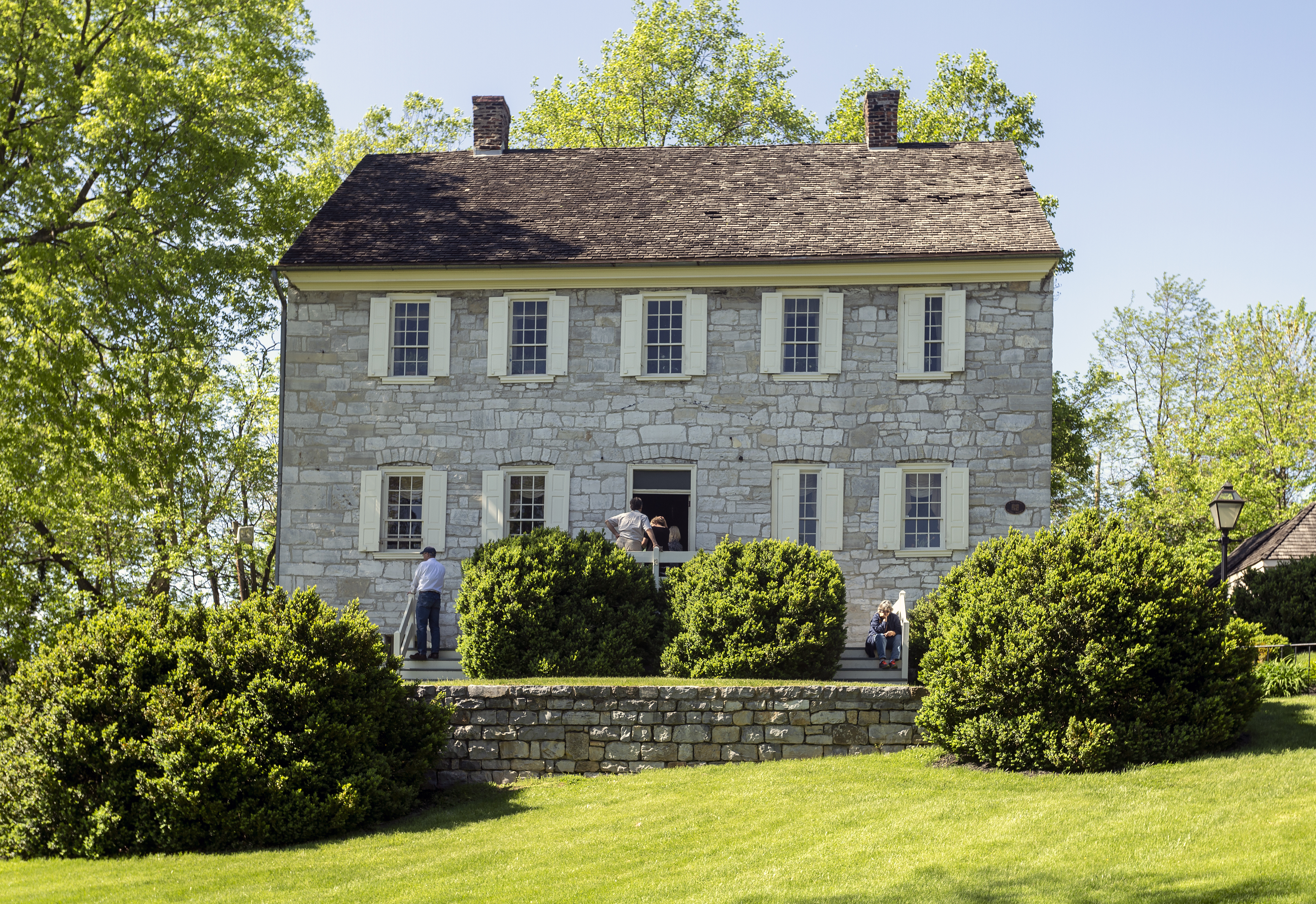
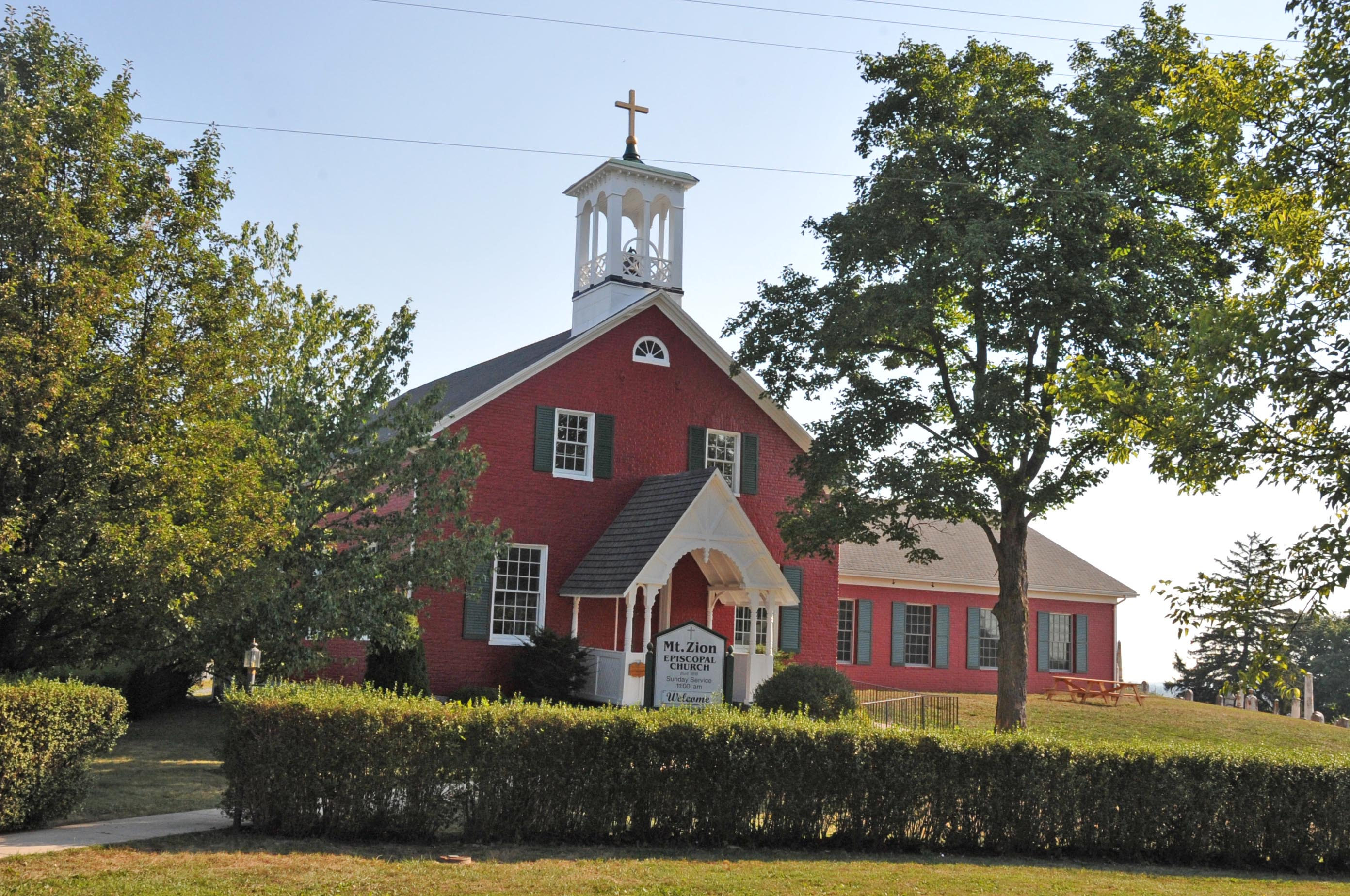
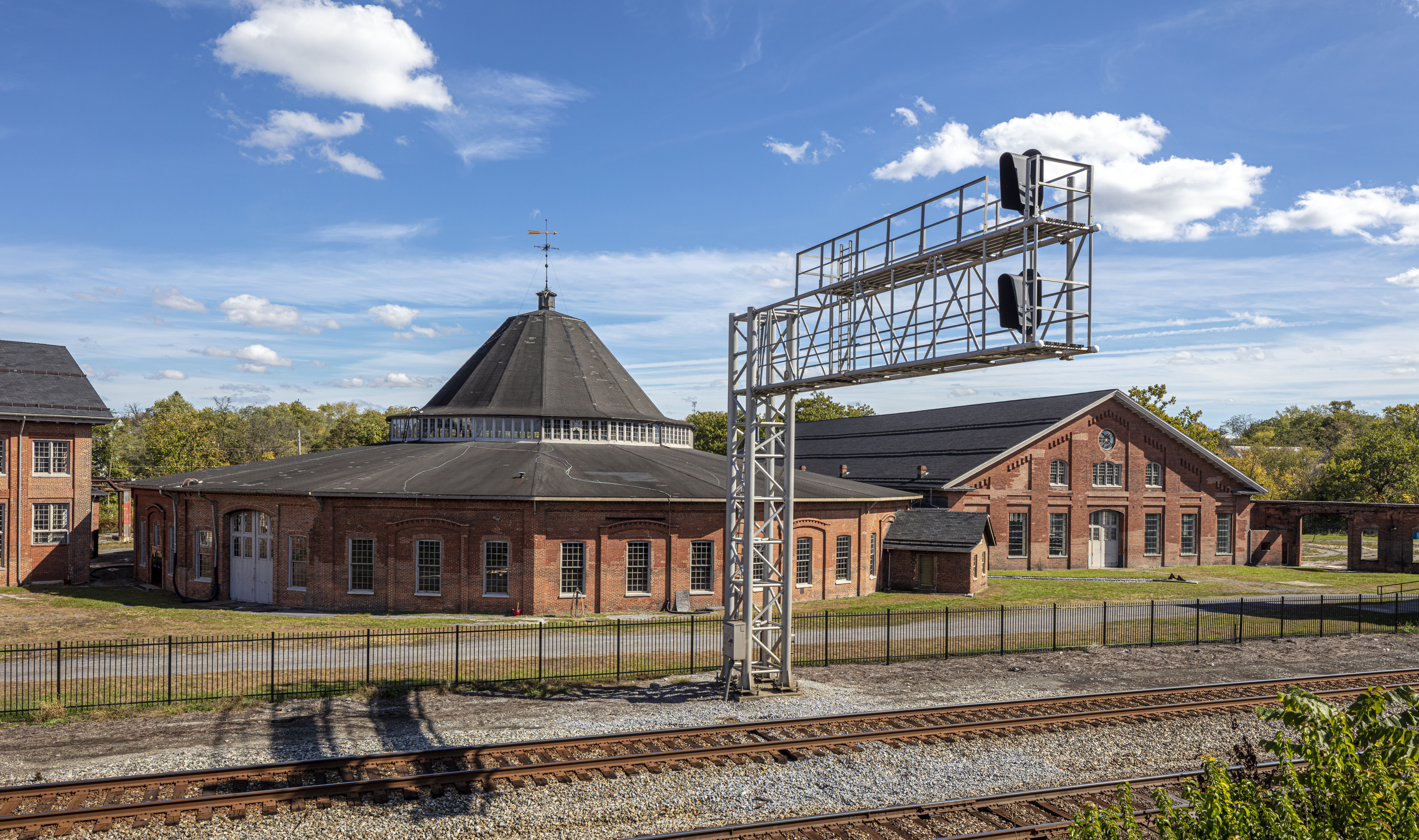
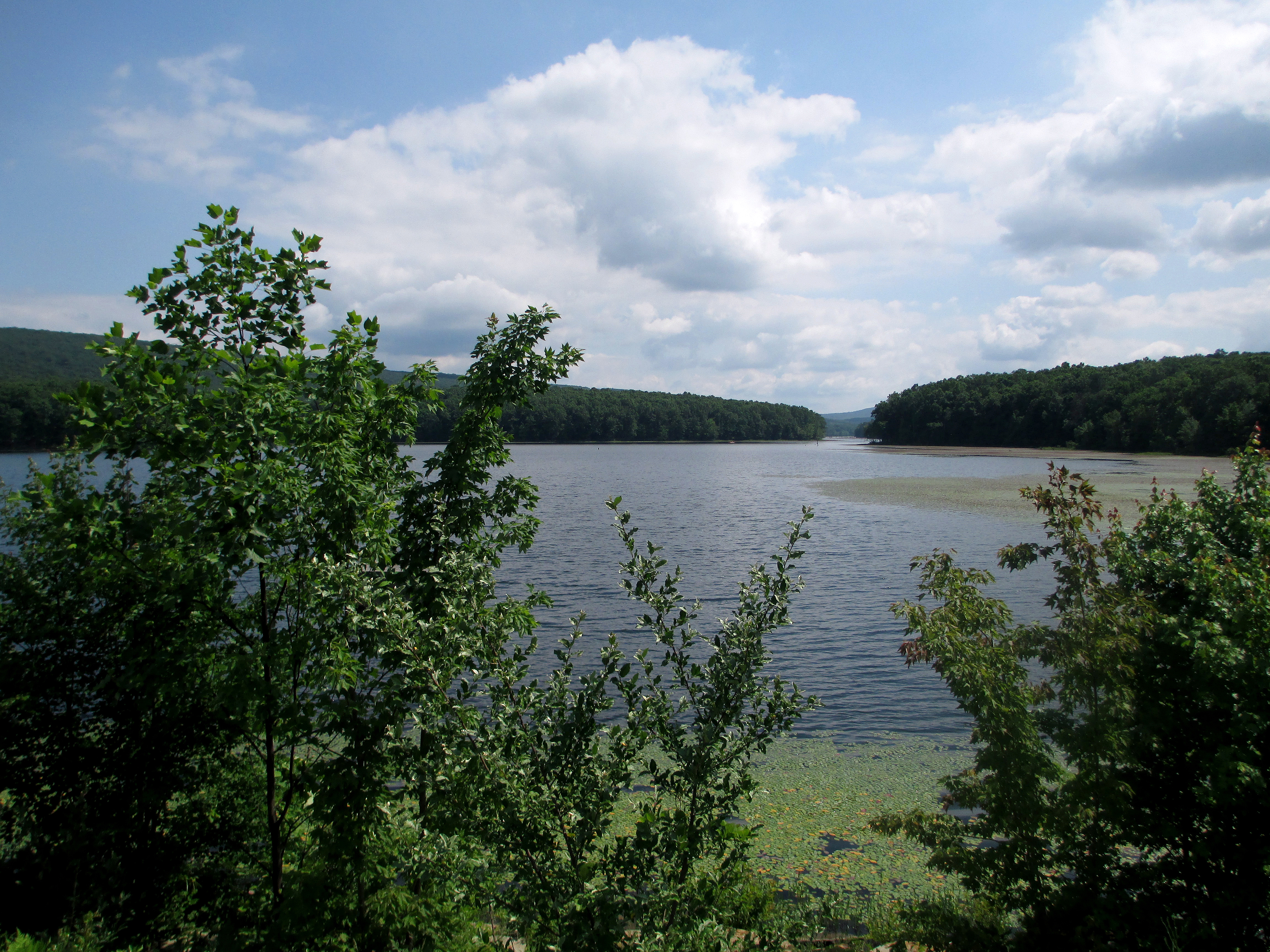
- Berkeley County Courthouse Adam Stephen House Hedgesville Historic District Baltimore and Ohio Railroad Martinsburg Shops Sleepy Creek Wildlife Management Area

- Seal

- Location of Berkeley County in West Virginia

- West Virginia's location within the U.S.
- Country: United States
- State: West Virginia
- Founded: May 15, 1772
- Seat: Martinsburg
- and largest city

Government
  - Commission President: Jim Whitacre (R)
  - County Commission: James Barnhart; H.D. Boyd (R); Steve Catlett (R)

Area
  - Total: 321.56 sq mi (832.8 km^{2})
  - Land: 321.15 sq mi (831.8 km^{2})
  - Water: 0.41 sq mi (1.1 km^{2}) 0.5%
  - Rank: 40th

Population (2020)
  - Total: 122,076
  - Estimate (2025): 139,522 ▲
  - Rank: 2nd
  - Density: 380.12/sq mi (146.77/km^{2})
- Time zone: UTC−5 (Eastern)
  - Summer (DST): UTC−4 (EDT)
- Area codes: 304, 681
- Congressional district: 2nd
- Senate districts: 15th, 16th
- House of Delegates districts: 90th-97th
- Website: http://www.berkeleywv.org/

Berkeley County is located in the Shenandoah Valley in the eastern panhandle region of West Virginia in the United States. The county is part of the Hagerstown–Martinsburg metropolitan area. As of the 2020 census, the county population was 122,076, making it the second-most populous of West Virginia's 55 counties, behind Kanawha County. The City of Martinsburg is the county seat.

== History ==
Created on May 15, 1772, by an act of the House of Burgesses from the northern third of Frederick County when it was part of Virginia, Berkeley County went on to become West Virginia's second-oldest county after that state seceded from Virginia in 1863 during the Civil War. At the time of the county's formation, Berkeley County comprised areas that now are part of present-day Jefferson and Morgan counties in West Virginia.

Most historians believe the county was named for Norborne Berkeley, Baron de Botetourt (1718–1770), Colonial Governor of Virginia from 1768 to 1770. West Virginia's Blue Book, for example, indicates Berkeley County was named in his honor. He served as a colonel in England's North Gloucestershire militia in 1761, and represented that division of the county in Parliament until he was made a peer in 1764. Having incurred heavy gambling debts, he solicited a government appointment and in July 1768 was made Governor of Virginia. In 1769, he reluctantly dissolved the House of Burgesses after it adopted resolutions that opposed Parliament's replacement of requisitions with parliamentary taxes as a means of generating revenue and a requirement for accused American criminals to be sent to England for trial.

Despite his differences with the House of Burgesses, Berkeley was well respected by the colonists, especially after he sent Parliament letters encouraging them to repeal the taxes. When Parliament refused to rescind them, Governor Berkeley requested to be recalled. In appreciation of his efforts, the colonists erected a monument to his memory in Williamsburg, and two counties were later named in his honor: Berkeley in present-day West Virginia and Botetourt in Virginia.

Other historians claim Berkeley County may have been named in honor of Sir William Berkeley (1610–1677), who was born near London, graduated from Oxford University in 1629 and was appointed Governor of Virginia in 1642. He served as Governor until 1652 and was reappointed Governor in 1660. Berkeley presided over the colony during Bacon’s Rebellion of 1676, and was called back to England the following year.

=== Early settlers ===
According to missionary reports, several thousand Hurons occupied present-day West Virginia, including the eastern panhandle region, during the late 16th and early 17th centuries. During the 17th century, the Iroquois Confederacy (then consisting of the Mohawk, Onondaga, Cayuga, Oneida, and Seneca tribes) drove the Hurons from the state. The Iroquois Confederacy was headquartered in New York and was not interested in occupying present-day West Virginia. Instead, they used it as a hunting ground during the spring and summer months.

During the early 18th century, West Virginia's eastern panhandle region was inhabited by the Tuscarora. They eventually migrated northward into New York and, in 1712, became the sixth nation formally admitted into the Iroquois Confederacy. The eastern panhandle region was also used as a hunting ground by several other Indian tribes, including the Shawnee (then known as the Shawanese) who resided near present-day Winchester, Virginia and Moorefield, West Virginia until 1754 when they migrated into Ohio. The Mingo, who resided in the Tygart Valley and along the Ohio River in present-day West Virginia's northern panhandle region, and the Delaware, who lived in present-day eastern Pennsylvania, New Jersey and Delaware, but had several autonomous settlements as far south as present-day Braxton County, also used the area as a hunting ground.

Following the French and Indian War, the Mingo retreated to their homes along the banks of the Ohio River and were rarely seen in the eastern panhandle region. Although the French and Indian War was over, many Indians continued to view the British as a threat to their sovereignty and continued to fight them. In the summer of 1763, Pontiac, an Ottawa chief, led raids on key British forts in the Great Lakes region. Shawnee chief Keigh-tugh-qua, also known as Cornstalk, led similar attacks on western Virginia settlements, starting with attacks in present-day Greenbrier County and extending northward to Berkeley Springs, and into the northern Shenandoah Valley. By the end of July, Indians had destroyed or captured all British forts west of the Alleghenies except Fort Detroit, Fort Pitt, and Fort Niagara. The uprisings were ended on August 6, 1763, when British forces, under the command of Colonel Henry Bouquet, defeated Delaware and Shawnee forces at Bushy Run in western Pennsylvania.

During the American Revolutionary War (1775–1783), the Mingo and Shawnee, headquartered at Chillicothe, allied themselves with the British. In 1777, a party of 350 Wyandots, Shawnees, and Mingos, armed by the British, attacked Fort Henry, near present-day Wheeling. Nearly half of the soldiers manning the fort were killed in the three-day assault. The Indians then left the area celebrating their victory. For the remainder of the war, smaller raiding parties of Mingo, Shawnee, and other Indian tribes repelled settlers throughout northern and eastern West Virginia. As a result, European settlement throughout present-day West Virginia, including the eastern panhandle, came to a virtual standstill until the war's conclusion.

Following the war, the Mingo and Shawnee, once again allied with the losing side, returned to their homes. As the number of settlers in present-day West Virginia began to grow, both the Mingo and Shawnee moved further inland, leaving their traditional hunting ground to the white settlers.

=== 17th-century European explorers ===
In 1670, John Lederer, a German physician and explorer employed by Sir William Berkeley, colonial governor of Virginia, became the first European to set foot in present-day Berkeley County; their safety was not guaranteed. John Howard and his son also passed through present-day Berkeley County a few years later, and discovered the valley of the South Branch Potomac River at Green Spring.

=== The 18th century ===
The next known explorer to traverse the county was John Van Meter (1683–1745) in the 1730s. He came across the Potomac River, at what is now known as Shepherdstown, then he made his way to the South Branch Potomac River. In 1726, Morgan Morgan moved from Delaware and founded the first permanent English settlement of record in West Virginia on Mill Creek near the present-day Bunker Hill in Berkeley County. The state of West Virginia erected a monument in Bunker Hill commemorating the event, and placed a marker at Morgan's grave, which is located in a cemetery near the park. Morgan Morgan and his wife, Catherine Garretson, had eight children. His son, Zackquill Morgan, later founded present-day Morgantown.

In 1730, John Van Meter, with his brother Isaac (1692–1757), secured a patent for 40,000 acres (160 km^{2}) at the South Branch Potomac River, much of it in present-day Berkeley County, from Virginia's Colonial Lieutenant Governor William Gooch. Part of the land was sold the following year to Hans Yost Heydt, also known as Joist Hite or Jost Hite. In 1732, Heydt (Hite) and fifteen families set out from York, Pennsylvania, passed through present-day Berkeley County, and settled near present-day Winchester, Virginia. In 1744, Isaac Van Meter moved to a site near Moorefield — then part of Hampshire County, but now in Hardy County (see Fort Pleasant) — where he was later killed by Indians. (His brother John settled and died in Winchester, Virginia.)

In 1748, George Washington, then just sixteen years old, surveyed present-day Berkeley County for Thomas Fairfax, 6th Lord Fairfax of Cameron. He later returned to Bath (Berkeley Springs), West Virginia several times over the next several years with his half-brother, Lawrence, who was ill and hoped that the warm springs might improve his health. The springs, and their rumored medicinal benefits, attracted numerous Native Americans as well as Europeans to the area.

=== The 19th century ===
Berkeley County was reduced in size twice during the 19th century. On January 8, 1801, Jefferson County was formed out of the county's eastern section. Then, on February 9, 1820, Morgan County was formed out of the county's western section and parts of Hampshire County.

Berkeley County was strategically important to both the North and the South during the American Civil War (from 1861 to 1865). The county, and Martinsburg, its seat, lay at the northern edge of the Shenandoah Valley, and Martinsburg was important because the main line of the Baltimore and Ohio Railroad ran through it. The B&O was valuable to both armies for moving men and materiel. Increasing Martinsburg's strategic value was its proximity to the United States Arsenal and Armory at Harpers Ferry. Control over Martinsburg changed hands many times during the war, especially prior to the Battle of Gettysburg in July 1863. After Gettysburg, the city remained mostly under Union control.

About 75% of Berkeley County's residents were loyal to the South during the American Civil War. Confederate fervor was even more evident with military enlistment, at least about 80% of soldiers fought for the South. There were at least eleven companies of soldiers recruited from the county: at least nine for the Confederate Army but only two for the Union Army. In addition, the local militia sided with the Confederacy.

The Confederate units consisted of the following: Chew's Battery Virginia Horse Artillery (a.k.a. Capt. James W. Thomson's & Capt. John W. Carter's Co.), Capt. Osmond B. Taylor's Co. Virginia Light Artillery, Wise Artillery (Co. B, 1st Regiment Virginia Light Artillery), Co. F Clark's Co (12th Virginia Cavalry), Co. A Wildcat Cavalry (11th Virginia Cavalry), Co. B Berkeley Troop (1st Virginia Cavalry), Co. F Shepherdstown Troop (1st Virginia Cavalry), Co. D Berkeley Border Guards (2nd Virginia Infantry), Co. E Hedgesville Blues (2nd Virginia Infantry), and 67th Regiment Virginia Militia. It is also believed that soldiers from Berkeley County participated in other Confederate units as well, such as the 7th Virginia Cavalry, whose Co. F and G recruited out of neighboring Hampshire and Jefferson Counties.

The Union units consisted of Co. C 3rd Regiment, West Virginia Cavalry, and Company B First Regiment, (West) Virginia Volunteers.

Yet it was (then-Colonel) Stonewall Jackson who wrote to Robert E. Lee, "... I regret to say that in Berkeley things are growing worse, and that the threats from Union men are calculated to curb the expression of Southern feeling."

A member of the Stonewall Brigade also wrote, "We left Winchester the first of this week [in June, 1861] and came to Berkeley County, the meanest Abolition hole on the face of the earth, Martinsburg especially."

At least six hundred men from Berkeley County served in either the Confederate Army or the Union Army. When the vote for separation from Confederate Virginia was held, the majority voted for the Union creation of the state of West Virginia.

Berkeley County was also the home of Maria Isabella "Belle" Boyd, a famous spy for the Confederacy.

=== Joining West Virginia ===
During the American Civil War (1861–1865), Berkeley and Jefferson counties, both lying on the Potomac River east of the mountains, with the consent of the Reorganized Government of Virginia, voted in favor of annexation to West Virginia in 1863. The occupying Federal troops in the area ensured the desired outcome. Many voters absent in the Confederate Army when the vote was taken refused to acknowledge the transfer upon their return. The Virginia General Assembly repealed the Act of Secession and in 1866 brought suit against West Virginia, asking the court to declare the counties a part of Virginia. Meanwhile, Congress, on March 10, 1866, passed a joint resolution recognizing the transfer. In 1871, the U.S. Supreme Court decided Virginia v. West Virginia, upholding the secession of West Virginia, including Berkeley and Jefferson counties, from Virginia.

In 1863, West Virginia's counties were divided into civil townships, with the intention of encouraging local government. This proved impractical in the heavily rural state, and in 1872 the townships were converted into magisterial districts. Berkeley County was divided into seven districts: Arden, Falling Waters, Gerrardstown, Hedgesville, Martinsburg, Mill Creek, and Opequon. (Note: Over time, Falling Water and Gerardstown came to be spelled "Falling Waters" and "Gerrardstown", but both spellings were in use for several decades.) The town of Martinsburg was originally co-extensive with Martinsburg District, but later spread into adjoining districts. Between 1990 and 2000, Berkeley County was redivided into six magisterial districts: Adam Stephens, Norborne, Potomac, Shenandoah, Tuscarora, and Valley.

== Geography ==
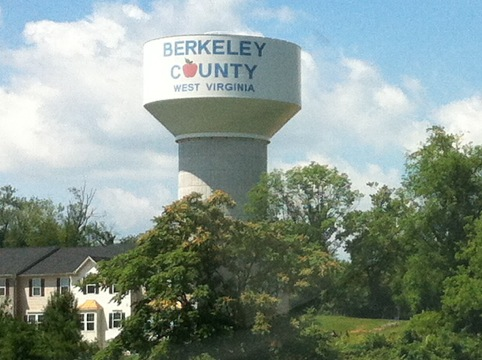
Water tower in Berkeley County, WV

According to the United States Census Bureau, the county has a total area of 322 square miles (830 km^{2}), of which 321 square miles (830 km^{2}) is land and 0.4 square miles (1.0 km^{2}) (0.1%) is water.

=== Mountains and hills ===
- Third Hill Mountain – highest and most topographically prominent peak in the county
- Sleepy Creek Mountain
- North Mountain

=== Rivers and streams ===
- Potomac River
- Back Creek
- Tilhance Creek
- Cherry Run
- Meadow Branch (tributary of Sleepy Creek in Morgan County)
- Opequon Creek
- Middle Creek
- Mill Creek
- Tuscarora Creek

=== Agricultural land and conservation easements ===
As of 2017, Berkeley County had 53 farmland easements which place permanent restrictions on development, covering 5,133 acres of land, according to the Berkeley County Farmland Protection Board.

=== Major highways ===
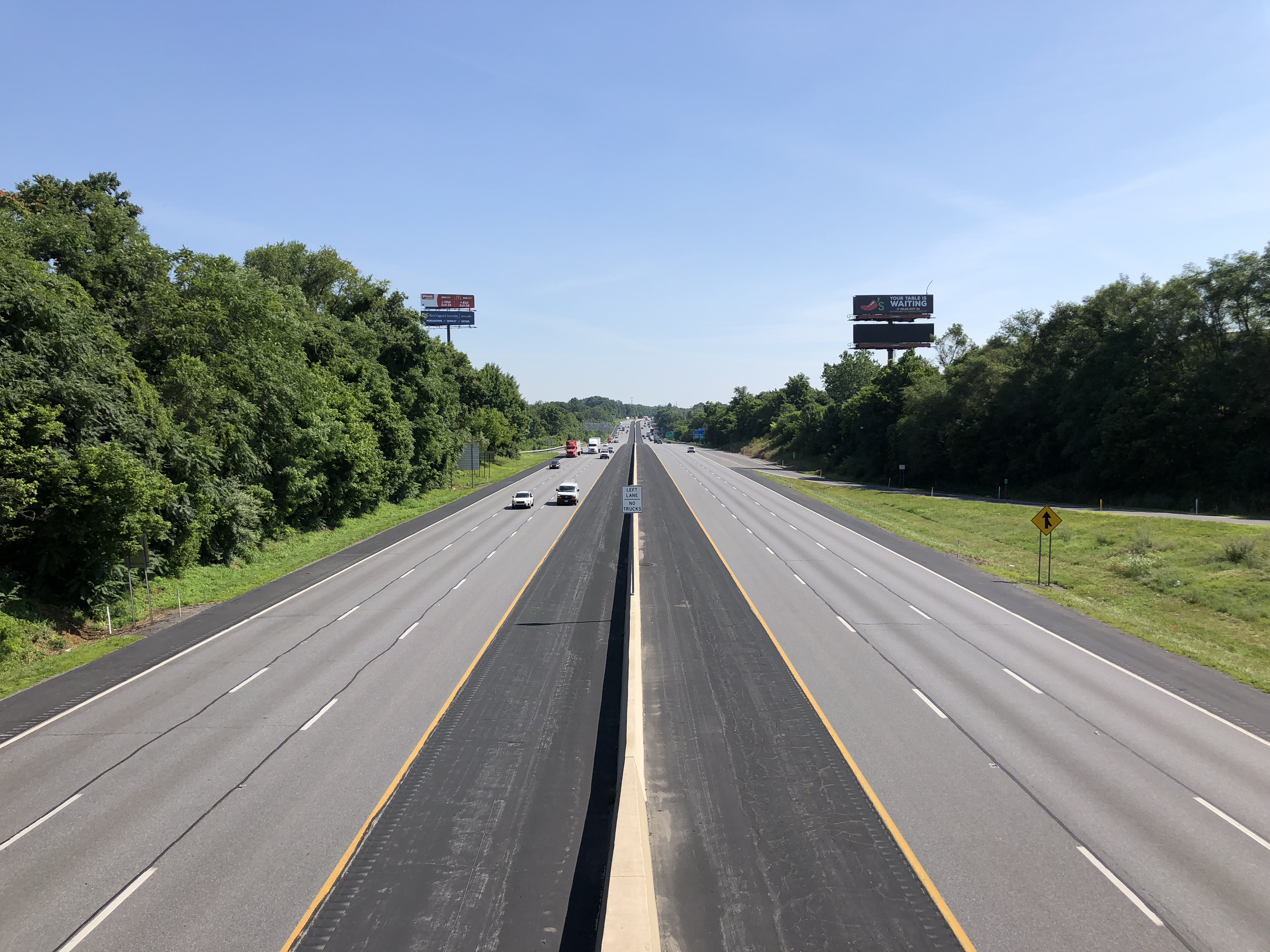
I-81 in Berkeley County

- I-81
- US 11
- WV 9
- WV 45
- WV 51
- WV 115
- WV 901

=== Adjacent counties ===
- Washington County, Maryland (north)
- Jefferson County (southeast)
- Frederick County, Virginia (south)
- Morgan County (northwest)

== Demographics ==
Historical population
Census	Pop.	Note	%±
1790	19,713		—
1800	22,006		11.6%
1810	11,479		−47.8%
1820	11,211		−2.3%
1830	10,518		−6.2%
1840	10,972		4.3%
1850	11,771		7.3%
1860	12,525		6.4%
1870	14,900		19.0%
1880	17,380		16.6%
1890	18,702		7.6%
1900	19,469		4.1%
1910	21,999		13.0%
1920	24,554		11.6%
1930	28,030		14.2%
1940	29,016		3.5%
1950	30,359		4.6%
1960	33,791		11.3%
1970	36,356		7.6%
1980	46,846		28.9%
1990	59,253		26.5%
2000	75,905		28.1%
2010	104,169		37.2%
2020	122,076		17.2%
2025 (est.)	139,522	▲	14.3%
U.S. Decennial Census; 1790–1960 1900–1990; 1990–2000 2010–2020

=== 2020 census ===
As of the 2020 census, the county had a population of 122,076. Of the residents, 23.5% were under the age of 18 and 15.3% were 65 years of age or older; the median age was 38.7 years. For every 100 females there were 98.2 males, and for every 100 females age 18 and over there were 96.5 males.

The racial makeup of the county was 80.5% White, 7.7% Black or African American, 0.3% American Indian and Alaska Native, 1.2% Asian, 2.3% from some other race, and 8.0% from two or more races. Hispanic or Latino residents of any race comprised 5.6% of the population.

There were 47,216 households in the county, of which 32.5% had children under the age of 18 living with them and 24.0% had a female householder with no spouse or partner present. About 25.6% of all households were made up of individuals and 10.1% had someone living alone who was 65 years of age or older. Of those households, 48.6% were married couples living together and 17.6% had a male householder with no spouse present. The average household and family size was 2.96.

There were 50,868 housing units, of which 7.2% were vacant. Among occupied housing units, 74.5% were owner-occupied and 25.5% were renter-occupied. The homeowner vacancy rate was 1.8% and the rental vacancy rate was 7.0%.

The median income for a household was $71,733 and the poverty rate was 9.2%.

Berkeley County, West Virginia – Racial and ethnic composition Note: the US Census treats Hispanic/Latino as an ethnic category. This table excludes Latinos from the racial categories and assigns them to a separate category. Hispanics/Latinos may be of any race.
Race / Ethnicity (NH = Non-Hispanic)	Pop 2000	Pop 2010	Pop 2020	% 2000	% 2010	% 2020
White alone (NH)	69,733	89,379	96,559	91.86%	85.80%	79.09%
Black or African American alone (NH)	3,523	7,234	9,118	4.64%	6.94%	7.46%
Native American or Alaska Native alone (NH)	173	242	284	0.22%	0.23%	0.23%
Asian alone (NH)	341	860	1,445	0.44%	0.82%	1.18%
Pacific Islander alone (NH)	13	29	43	0.01%	0.02%	0.03%
Other race alone (NH)	92	102	511	0.12%	0.09%	0.41%
Mixed race or Multiracial (NH)	874	2,362	7,223	1.15%	2.26%	5.91%
Hispanic or Latino (any race)	1,156	3,961	6,893	1.52%	3.80%	5.64%
Total	75,905	104,169	122,076	100.00%	100.00%	100.00%

=== 2010 census ===
As of the 2010 United States census, there were 104,169 people, 39,855 households, and 27,881 families residing in the county. The population density was 324.4 people per square mile (125.3 people/km^{2}). There were 44,762 housing units at an average density of 139.4 units per square mile (53.8 units/km^{2}). The racial makeup of the county was 87.8% white, 7.1% black or African American, 0.8% Asian, 0.3% American Indian, 1.2% from other races, and 2.6% from two or more races. Those of Hispanic or Latino origin made up 3.8% of the population. In terms of ancestry, 27.0% were German, 14.8% were Irish, 12.3% were English, 10.2% were American, and 5.1% were Italian.

Of the 39,855 households, 35.7% had children under the age of 18 living with them, 52.3% were married couples living together, 12.0% had a female householder with no husband present, 30.0% were non-families, and 23.4% of all households were made up of individuals. The average household size was 2.59 and the average family size was 3.04. The median age was 37.6 years.

The median income for a household in the county was $52,857 and the median income for a family was $64,001. Males had a median income of $45,654 versus $34,239 for females. The per capita income for the county was $25,460. About 7.0% of families and 10.1% of the population were below the poverty line, including 13.2% of those under age 18 and 6.5% of those age 65 or over.

=== 2000 census ===
As of the census of 2000, there were 75,905 people, 29,569 households, and 20,698 families residing in the county. The population density was 236 people per square mile (91 people/km^{2}). There were 32,913 housing units at an average density of 102 units per square mile (39 units/km^{2}). The racial makeup of the county was 92.74% White, 4.69% Black or African American, 0.25% Native American, 0.46% Asian, 0.02% Pacific Islander, 0.56% from other races, and 1.28% from two or more races. 1.52% of the population were Hispanic or Latino of any race.

There were 29,569 households, out of which 33.40% had children under the age of 18 living with them, 54.60% were married couples living together, 10.70% had a female householder with no husband present, and 30.00% were non-families. 24.20% of all households were made up of individuals, and 8.20% had someone living alone who was 65 years of age or older. The average household size was 2.53 and the average family size was 2.99.

In the county, the population was spread out, with 25.70% under the age of 18, 8.30% from 18 to 24, 31.30% from 25 to 44, 23.60% from 45 to 64, and 11.20% who were 65 years of age or older. The median age was 36 years. For every 100 females there were 99.10 males. For every 100 females age 18 and over, there were 96.40 males.

The median income for a household in the county was $38,763, and the median income for a family was $44,302. Males had a median income of $32,010 versus $23,351 for females. The per capita income for the county was $17,982. About 8.70% of families and 11.50% of the population were below the poverty line, including 14.60% of those under age 18 and 10.10% of those age 65 or over.

== Government and public safety ==
=== County government ===
Berkeley County has an elected five member County Commission.

=== Berkeley County Sheriff ===
The Sheriff's Office operates the county jail, provides court protection, provides county building and facility security, and provides patrol and detective services for unincorporated areas of the county. Martinsburg has a municipal police department.

As of 2025 1 officer of the Berkeley County Sheriff's Office has been killed in the line of duty.

=== Berkeley County Emergency Ambulance Authority ===
Emergency medical services for the county are provided by career employees of the BCEAA. A third service organization with an independent agency Board of Directors which includes an elected member of the county commission. BCEAA is responsible for all EMS throughout the county and is separate from the volunteer fire departments in the area. W. Brian Costello currently serves as its executive director.

== Politics ==
After having leaned strongly towards the Democratic Party between the New Deal and Bill Clinton’s presidency, most of West Virginia has since 2000 seen a powerful swing towards the Republican Party due to declining unionization and differences with the Democratic Party’s liberal views on social issues. Berkeley County, in contrast, was in the majority opposed to secession at the Virginia Secession Convention and has voted solidly Republican over most of the century and a half since, with the exception of Democratic landslides. No Democratic presidential candidate has carried Berkeley County since Lyndon Johnson in 1964.

United States presidential election results for Berkeley County, West Virginia
Year	Republican		Democratic		Third party(ies)	
Year	No.	%	No.	%	No.	%
1912	1,349	25.02%	2,703	50.14%	1,339	24.84%
1916	2,802	48.09%	2,938	50.43%	86	1.48%
1920	5,259	53.95%	4,399	45.13%	90	0.92%
1924	5,427	53.18%	4,366	42.78%	412	4.04%
1928	8,477	70.30%	3,540	29.36%	42	0.35%
1932	6,370	47.09%	7,009	51.81%	148	1.09%
1936	6,585	44.02%	8,336	55.72%	39	0.26%
1940	6,562	43.11%	8,658	56.89%	0	0.00%
1944	6,151	51.39%	5,819	48.61%	0	0.00%
1948	6,042	46.94%	6,797	52.80%	34	0.26%
1952	8,149	53.40%	7,111	46.60%	0	0.00%
1956	9,071	61.62%	5,649	38.38%	0	0.00%
1960	8,369	54.20%	7,072	45.80%	0	0.00%
1964	5,457	38.74%	8,628	61.26%	0	0.00%
1968	7,223	49.91%	4,929	34.06%	2,321	16.04%
1972	10,954	70.78%	4,523	29.22%	0	0.00%
1976	8,935	52.10%	8,216	47.90%	0	0.00%
1980	9,955	57.04%	6,783	38.86%	716	4.10%
1984	12,887	67.50%	6,181	32.37%	24	0.13%
1988	10,761	62.80%	6,313	36.84%	61	0.36%
1992	9,134	45.60%	7,159	35.74%	3,736	18.65%
1996	9,859	47.92%	8,321	40.44%	2,396	11.64%
2000	13,619	59.19%	8,797	38.23%	594	2.58%
2004	21,293	63.03%	12,244	36.24%	248	0.73%
2008	20,841	55.72%	15,994	42.76%	565	1.51%
2012	22,156	59.39%	14,275	38.26%	876	2.35%
2016	28,244	65.13%	12,321	28.41%	2,799	6.45%
2020	33,279	64.57%	17,186	33.35%	1,074	2.08%
2024	37,580	66.99%	17,500	31.19%	1,022	1.82%

== Communities ==
=== City ===
- Martinsburg (county seat)

=== Town ===
- Hedgesville

=== Census-designated places ===
- Falling Waters
- Inwood

=== Unincorporated communities ===
- Allensville
- Arden
- Baker Heights
- Baxter
- Bedington
- Berkeley
- Bessemer
- Blairton
- Bunker Hill
- Darkesville
- Douglas Grove
- Files Crossroad
- Ganotown
- Georgetown
- Gerrardstown
- Glengary
- Greensburg
- Grubbs Corner
- Hainesville
- Johnsontown
- Jones Springs
- Little Georgetown
- Marlowe
- Nipetown
- Nollville
- North Mountain
- Pikeside
- Ridgeway
- Scrabble
- Shanghai
- Spring Mills
- Swan Pond
- Tablers Station
- Tarico Heights
- Tomahawk
- Union Corner
- Van Clevesville
- Vanville
- Winebrenners Crossroad
- Wynkoop Spring

=== Magisterial districts ===
- Adam Stephen
- Norborne
- Potomac
- Shenandoah
- Tuscarora
- Valley

== Notable people ==
- Victoria "Vicky" Bullett, former professional women's basketball player, member of the 1988 and 1992 U.S. Olympic Teams that won gold and bronze medals respectively.
- Christopher Martinka, an award-winning Scottish-American documentary photographer.
- Thomas Hinds (1780–1840), a military hero of the War of 1812, US Congressman, and namesake of Hinds County, Mississippi.
- William Robinson Leigh (1866–1955), an American artist who specialized in Western scenes, was born at Maidstone Manor.
- Christian Lopez (born 1995), an American singer-songwriter and multi-instrumentalist.

== See also ==
- Berkeley County Schools
- National Register of Historic Places listings in Berkeley County, West Virginia
- List of counties in West Virginia

== Sources ==
- Vernon, Aler, F. (1888). Aler's History of Martinsburg and Berkeley County, West Virginia. Hagerstown, MD: Mail Publishing Company.
- Doherty, William Thomas (1972). Berkeley County, U.S.A.: a Bicentennial History of a Virginia and West Virginia County, 1772-1972. McClain Print Company. p. 307. ISBN 9780870121098.
- Evans, Willis (January 1, 2001). History of Berkeley County, West Virginia. Heritage Books (published 1928). ISBN 978-0-7884-1945-4.
- Dilger, Dr. Robert Jay, Director, Institute for Public Affairs and Professor of Political Science at West Virginia University
