= Rural letter carrier =

Letter carriers in rural areas

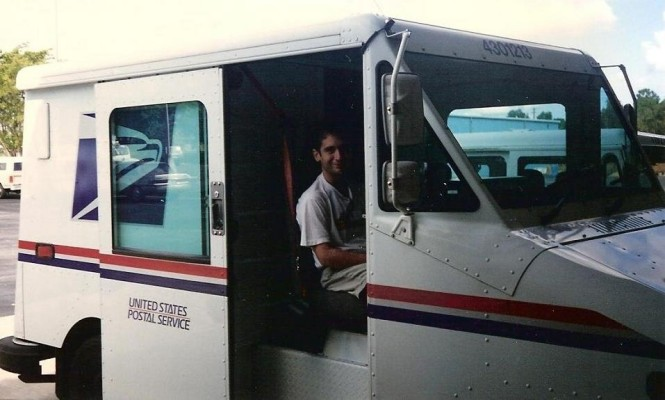
A rural letter carrier from Fort Myers, Florida in 2006

Rural letter carriers are United States Postal Service employees who deliver mail in what are traditionally considered rural and suburban areas of the United States. Before Rural Free Delivery (RFD), rural Americans and Canadians were required to go to a post office to get their mail.

== History ==
Much support for the introduction of a nationwide rural mail delivery service came from The National Grange of the Order of Patrons of Husbandry, the United States' oldest agricultural organization. Formerly, residents of rural areas had to either travel to a distant post office to pick up their mail, or else pay for delivery by a private carrier. Free mail delivery began in American cities in 1863 with a limited scope. Shortly afterwards, rural citizens began petitioning for equal consideration. Postmaster General John Wanamaker first suggested rural free deliver (RFD) of mail in the United States in his annual report for fiscal year 1891.

The Post Office Department first experimented with the idea of rural mail delivery on October 1, 1891 to determine the viability of RFD. They began with five routes covering ten miles, 33 years after free delivery in cities had begun. The first routes to receive RFD during its experimental phase were in Jefferson County, West Virginia, near Charles Town, Halltown and Uvilla.

After five years of controversy, RFD finally became an official service in 1896 under President Grover Cleveland. That year, 82 rural routes were put into operation. The service has grown steadily. By 1901, the mileage had increased to over 100,000; the cost was $1,750,321 and over 37,000 carriers were employed. In 1910, the mileage was 993,068; cost $36,915,000; carriers 40,997. In 1913 came the introduction of parcel post delivery, which caused another boom in rural deliveries. Parcel post service allowed the distribution of national newspapers and magazines, and was responsible for millions of dollars of sales in mail-order merchandise to customers in rural areas. In 1930, there were 43,278 rural routes serving about 6,875,321 families. The cost was $106,338,341. In 1916, the Good Roads Bill authorized federal funds for highway construction, which opened up roads in rural America to allow passage of mail.

The rural delivery service uses a network of rural routes traveled by carriers to deliver and pick up mail to and from roadside mailboxes. Formerly, an address for mail to a rural delivery address included both the rural route number and the box number, for example "RR 5, Box 10." With the creation of the 911 emergency system, it became necessary to discontinue the old rural route numbers in favor of house numbers and street names as used on city routes. This change enabled emergency services to more quickly locate a rural residence.

== Types of carriers ==
The rural carrier work force is divided into the following categories of employees:

=== Regular carriers (Designation Code 71) ===
For administrative and reporting purposes, regular rural carriers who serve on an established rural route on the basis of triweekly, five, five-and-a-half, or six days in a service week, are considered full-time employees.

=== Part-time flexible rural carriers (Designation Code 76) ===
Part-time flexible rural carriers (PTFs) are those substitutes or rural carrier associates appointed following an assignment posting. These employees provide service on regular and auxiliary routes as directed by management.

=== Substitutes, associates & reliefs ===
The following employees provide service on established regular and auxiliary rural routes in the absence of regular or auxiliary rural carriers. This service may be as leave replacement and/or covering vacant regular routes pending the selection of regular rural carriers, as an auxiliary assistant or as an auxiliary route carrier:

- Substitute rural carriers (Designation Code 72) appointed via Form 50 to serve full-time on a vacant regular route or in the absence of a regular carrier for more than 90 calendar days.
- Substitute rural carriers (Designation Code 73) are those employees hired prior to July 21, 1981, with an appointment without time limitation.
- Rural carrier associates (Designation Code 74) are appointed via Form 50 to serve full-time on a vacant route or in the absence of the regular carrier for more than 90 calendar days. Designation Code 75 are those employees hired between July 21, 1981 and November 12, 1986 without time limitation. Designation Code 78 are those employees hired from a register or reassigned from rural carrier relief or auxiliary carrier positions, on or after April 11, 1987, without time limitation. Designation Code 79 are appointed via Form 50 after being assigned to the auxiliary route for more than 90 calendar days.

=== Auxiliary rural carriers (Designation Code 77) ===
Persons hired prior to 1981 to serve an auxiliary rural route without time limitation.

=== Assistant Rural Carriers (Designation Code 70-5) ===
Assistant Rural Carriers (ARCs) were added to the 2016 contract. They primarily assist with package delivery on weekends & holidays, but can also be used to perform standard route duties on Saturdays.

== Labor union ==
The National Rural Letter Carriers' Association was formed in 1903 at a cost of fifty cents per year in dues to its members. Since its inception, it has had an effective legislative program in the United States Congress to promote and protect the interests of rural carriers. In 1962, President John F. Kennedy signed executive order 10988 establishing employee-management cooperation in the federal service. Rural carriers selected the NRLCA as their agent, and they have held exclusive recognition to represent the rural carrier craft within the United States Postal Service ever since. The NRLCA negotiates all labor agreements for the rural carrier craft with the USPS, including salaries. Rural letter carriers are considered bargaining unit employees in the United States Postal Service. This means that there is a contract between the Postal Service and the NRLCA. Only NRLCA can represent members of the rural carrier craft in the grievance procedure, including providing protection in disciplinary actions.

To be able to join the NRLCA, one must first be employed by the USPS and work in the rural carrier craft as a rural carrier associate, substitute rural carrier, rural carrier relief, part-time flexible or regular carrier. Temporary relief carriers, under guidelines covered by article 7 of the NRLCA/USPS contract, are excluded from membership. Upon completion and processing of NRLCA form 1187, an official membership card is mailed, and the benefits of membership begin. NRLCA provides information and fellowship for its members at county, district, state and national meetings where all members may participate in a democratic process of developing association policy. The NRLCA provides a monthly publication, The National Rural Letter Carrier, to keep its members informed on postal and legislative matters of vital interest.

== Attire ==
Rural carriers wear civilian clothes, not uniforms, while they deliver the mail. A minimal dress code is enforced, requiring cleanliness and a manner of dress that presents a positive image of the Postal Service. Suggestive dress is prohibited. Proper footwear is required (no open toes or heels).

With national attention focusing on heightening security, rural carriers wear and display identification badges. ID badges are issued for security control of access to postal premises and operations and to identify individuals as USPS employees. An ID badge is provided to each rural carrier to be displayed during official duty hours.

== Vehicle ==
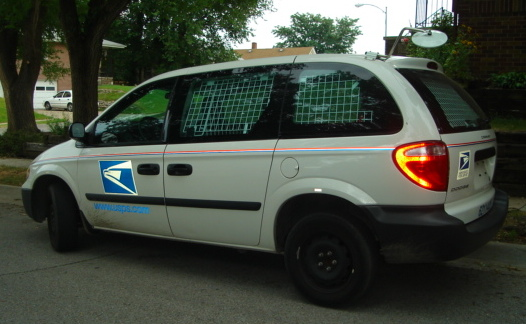
A Dodge Caravan used for rural delivery in Omaha, Nebraska

Rural carriers are responsible for furnishing all vehicle equipment necessary for safe and prompt handling of the mail, unless a USPS-owned/leased vehicle is assigned to the route. (If a USPS-owned/leased vehicle is assigned to the route, relief carriers may be requested, but not required, to furnish a vehicle during emergency situations). The vehicle is required to be large enough to accommodate the normal mail volume and constructed to protect the mail from loss or damage.

For each day servicing a route using a privately owned vehicle, the USPS pays an "Equipment Maintenance Allowance" (EMA) in accordance with the applicable schedule. The carrier receives EMA for each service day they report to the Post Office, and is scheduled to perform delivery.

Advertisements of any kind and offensive slogans are prohibited from appearing on the vehicle and attire of the rural carrier.

== Payment ==
In 1962, the NRLCA and Post Office negotiated their first contract under Executive Order 10988, and within it, the Heavy Duty Agreement, or Evaluated Pay System was instituted. Rural Carriers are paid a salary based on an evaluation of the route they deliver. Credit is given for all a carrier's duties and compensated accordingly. Adjustments to the annual salary may be made periodically as route situations change, such as the addition or deletion of territory or mileage. As an example, for every 12 houses with curbside service the route would be compensated for 24 minutes per week (4 minutes per day) along with associated time values for mail that is delivered or picked up, and mileage driven. The yearly salary range for most regular Rural Carriers on will vary between $40,000 and $65,000 depending on the route evaluation and longevity. Rural carriers cannot earn overtime pay except for short period during the Christmas season, unless they sign the RDWL to work their assigned day off for the week.

There are cost of living adjustments and salary increases that are negotiated in each four-year contract. There are 15 step increases in a Rural Carrier pay scale. It takes about 12 years for a Rural Carrier to max out at the top of the pay scale.

Relief carriers can be required to be trained on up to three routes. A relief carrier may be required to carry a route other than the primary route. The time would then be recorded on the PS Form 4240 for that route. PS Form 1234 Utility Card (commonly called green card) is used to record work hours when the carrier is doing miscellaneous duties or when attending training. Carriers will use more than one utility card if they work in more than one station. All times are compiled by the timekeeper and submitted for pay.

=== RRECS ===
On July 3, 2012, the postal service & NRLCA agreed to create the Rural Route Evaluated Compensation System (RRECS). From January 2013 to June 2018, a panel of engineers, consisting of Ken Mericle, Don Ratliff & Luis Martín-Vega, began developing an automated system that captured daily counts of work activities (whereas the evaluated pay system was originally based upon a 2-week count). Count data is also captured from mapping software developed by the project. Mapping captures the line of travel for each route, plus the distances of mailstops, mailboxes and direct door delivery stops associated with each customer address. These mapped locations are used to calculate walking and driving distances.

On March 20, 2023, the NRLCA was notified that because of system issues, the PS Forms 4241-A could not be generated, causing a delay in RRECS implementation until at least April 8. On April 7, the NRLCA & USPS reached an agreement to delay the implementation of the initial rural route evaluations under RRECS until April 22, despite the NRLCA seeking a 60-day delay. On April 21, the NRLCA and USPS reached a second agreement to delay its implementation until May 6.

On May 5, a group of U.S. senators, consisting of Democrats Ron Wyden, Elizabeth Warren, Sherrod Brown, Ed Markey & John Fetterman and Independent Bernie Sanders, sent a letter to United States postmaster general Louis DeJoy saying RRECS should not be used until the system’s serious flaws are rectified. Regardless, the system went into effect the following day.

RRECS had a devastating effect on rural carrier pay. Two-thirds of all rural letter carriers lost at least one hour per week, and 44% lost four hours or more. Only 14% of rural carriers actually gained hours. The changes also added days worked while reducing hours on those days, reducing opportunities for overtime. The number of K routes (routes evaluated at 5 days a week) dropped from 65,910 to 49,747, a difference of 16,163. J routes (5.5 days a week) increased from 5,012 to 11,429, and H routes (routes carried 6 days a week without a relief day) increased from 3,427 to 13,142, an increase of 9,715.

== Canadian Rural & Suburban Mail Carriers ==
In Canada, Rural and Suburban Mail Carriers (RSMCs) existed only as contractors rather than employees of Canada Post until 2003. As such, RSMCs received no benefits. The Organization of Rural Route Mail Couriers was formed in 1987. On May 1, 2002, the Organization of Rural Route Mail Couriers sent representatives to the Canadian Union of Postal Workers (CUPW).

On September 30, 2003, RSMCs ratified a collective agreement making them CUPW members with rights. Their first collective agreement with Canada Post (which is separate from the CUPW collective bargaining agreement for all the other postal crafts) went into effect on January 1, 2004 as an eight-year contract with 're-openers' every two years.

Delivery of rural & suburban mail is generally to cluster boxes (rather than door-to-door), so that fewer RSMCs are required. Canada Post has designated that rural mail routes with more than 330 rural mailboxes (RMB's) are designated right hand drive (RHD) routes. RHD vehicles used by Canada Post employees can be purchased with the help of a vehicle allowance from Canada Post or provided by Canada Post directly. Vehicle maintenance allowances are similar to those offered in the United States.
