= Stephen Q. Luckett =

American painter (1938–2025)

- Born: Stephen Quinton Luckett; October 13, 1938; Mount Vernon, New York, U.S.
- Died: August 29, 2025 (aged 86)
- Occupations: Painter, illustrator, actor, and businessperson
- Mother: Alberta Shelton Luckett Tolbert
- Relatives: Benjamin Franklin Shelton, Sr. (grandfather); Ida Rebecca Edwards Shelton (grandmother)

Stephen Quinton Luckett (October 13, 1938 — August 29, 2025) was an American painter, illustrator, actor, and businessperson from the U.S. state of West Virginia. Originally from Mount Vernon, New York, Luckett was raised in Halltown, West Virginia, where he operated local businesses, taught art, and exhibited his paintings regionally and nationally, including at the Smithsonian Institution. Luckett also acted in film and theatre, directed a local food bank, and illustrated a publication documenting African American heritage in Jefferson County, West Virginia.

== Early life ==
Nicknamed "Lucky," Stephen Quinton Luckett was born in Mount Vernon, New York, on October 13, 1938, to Alberta Shelton Luckett Tolbert. In 1948, at the age of ten, he relocated to Halltown, West Virginia, where his grandparents, Benjamin Franklin Shelton, Sr., and Ida Rebecca Edwards Shelton, raised him. Accustomed to the illuminated nighttime environment of an urban setting, Luckett initially found West Virginia's nighttime strikingly dark upon his arrival by train. However, he subsequently expressed his appreciation for the natural beauty of the state, noting that his preferred colors of "brown-yellow-gold and greens" reflected his love for West Virginia and the state's influence on him.

== Paintings and exhibitions ==
In his early life, Luckett established a grocery store and sign painting business known as Lucky's Bait and Sign Shop in Halltown, in addition to operating a bookkeeping service. He pursued painting independently, successfully completing a fine arts correspondence course through the Famous Artists School in 1967. Luckett painted both signs and fine art pieces, including landscapes and portraits. In addition, he instructed art classes.

Luckett's earlier exhibitions occurred in 1965 at the Potomac Vista Casa de Regalos store in Harpers Ferry, West Virginia, followed by the Washington County Museum of Fine Arts in Hagerstown, Maryland, in 1968. Luckett subsequently exhibited his work at the Mountain Heritage Arts and Crafts Show in Jefferson County, West Virginia, the Virginia National Bank in Reston, Virginia, the Harpers Ferry Art Show and Festival in Harpers Ferry, the Jefferson County Fair art shows (where he won several first place awards), the Brunswick-Potomac River Festival in Brunswick, Maryland, and the Shepherd College Art Festival, the Shenandoah Downs in Charles Town, West Virginia, the Blakely Bank and Trust Company, the Peoples Bank, and the Bank of Charles Town. In 1973, Luckett exhibited a collection of drawings and paintings at the Brunswick Public Library in Brunswick, as part of the Brunswick-Potomac Foundation's Year-Round Art Program.

In 1981, Luckett's painting The Winner was selected by the National Museum of American Art, Smithsonian Institution, for the exhibition, "More Than Land or Sky: Art from Appalachia," which toured thirteen Appalachian states in the early 1980s. Luckett noted the Smithsonian's selection of his painting for this exhibition as a career high point. In 1982, six of his works, including Country Scenes and The Old Barn, were exhibited at the Oglebay Institute in Wheeling, West Virginia. His work also featured in the 2018 "Four African-American Artists from Jefferson County" exhibition at the Jefferson County Museum in Charles Town. In addition, he illustrated the 1994 publication, Historical Digest of Jefferson County, West Virginia's African American Congregations, 1864-1994.

== Acting ==
Luckett appeared in the films Ghost Stories of Harpers Ferry (1974), portraying one of John Brown's men, and Pudd'nhead Wilson (1984). In 1977, he portrayed Shields Green in the play The Anvil about John Brown's raid on Harpers Ferry at the Jefferson County Courthouse in Charles Town. Luckett also appeared in the play The Little Foxes at the Old Opera House in Charles Town in 1982.

== Later life and philanthropy ==
Luckett remained a lifelong resident of Halltown, West Virginia, operating his business and, during midlife, serving as a notary and tax preparer. In the early 1990s, he joined the Beware Against Drugs, Inc. free food program, and became its director in 1995, personally funding the program during times of financial shortfall. Also in 1995, Luckett was interviewed regarding the history of the Halltown Union Colored Sunday School for the book Black Heritage Sites: An African American Odyssey and Finder's Guide.

By 2018, Luckett had retired from other vocations but continued preparing income taxes. While he held many professions, Luckett identified painting as his first love, equating the completion of a painting with profound personal satisfaction. He died on August 29, 2025, with a memorial service held on September 18, 2025, at Eckles-Spencer and Norton Funeral Home in Halltown.

== Works ==
- The Winner (1975), oil on plywood, 24 x 30 ½ (61 x 77.5)
- The Old Barn (1981), oil on canvas

== Bibliography ==
- Curtis, Nancy C. (1996). Black Heritage Sites: An African American Odyssey and Finder's Guide. American Library Association. OCLC 1301806408 – via Internet Archive.
- Nosanow, Barbara Shissler (1981). More Than Land or Sky: Art from Appalachia. Washington, D.C.: National Museum of American Art, Smithsonian Institution Press. OCLC 7741600 – via Internet Archive.
- R. R. Bowker (1994). American Book Publishing Record. New York: R. R. Bowker. OCLC 761219582 – via Internet Archive.
