= Reedson, West Virginia =

- Unincorporated community
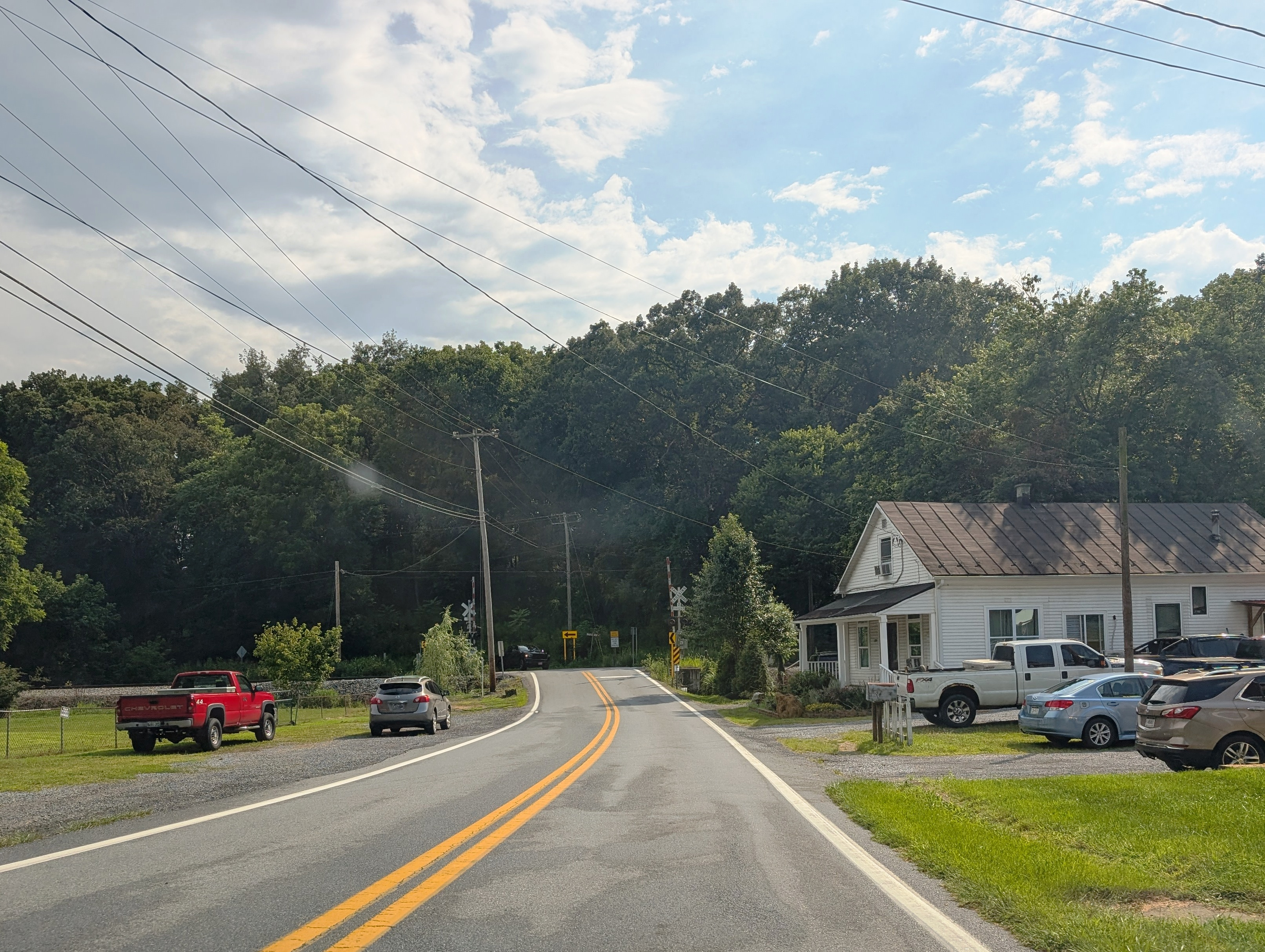
- WV 230 southbound in Reedson

- Location within West Virginia Location within the United States
- Coordinates: 39°21′9″N 77°48′5″W
- Country: United States
- State: West Virginia
- County: Jefferson
- Time zone: UTC-5 (Eastern (EST))
  - Summer (DST): UTC-4 (EDT)
- GNIS feature ID: 1555460

Reedson is an unincorporated community on Shepherdstown Pike (West Virginia Route 230) in Jefferson County, West Virginia, United States. Reedson lies between Uvilla to its North, and Halltown to its South.
