= Steel Swallow =

Defunct American motor vehicle manufacturer

The Steel Swallow was a two-seater runabout produced by the Steel Swallow Automobile Company of Jackson, Michigan from 1907 to 1908.

The Steel Swallow was powered by an 8-hp 2-cylinder air-cooled engine with a friction transmission with an 84-inch wheelbase. The vehicle cost $700 (equivalent to $24,187 in 2025) and was designed by David Dearing. In 1908 a 'Special R.F.D.' light delivery model was available, but the company was out of business before the end of the year.
