= Mechanicstown =

Mechanicstown may refer to:

- Mechanicstown, New York
- Mechanicstown, Ohio
- Mechanicstown, West Virginia
- Mechanicstown Elementary School
