= Halltown Colored Free School =

- U.S. National Register of Historic Places
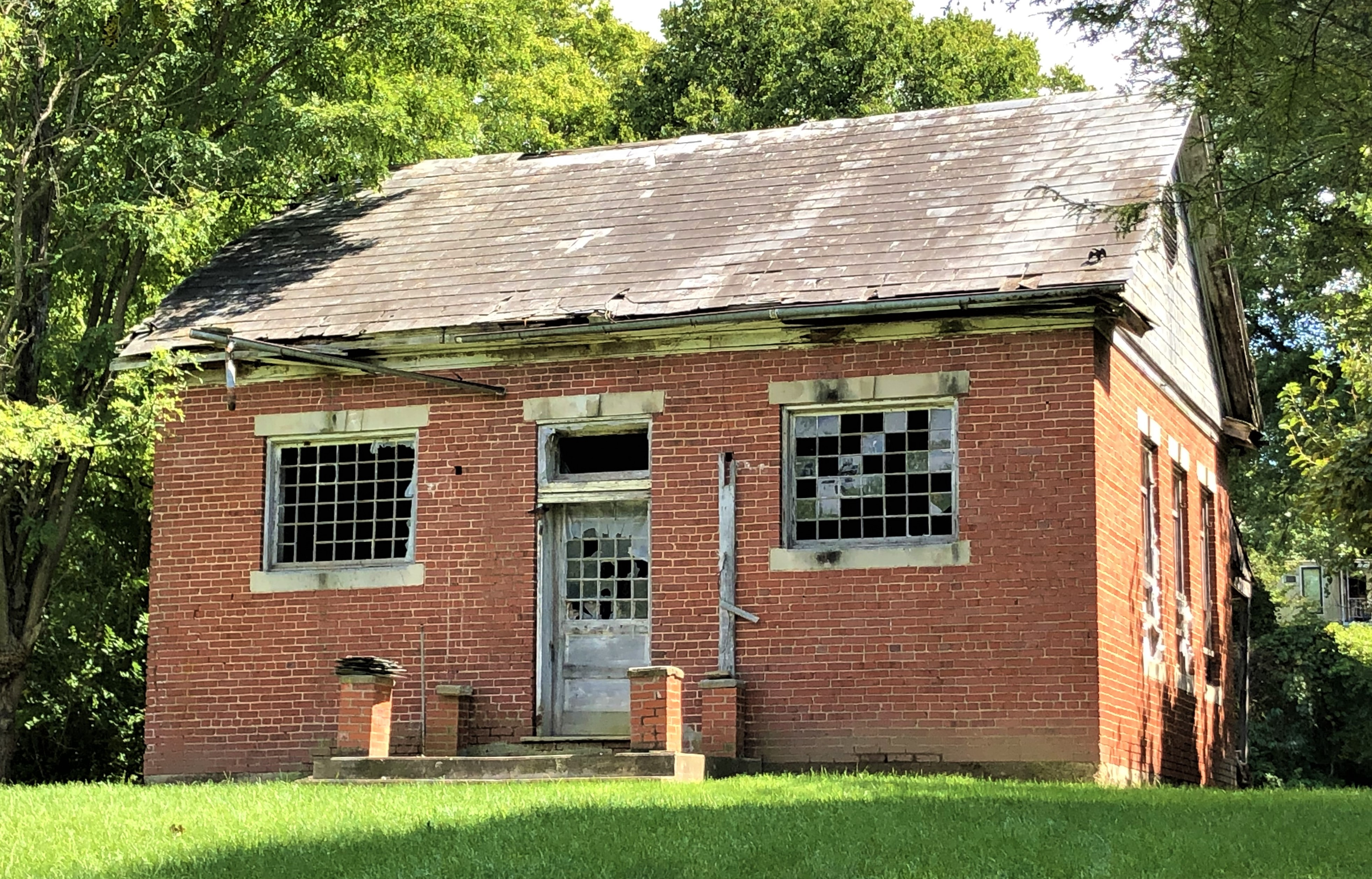
- (2022)

- Location within West Virginia Location within the United States
- Location: Halltown Rd., 0.5 mi (0.80 km) northeast of U.S. Route 340, Halltown, West Virginia
- Coordinates: 39°18′34″N 77°48′09″W
- Area: 0.3 acres (0.12 ha)
- Built: 1870
- Built by: Thomas Edwards
- Architectural style: Classical Revival
- NRHP reference No.: 04000912
- Added to NRHP: August 25, 2004

The Halltown Colored Free School in Halltown, West Virginia was built in 1870 to educate children from the African-American community in Halltown. The school was racially segregated from local schools for whites, in accordance with the laws of the time. It functioned in that capacity until 1929, when it was converted to a residence.

The school is to the left and behind the Halltown Union Colored Sunday School, and is owned by the same community organization.

It was listed on the National Register of Historic Places in 2004.
