= Rural Free Delivery =

American mail delivery program

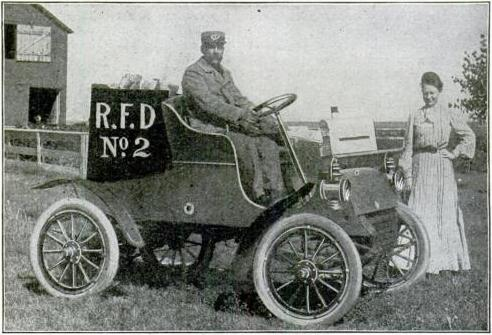
Rural Free Delivery vehicle (from Popular Mechanics, September 1905)

Rural Free Delivery (RFD), since 1906 officially rural delivery, is a program of the United States Post Office Department to deliver mail directly to rural destinations. The program began in the late 19th century. Before that, people living in rural areas had to pick up mail themselves at sometimes distant post offices or pay private carriers for delivery.

The proposal to offer free rural delivery was not universally embraced. Private carriers and local shopkeepers feared a loss of business. RFD became a political football, with politicians promising it to voters while benefitting from it themselves as a means of reaching voters. The United States Post Office Department began experiments with Rural Free Delivery as early as 1890. However, it was not until 1893 that Georgia representative Thomas E. Watson pushed through legislation that mandated the practice. However, universal implementation was slow; RFD was not adopted generally across the country until 1902.

The rural delivery service has used a network of rural routes traveled by carriers to deliver to and pick it up from roadside mailboxes. As of 2012, the United States Postal Service (USPS) rural delivery service served about 41 million homes and businesses. As of 2022, the USPS had about 133,000 rural letter carriers serving 80,000 rural routes.

== History ==
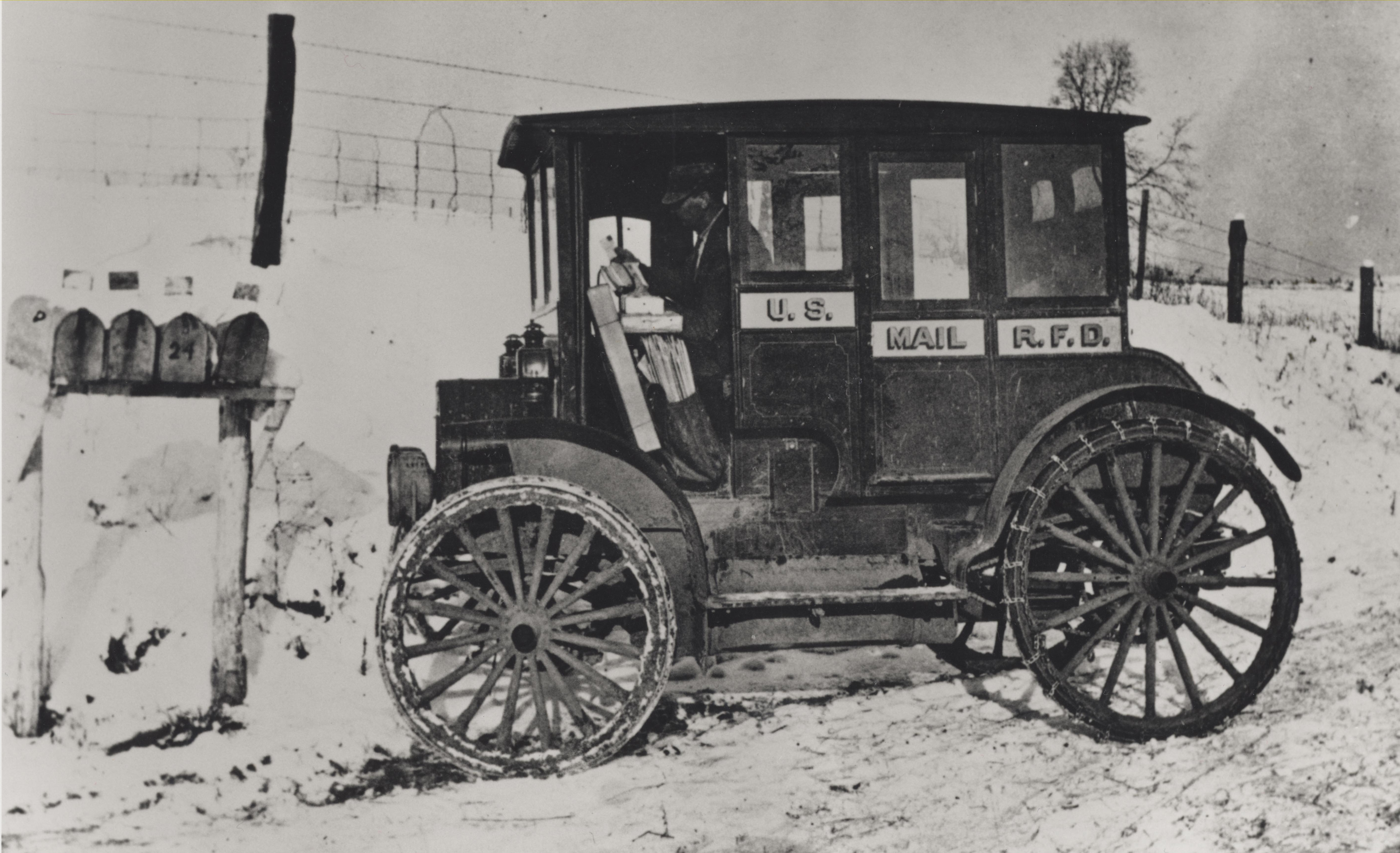
Rural carrier in an early electric vehicle, circa 1910

Until the late 19th century, residents of rural areas had to travel to a designated distant post office to pick up their mail or to pay for delivery by a private carrier. Fayette County in east-central Indiana claims to be the birthplace of Rural Free Delivery. Milton Trusler, a leading farmer in the county, began advocating the idea in 1880; as the president of the Indiana Grange, he spoke to farmers statewide frequently over the following 16 years. Postmaster General John Wanamaker, owner of a major department store, was ardently in favor of Rural Free Delivery (RFD), with many thousands of Americans living in rural communities who wanted to send and receive retail orders inexpensively. Support for the introduction of a nationwide rural mail delivery service came from The National Grange of the Order of Patrons of Husbandry, the nation's oldest agricultural organization.

The Post Office Department first experimented with the idea of rural mail delivery in 1896, to determine the viability of RFD. It began with five routes covering 10 miles, 33 years after free delivery in cities had begun. The first routes to receive RFD during its experimental phase were in Jefferson County, West Virginia, near Charles Town; Halltown; and Uvilla.

Legislation by Congressman Thomas E. Watson of Georgia mandated the practice, and RFD finally became an official service in 1896. That year, 82 rural routes were put into operation. Tens of thousands of routes had to be found. A massive undertaking, nationwide RFD service took several years to implement, and remains the "biggest and most expensive endeavor" ever instituted by the U.S. Postal Service.

The service grew steadily. By 1901, the mileage had increased to over 100,000; the cost was $1,750,321, and over 37,000 carriers were employed. In 1910, the mileage was 993,068; the cost was $36,915,000, and 40,997 carriers were employed. In 1913 came the introduction of parcel post delivery, which caused another boom in rural deliveries. Parcel post service allowed the distribution of national newspapers and magazines, and was responsible for millions of dollars of sales in mail-order merchandise to customers in rural areas. By 1930, 43,278 rural routes served over 6,875,300 families, amounting to about 25,472,00 persons, at a cost of $106,338,341. The Rural Post Roads Act of 1916 authorized federal funds for rural post roads.

The adoption of a nationwide RFD system had many opponents. Most important were the four rich, powerful express companies that monopolized the delivery of valuable or time-sensitive packages. Wayne Fuller concludes that they "arrogantly served the public, rendered only mediocre service, [and] made inordinate profits." They were unregulated and confused customers with myriad rates; in rural areas they dropped off packages at the train depot. Furthermore many politically connected town merchants worried that the service would reduce farmers' weekly visits to town to obtain supplies, or that Sears, Roebuck and Company with its catalogs would undermine their local business. The opponents mounted a fierce opposition to the use of parcel post, delaying full implementation. However Sears and the other mail-order houses realized that parcel post would be to their advantage and joined the farmers in a coalition that finally overcame the local merchants and express companies. Indeed, Sears sales tripled in the first five years after parcel post started in 1913.

== First routes ==
The following is a list of the first rural routes established in each state, along with the names of the (up to three) post offices served and the date of establishment.

State	Post office(s)	Date
Alabama	Opelika	December 7, 1896
Alaska	Nome	May 10, 1901
Arizona	Tempe	November 24, 1896
Arkansas	Clarksville	October 19, 1896
California	Campbell	February 1, 1897
Colorado	Loveland	November 10, 1896
Connecticut	Branford, Guilford, Milford	June 1, 1898
Delaware	Harrington	October 3, 1898
District of Columbia	Anacostia, Bennings	September 1, 1902
Florida	Winter Park	January 1, 1898
Georgia	Quitman	December 8, 1896
Hawaii	Haiku	March 1, 1918
Idaho	Moscow	April 14, 1900
Illinois	Auburn	December 10, 1896
Indiana	Hartsville, Hope	October 15, 1896
Iowa	Morning Sun	November 10, 1896
Kansas	Bonner Springs	October 26, 1896
Kentucky	Allensville	January 11, 1897
Louisiana	Thibodaux	November 1, 1896
Maine	Gorham, Naples, Sebago Lake	November 23, 1896
Maryland	Westminster	October 15, 1896
Massachusetts	Bernardston, Greenfield	November 2, 1896
Michigan	Climax	December 3, 1896
Minnesota	Farmington	January 1, 1897
Mississippi	Hickory	October 1, 1901
Missouri	Cairo	October 15, 1896
Montana	Billings	February 1, 1902
Nebraska	Tecumseh	November 7, 1896
Nevada	Lovelock	December 1, 1903
New Hampshire	Pittsfield	October 20, 1898
New Jersey	Moorestown	June 6, 1898
New Mexico	Roswell	March 1, 1902
New York	Elba	October 15, 1896
North Carolina	China Grove	October 23, 1896
North Dakota	Wahpeton	October 3, 1898
Ohio	Collinsville, Darrtown, Somerville	October 15, 1896
Oklahoma	Hennessey	August 15, 1900
Oregon	Turner	October 16, 1897
Pennsylvania	New Stanton, Ruffsdale	November 24, 1896
Rhode Island	South Portsmouth	January 1, 1899
South Carolina	Cope, Orangeburg, Saint George	March 1, 1899
South Dakota	Ellis	May 1, 1899
Tennessee	Atoka	January 11, 1897
Texas	Fate, La Grange	August 1, 1899
Utah	Murray	August 15, 1899
Vermont	Grand Isle	December 21, 1896
Virginia	Palmyra	October 22, 1896
Washington	North Yakima	April 1, 1897
West Virginia	Charles Town, Halltown, Uvilla	October 1, 1896
Wisconsin	Sun Prairie	November 16, 1896
Wyoming	Hilliard, Sheridan, Wheatland	October 15, 1900

== See also ==
- U.S. Parcel Post stamps of 1912–13
- Mayberry R.F.D.

== Sources ==
- Barron, Hal S. Mixed Harvest: The Second Great Transformation in the Rural North, 1870-1930 (U of North Carolina Press, 1997).
- Fuller, Wayne Edison. RFD, the changing face of rural America (1964), a standard scholarly history online
- Fuller, Wayne E. “Good Roads and Rural Free Delivery of Mail.” Mississippi Valley Historical Review 42#1 (1955), pp. 67–83. online
- Kernell, Samuel, and Michael P. McDonald. "Congress and America's political development: The transformation of the post office from patronage to service." American Journal of Political Science 43#3 (1999), pp. 792–811 in JSTOR; online copy
- Leach, William (1993). Land of Desire: Merchants, Power, and the Rise of a New American Culture. New York: Vintage Books (Random House), 1994. ISBN 0-679-75411-3.
