= Johnsontown, West Virginia =

Johnsontown is the name of several communities in the U.S. state of West Virginia.

- Johnsontown, Berkeley County, West Virginia
- Johnsontown, Jefferson County, West Virginia
