= Mountain Mission, West Virginia =

- Unincorporated community
- Location within West Virginia Location within the United States
- Coordinates: 39°14′45″N 77°47′37″W
- Country: United States
- State: West Virginia
- County: Jefferson
- Time zone: UTC-5 (Eastern (EST))
  - Summer (DST): UTC-4 (EDT)
- GNIS feature ID: 1555179

Mountain Mission is an unincorporated community on Charles Town Road (West Virginia Route 115) in Jefferson County, West Virginia, United States. Mountain Mission lies between the Shenandoah River and the community of Mannings.
