= White House Farm (Jefferson County, West Virginia) =

Historic house in West Virginia, United States

- U.S. National Register of Historic Places
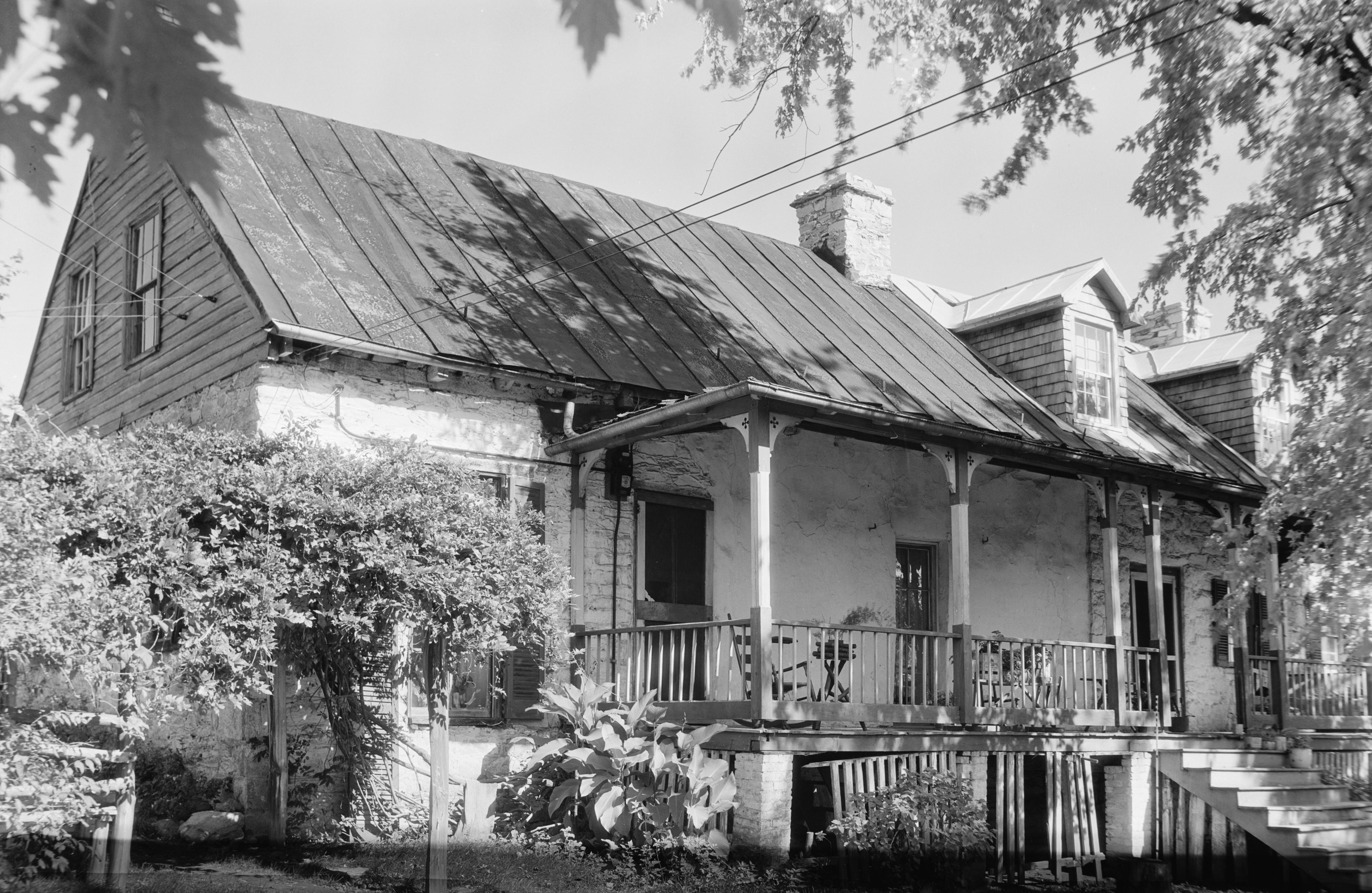
- Front of the farmhouse as it appeared in the 1930s

- Location within West Virginia Location within the United States
- Location: Jefferson County, West Virginia, USA
- Nearest city: Summit Point, West Virginia
- Coordinates: 39°15′5″N 77°56′45″W
- Built: 1742
- NRHP reference No.: 79002583
- Added to NRHP: August 29, 1979

White House Farm, also known as White House Tavern and the Dr. John McCormick House, listed in the National Register of Historic Places, is located in Jefferson County, West Virginia, near the small town of Summit Point, about six miles from Charles Town, West Virginia. The farm consists of a ca. 1740 farmhouse, a stone barn (the oldest standing in West Virginia), a springhouse of about the same age, a wooden curing shed, and 60+ acres of pasture and woods. The farm is one of the oldest in the county and has a rich history.

== History ==
In May 1740, Dr. John McCormick, a Scots-Irish immigrant, purchased 395 acres (1.60 km^{2}) from Jost Hite, a German land developer who had obtained 30,000 acres (120 km^{2}) from John and Isaac Van Metre. By 1742, Dr. McCormick had built a three-story stone farmhouse. He was a prosperous and prominent country doctor, as evidenced by the inventory of his estate completed upon his death in 1768. He and his wife Ann had six sons (James, Francis, John Jr., William, George, and Andrew) and two daughters (Mary, wife of Magnus Tate, and Jean, wife of James Byrn). George Washington completed a survey of McCormick's land in 1752 and James McCormick served as the chain carrier and John Jr. as the pilot on several of George Washington's early surveys. White House Farm was noted for the horses bred there during Dr. McCormick's lifetime.

Upon Dr. McCormick's death in 1768, the farm was bequeathed to his youngest son, Andrew. During the Revolutionary War, Andrew and his wife Nancy provided food, lodging, and horses to Washington's troops. After the war, Andrew apparently operated an inn on the farm, for he paid for an "ordinary" license on February 18, 1794. For such an endeavor, the site benefited from its location on the most direct route between Frederick, Maryland and Winchester, Virginia.

On September 9, 1807, Andrew sold the farm to John Locke and John's brother George managed the ordinary, which had become known as White House Tavern. By 1845, Eleanor Locke, John's daughter, was living in the house with her husband, Joseph Morrow, a farmer who also operated a blacksmith shop across the road near the springhouse during the Civil War. During the Civil War, Major Harry Gilmor, Confederate States Army and his men were attacked by a group of Union soldiers led by Captain George Somers as the Confederates were resting in front of the house. Major Gilmor shot and killed Captain Somers as his men took cover behind the barn. The house was renovated in the late 1800s by the Morrows and subsequent owners added a few rooms.

Between 1929 and 1940 the farm was owned by Luther and Lelia Naylor, who converted the stone stable into a milking barn and constructed a silo. The black and white photograph shows the house as it appeared in the 1930s. This dairy operation continued until about 1950 when Col. and Mrs. Edward Blake purchased the property, which was passed on to John and Alice Blake Van Tol in 1974.
