= Skeetersville, West Virginia =

- Unincorporated community
- Location within West Virginia Location within the United States
- Coordinates: 39°21′51″N 77°48′56″W
- Country: United States
- State: West Virginia
- County: Jefferson
- Time zone: UTC-5 (Eastern (EST))
  - Summer (DST): UTC-4 (EDT)
- GNIS ID: 1555635

Skeetersville is an unincorporated community in Jefferson County, West Virginia, United States.
