= Silver Grove, West Virginia =

- Unincorporated community
- Location within West Virginia Location within the United States
- Coordinates: 39°17′58″N 77°45′6″W
- Country: United States
- State: West Virginia
- County: Jefferson
- Time zone: UTC-5 (Eastern (EST))
  - Summer (DST): UTC-4 (EDT)
- GNIS feature ID: 1555625

Silver Grove is an unincorporated community in Jefferson County, West Virginia, United States. Silver Grove lies between the Harpers Ferry National Historical Park along the Shenandoah River and the Loudoun Heights of the Blue Ridge.
