= William Leach (historian) =

American historian

William Leach is an American historian. He is professor emeritus of history at Columbia University.

== Education ==
He received a BA from Rutgers in 1965 and a PhD from the University of Rochester in 1976.

== Awards and honors ==
His book Land of Desire was a finalist for the 1993 National Book Award and received the Herbert Hoover Book Award from the Herbert Hoover Presidential Library and Museum.

== Books ==
- Butterfly People. An American Encounter With the Beauty of the World (2013)
- Country of Exiles: The Destruction of Place in American Life (1999)
- Land of Desire: Merchants, Power, and the Rise of a New American Culture (1993)
- True Love and Perfect Union: The Feminist Reform of Sex and Society (1980)
