= West Virginia Route 115 =

State highway in West Virginia, United States

West Virginia Route 115

Route information
- Maintained by WVDOH
- Length: 19.2 mi (30.9 km)

Major junctions
- South end: WV 9 / CR 32 near Mannings
- US 340 in Charles Town; WV 51 in Charles Town; WV 9 near Baker Heights
- North end: CR 9/17 (Opequon Lane) near Baker Heights

Location
- Country: United States
- State: West Virginia
- Counties: Berkeley, Jefferson

Highway system
- West Virginia State Highway System; Interstate; US; State
← WV 114	→ US 119

West Virginia Route 115 (WV 115) is a state highway running north to south in West Virginia's Eastern Panhandle. The southern terminus of the route is at WV 9 near Mannings. The northern terminus is near WV 9 near Baker Heights at an intersection with Opequon Lane. The route mostly follows a previous alignment of WV 9.

== Route description ==
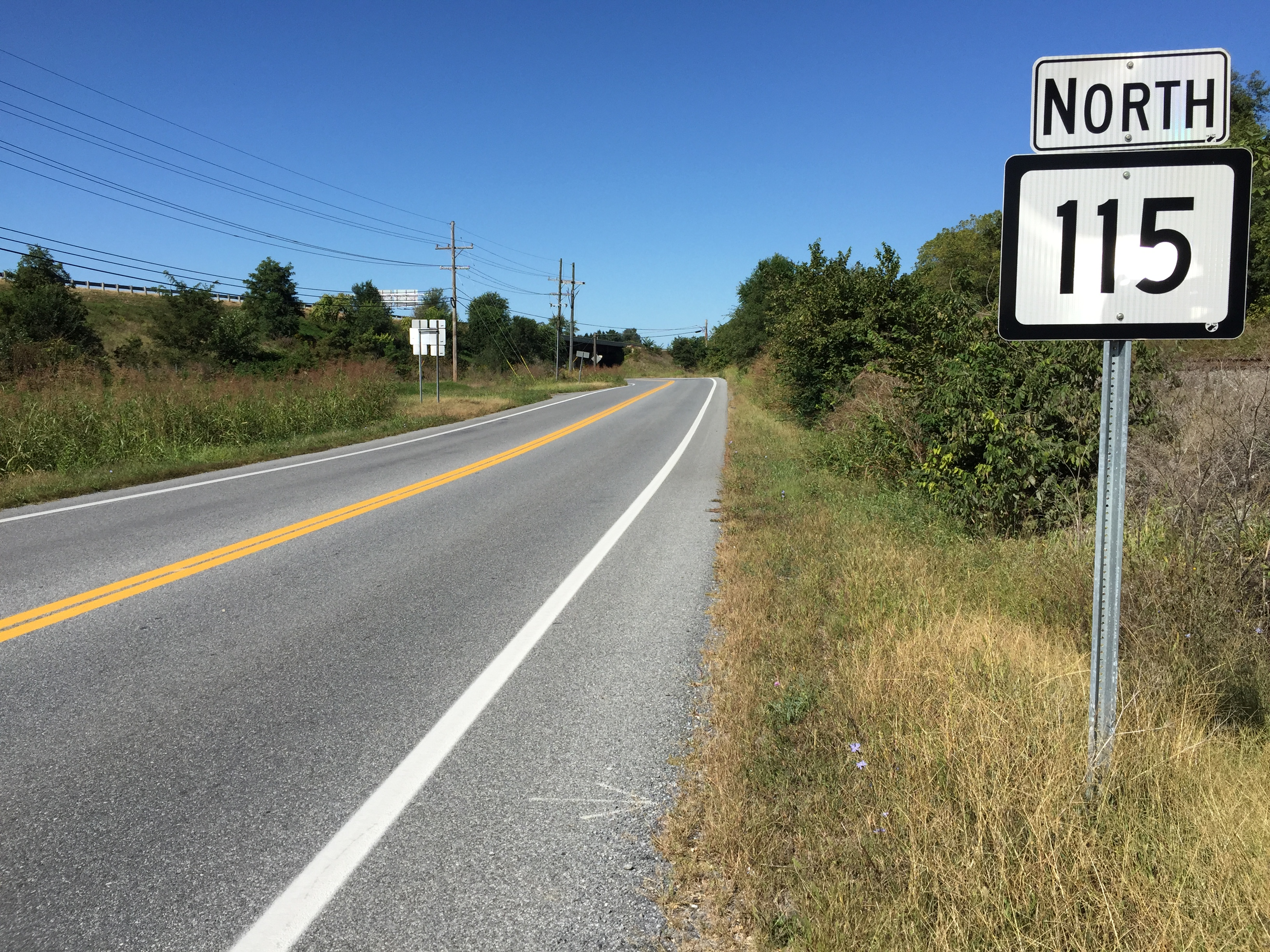
View north along WV 115 at CR 8 in Ranson

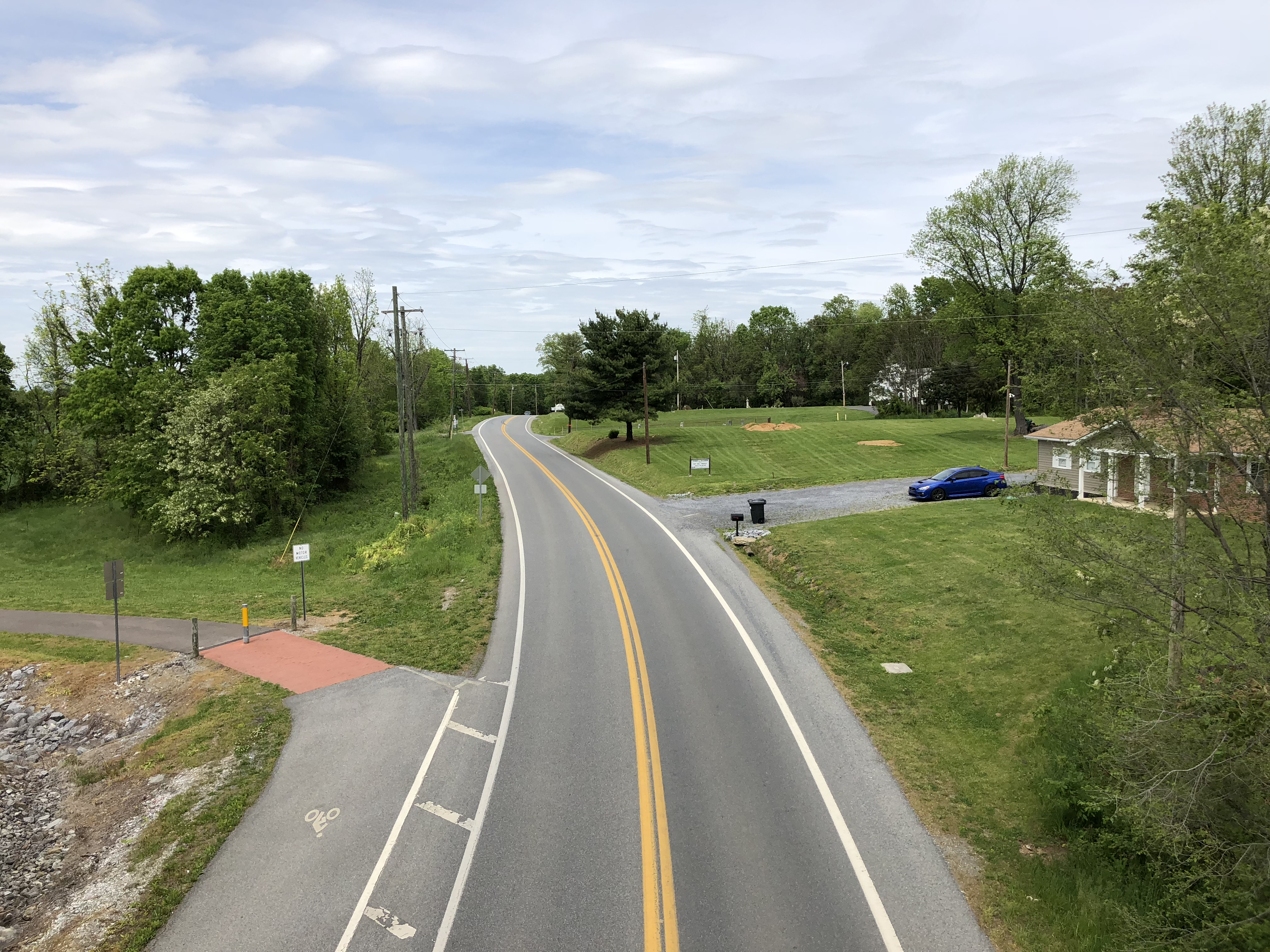
View north along WV 115 from WV 9 in Kearneysville

WV 115 starts at WV 9/CR 32 (Chestnut Hill Road) at the Virginia state line near Keyes Gap, although it is unsigned at this intersection. It travels through the communities of Mannings and Mountain Mission and goes north of Shannondale before crossing the Shenandoah River and traveling through Mechanicstown. WV 115 has an interchange with U.S. Route 340 (US 340) before entering Charles Town, where it intersects WV 51. North of Ranson, it parallels WV 9 before crossing under it in Bardane. It travels through Kearneysville, where it intersects WV 480's southern terminus, before the route has a final interchange with WV 9 near Baker Heights. WV 115 continues for 750 feet (230 m) to end at Opequon Lane.

== History ==
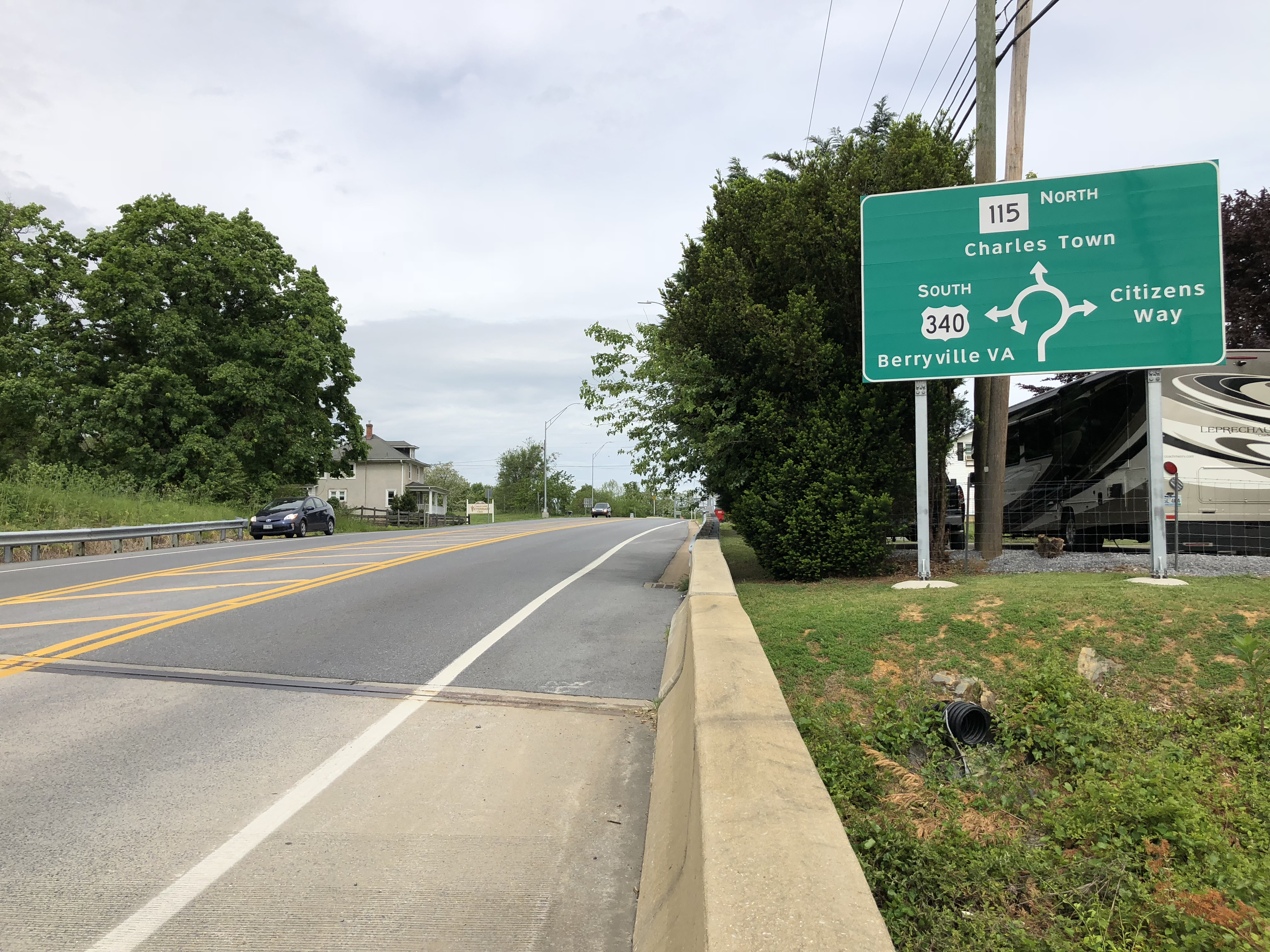
WV 115 northbound at US 340 in Charles Town

When the Charles Town bypass was built between April 1996 and March 1997, the designations of U.S. 340 and WV 9 were moved to the new four-lane highway. As a result, WV 115 was created to run along the old WV 9 through Charles Town. As the new WV 9 four-lane between Charles Town and Martinsburg was built, WV 115 was extended north to Baker Heights, but wasn't signed until around 2014–2015. Finally in November 2012, a new four-lane highway between Charles Town and the Virginia state line near Keyes Gap was constructed and assigned to WV 9, which extended WV 115 through its old, curvy alignment. WV 115 is currently not signed from the four-way intersection at the state line, but is signed at the U.S. 340/WV 115 intersection, which gained a roundabout in August 2017.

== Major intersections ==
County	Location	mi	km	Destinations	Notes
Jefferson	Keyes Gap	0.00	0.00	WV 9 / CR 32 (Chestnut Hill Road) – Charles Town, Leesburg, VA	Southern terminus
Jefferson	Charles Town	6.07– 6.26	9.77– 10.07	US 340 to WV 9 / CR 969 (Hillside Drive) / CR 1154 (Citizens Way) – Harpers Ferry, Martinsburg, Berryville, VA	Interchange; roundabout at ramps to US 340 south / CR 115/4
Jefferson	Charles Town	7.70	12.39	WV 51 (Washington Street)	
Jefferson		12.78– 12.83	20.57– 20.65	WV 9 – Charles Town, Martinsburg	Interchange
Jefferson	Kearneysville	15.28	24.59	WV 480 north (Kearneysville Pike) / CR 1 (Leetown Road) to WV 9	Southern terminus of WV 480
Berkeley	Baker Heights	18.89– 18.98	30.40– 30.55	WV 9 – Martinsburg, Charles Town	Interchange
Berkeley	Baker Heights	19.12	30.77	CR 917 (Opequon Lane)	Northern terminus
1.000 mi = 1.609 km; 1.000 km = 0.621 mi
