= Jacks–Manning Farm =

Historic house in West Virginia, United States

- U.S. National Register of Historic Places
- Location within West Virginia Location within the United States
- Nearest city: Charles Town, West Virginia
- Coordinates: 39°16′8″N 77°51′38″W
- Built: 1840
- Architectural style: Greek Revival
- NRHP reference No.: 84003594
- Added to NRHP: January 12, 1984

The Jacks–Manning Farm, also known as the Vinton Farm, was built around 1840 for Robert Jacks near Charles Town, West Virginia, in the Greek Revival style. Jacks had married Julia Davenport, a member of a prominent Jefferson County family. Their daughter, Rebecca Jacks, married Thomas J. Manning, and the property has remained in the hands of descendants of the Manning family.
