= Riverside, Jefferson County, West Virginia =

- Unincorporated community
- Location within West Virginia Location within the United States
- Coordinates: 39°10′24″N 77°51′22″W
- Country: United States
- State: West Virginia
- County: Jefferson
- Time zone: UTC-5 (Eastern (EST))
  - Summer (DST): UTC-4 (EDT)
- GNIS feature ID: 1555487

Riverside is an unincorporated community on the eastern banks of the Shenandoah River in southern Jefferson County, West Virginia, United States.
