= Halltown Union Colored Sunday School =

- U.S. National Register of Historic Places
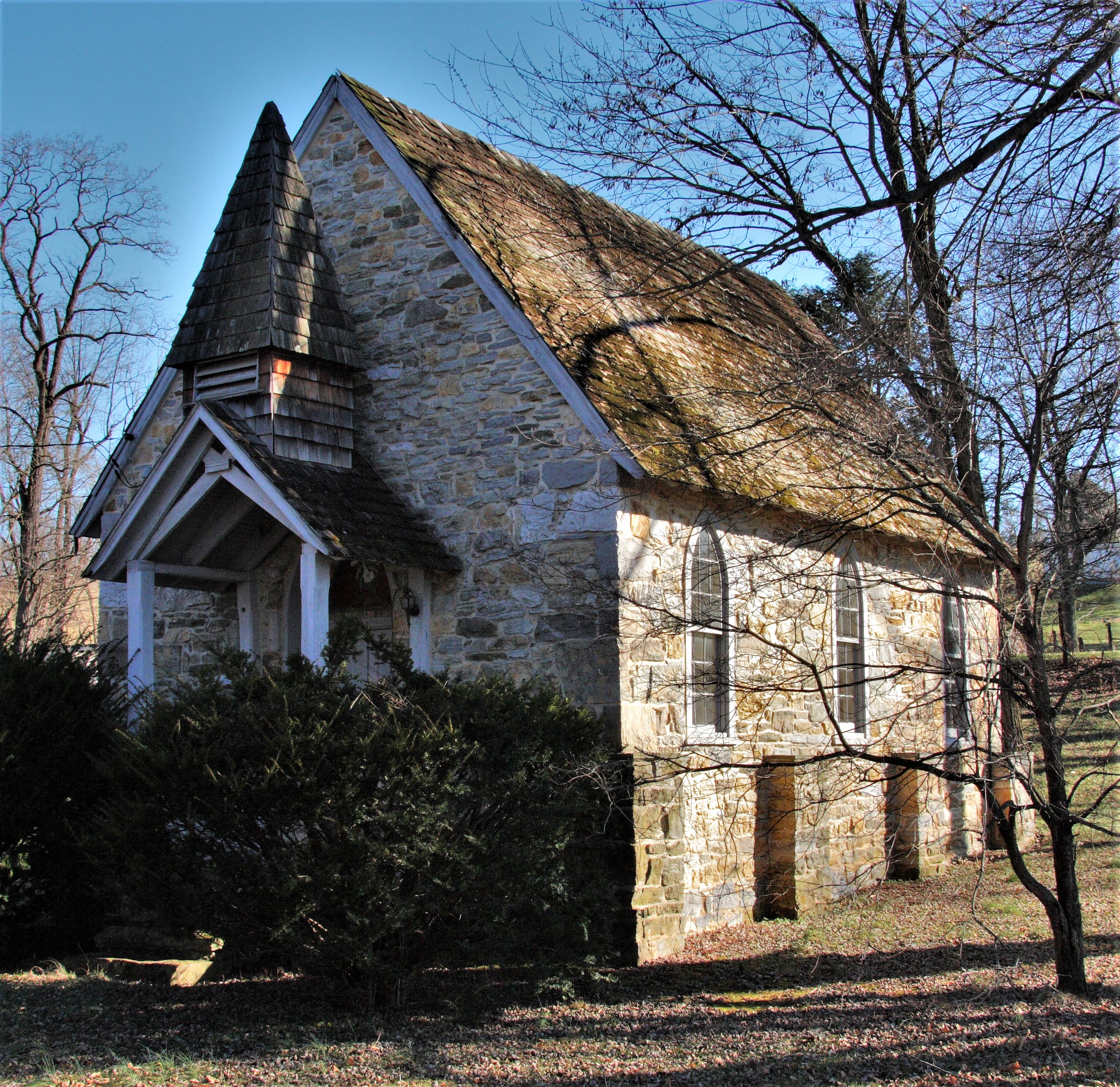
- Halltown Union Colored Sunday School, December 2008

- Location within West Virginia Location within the United States
- Location: Off US 340, Halltown, West Virginia
- Coordinates: 39°18′34″N 77°48′11″W
- Area: 0.2 acres (0.081 ha)
- Built: 1901
- Architectural style: Late Gothic Revival, Other, Vernacular Gothic Revival
- NRHP reference No.: 84003591
- Added to NRHP: January 12, 1984

The Halltown Union Colored Sunday School, also known as the Halltown Memorial Chapel, in Halltown, West Virginia, was built in 1901 in the Gothic Revival style. The stone chapel was built by and for the local African-American community on a small parcel of land donated by Daniel B. Lucas from his Rion Hall estate, next to the Halltown Colored Free School. The non-denominational Sunday School operated until 1967, although the building continued in use for weddings and funerals. In 1982 a committee was formed to restore the building, which was carried out the next year.

It was listed on the National Register of Historic Places in 1984.
