= Mechanicstown, West Virginia =

- Unincorporated community
- Location within West Virginia Location within the United States
- Coordinates: 39°15′38″N 77°49′46″W
- Country: United States
- State: West Virginia
- County: Jefferson
- Time zone: UTC-5 (Eastern (EST))
  - Summer (DST): UTC-4 (EDT)
- GNIS feature ID: 1555098

Mechanicstown is an unincorporated community in Jefferson County, West Virginia, United States. Mechanicstown lies on West Virginia Route 115 (Charles Town Road) at its intersection with County Route 25 (Kabletown Road) and County Route 9/3 (Cattail Run Road).
