= Land of Desire =

Book by William Leach

Land of Desire: Merchants: Power and the Rise of a New American Culture
- Author: William Leach
- Language: English
- Genre: Non-fiction
- Publisher: Random House
- Publication date: 1993
- Publication place: United States
- ISBN: 0-394-54350-5

Land of Desire is a book by William Leach about the development of consumer capitalism in the United States from 1890 to 1932. It was a National Book Award Finalist for 1993.

The title of the book comes from the statement by store owner John Wanamaker that "everyone who starts a new thing has to stand where Columbus did when he set sail. Few had faith that he could ever reach the land of desire."

== Synopsis ==
Land of Desire opens with the premise that American democracy shifted fundamentally after the Civil War as land ownership became concentrated in fewer hands and the population moved to cities to become wage laborers. In the accompanying cultural transformation money gained importance as the good life came to be defined no longer by control over production but by the power to consume (pp. 3–8). The emphasis shifted away from home, family, and self-reliance and towards standard of living, comfort, and luxury. This new mentality permeated all parts of society, including religious traditions, which adapted to the new mode of capitalism despite pockets of resistance.

=== Economic change ===
The rise in consumption was preceded by a rise in mass production in which factory size increased dramatically and large corporations began to dominate the economic landscape. Suddenly overproduction became a real concern, and the corporations had to focus on finding new markets for their products (pp. 15–19).

Stores in the nineteenth century were generally small, with Alexander Turney Stewart's "marble palace" an exception. However, Tunney sold mostly dry goods, in wholesale quantities. Department stores appeared in the 1880s, first in New York and Chicago. Within a few decades these had become large and powerful, and had overcome some organized attempts to resist their dominance over local retail markets. The biggest names in the business were John Wanamaker (Wanamaker's), Marshall Field (Marshall Field's), "Department-Store Napoleon" Henry Siegel (Siegel-Cooper Company), Edward and Lincoln Filene (Filene's), and the Straus family—Isidor, Nathan, Percy and Jesse—of Macy's (pp. 20–35). (Leach explores the personal life of some of these figures, especially John Wanamaker—, whose Protestant faith Leach juxtaposes with his business strategies—and his son Rodman Wanamaker; pp. 191–224.)

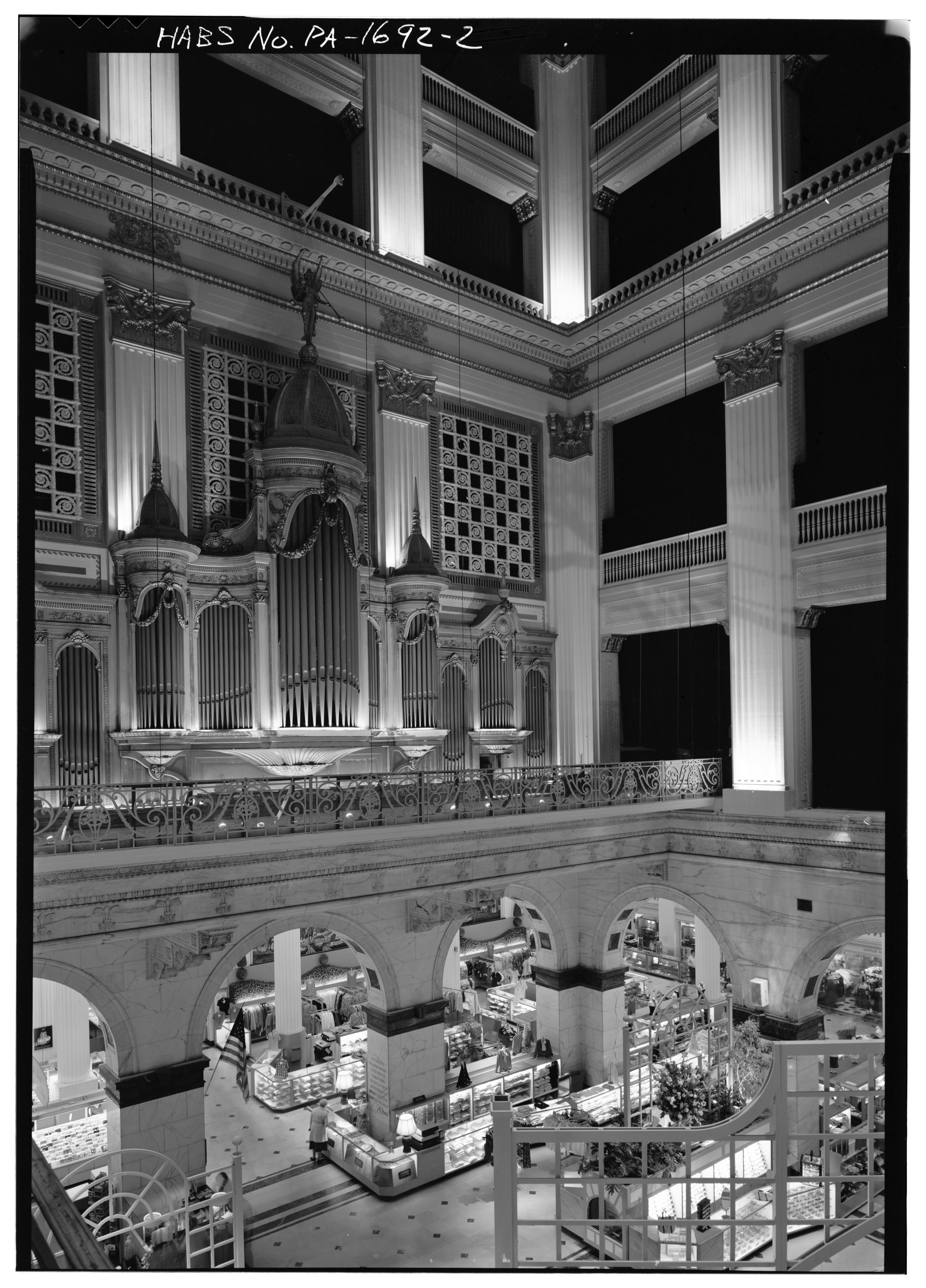
Interior of Wanamaker's in Philadelphia

As retailing increased in scope, so did service economy, including not only the staff of retail stores but also workers in the hospitality industry and other sites of consumption. Ellsworth Statler and Lucius Boomer both developed the ideology of service in the hotel chains they owned. Tipping became institutionalized as an incentive to good service and a symbol of the status and power of the customer. Easy credit arose as a lubricant for consumption, sometimes enabling unsupportable spending binges. In cases such as Wanamaker v. Weaver (1903) department stores sued husbands to force them to pay their wives' spending debts (pp. 123–134).

By the 1920s, financiers (Goldman, Sachs, Lehman Brothers, Paul Mazur) turned the large stores into even larger chains and corporations though mergers and acquisitions. (pp. 263–292).

=== Marketing and display ===
The book devotes considerable attention to Wizard of Oz author L. Frank Baum, a display window designer and nationally known expert on decoration. It discusses other window designers including Elbert Hubbard, Arthur Fraser, and Walter F. Allert, commercial artists such as Maxfield Parrish, Louis Tiffany, Joseph Urban, Boardman Robinson, and promoters of advertising such as Robert Ogden (pp. 39–70 and passim).

Store interiors became increasingly ornate and carefully planned. Merchandisers also differentiated their stores, with high-end areas for "the classes" and bargain basements for "the masses". Further differentiation brought cafeterias, tearooms, nurseries, concert halls, and theaters to draw shoppers and enhance their sense of well-being in the store. Architects incorporated elevators, escalators, and revolving doors for easy flow through the store. Designers used glass, mirrors, and lighting to increase the allure of goods and create feelings of depth. Decorators developed seasonally changing central themes based on holidays, mythology, orientalism, and other domains engaging the public imagination (pp. 71–84; 134–146).

The fashion industry helped to inspire desire for new clothing by promoting constantly-changing trends; fashion consulting and reporting became its own line of work (pp. 91–11; 308–317). Edward Bernays pioneered the public relations technique of generating news calculated to influence people's attitudes toward a show, product, or company (pp. 319–322). Commercial parades such as the Macy's Thanksgiving Day Parade drew on local traditions to create positive attention (pp. 323–328).

=== Child consumers ===
Marketing children's products and advertising them to children became a significant part of department store strategy. Thus, new fancifully-decorated "Children's Departments" were created to attract families and inspire desire for the commodities displayed therein (pp. 85–90). Sidonie Gruenberg and Joseph Jastrow spoke on the need of children to have 'their own things' in order to better develop their individual personalities, and allowances to learn how to spend; Gruenberg was made head of the Society for the Study of Child Nature and funded by the Rockefeller Foundation to promote these ideas, but recanted in 1934 with her book Parents, Children, and Money (pp. 328–330, 380)

Significant government apparatus also formed around children's issues, especially the U.S. Children's Bureau which engaged in collaborations with department stores (pp. 180–185).

=== Institutional coalitions ===
Part II of the book focuses on public–private partnerships and other institutional connections which helped to promote the culture of consumerism. These include the sponsorship of educational programs to produce advertising and decoration specialists (New York School of Fine and Applied Art) and retail specialists (New York University School of Retailing), as well as academic research institutes devoted to studying problems interesting to business (Harvard Bureau of Business Research, led by Edwin Francis Gay and Arch Wilkinson Shaw) (pp. 153–163). The book also discusses other professors who provided intellectual support of the consumerist movement and sometimes collaborated directly with the corporations involved. These include Emily Fogg Mead (mother of Margaret Mead), an early advocate of using advertising to stimulate mass desire (pp. 37, 48).

Museum curators Morris D'Camp Crawford (American Museum of Natural History), Stewart Culin (Brooklyn Museum), John Cotton Dana (Newark Museum), and Richard F. Bach (Metropolitan Museum of Art) formed partnerships with business to develop designs based on museum artifacts and to use museum spaces for exhibitions of marketable contemporary work (pp. 164–173; 324–326).

Leach discusses the "mind cure" philosophy (including New Thought, Unity Church, Christian Science, and theosophy) as an auxiliary to consumerism. He focuses on economics professor Simon Patten, whose philosophy of limitless desires he places within this movement (225–260).

He cites a performance associated with the 1913 Paterson silk strike, organized by John Reed and Robert Edmond Jones as a paradoxical example of labor radicalism coopted by the emerging aesthetic of spectacle (pp. 185–190).

=== Government ===
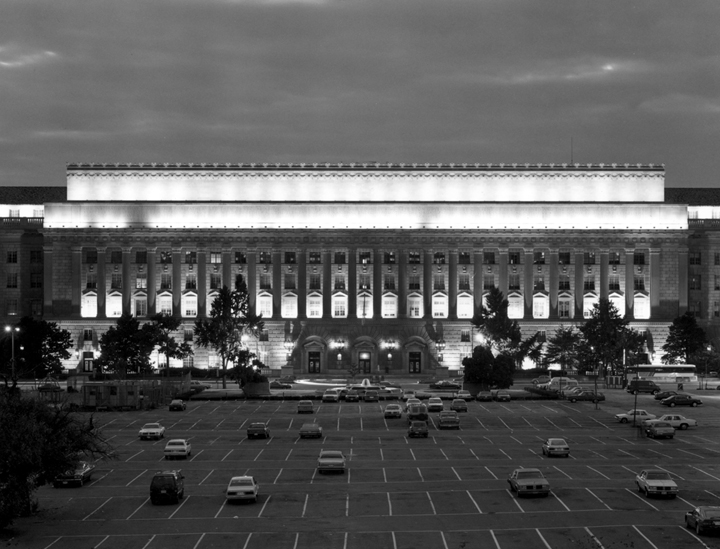
Leach argues that the creation of the massive Department of Commerce building in 1927 reflected the government's commitment to serve the growing corporate sector.

New federal agencies, especially the Department of Commerce and Department of Labor (at first together as United States Department of Commerce and Labor) reflected new economic needs (pp. 176–180). Herbert Hoover promoted advertising and the expansion of consumer desire in his eight years as Secretary of Commerce (during which he created the Bureau of Foreign and Domestic Commerce) and then as President (pp. 349–378).

Department stores cultivated great influence with local governments and typically succeeded in their plans for urban renewal or redesign (pp. 173–176). Fifth Avenue and Seventh Avenue in New York were redesigned to serve specific commercial purposes, with minimized interference of garment workers with the comfortable shopping environment (pp. 292–294). Times Square with its billboards and electric lighting exemplified the new consumer ideology (pp. 338–348).

== Reception ==
Richard Bushman wrote that Leach's "gloomy picture could have been made darker still if the nineteenth-century origins of consumer culture figured more in the book", describing how consumption of goods such as furniture was motivated by the desire to project gentility and emulate higher classes. Bushman suggests also that Leach may have overemphasized the statements of advertisers and department store owners, without scrutinizing how completely the ambition to manage desire had been realized among the masses.

Elliott J. Gorn wrote that "Leach is at his best when he focuses on particular details" such as the use of glass in store displays and urban design. Gorn found the book's tone overly critical, "ponderous" and "heavy-handed" at times "because the author is at such pains to debunk the culture of consumption". Thomas D. Beal, however, felt that "unlike many recent studies, Leach's work neither praises nor condemns this secular culture, but provides new insights into the ways it gradually became a way of seeing and organizing American society."

Alan Trachtenberg also praised the book for its details, writing "Leach has gathered material and biographical evidence from virtually every realm of public life in these years (roughly 1890 to 1930) to document a cultural shift of monumental proportions. In no other recent work on the rise of commercial culture do we find anything like the array of data regarding how the change came about, how it looked, and how it felt to its advocates and critics alike." He wrote that if the book has any flaw, it is its failure to further investigate the failure of existing American cultural traditions to respond critically to consumer culture.

== Bibliographic information ==
William Leach. Land of Desire: Merchants: Power and the Rise of a New American Culture. New York: Vintage Books (Random House), 1993. ISBN 0-394-54350-5.
