= Johnsontown, Jefferson County, West Virginia =

- Unincorporated community
- Location within West Virginia Location within the United States
- Coordinates: 39°20′20″N 77°53′13″W
- Country: United States
- State: West Virginia
- County: Jefferson
- Time zone: UTC-5 (Eastern (EST))
  - Summer (DST): UTC-4 (EDT)
- GNIS feature ID: 1549762

Johnsontown is an unincorporated community in Jefferson County, West Virginia, United States.
