= Mannings, West Virginia =

- Unincorporated community
- Location within West Virginia Location within the United States
- Coordinates: 39°14′43″N 77°46′51″W
- Country: United States
- State: West Virginia
- County: Jefferson
- Time zone: UTC-5 (Eastern (EST))
  - Summer (DST): UTC-4 (EDT)
- GNIS feature ID: 1542720

Mannings is an unincorporated community in Jefferson County, West Virginia, United States. Mannings lies along West Virginia Route 115 on the western flanks of the Blue Ridge Mountains near the Virginia state line.

In both 2009 and 2013, a petition compiled by a developer asking for the community to be incorporated as a town was denied by the Jefferson County Commission.

== Local attractions ==
The Appalachian Trail runs nearby, with a trailhead at Keyes Gap.
