= Jefferson County, West Virginia =

County in West Virginia, United States

- County
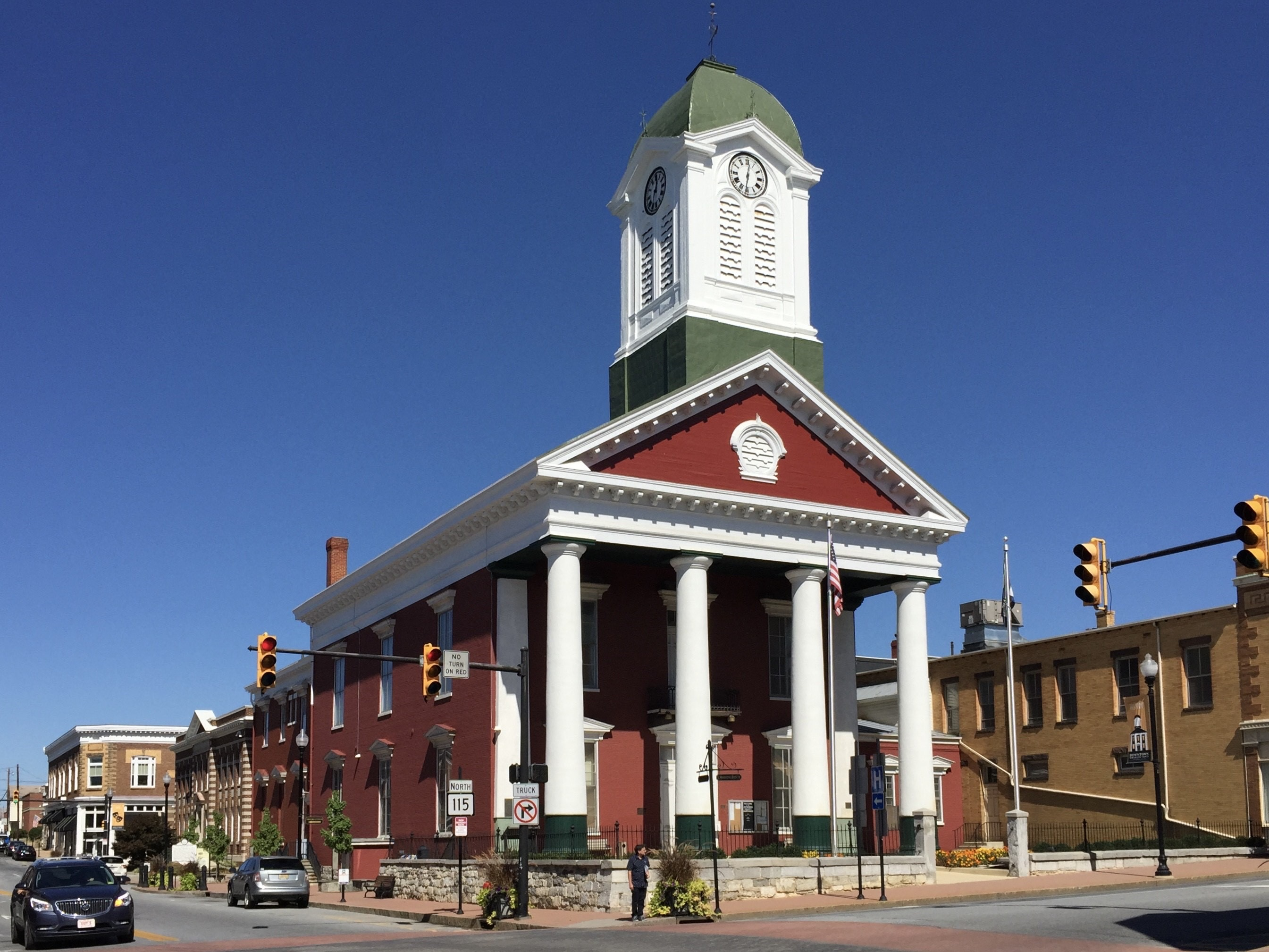
- Jefferson County Courthouse in Charles Town

- Seal

- Location within the U.S. state of West Virginia
- Coordinates: 39°19′N 77°52′W
- Country: United States
- State: West Virginia
- Founded: October 26, 1801
- Named for: Thomas Jefferson
- Seat: Charles Town
- Largest city: Charles Town

Area
  - Total: 212 sq mi (550 km^{2})
  - Land: 210 sq mi (540 km^{2})
  - Water: 2.0 sq mi (5.2 km^{2}) 1.0%

Population (2020)
  - Total: 57,701
  - Estimate (2025): 63,102 ▲
  - Density: 270/sq mi (110/km^{2})
- Time zone: UTC−5 (Eastern)
  - Summer (DST): UTC−4 (EDT)
- Congressional district: 2nd
- Website: jeffersoncountywv.org

Jefferson County is the easternmost county in the U.S. state of West Virginia. It is located in the Shenandoah Valley in the eastern panhandle of West Virginia. As of the 2020 census, the population was 57,701. Its county seat is Charles Town. The county was founded in 1801, and today is part of the Washington metropolitan area.

== History ==
=== Formation ===
Jefferson County was established on October 26, 1801 from Berkeley County because the citizens of southeastern Berkeley County felt they had to travel too far to the county seat of Martinsburg. Charles Washington, the founder of Charles Town and brother to George Washington, petitioned for a new county to be formed. It was named for Thomas Jefferson, author of the Declaration of Independence and third President of the United States. Virginia previously had a Jefferson County, which is now part of Kentucky. Accordingly, in the State records of Virginia, there are listings for Jefferson County from 1780 to 1792 and Jefferson County from 1801 to 1863, neither of which are still in Virginia.

=== John Brown rebellion ===
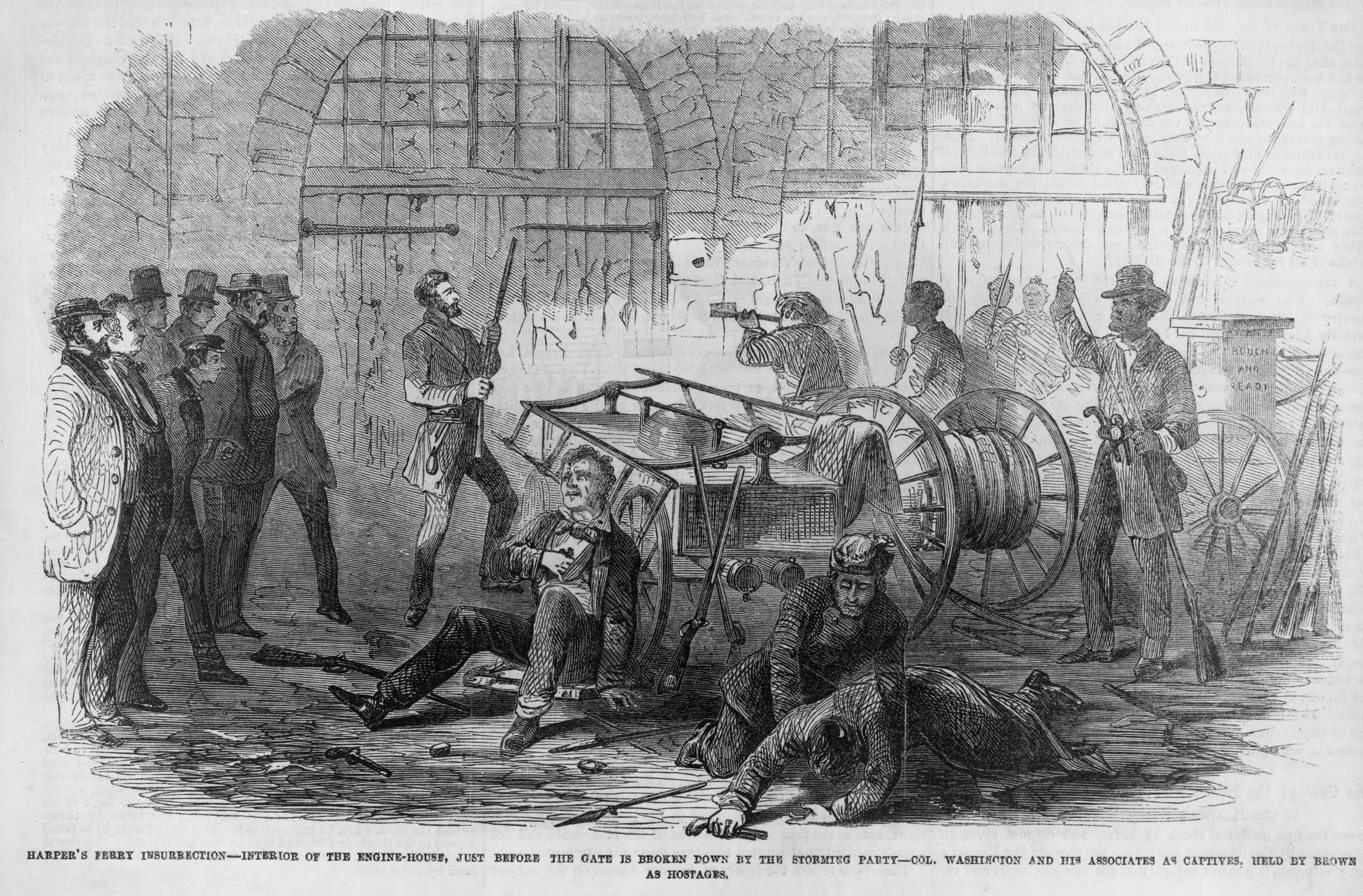
Coverage of John Brown's raid in Frank Leslie's illustrated newspaper, v. 8, no. 205 (November 5, 1859), p. 359

The county's courthouse was the site of the trial for the abolitionist John Brown after his October 1859 raid on the federal armory in Harpers Ferry. Some 90 U.S. Marines serving under then Army Colonel Robert E. Lee and Lieutenants J.E.B. Stuart and Israel Greene put down the rebellion.

Brown was sentenced to death for murder, treason against the Commonwealth of Virginia, and conspiring with slaves to rebel. On December 2, 1859, John Brown was taken from the Charles Town jail a short distance to an open field and hanged. Among those attending the Brown execution was a contingent of 1500 cadets from Virginia Military Institute sent by the Governor of Virginia Henry A. Wise under the supervision of Major William Gilham and Major Thomas J. Jackson. In the ranks of a Richmond militia company stood John Wilkes Booth. Walt Whitman was also present.

=== Civil War ===
The county was a frequent site of conflict during the Civil War, as Union and Confederate lines moved back and forth along the Shenandoah Valley. Some towns in the county changed hands between the Union and Confederacy over a dozen times, including Charles Town, and especially Harpers Ferry.

Jefferson County is the only part of modern-day West Virginia not exempted from the effects of the Emancipation Proclamation (as Berkeley County and the 48 counties designated as West Virginia had been). Slaves in the county thus were legally free as of January 1, 1863.

The Jefferson County Courthouse is the only courthouse in America to have held two treason trials: the trial of John Brown in 1859 and a trial arising from the Battle of Blair Mountain labor rebellion.

=== Joining West Virginia ===
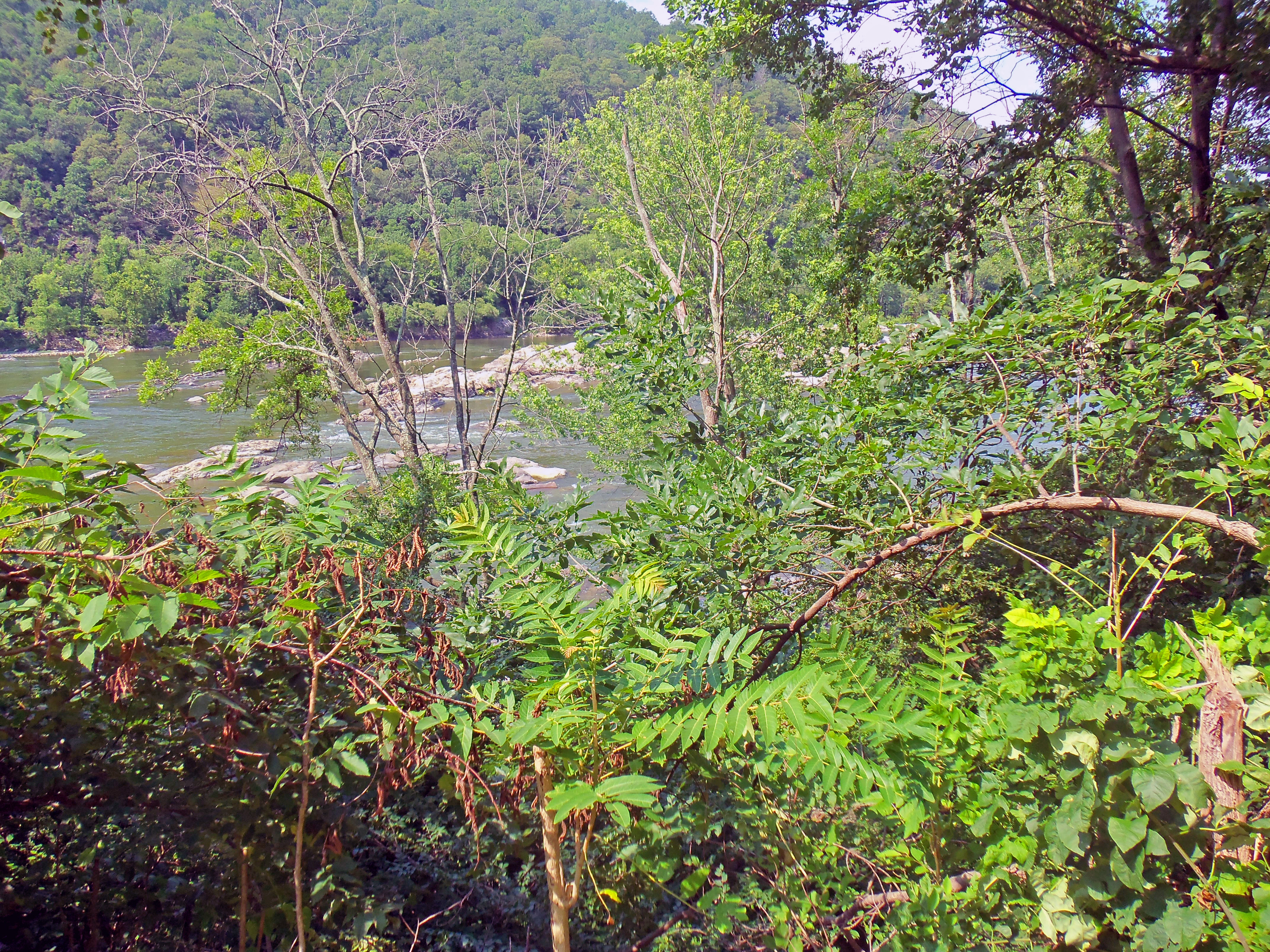
Tripoint of Virginia, West Virginia, and Maryland in the Potomac River region of Harper's Ferry, the lowest point in West Virginia

Jefferson County had voted for secession in the vote taken on May 23, 1861. However, Jefferson County, along with Berkeley County, both counties lying on the Potomac River in the Shenandoah Valley, with the consent of the Reorganized Government of Virginia voted in favor of annexation to West Virginia in 1863. Virginia tried to nullify this after the American Civil War, but the counties remained part of West Virginia.

The question of the constitutionality of the formation of the new state was brought before the Supreme Court of the United States in the following manner: Berkeley and Jefferson County, West Virginia, counties lying on the Potomac east of the mountains, in 1863, with the consent of the Reorganized Government of Virginia, had supposedly voted in favor of annexation to West Virginia. However, many voters were absent in the Confederate Army when the vote was taken and they refused to accept the transfer upon their return. The Virginia General Assembly repealed the Act of Secession and in 1866 brought suit against West Virginia, asking the Supreme Court to declare the counties still part of Virginia. Congress, on March 10, 1866, passed a joint resolution recognizing the transfer. In 1871, the U.S. Supreme Court decided Virginia v. West Virginia, upholding the "secession" of West Virginia, including Berkeley and Jefferson counties, from Virginia. In 2011, West Virginia state delegate Larry Kump sponsored legislation to allow Morgan, Berkeley, and Jefferson counties to rejoin Virginia by popular vote.

=== County subdivisions ===
In 1863, West Virginia's counties were divided into civil townships, with the intention of encouraging local government. This proved impractical in the heavily rural state, and in 1872 the townships were converted into magisterial districts. Jefferson County was initially divided into five townships, which became magisterial districts in 1872: Averill, Bolivar, Chapline, Grant, and Shepherd. In 1873, Averill District was renamed "Middleway", Chapline became "Potomac", and Grant District became "Charlestown". (Note: Spelled "Charles Town" by 1900.) Two additional districts, Harpers Ferry (Note: Originally spelled "Harper's Ferry".) and Osburn, were created during the 1870s. In the 1880s, Bolivar District was annexed by Harpers Ferry; Potomac and Shepherd were consolidated into Shepherdstown District, and Osburn was renamed "Kabletown".

=== Rural Free Delivery ===
In October 1896, Jefferson County became the first county in the United States to begin Rural Free Delivery service in the towns of Halltown and Uvilla.

=== Modern History ===
In the 21st century Jefferson County is one of the only counties in West Virginia that has experienced large scale population and economic growth, while the rest of the state has decreased in population. This is primarily due to its proximity to Northern Virginia and the Washington metropolitan area resulting in many individuals living in Jefferson and working in DC or Northern Virginia, due to a lower cost of living.

== Geography ==

According to the U.S. Census Bureau, the county has a total area of 212 square miles (550 km^{2}), of which 210 square miles (540 km^{2}) is land and 2.0 square miles (5.2 km^{2}) (1.0%) is water. It is the only West Virginia county where the Blue Ridge Mountains and Shenandoah River can be found, as referenced in West Virginia's state song, "Take Me Home, Country Roads" by John Denver. The lowest point in the state of West Virginia is located on the Potomac River (just east of Harpers Ferry) in Jefferson County, where it flows out of West Virginia and into Virginia.

=== National protected area ===
- Harpers Ferry National Historical Park (part)

=== Rivers and streams ===
- Potomac River
  - Opequon Creek
- Shenandoah River

=== Adjacent counties ===
- Washington County, Maryland (north)
- Loudoun County, Virginia (east)
- Clarke County, Virginia (southwest)
- Berkeley County (northwest)

=== Major highways ===
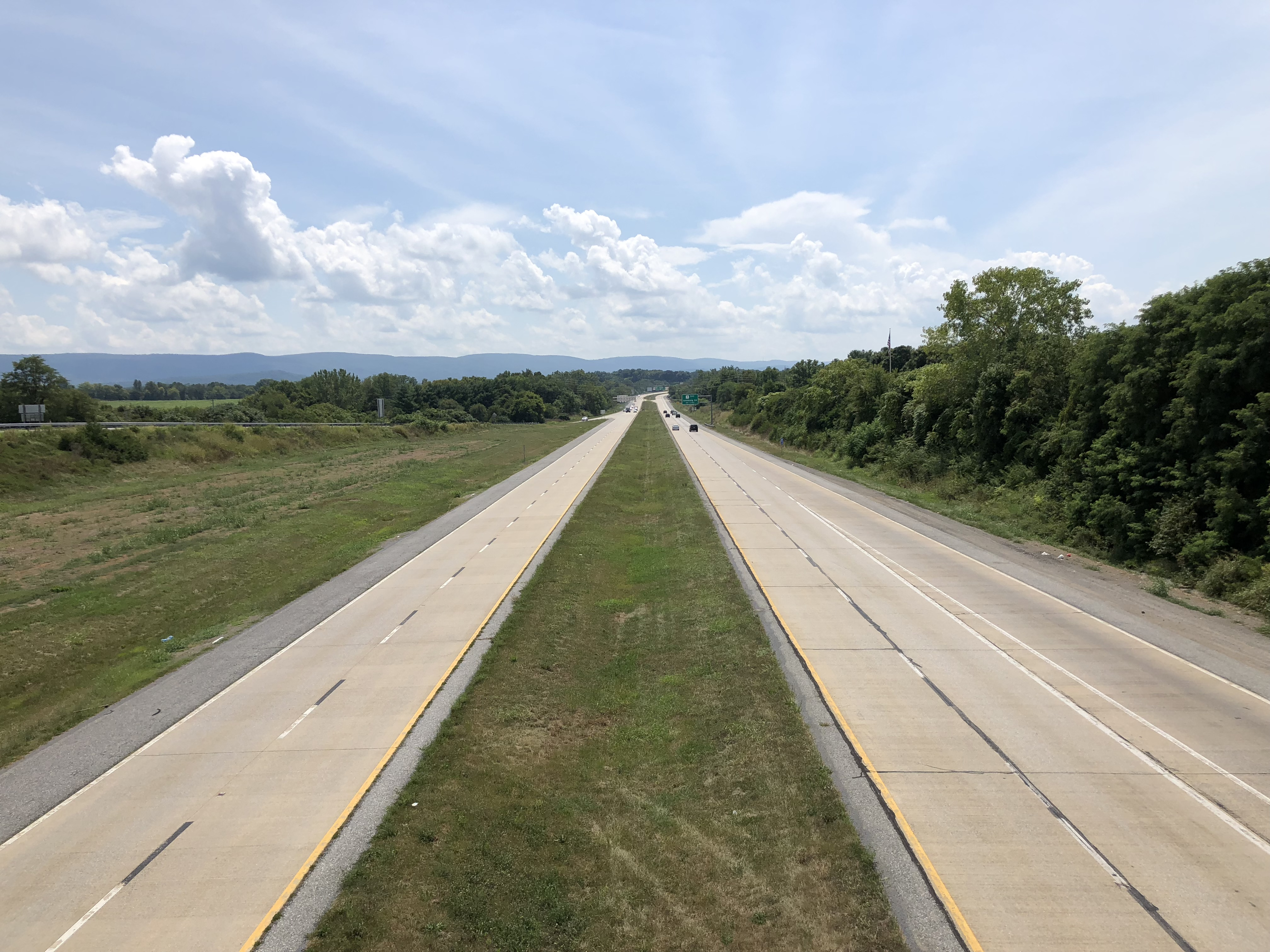
US 340 and WV Route 9 run concurrently for a few miles in Charles Town

- U.S. Highway 340
- West Virginia Route 9
- West Virginia Route 45
- West Virginia Route 51
- West Virginia Route 115 (Old West Virginia Route 9)
- West Virginia Route 230

== Demographics ==
Historical population
Census	Pop.	Note	%±
1810	11,851		—
1820	13,087		10.4%
1830	12,927		−1.2%
1840	14,082		8.9%
1850	15,357		9.1%
1860	14,535		−5.4%
1870	13,219		−9.1%
1880	15,005		13.5%
1890	15,553		3.7%
1900	15,935		2.5%
1910	15,889		−0.3%
1920	15,729		−1.0%
1930	15,780		0.3%
1940	16,762		6.2%
1950	17,184		2.5%
1960	18,665		8.6%
1970	21,280		14.0%
1980	30,302		42.4%
1990	35,926		18.6%
2000	42,190		17.4%
2010	53,498		26.8%
2020	57,701		7.9%
2025 (est.)	63,102	▲	9.4%
U.S. Decennial Census; 1790–1960 1900–1990; 1990–2000 2010–2020

=== 2020 census ===
As of the 2020 census, there were 57,701 people, 21,902 households, and 23,762 housing units in the county. The population was 22.1% under the age of 18 and 17.4% were 65 years of age or older; the median age was 41.7 years. For every 100 females there were 97.9 males, and for every 100 females age 18 and over there were 96.9 males.

The racial makeup of the county was 81.2% White, 6.0% Black or African American, 0.2% American Indian and Alaska Native, 1.5% Asian, 2.9% from some other race, and 8.2% from two or more races. Hispanic or Latino residents of any race comprised 7.2% of the population.

There were 21,902 households, of which 31.3% had children under the age of 18 living with them, 53.6% were married couples living together, 22.4% had a female householder with no spouse or partner present, and 17.1% had a male householder with no spouse present. About 25.1% of all households were made up of individuals and 10.7% had someone living alone who was 65 years of age or older. The average household and family size was 3.15.

There were 23,762 housing units, of which 7.8% were vacant. Among occupied housing units, 77.9% were owner-occupied and 22.1% were renter-occupied. The homeowner vacancy rate was 1.4% and the rental vacancy rate was 6.6%.

The median income for a household was $86,711 and the poverty rate was 9.7%.

Jefferson County, West Virginia – Racial and ethnic composition Note: the US Census treats Hispanic/Latino as an ethnic category. This table excludes Latinos from the racial categories and assigns them to a separate category. Hispanics/Latinos may be of any race.
Race / Ethnicity (NH = Non-Hispanic)	Pop 2000	Pop 2010	Pop 2020	% 2000	% 2010	% 2020
White alone (NH)	37,958	45,565	45,784	89.96%	85.17%	79.34%
Black or African American alone (NH)	2,539	3,445	3,379	6.01%	6.43%	5.85%
Native American or Alaska Native alone (NH)	109	115	104	0.25%	0.21%	0.18%
Asian alone (NH)	250	605	817	0.59%	1.13%	1.41%
Pacific Islander alone (NH)	15	30	10	0.03%	0.05%	0.01%
Other race alone (NH)	61	78	304	0.14%	0.14%	0.52%
Mixed race or Multiracial (NH)	524	1,171	3,166	1.24%	2.18%	5.48%
Hispanic or Latino (any race)	734	2,489	4,137	1.73%	4.65%	7.16%
Total	42,190	53,498	57,701	100.00%	100.00%	100.00%

=== 2010 census ===
As of the 2010 U.S. census, there were 53,498 people, 19,931 households, and 13,971 families residing in the county. The population density was 255.2 inhabitants per square mile (98.5/km^{2}). There were 22,037 housing units at an average density of 105.1 per square mile (40.6/km^{2}). The racial makeup of the county was 87.6% white, 6.6% black or African American, 1.2% Asian, 0.2% American Indian, 0.1% Pacific islander, 1.8% from other races, and 2.6% from two or more races. Those of Hispanic or Latino origin made up 4.7% of the population. In terms of ancestry, 25.9% were German, 17.3% were English, 12.1% were Irish, and 6.6% were American.

Of the 19,931 households, 34.6% had children under the age of 18 living with them, 54.9% were married couples living together, 10.1% had a female householder with no husband present, 29.9% were non-families, and 22.7% of all households were made up of individuals. The average household size was 2.61 and the average family size was 3.07. The median age was 38.9 years.

The median income for a household in the county was $65,603 and the median income for a family was $77,185. Males had a median income of $54,959 versus $36,782 for females. The per capita income for the county was $29,733. About 4.4% of families and 8.4% of the population were below the poverty line, including 10.9% of those under age 18 and 6.9% of those age 65 or over.

== Government ==
=== Law enforcement ===
The Jefferson County Sheriff's Department provides law enforcement services in the county, and handles all 911 emergency and non emergency calls. In February 2007, Jefferson County Sheriff's Department Corporal Ronald Fletcher was shot and critically wounded during a stand-off at the residence of the girlfriend of a suspect, Dorsey Cox. Cox had been at his girlfriend's house retrieving personal items in violation of a court-ordered protective order. As Corporal Fletcher approached the house, Cox fled inside and subsequently shot Corporal Fletcher four times, one of which struck the officer in the chest. The State Police's SWAT team entered the house. Cox was later found dead of an apparent self-inflicted gunshot wound.

On June 5, 2012, Sheriff Robert Shirley was indicted on one count of deprivation of rights under color of law and one count of destruction, falsification or alteration of a record in a federal investigation. He is alleged to have beaten Mark Daniel Haines, who later pleaded guilty to bank robbery, during his arrest on December 27, 2010. He is also alleged to have altered a use of force report while the incident was under investigation by the Federal Bureau of Investigation. Shirley and 14 other "John Doe" law enforcement officers were also the subject of a civil rights lawsuit filed by Haines. The lawsuit alleges that Shirley and the other officers used excessive force while arresting Haines. Shirley pled guilty to federal civil rights charges of and was sentenced to a year in prison.

=== Politics ===
Jefferson County has been a Republican-leaning county in the 21st century, although Barack Obama carried it in the 2008 presidential election. The county is part of the Washington metropolitan area, making it less heavily Republican than most counties in West Virginia.

For much of the 20th century, the county trended strongly Democratic due to historical sympathies for Confederate Virginia. In contrast to its rock-ribbed Unionist and Republican Eastern Panhandle sister Morgan County, Jefferson did not vote Republican until Dwight D. Eisenhower won by 27 votes in 1956, and afterwards voted Republican only in the 1972 and 1984 landslides, and in 1988.

Despite its strong support for Republican presidential candidates in recent years, local Democrats still have success in Jefferson County. Even as recently as 2018, Senator Joe Manchin won the county in his successful reelection, despite the county being the home of his opponent, Patrick Morrisey. In 2026, Democrat Rachel Fetty Anderson won the county with 50.3% of the vote against Republican incumbent Shelley Moore Capito.

United States presidential election results for Jefferson County, West Virginia
Year	Republican		Democratic		Third party(ies)	
Year	No.	%	No.	%	No.	%
1912	993	26.66%	2,525	67.79%	207	5.56%
1916	1,181	31.33%	2,544	67.50%	44	1.17%
1920	2,168	35.27%	3,944	64.16%	35	0.57%
1924	1,870	29.07%	4,368	67.90%	195	3.03%
1928	3,050	47.78%	3,312	51.88%	22	0.34%
1932	1,734	24.36%	5,350	75.15%	35	0.49%
1936	2,040	27.20%	5,443	72.56%	18	0.24%
1940	2,332	30.57%	5,297	69.43%	0	0.00%
1944	2,103	35.83%	3,767	64.17%	0	0.00%
1948	2,199	36.60%	3,797	63.19%	13	0.22%
1952	3,134	43.71%	4,036	56.29%	0	0.00%
1956	3,380	50.20%	3,353	49.80%	0	0.00%
1960	2,887	39.88%	4,352	60.12%	0	0.00%
1964	1,901	27.98%	4,892	72.02%	0	0.00%
1968	2,718	39.23%	3,129	45.16%	1,082	15.62%
1972	4,822	63.41%	2,782	36.59%	0	0.00%
1976	3,864	42.79%	5,166	57.21%	0	0.00%
1980	4,454	45.37%	4,679	47.66%	685	6.98%
1984	5,884	58.06%	4,216	41.60%	34	0.34%
1988	5,349	55.00%	4,334	44.56%	43	0.44%
1992	4,656	38.21%	5,363	44.01%	2,166	17.78%
1996	5,287	40.46%	6,361	48.68%	1,420	10.87%
2000	7,045	49.00%	6,860	47.71%	473	3.29%
2004	10,539	52.71%	9,301	46.52%	153	0.77%
2008	10,600	46.78%	11,687	51.58%	372	1.64%
2012	11,258	50.63%	10,398	46.76%	580	2.61%
2016	13,204	53.88%	9,518	38.84%	1,786	7.29%
2020	15,033	54.26%	12,127	43.77%	545	1.97%
2024	16,573	56.84%	11,967	41.04%	616	2.11%

== Communities ==
=== Cities ===
- Charles Town (county seat)
- Ranson

=== Towns ===
- Bolivar
- Harpers Ferry
- Shepherdstown

=== Magisterial districts ===
- Charles Town
- Harpers Ferry
- Kabletown
- Middleway
- Shepherdstown

=== Census-designated places ===
- Middleway
- Shannondale
- Shenandoah Junction

=== Unincorporated communities ===
- Bakerton
- Bardane
- Blair
- Bloomery
- Blue Ridge Acres
- Browns Corner
- Duffields
- Egypt
- Engle
- Franklintown
- Halltown
- Jamestown
- Johnsontown
- Kabletown
- Kearneysville
- Keyes Ferry Acres
- Leetown
- Mannings
- Mechanicstown
- Mechlenberg Heights
- Meyerstown
- Millville
- Moler Crossroads
- Mountain Mission
- Reedson
- Rippon
- Riverside
- Silver Grove
- Skeetersville
- Summit Point
- Uvilla
- Wheatland

== Historic buildings and structures ==
- Middleway Historic District (1734)
- White House Farm (1740)
- Hopewell (Millville, West Virginia) (1765)
- Harewood (West Virginia) (1770)
- Mount Ellen (ca 1790)
- New Hopewell (1774), a farm comprising agricultural fields and historical buildings, located between Johnsontown and Leetown
- Happy Retreat (1780)
- Blakeley (West Virginia) (1820)
- Claymont Court (1820)
- Cedar Lawn (1825)
- Barleywood Manor (1846)
- Jacks-Manning Farm (Vinton Farm) (1848)
- John Brown's Fort (1848)
- Grace Episcopal Church (1851)
- Kabletown Church (1861)
- Brown Shugart House (1885)

=== Gallery ===
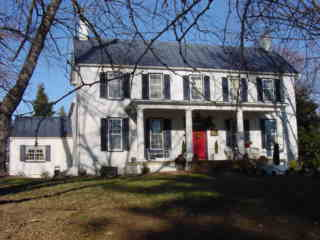
Mount Ellen

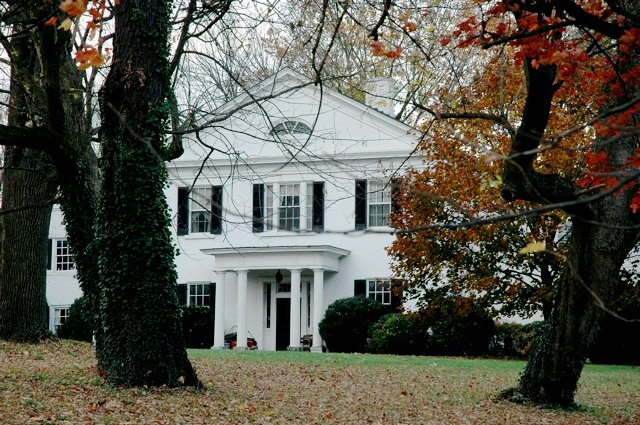
Happy Retreat

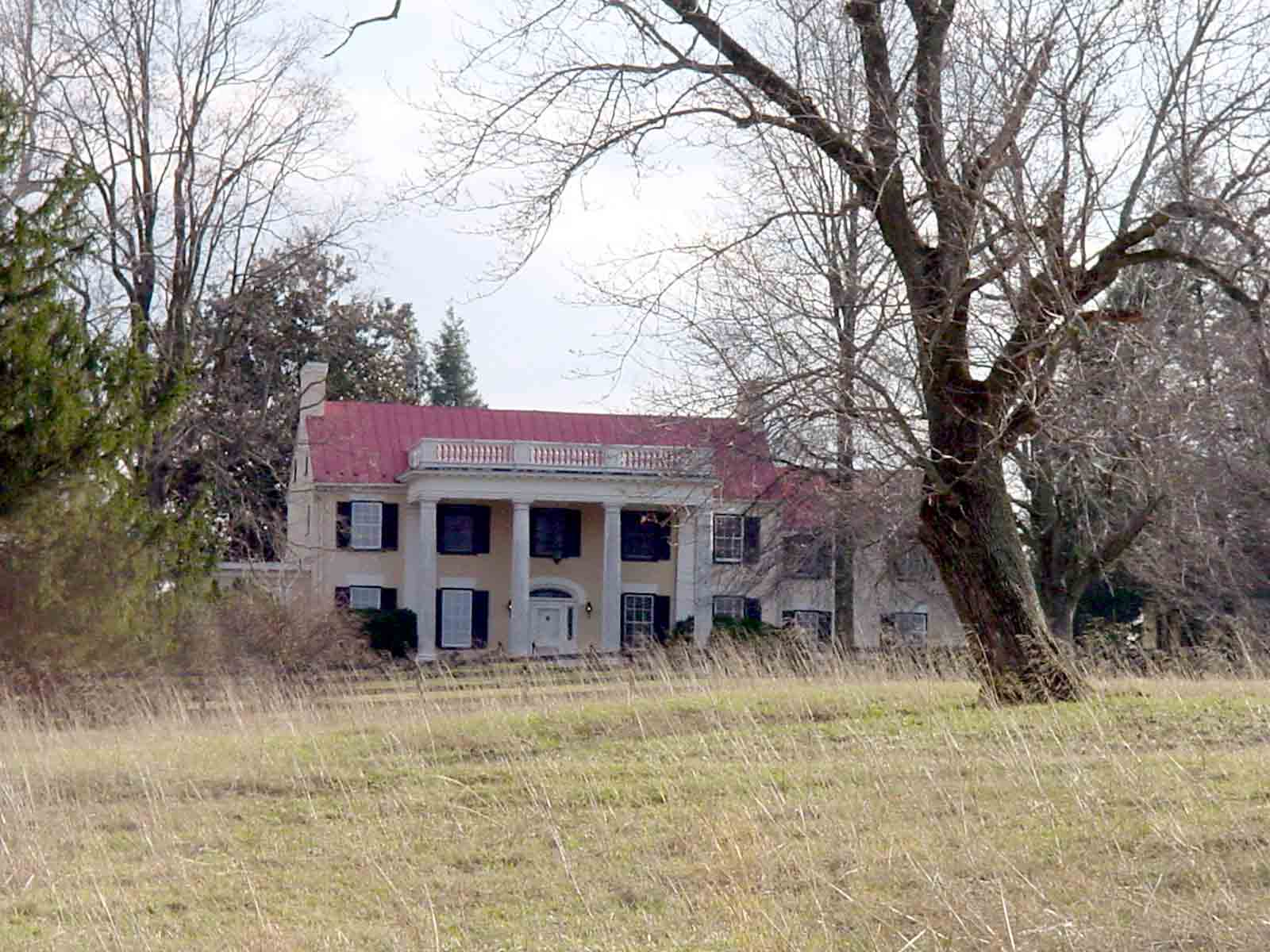
Blakeley

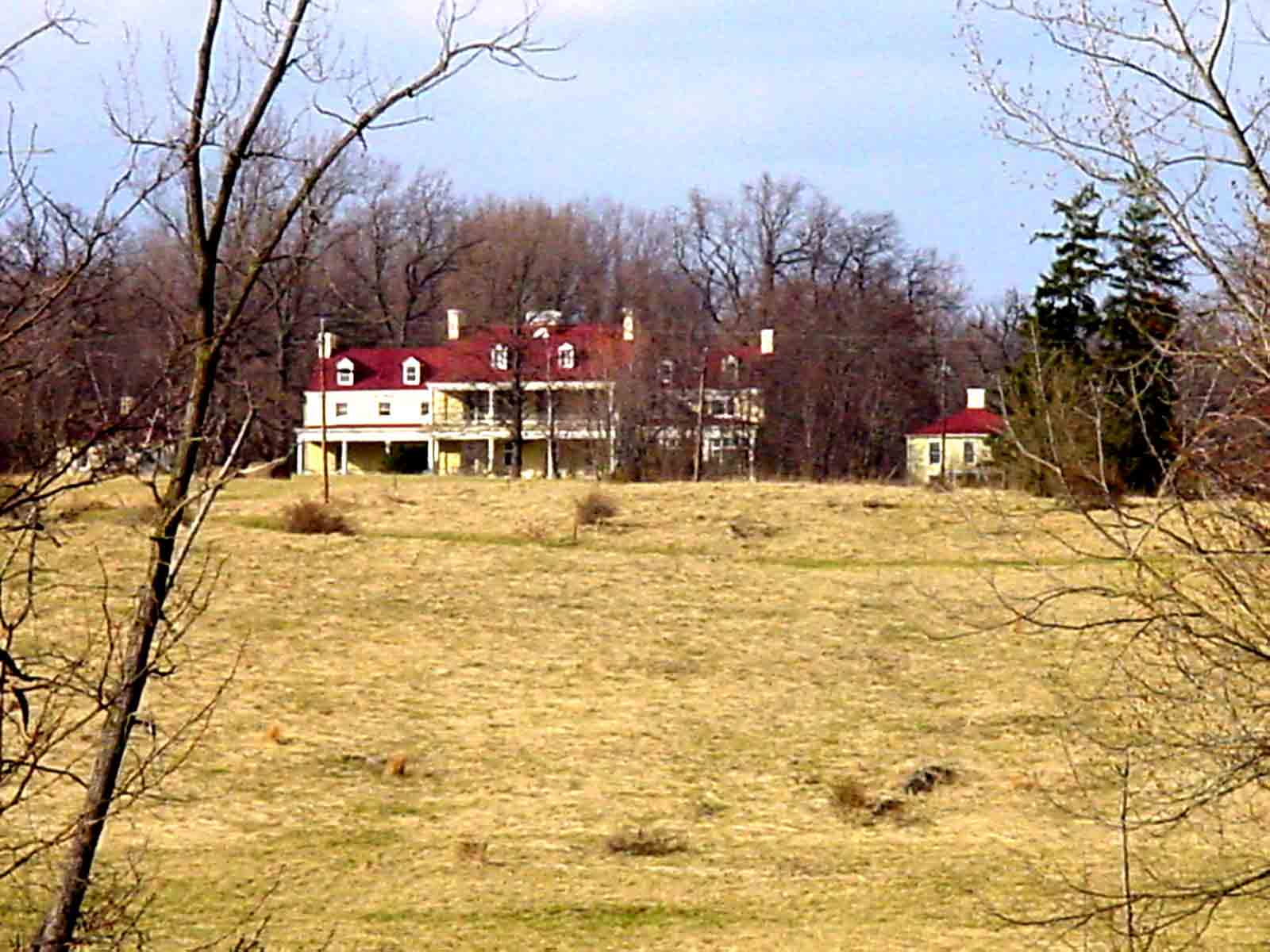
Claymont Court

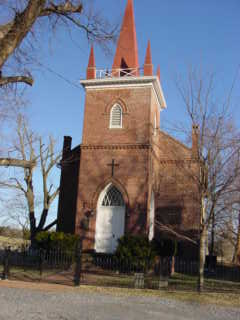
Grace Episcopal Church

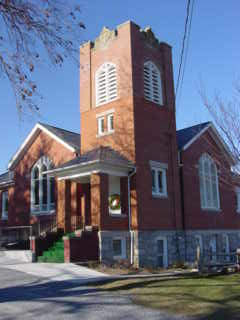
Kabletown Church

== See also ==
- National Register of Historic Places listings in Jefferson County, West Virginia
- Jefferson County Schools
- Jefferson County Sheriff's Department
