= Halltown, West Virginia =

- Unincorporated community
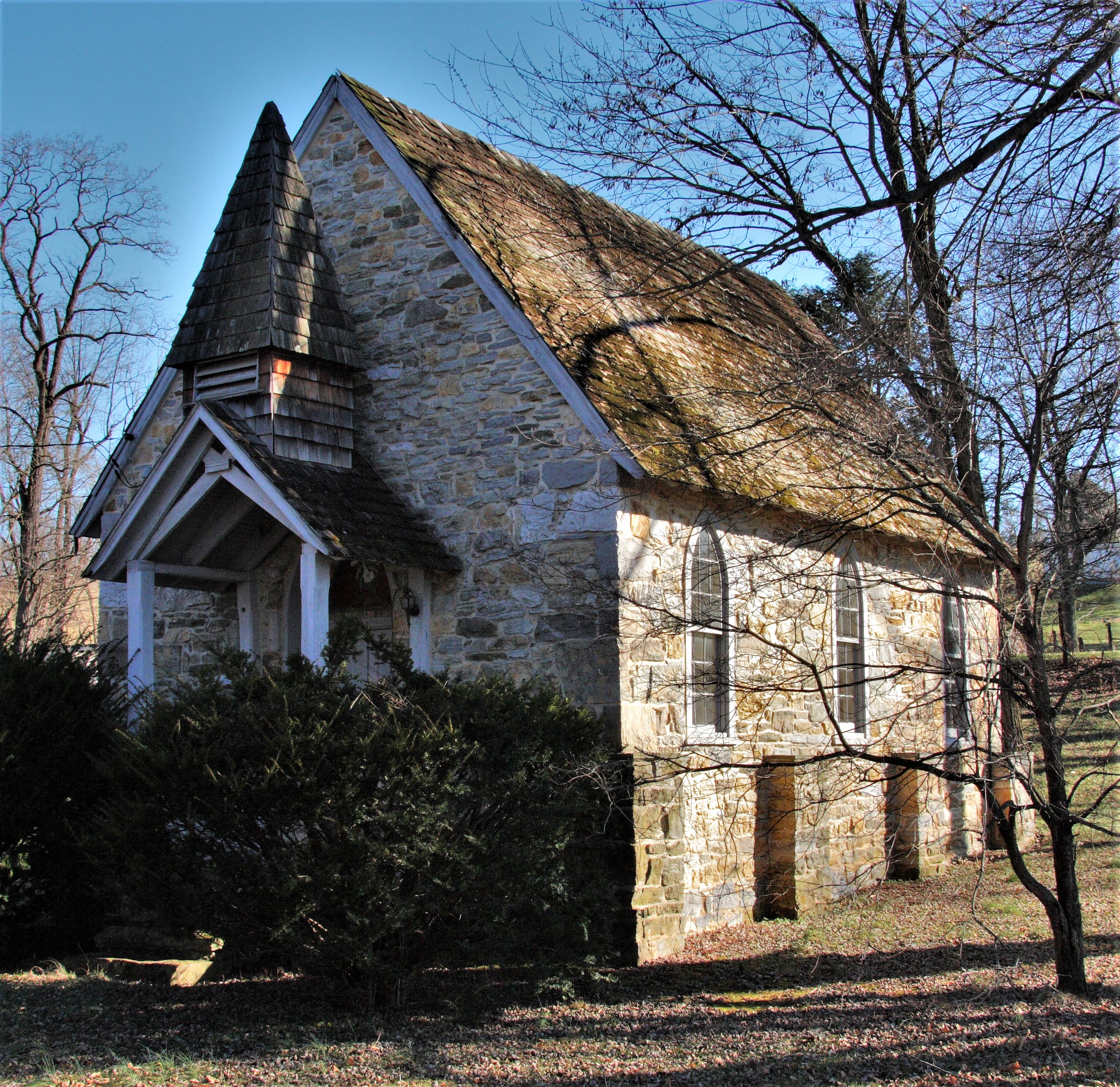
- Halltown Union Colored Sunday School on the National Register of Historic Places

- Location within West Virginia Location within the United States
- Coordinates: 39°18′50″N 77°47′52″W
- Country: United States
- State: West Virginia
- County: Jefferson
- Time zone: UTC-5 (Eastern (EST))
  - Summer (DST): UTC-4 (EDT)
- ZIP codes: 25423
- GNIS ID: 1554627

Halltown is an unincorporated community situated along Flowing Springs Run in Jefferson County, West Virginia, United States. Halltown is located off U.S. Route 340 on West Virginia Route 230 between Charles Town and Bolivar. The Halltown Paperboard Mill has operated in the community since 1869.

== History ==
The community was named after the Hall family, owners of a farm near the town site. In October 1896, the area surrounding Halltown was one of three areas in the U.S. – the others being Charles Town and Uvilla – to begin Rural Free Delivery (RFD) service.

== People ==
- Stephen Q. Luckett (1938–2025), American painter, illustrator, actor, and businessperson
