= Jefferson County Courthouse (West Virginia) =

Courthouse in Charles Town, West Virginia

- U.S. National Register of Historic Places
- U.S. National Historic Landmark
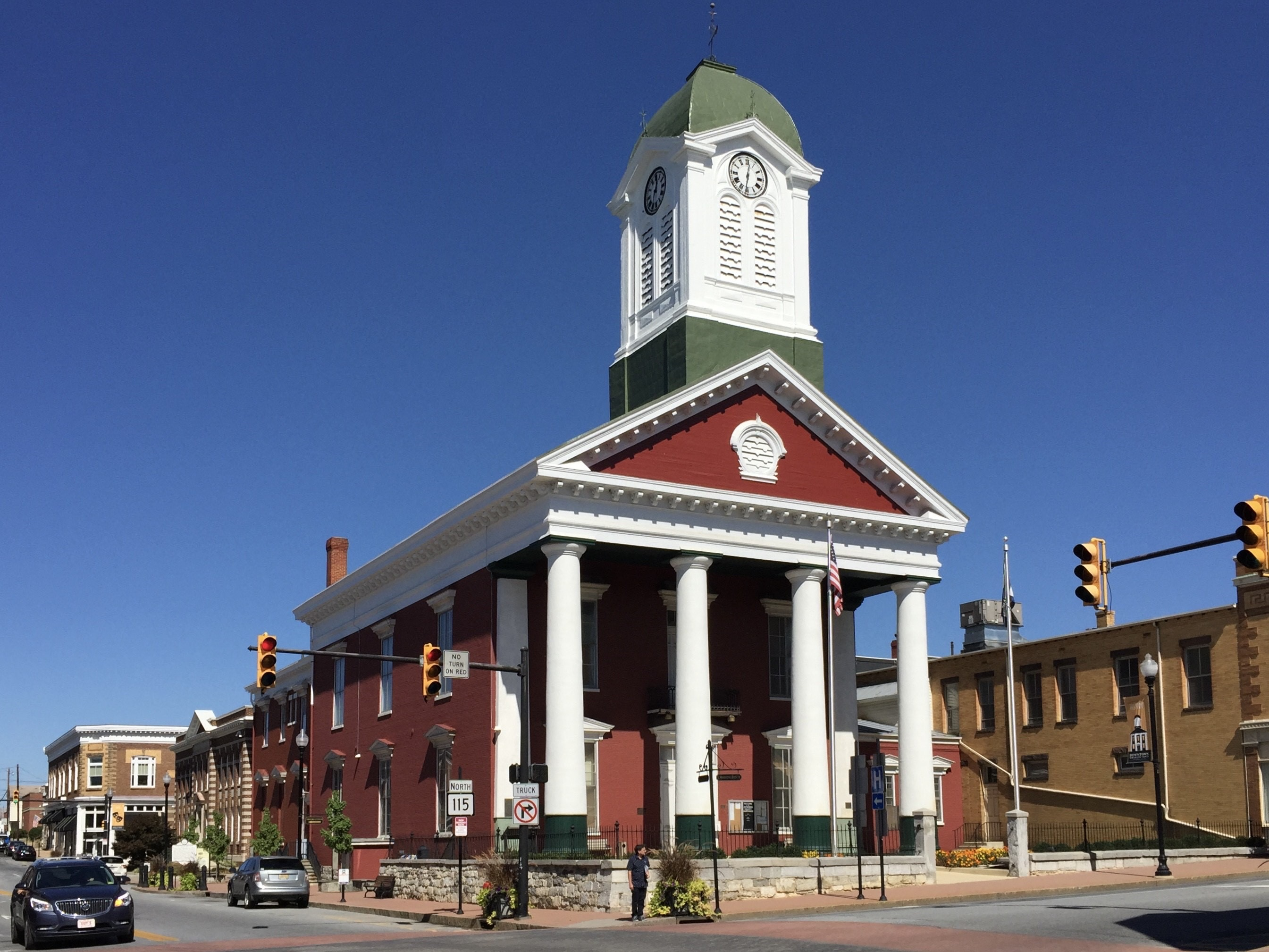
- Front of the courthouse

- Location within West Virginia Location within the United States
- Interactive map showing the location of Jefferson County Courthouse
- Location: 100 E. Washington St., Charles Town, West Virginia
- Coordinates: 39°17′20.78″N 77°51′35.32″W
- Built: c. 1836
- Architect: Phillips and Cockrill (1871); A.B. Mullett (1910)
- Architectural style: Georgian
- NRHP reference No.: 73001910 (NRHP listing), 100009833 (NHL designation)

Significant dates
- Added to NRHP: July 10, 1973
- Designated NHL: December 11, 2023

The Jefferson County Courthouse is a historic building in Charles Town, West Virginia, US. The building is historically notable as the site of two trials for treason: that of John Brown in 1859 (treason against Virginia), and those of unionizing coal miners from Mingo County, West Virginia (treason against West Virginia), a consequence of the Battle of Blair Mountain, whose trials were moved from the southern part of the state in 1922 as a result of a change of venue. It was designated a National Historic Landmark in 2023 for its role in the mining wars.

== Description ==
The courthouse is a red brick building in the Georgian style with a prominent Doric pedimented porch. It has an unusual clock tower with a square dome that resembles Second Empire structures. The courthouse is set on a high stone foundation, facing onto a small yard enclosed by a metal fence. The porch has four Doric columns, with small copies of the portico's pediment over the main floor windows and front door, and a projecting central iron balcony on the upper level. The first Mullett addition largely matches the main building, while the second addition features significant stone trim detailing.

== History ==
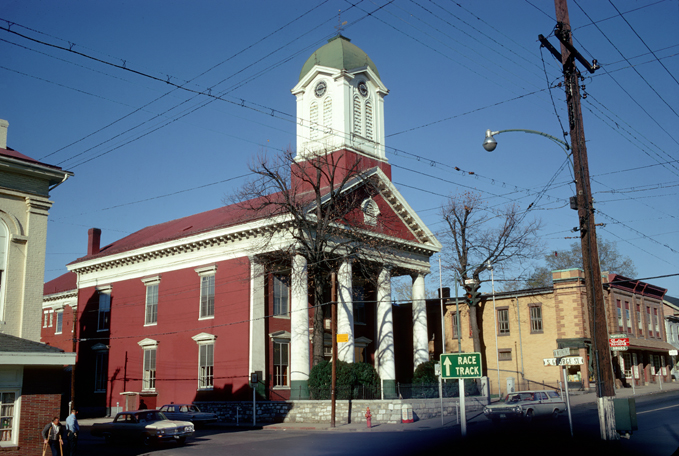
Jefferson County Courthouse in 1966

The first courthouse on the site was built in 1808 on a lot donated by Charles Washington, but was destroyed in a fire. Its replacement, the core of the present courthouse, was built in 1836–37 with its present Doric pedimented porch. During the American Civil War the courthouse was heavily damaged by cannon fire and was salvaged for metal. From 1865 to 1872 the courthouse was vacant, and court was held in Shepherdstown at McMurran Hall. In 1871–72 the building was reconstructed to a design by Phillips and Cockrill, keeping the façade, but little else. A disproportionately large cupola was added for the town clock on top of the porch at this time. In 1910 Alfred B. Mullett designed an extension to the rear, with a later Georgian Revival addition comprising a jail and sheriff's offices.

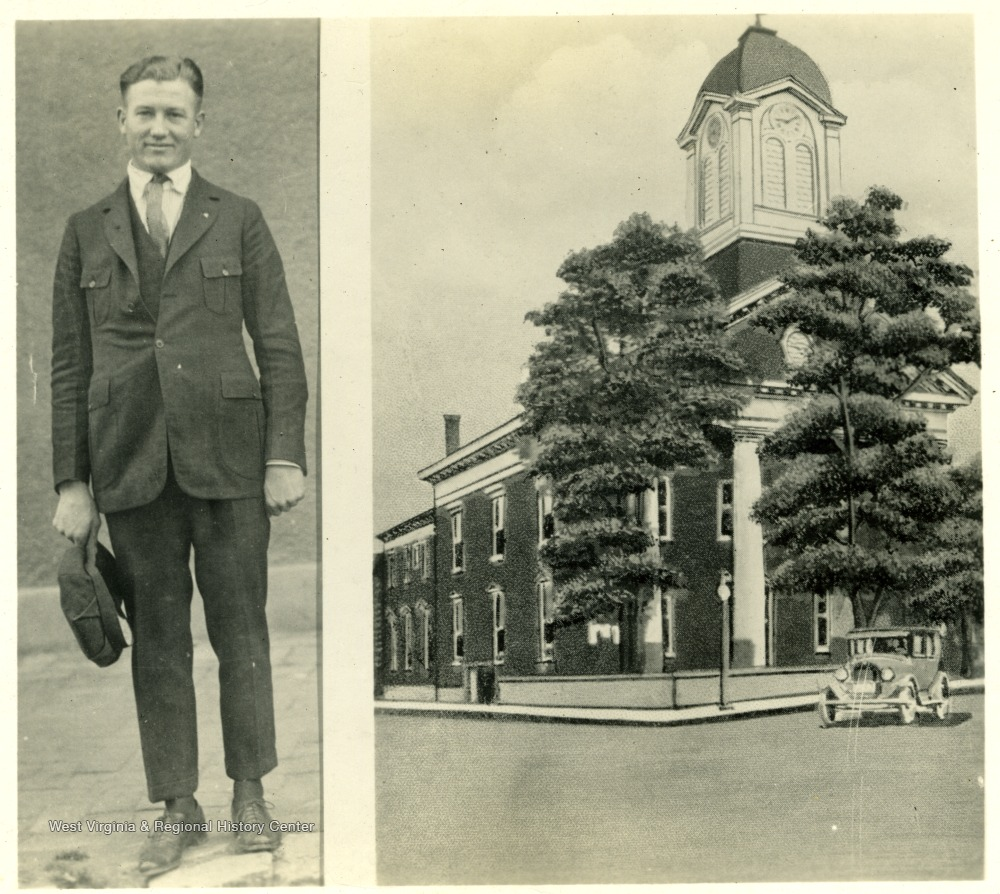
Bill Blizzard, one of the principal defendants in the Blair Mountain trials, and the courthouse c. 1922

Two famous trials have taken place in the courthouse. The first was Virginia v. John Brown, John Brown's 1859 trial for treason against Virginia, fomenting a slave insurrection, and murder. Brown's captured associates, facing the same charges, were tried at the same time. All were found guilty and executed. The second was the trial of coal miners from Mingo County who had fought in the Battle of Blair Mountain, whose trial had changed venue to Jefferson County. The trials eventually moved to Morgan County, and then Greenbrier County.

A former plaque at the entrance to the courthouse "in honor and memory of the Confederate soldiers of Jefferson County", placed in 1986 by the United Daughters of the Confederacy, was removed in 2018, as part of the wave of removal of Confederate monuments and memorials that followed Dylann Roof's massacre.
