= Uvilla, West Virginia =

- Unincorporated community
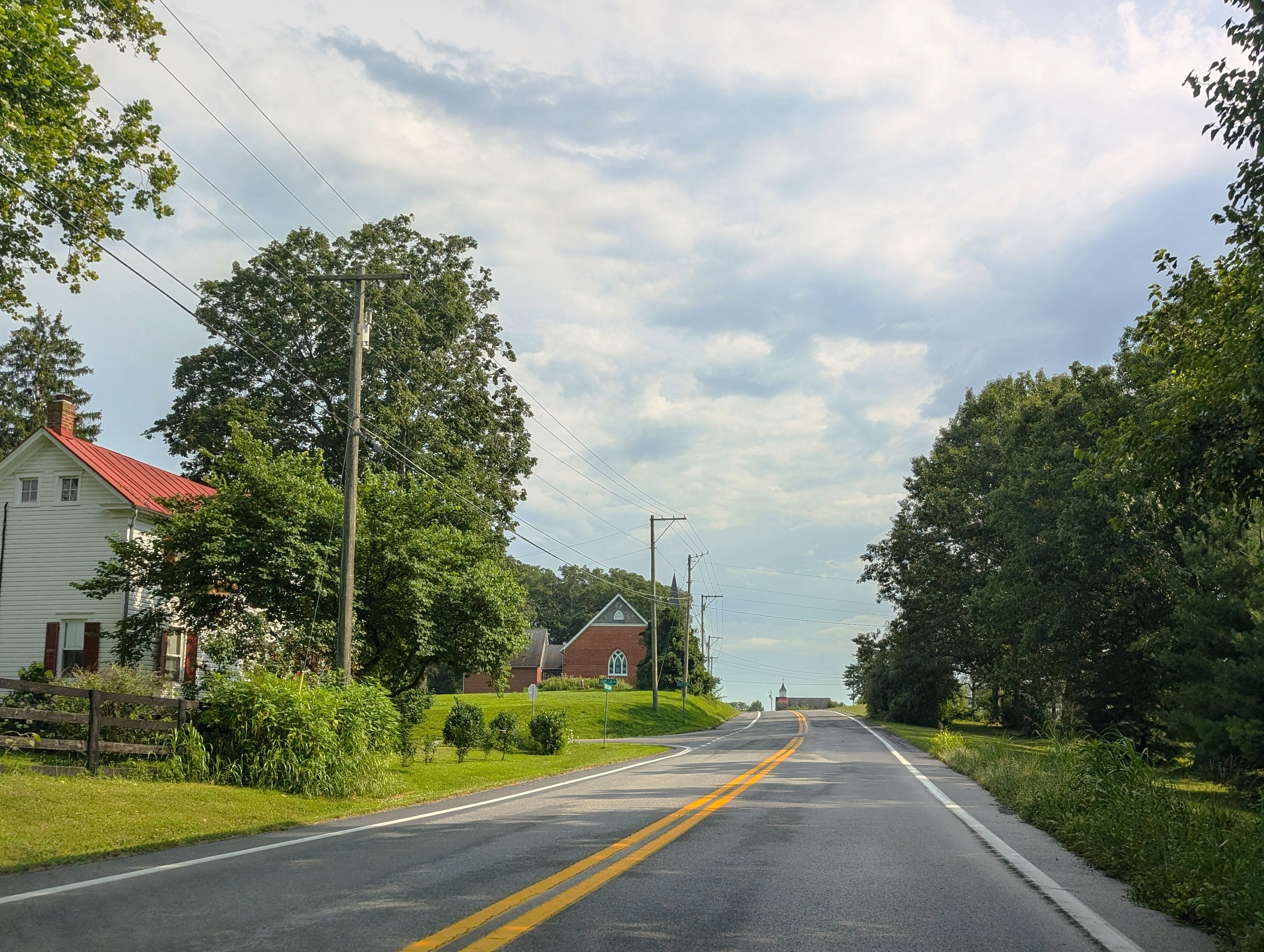
- WV 230 in Uvilla

- Location within West Virginia Location within the United States
- Coordinates: 39°22′8″N 77°48′1″W
- Country: United States
- State: West Virginia
- County: Jefferson
- Time zone: UTC-5 (Eastern (EST))
  - Summer (DST): UTC-4 (EDT)
- GNIS ID: 1555865

Uvilla is an unincorporated community on West Virginia Route 230 in Jefferson County, West Virginia, United States.
