= Meadow Branch =

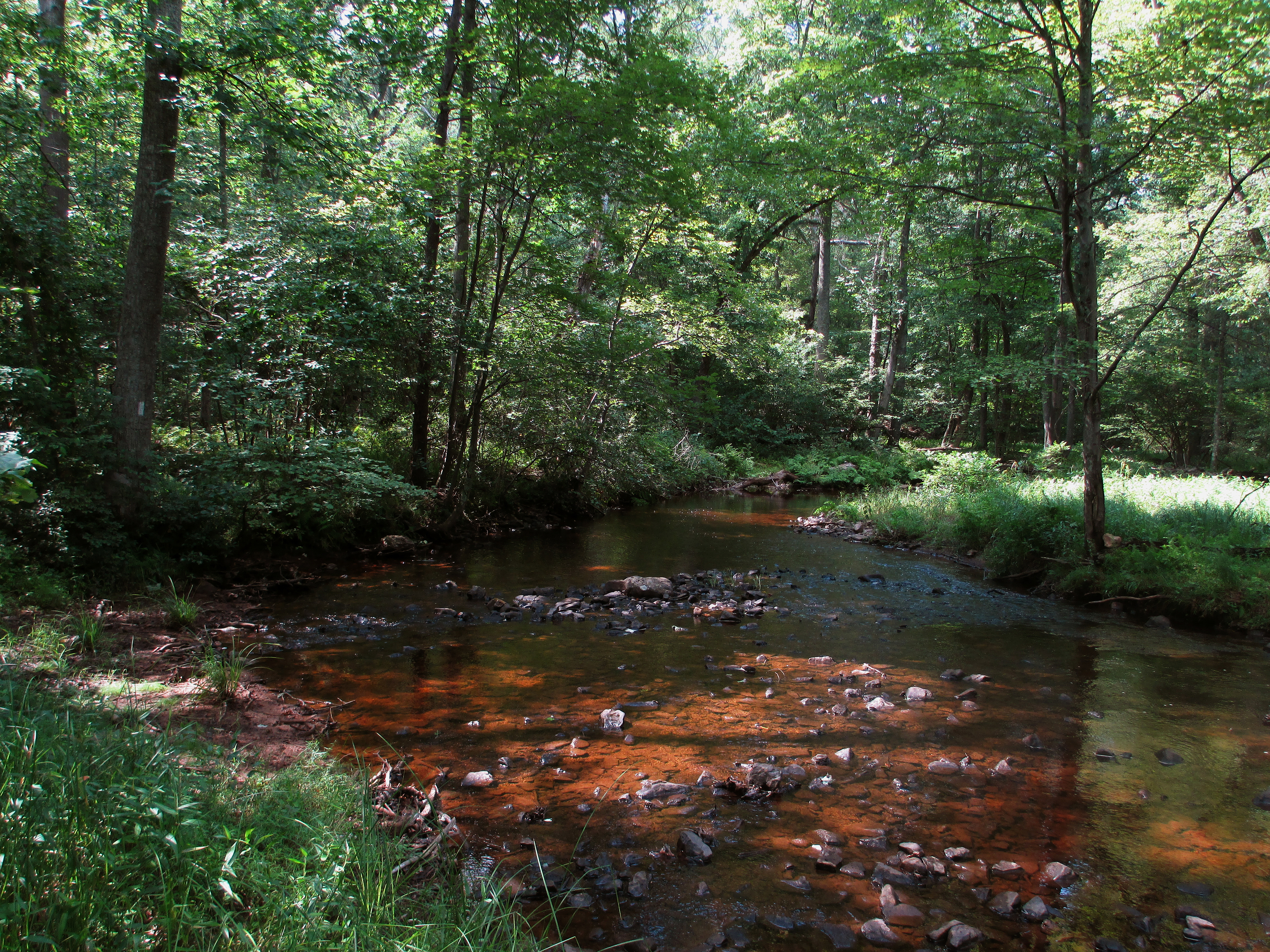
- Meadow Branch within Sleepy Creek Wildlife Management Area, downstream of the Sleepy Creek Lake impoundment, August 2016.

- Location of the mouth of Meadow Branch in West Virginia Meadow Branch (the United States)

Location
- Country: United States
- State: West Virginia
- Counties: Berkeley, Morgan

Physical characteristics
- Source
  - location: West of Shanghai, Berkeley County
  - coordinates: 39°26′55″N 78°11′46″W
- Mouth: Sleepy Creek
  - location: Mount Trimble, Morgan County
  - coordinates: 39°38′16″N 78°06′57″W
- Length: 16.7 mi (26.9 km)

Basin features
- Tributaries
  - right: Roaring Run

Meadow Branch is a 16.7-mile-long (26.9 km) tributary stream of Sleepy Creek in West Virginia's Eastern Panhandle region. It passes through the Sleepy Creek Wildlife Management Area, where it is dammed to form the 205-acre (0.83 km^{2}) Sleepy Creek Lake.

== Course ==
Meadow Branch's source lies between Sleepy Creek Mountain (1,905 feet [581 m]) and Third Hill Mountain (2,172 feet [662 m]) near Locks-of-the-Mountain in Berkeley County. Meadow Branch continues between the two mountains northward through the Sleepy Creek Wildlife Management Area where it joins Roaring Run. Meadow Branch is dammed to form Sleepy Creek Lake, a 205-acre (0.83 km^{2}) impoundment. The stream flows into Morgan County where it meanders through the steep valley created at the northern ends of both Sleepy Creek and Third Hill Mountains. From the valley, Meadow Branch parallels West Virginia Route 9 and empties into Sleepy Creek in Spruce Pine Hollow.

== See also ==
- List of rivers of West Virginia
