= Cherry Run =

Stream in West Virginia, United States

Coordinates: 39°37′11″N 78°01′20″W

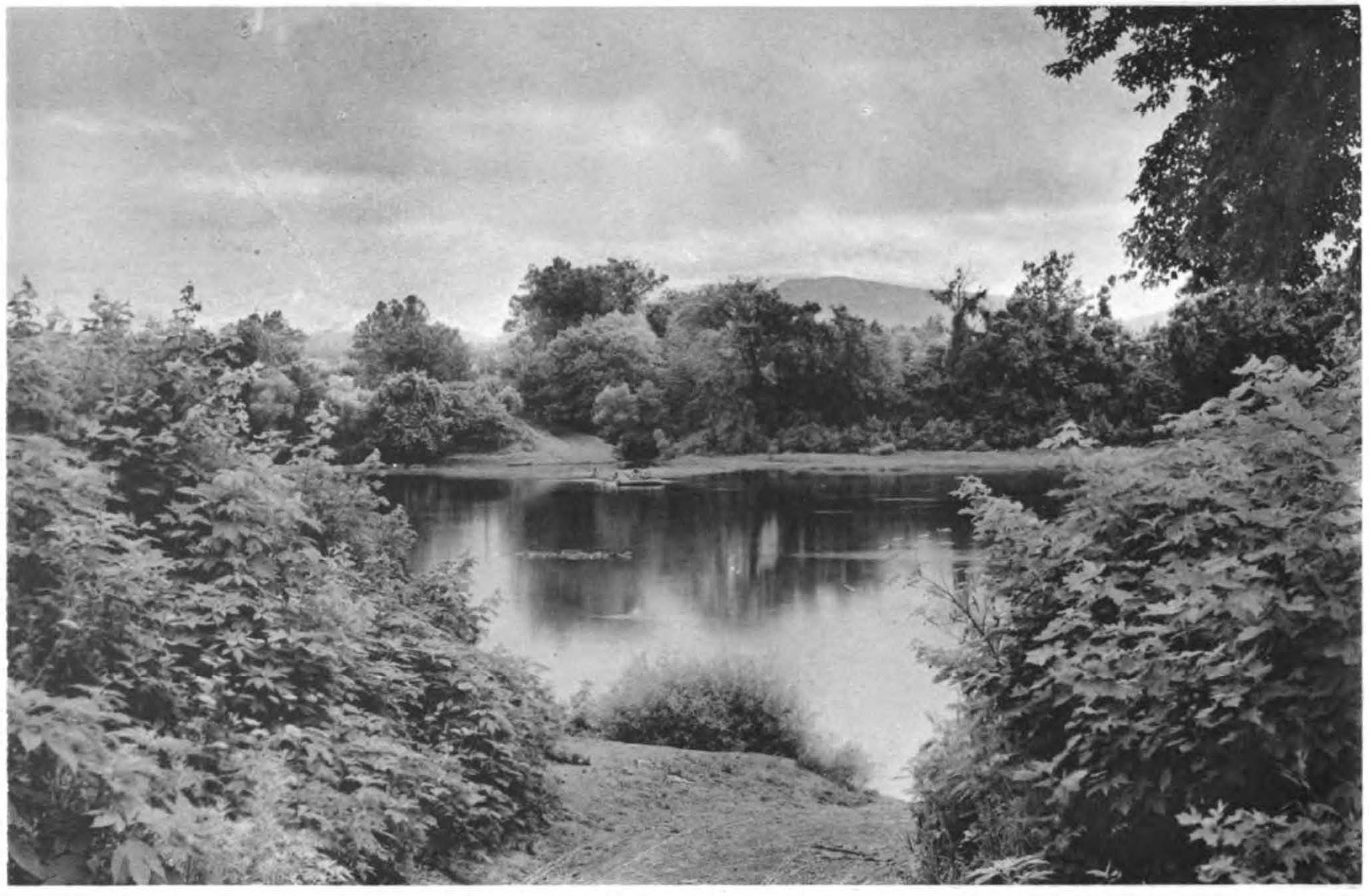
The Potomac River near Cherry Run, at the Junction of the Western Maryland and Baltimore & Ohio Railroads (c. 1898)

Cherry Run is a 7.2-mile-long (11.6 km) meandering stream that forms the northern section of the boundary between Morgan and Berkeley counties in West Virginia's Eastern Panhandle. While it is mostly non-navigable, Cherry Run provides many pools of varying depths for fishing and swimming. As a tributary of the Potomac River, Cherry Run is part of the Potomac and Chesapeake Bay watersheds.

== Headwaters and course ==
Cherry Run is formed by mountain springs on the northern flanks of Third Hill Mountain (2,172 feet) south of Paines Knob (1,352 feet). From its source, it acts as a natural boundary between Morgan and Berkeley Counties. Cherry Run flows southeast through the Sleepy Creek Wildlife Management Area via a gap in Short Mountain (1,375 feet). Its direction shifts northeastward following along the eastern flanks of Short Mountain. Through Sleepy Hollow, Cherry Run is dammed to create Sleepy Hollow Lake. Further north, it is joined by three unnamed spring-fed streams. Cherry Run shifts eastward away from Short Mountain, running under West Virginia Route 9 and by the community of Holton. From Holton, the stream curves northeast running parallel to the east of Sleepy Creek Road (CR 5). Cherry Run meanders eastward to the south of its namesake, the town of Cherry Run. After flowing under the bridges of Camp Hill Road and the Baltimore and Ohio Railroad, Cherry Run empties into the Potomac River directly across from the community of Big Pool, Maryland.

== Stream access ==
The West Virginia Division of Natural Resources owns a public access site with several concrete ramps for small boats at the mouth of Cherry Run for fishing.

== See also ==
- List of West Virginia rivers
