= Johnsons Mill, West Virginia =

Johnsons Mill
- Unincorporated community
- Location within the state of West Virginia Johnsons Mill (the United States)
- Coordinates: 39°34′9″N 78°11′58″W
- Country: United States
- State: West Virginia
- County: Morgan
- Time zone: UTC-5 (Eastern (EST))
  - Summer (DST): UTC-4 (EDT)
- GNIS feature ID: 1554822

Johnsons Mill is an unincorporated community in eastern Morgan County in the U.S. state of West Virginia on Johnson's Mill Road (West Virginia Secondary Route 26). It is centrally located between three other small rural hamlets along Sleepy Creek and is named for the "Johnson's Mill" that once operated here.

Smith Crossroads on Winchester Grade Road (West Virginia Secondary Route 13) is to its west by way of Autumn Acres Road (West Virginia Secondary Route 26), New Hope is to its north by way of Spohr's Road (West Virginia Secondary Route 8), and Duckwall is located to its east on Johnson's Mill Road along the western flanks of Sleepy Creek Mountain.
