= Spring house =

Small building constructed over a spring

A spring house, or springhouse, is a small building, usually of a single room, constructed over a spring. While the original purpose of a springhouse was to keep the spring water clean by excluding fallen leaves, animals, etc., the enclosing structure was also used for refrigeration before the advent of ice delivery and, later, electric refrigeration. The water of the spring maintains a constant cool temperature inside the spring house throughout the year. Food that would otherwise spoil, such as meat, fruit, or dairy products, could be kept there, safe from animal depredations as well. Springhouses thus often also served as pumphouses, milkhouses and root cellars.

The Tomahawk Spring spring house at Tomahawk, West Virginia, was listed on the National Register of Historic Places in 1994.

== Gallery ==
A small spring house near Collegeville, Pennsylvania.

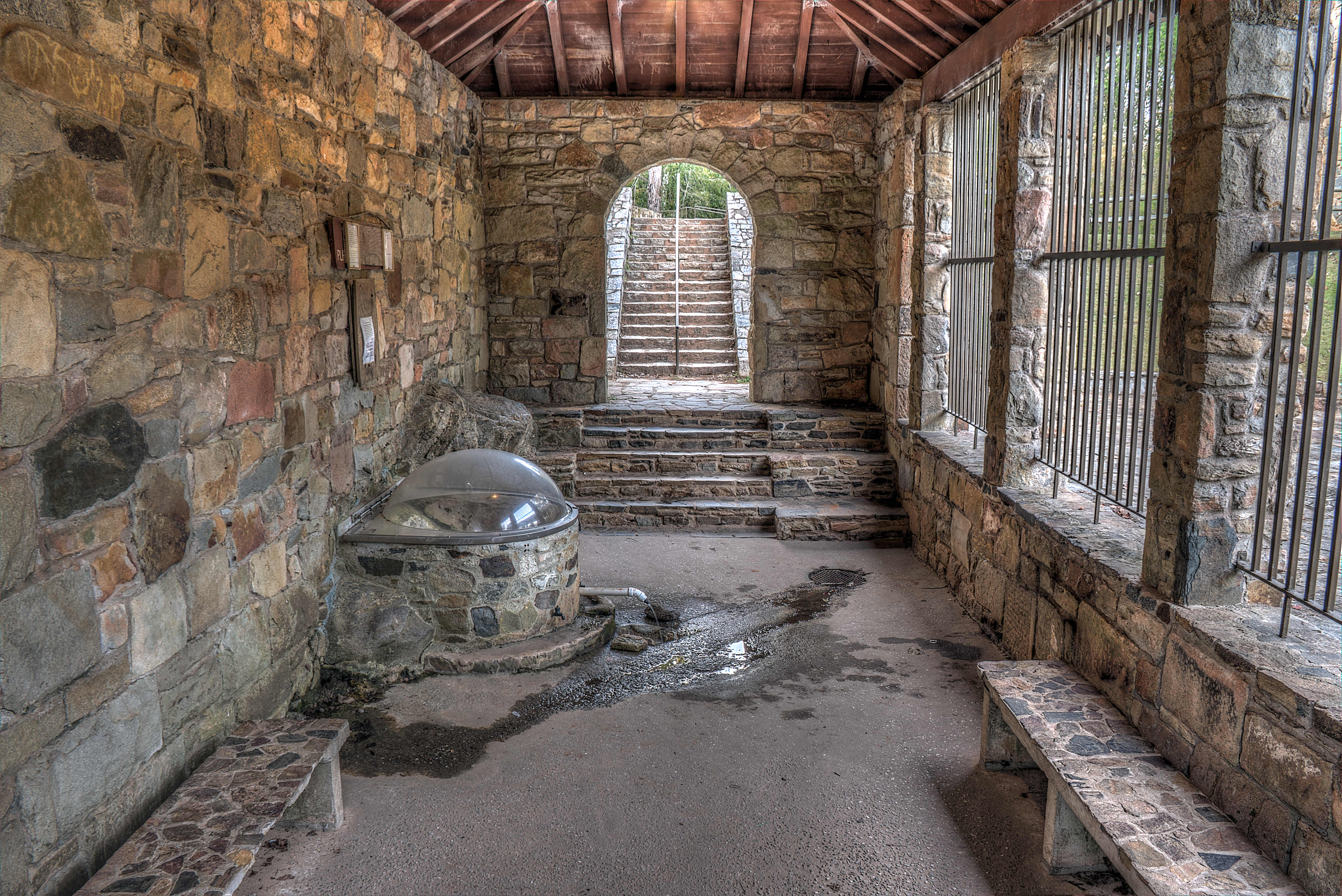
Stone spring house at Indian Springs State Park.

The Brewery Spring springhouse in Silver Plume, Colorado.

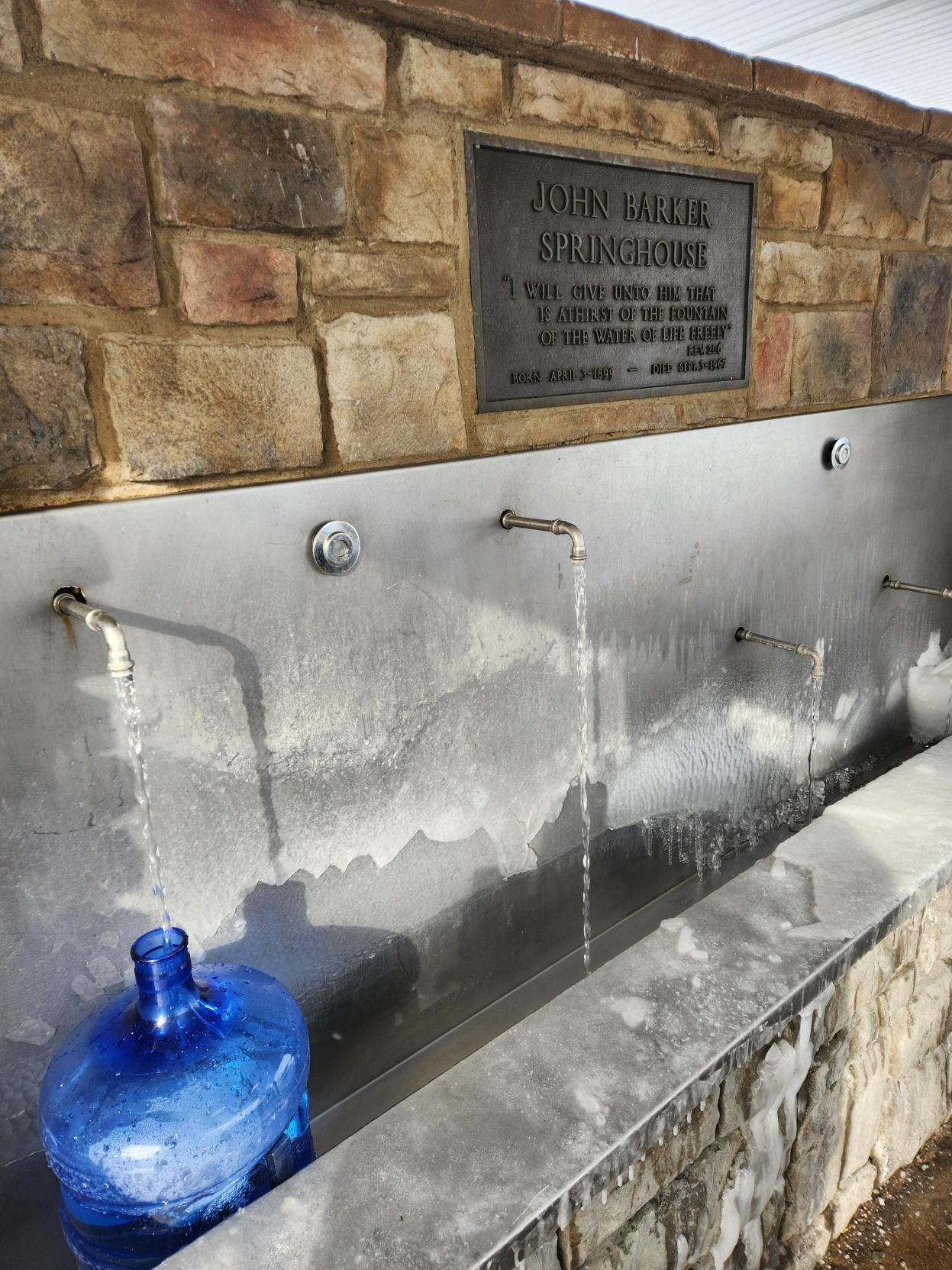
Photo of the interior of the John Barker Spring House in Canton, Ohio.

== See also ==
- Ice house (building)
- Smokehouse
- Windcatcher
