= Sleepy Creek =

- Location of the mouth of Sleepy Creek in West Virginia Sleepy Creek (the United States)

Location
- Country: United States
- State: Virginia, West Virginia
- Counties: Frederick, Morgan

Physical characteristics
- Source
  - location: Near Whitacre, Frederick County, Virginia
  - coordinates: 39°21′17″N 78°20′39″W
- Mouth: Potomac River
  - location: Sleepy Creek, Morgan County, West Virginia
  - coordinates: 39°40′14″N 78°05′04″W
- Length: 44 mi (71 km)

Sleepy Creek is a 44.0-mile-long (70.8 km) tributary of the Potomac River in the United States, belonging to the Chesapeake Bay's watershed. The stream rises in Frederick County, Virginia, and flows through Morgan County, West Virginia before joining the Potomac near the community of Sleepy Creek.

While Sleepy Creek Lake is a part of the Sleepy Creek watershed, it is an impoundment of its tributary, Meadow Branch, in Berkeley County, West Virginia and not of Sleepy Creek itself.

== Course ==
Sleepy Creek's source lies north of State Route 127 in Frederick County, Virginia, near the Hampshire County, West Virginia border at Good. From Frederick County, Sleepy Creek flows north through Morgan County, West Virginia, where it drains into the Potomac at the community of Sleepy Creek on the old Baltimore and Ohio Railroad's mainline.

=== Tributaries ===
Tributary streams listed from south (source) to north (mouth).

- Bear Garden Run
- Hands Run
- Breakneck Run
- Indian Run
  - South Fork Indian Run
  - Middle Fork Indian Run
  - North Fork Indian Run
- Rock Gap Run
- Middle Fork Sleepy Creek
  - Iden Run
- South Fork Sleepy Creek
  - Merchant Run
- Mountain Run
- Yellow Spring Run
- Meadow Branch

== Bridges ==
Bridge	Route	Location
CR 38/10 Bridge	Fish Hatchery Road (CR 38/10)	Ridge
Oakland Road Bridge	Oakland Road (CR 28)	Oakland
CR 13 Bridge	Winchester Grade Road (CR 13)	Smith Crossroads
Smith Crossroads Bridge	Spriggs Road (CR 13/1)	Smith Crossroads
Johnson's Mill Bridge	Johnson's Mill Road (CR 26)	Johnsons Mill
CR 8 Bridge	Highland Ridge Road (CR 8)	Johnsons Mill
WV 9 Sleepy Creek Bridge	Martinsburg Road (WV 9)	Spohrs Crossroads
Restricted Height Bridge	Burnt Mill Road (CR 1/3)	Spohrs Crossroads
River Road Bridge	River Road (CR 1)	Sleepy Creek
Sleepy Creek Railroad Bridge	Baltimore and Ohio Railroad	Sleepy Creek

== Cities and towns along Sleepy Creek ==
- Good
- Johnsons Mill
- New Hope
- Omps
- Ridge
- Sleepy Creek
- Smith Crossroads
- Spohrs Crossroads
- Stotlers Crossroads

== See also ==
- List of West Virginia rivers
- List of Virginia rivers
- Sleepy Creek Wildlife Management Area
