= Sleepy Creek Mountain =

Mountain in the U.S. state of West Virginia

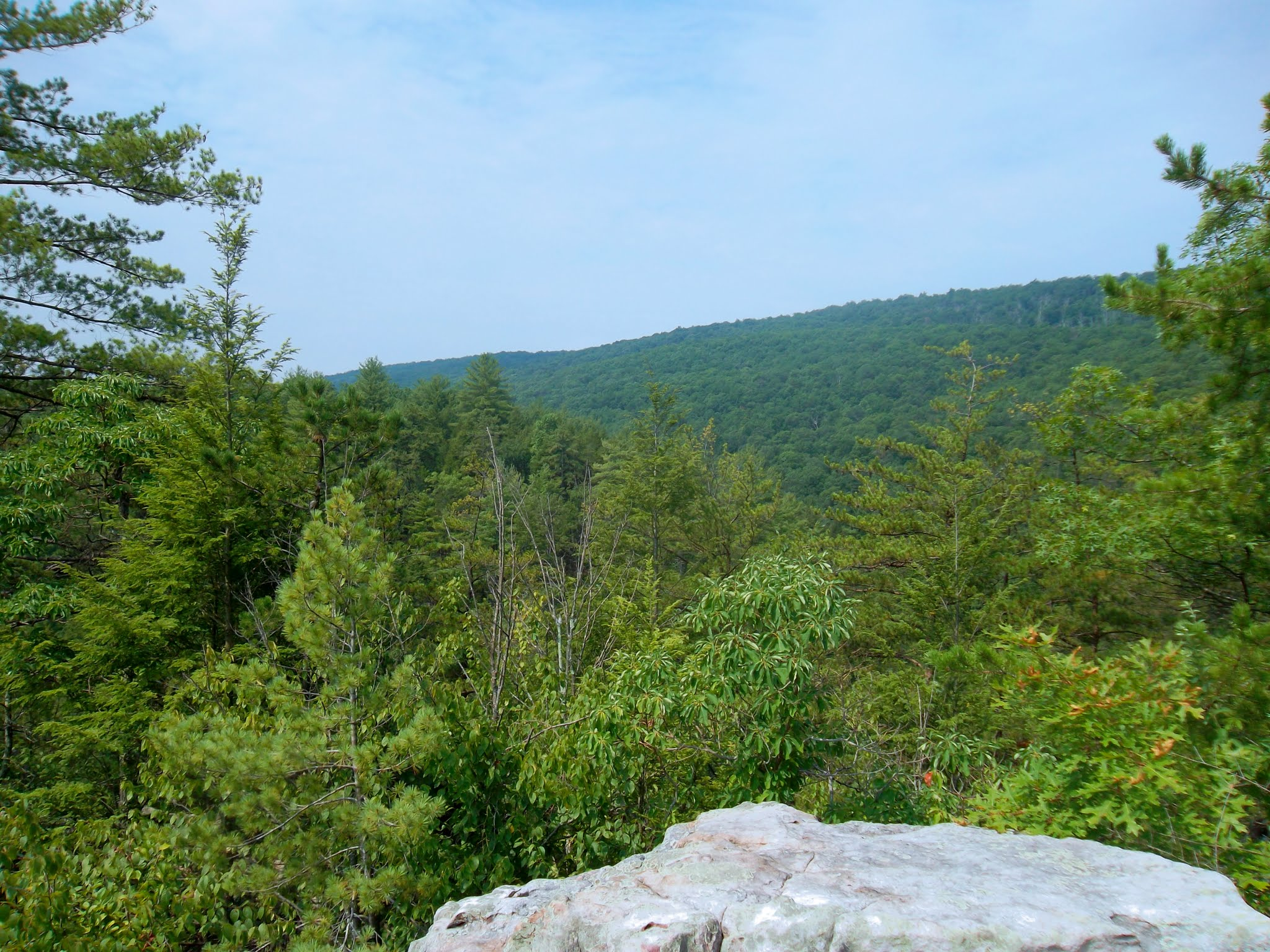
- Sleepy Creek Mountain as seen from Devil's Nose in Meadow Branch gorge

Highest point
- Elevation: 1,903 ft (580 m)
- Coordinates: 39°27′28″N 78°11′45″W

Geography
- Location within West Virginia
- Location: Berkeley / Morgan counties, West Virginia, U.S.
- Parent range: Ridge-and-Valley Appalachians and Allegheny Mountains
- Topo map: USGS Glengary

Sleepy Creek Mountain is a mountain ridge in the Ridge-and-Valley Appalachians on the border between Morgan and Berkeley counties in the Eastern Panhandle of West Virginia. The long-distance Tuscarora Trail traverses the southern ridge and northern bench of the mountain.

Together with Third Hill Mountain to the east, the two mountains form a blind valley that contains Sleepy Creek Lake and the Sleepy Creek Wildlife Management Area. Sleepy Creek and Third Hill Mountains are distinctive for their height in the relatively level terrain of the far Eastern Panhandle of West Virginia.

== Geography ==
The southern end of Sleepy Creek Mountain, Shockeys Knob (1,873 feet [571 m]), lies in northern Frederick County, Virginia and is shared by Berkeley and Morgan counties in West Virginia. The mountain continues along southwest–northeast orientation between the two counties and peaks again at High Rock (1,811 feet [552 m]). Sleepy Creek Mountain is conjoined with Third Hill Mountain at "Locks-of-the-Mountain". From "Locks-of-the-Mountain", the Meadow Branch of Sleepy Creek is formed flowing northward between the two mountain ridges. North of this point, Sleepy Creek Mountain reaches its highest summit at 1,905 feet (581 m). East of Johnsons Mill, Whites Gap (1,492 feet [455 m]) is formed in mountain. With Sleepy Creek on its western flank, and Meadow Branch to its eastern flank, Sleepy Creek Mountain is then located entirely in Morgan County. Sleepy Creek Mountain's northern end lies at the confluence of Sleepy Creek and its Meadow Branch. Just south of its northern terminus, on the eastern flank is the Devils Nose Rock formation (not to be confused with the nearby Devil's Nose Mountain), which juts out into the Meadow Branch gorge forcing a sharp bend in the creek.

== Flora and fauna ==
Sleepy Creek Mountain is entirely forested with its woodlands consisting primarily of oaks, hickories, and Virginia pine. Deer, wild turkey, grouse, squirrel, and raccoon are all prevalent species on the mountain ridge.
