= Duckwall, West Virginia =

Unincorporated community in West Virginia, United States

Duckwall
- Unincorporated community
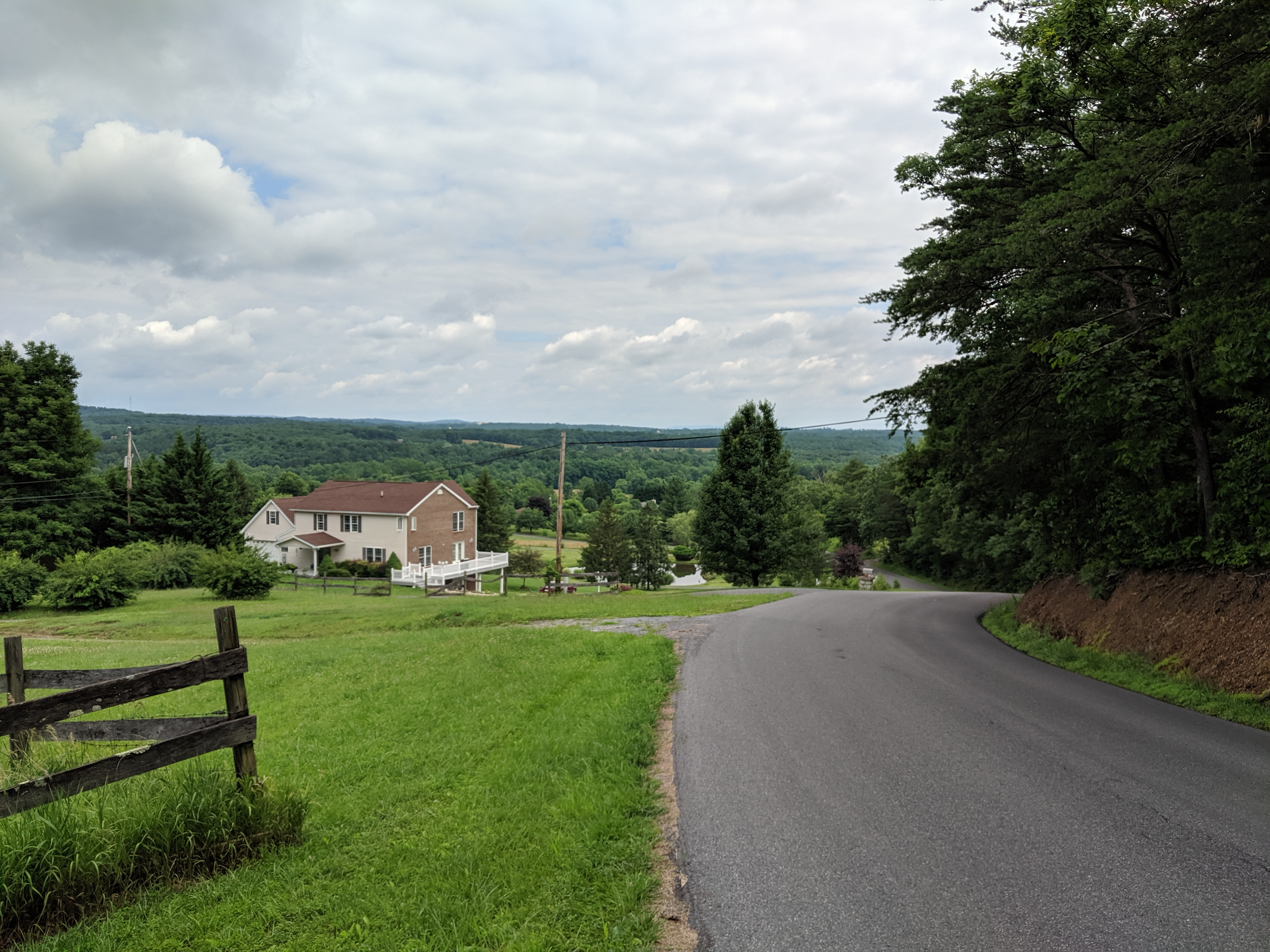
- Highland Ridge Road (County Route 8) through Duckwall, looking north

- Location within the state of West Virginia Duckwall (the United States)
- Coordinates: 39°34′6″N 78°11′6″W
- Country: United States
- State: West Virginia
- County: Morgan
- Time zone: UTC-5 (Eastern (EST))
  - Summer (DST): UTC-4 (EDT)
- GNIS feature ID: 1557927

Duckwall is an unincorporated community in Morgan County in the U.S. state of West Virginia's Eastern Panhandle. It is located along Sleepy Creek east of Johnsons Mill.
