= Mount Trimble, West Virginia =

Mount Trimble
- Unincorporated community
- Location within the state of West Virginia Mount Trimble (the United States)
- Coordinates: 39°38′24″N 78°6′35″W
- Country: United States
- State: West Virginia
- County: Morgan
- Time zone: UTC-5 (Eastern (EST))
  - Summer (DST): UTC-4 (EDT)
- GNIS feature ID: 1557957

Mount Trimble is an unincorporated community in Morgan County in the U.S. state of West Virginia's Eastern Panhandle. Mount Trimble is situated around the crossroads at Michael's Chapel near the confluence of Sleepy Creek and Meadow Branch.

== Historic sites ==
- Michael's Chapel
