= Bear Garden Mountain =

Mountain ridge in West Virginia, United States

- Location within West Virginia

Highest point
- Elevation: 1,566 ft (477 m)
- Listing: Mountains of Virginia; Mountains of West Virginia
- Coordinates: 39°19′53″N 78°23′42″W

Geography
- Location: Frederick County, Virginia / Hampshire County, West Virginia, U.S.
- Parent range: Ridge-and-Valley Appalachians
- Topo map: USGS Capon Bridge

Climbing
- Easiest route: Hike, Drive

Bear Garden Mountain is a forested mountain ridge of the Ridge-and-Valley Appalachians in Hampshire County, West Virginia and Frederick County, Virginia.

== Geography ==
Bear Garden Mountain runs southwest–northeast from its northern terminus at Bear Garden run in northern Frederick County to its southern terminus at Mill Branch creek in Hampshire County, near Capon Bridge. A 2.5-mile (4.0 km) stretch of the ridge, starting 3 miles (4.8 km) south of its northern terminus, serves as the Virginia-West Virginia border.

The mountain is bisected by the Northwestern Turnpike (U.S. Route 50) to the east of Capon Bridge and by the Bloomery Pike (West Virginia Route 127/State Route 127) at Good.
