= Allensville, West Virginia =

Unincorporated community in West Virginia, United States

Allensville
- Unincorporated community
- Location within the state of West Virginia Allensville (the United States)
- Coordinates: 39°34′59″N 77°59′35″W
- Country: United States
- State: West Virginia
- County: Berkeley
- Elevation: 423 ft (129 m)
- Time zone: UTC-5 (Eastern (EST))
  - Summer (DST): UTC-4 (EDT)
- GNIS feature ID: 1553711

Allensville is an unincorporated community in Berkeley County in the U.S. state of West Virginia's Eastern Panhandle. It is located on Allensville Road (West Virginia Secondary Route 3/2) to the east of Back Creek shortly before its confluence with the Potomac River. The claypits in North Mountain along the old Baltimore and Ohio Railroad mainline lie to the southeast of Allensville.
