= Baldwin-Grantham House =

Historic house in West Virginia, United States

- Baldwin--Grantham House
- U.S. National Register of Historic Places
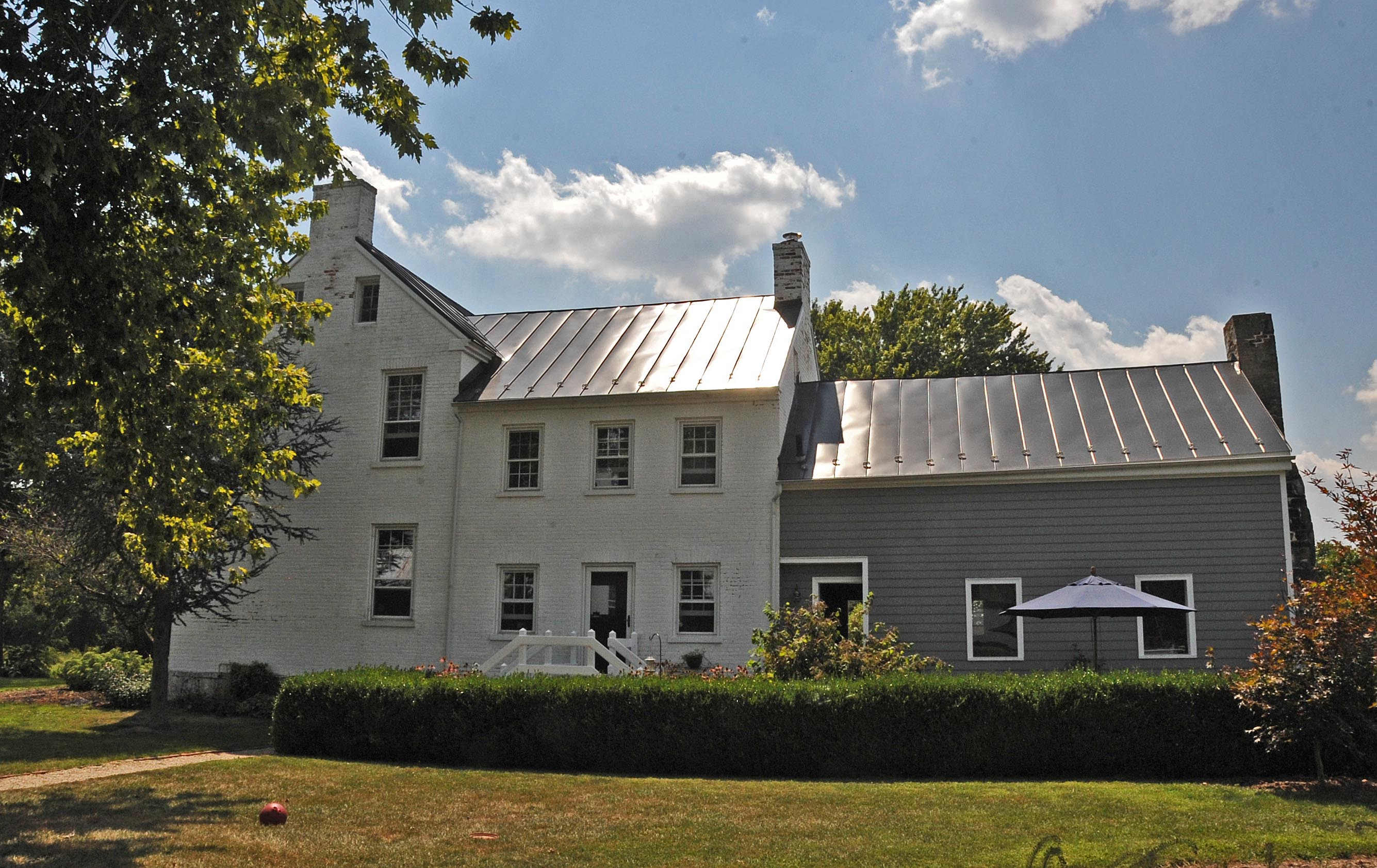
- AKA LOCUST GROVE AND SHANGHAI HOUSE; THE EARLIEST PORTION DATES TO 1749 AND WAS BUILT BY FRANCES BALDWIN. THE TWO STORY PORTION WAS BUILT IN 1849 BY MOSES GRANTHAM

- Location within West Virginia Location within the United States
- Nearest city: Shanghai, West Virginia
- Coordinates: 39°26′14″N 78°7′8″W
- Built: 1749
- Architect: Dahl
- Architectural style: Federal, Greek Revival
- NRHP reference No.: 94001296
- Added to NRHP: November 21, 1994

The Baldwin-Grantham House, also known as Locust Grove and Shanghai House, was built in 1749 in Shanghai, West Virginia, in the Back Creek district of Berkeley County. The earliest portion of the house is a log cabin built in 1749 by Frances Baldwin. Frances and his wife Sarah lived there until 1790, when they sold the property to Joseph Grantham and Jacob Fry. William Grantham inherited the land from his father and circa 1820 built a brick kitchen addition onto the cabin, which now forms the middle part of the house.

William died in 1838 and his son Moses took over the farm, which he called Locust Grove. In 1849 Moses built the two-story front portion of the house. Moses Grantham went on to acquire extensive property holdings around Berkeley County, including Grantham Hall on the square in downtown Martinsburg. He served two terms in the Virginia Senate and one term in the West Virginia Senate.

The log portion of the house is 1½ stories with a large stone chimney and a single room. The logs are exposed, although they once were sided. The interior is faced with beaded tongue and groove paneling, dating to circa 1920. The brick addition is connected by a small dog-trot breezeway, about 4 feet (1.2 m) wide. The addition is two stories high, with a two-story porch on the south side. The interior is plastered. The 1849 portion of the house is the present front, a two-story five-bay structure with elements of the Federal style and Greek Revival style. An entrance portico has been removed, but traces remain. The interior is a central hall layout with a parlor and a dining room to either side. Two bedrooms flank the hall upstairs. Finishes are painted plaster walls and ceilings with simple wood moldings.

The Baldwin-Grantham House was listed in the National Register of Historic Places in 1994.
