= Ganotown, West Virginia =

Unincorporated community in West Virginia, United States

Ganotown
- Unincorporated community
- Location within the state of West Virginia Ganotown (the United States)
- Coordinates: 39°24′14″N 78°08′58″W
- Country: United States
- State: West Virginia
- County: Berkeley
- Elevation: 545 ft (166 m)
- Time zone: UTC-5 (Eastern (EST))
  - Summer (DST): UTC-4 (EDT)
- GNIS feature ID: 1554526

Ganotown is an unincorporated community on Back Creek in Berkeley County, West Virginia, United States. It is located at the crossroads of County Routes 7 and 7/19.

The community was named after the local Gano family.
