= John Barker Spring House =

Public springhouse and free drinking-water source in Canton, Ohio

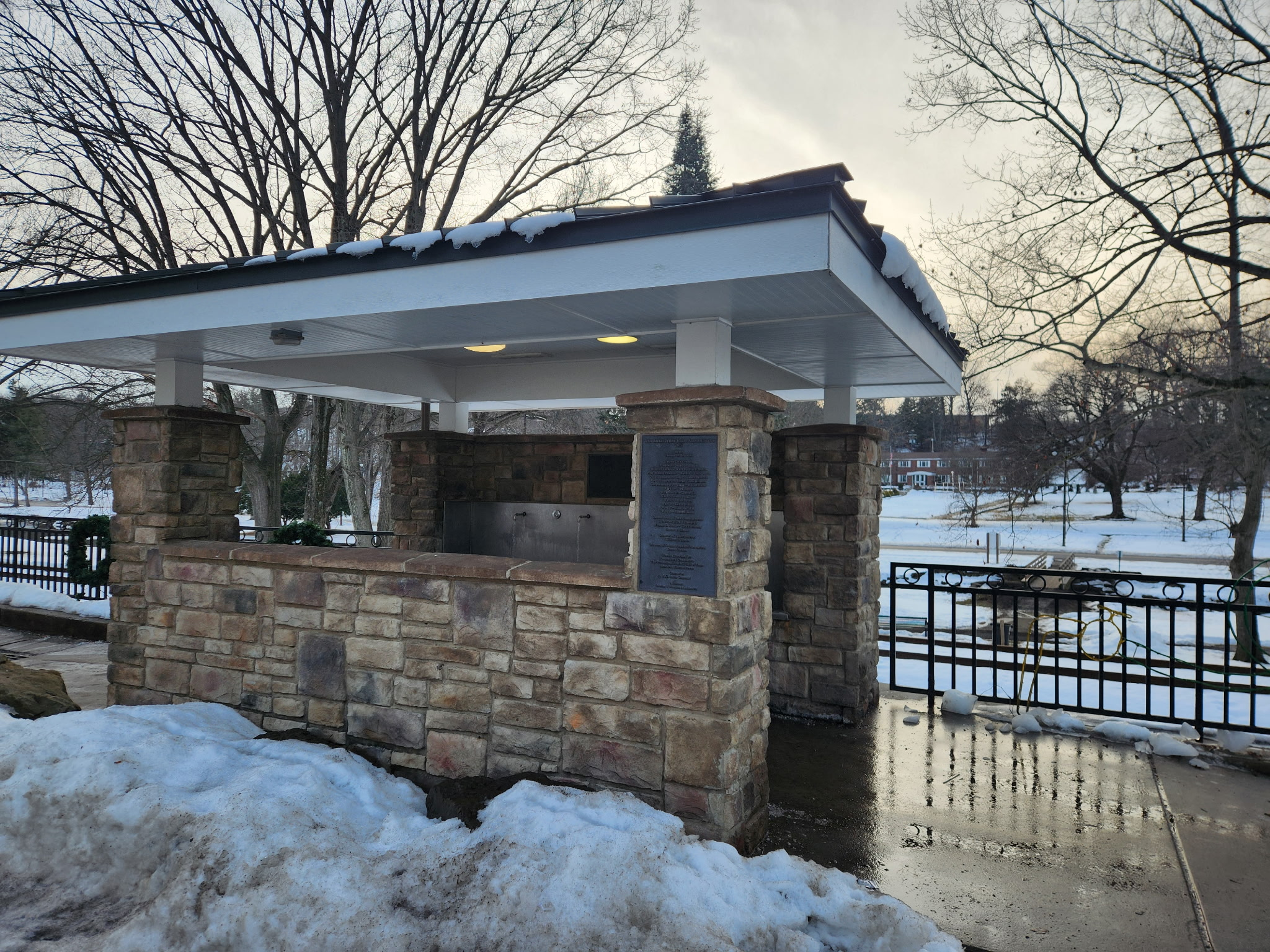
- Exterior photo of the springhouse in winter (2026)
- Interactive map of the John Barker Spring House area
- Alternative names: Barker Springhouse; Barker Spring House

General information
- Type: Springhouse (public drinking water)
- Location: Near Stadium Park (Monument Road/Monument Drive NW area), Canton, Ohio, U.S.
- Coordinates: 40.815159°N 81.391684°W
- Opened: 1968
- Renovated: 2017
- Owner: Canton Parks and Recreation

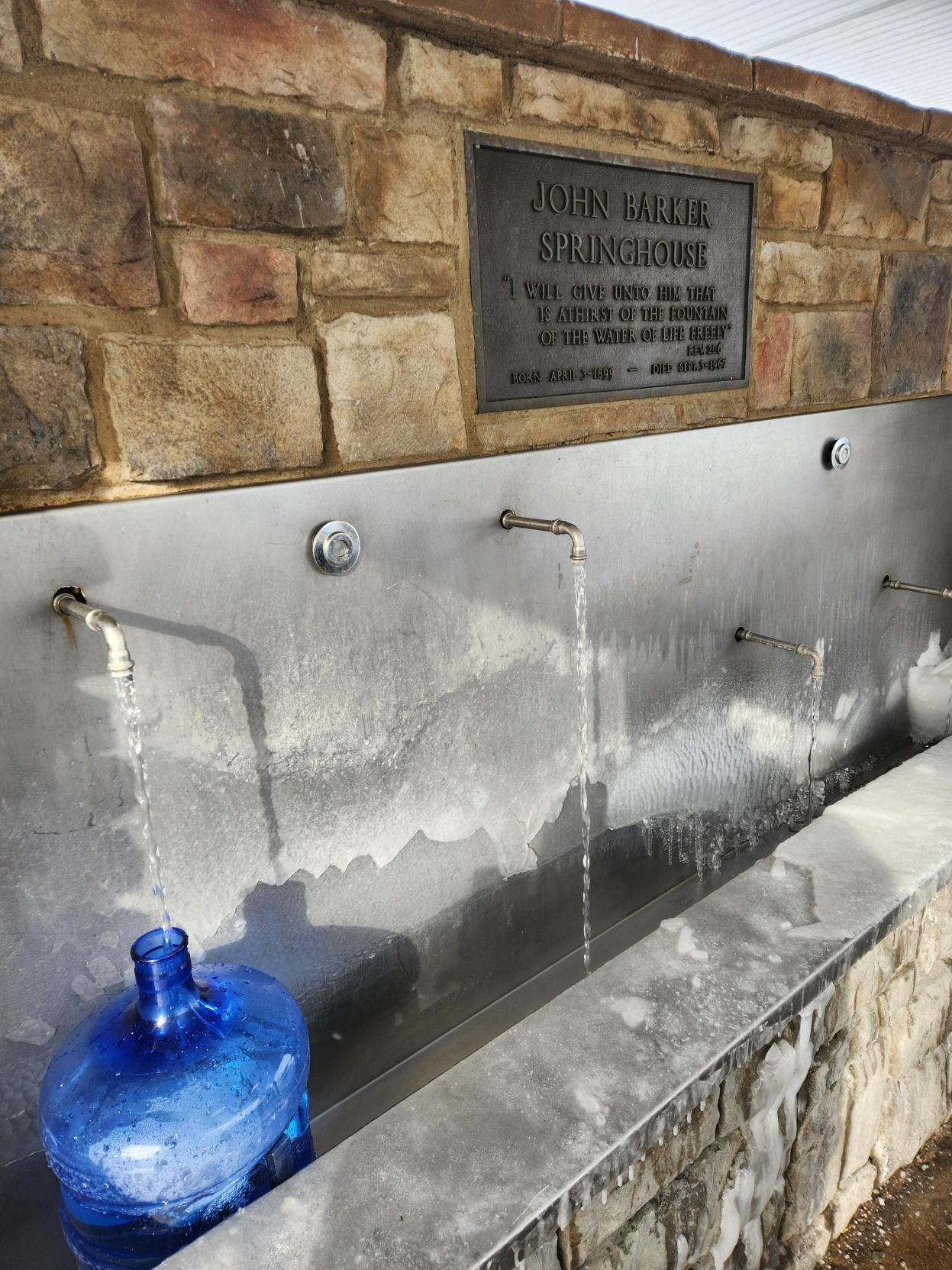
Interior of the springhouse in winter (2026), where you can see the water jug of the photographer being filled up

The John Barker Spring House, named for the Rev. John Barker of Calvary Presbyterian Church, is a public springhouse in Canton, Ohio, providing free spring water. The water comes from a well drilled by the Canton Water Department in the 1920s. The springhouse structure was built in 1968 and reconstructed in 2017.

== History ==
The water source for the springhouse comes from a 6-inch, 200-foot well drilled by the Canton Water Department in the 1920s.At the start, the spring was a simple tap emerging from the hillside. The original structure was built in 1968 and dedicated to the Rev. John Barker of Calvary Presbyterian Church, with the funding for construction provided by donations made in his memory.

== Description and operation ==
The springhouse contains a row of four faucets flowing continuously into a trough. Inside of the springhouse, there is a plaque that references Revelation 21:6.

To ensure safety, the spring water is tested twice a year by the Ohio Environmental Protection Agency.

== Renovation and reconstruction ==
The springhouse closed on July 25, 2015 for exterior renovation, plumbing, and structural upgrades, then reopened briefly in September 2015. It remained open until April 2017, when a plumbing break forced it to close just before the scheduled demolition was to begin. The plumbing and an aging pump had become unreliable, and leaks were deteriorating structural support beams. The building was stripped to its foundation and rebuilt. The new springhouse now uses a stone facade and metal roof in place of the prior brick-and-shingle exterior.

The $96,900 reconstruction was completed by Motter & Meadows Architects and the RG Smith Company, funded by park levy revenue and $40,000 from AEP and the Pro Football Hall of Fame. AEP's part of the funding came from a city settlement it had reached related to an easement through Stadium Park. The springhouse reopened in August 2017, and was rededicated in September.

== Location ==
The springhouse is located by Monument Road and 17th Street NW near Stadium Park in central Canton, and a stop on the West Branch Trail of the Herbert L. Fisher Walking Track.
