= Sleepy Creek Lake =

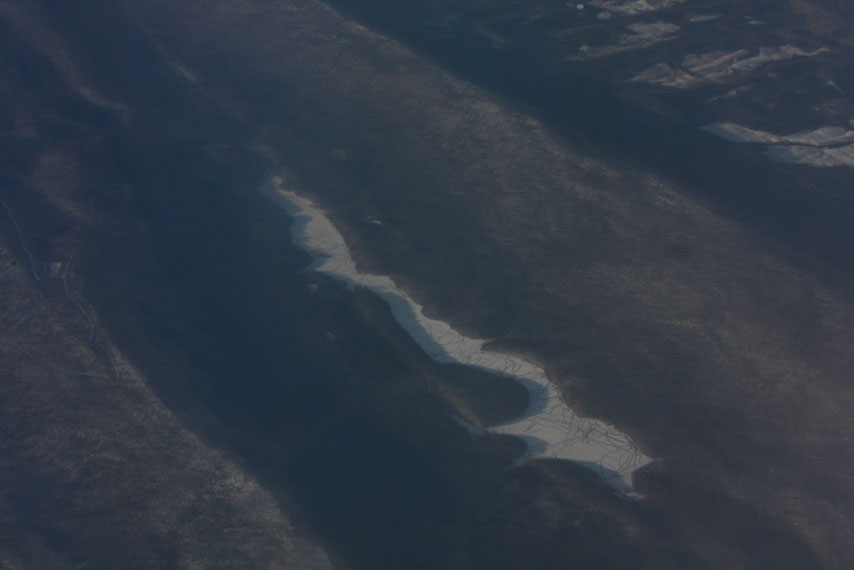
- Oblique air photo of the lake while it was frozen in Jan. 2009

- Location within West Virginia
- Location: Berkeley County, West Virginia
- Coordinates: 39°29′58″N 78°09′54″W
- Type: Reservoir
- Primary inflows: Meadow Branch of Sleepy Creek
- Primary outflows: Meadow Branch of Sleepy Creek
- Basin countries: United States
- Surface area: 205 acres (0.8 km^{2})
- Average depth: 9 ft (2.7 m)
- Max. depth: 26 ft (7.9 m)
- Surface elevation: 1,099 ft (335 m)

Sleepy Creek Lake is a 205-acre (0.8 km^{2}) impoundment of the Meadow Branch of Sleepy Creek in Berkeley County in West Virginia's Eastern Panhandle. The reservoir is located entirely within the Sleepy Creek Wildlife Management Area.

== History ==
Sleepy Creek Lake was constructed by the West Virginia Division of Natural Resources (WVDNR) and was completed in 1962. The lake was opened for fishing in 1964. WVDNR began stocking the reservoir with northern pike in 1989.

== Description ==
Sleepy Creek Lake is a reservoir located at an elevation of 1,099 feet (335 m) within the 23,000-acre (90 km^{2}) Sleepy Creek Wildlife Management Area, which lies within both Morgan and Berkeley counties. The lake is nestled between two mountain ridges: Sleepy Creek Mountain (1,905 feet [581 m]) and Third Hill Mountain (2,172 feet [662 m]). The lake has a maximum depth of 26 feet (7.9 m) and an average depth of nine feet (2.7 m).

Sleepy Creek Lake provides fishing for largemouth bass, bluegill, crappie, northern pike, and channel catfish.

A panorama of Sleepy Creek Lake

== See also ==
- List of lakes of West Virginia
