= De Haven, Virginia =

Unincorporated community in Virginia, United States

- Unincorporated community
- Location within Virginia Location within the United States
- Coordinates: 39°20′59″N 78°11′9″W
- Country: United States
- State: Virginia
- County: Frederick
- Time zone: UTC−5 (Eastern (EST))
  - Summer (DST): UTC−4 (EDT)
- GNIS feature ID: 1499329

De Haven is an unincorporated community in northern Frederick County, Virginia, United States. Originally known as Duck Race, De Haven sprang up as a farming community on Back Creek at its confluence with Babbs Run. De Haven is located on Green Spring Road (VA 671) at Hodges Lane (VA 741).

== Historic sites ==
- Pine Grove School
- Pine Grove United Methodist Church
