= West Virginia Route 127 =

State highway in West Virginia, United States

West Virginia Route 127

Route information
- Maintained by WVDOH
- Length: 7.6 mi (12.2 km)

Major junctions
- West end: WV 29 near Forks of Cacapon
- East end: SR 127 near Good

Location
- Country: United States
- State: West Virginia
- Counties: Hampshire

Highway system
- West Virginia State Highway System; Interstate; US; State
← WV 125	→ WV 129

West Virginia Route 127 is an east–west state highway located in northeast West Virginia. The western terminus is at West Virginia Route 29 near Forks of Cacapon in Hampshire County. The eastern terminus is at the Virginia state line west of U.S. Route 522 and east of Good, where WV 127 continues eastward as State Route 127.

WV 127 is part of the Bloomery Pike, which also encompasses part of WV 29 and SR 127.

== Route description ==
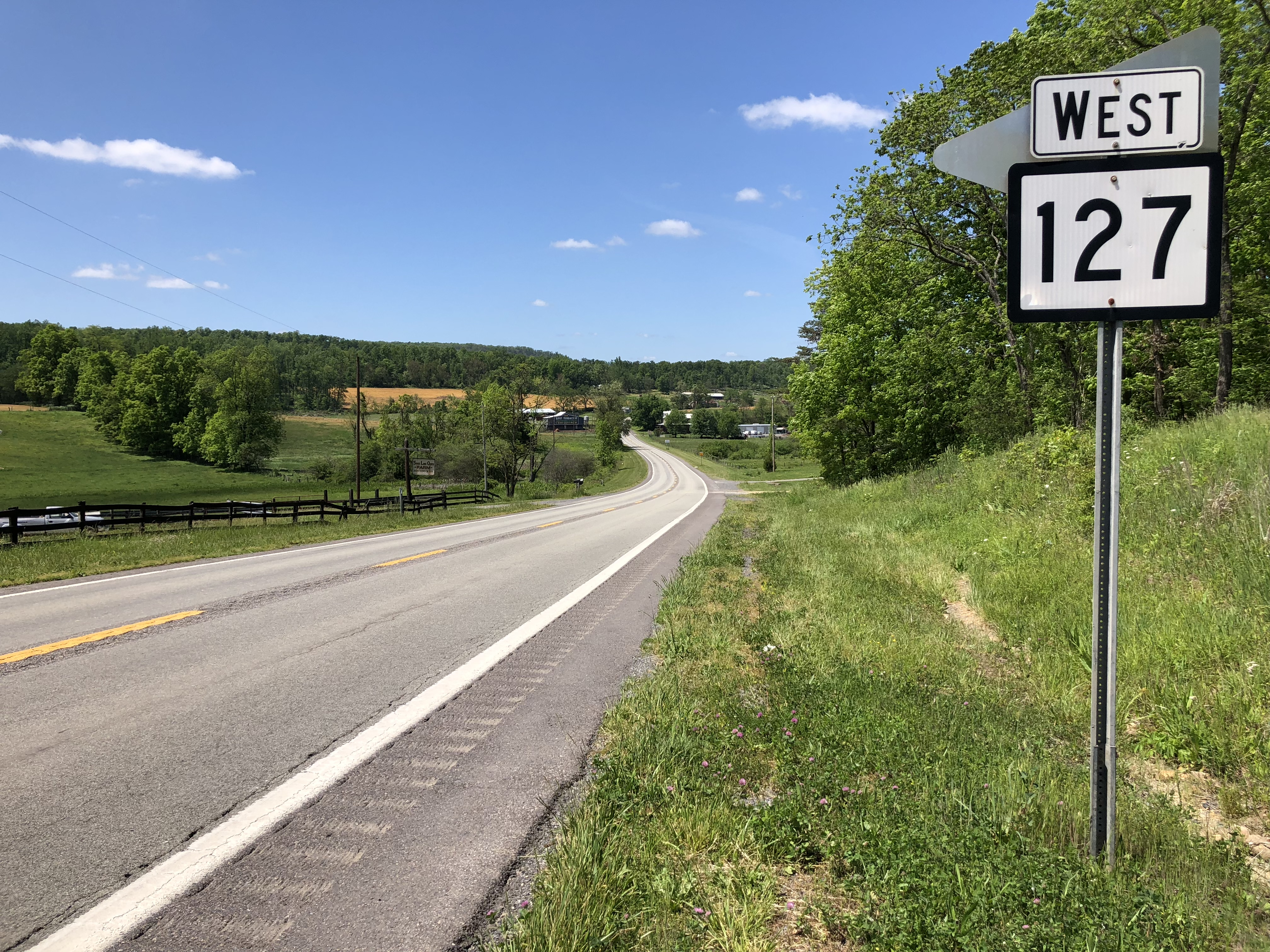
View west along WV 127 just after crossing the Virginia state line near Good

From its western terminus with WV 29 near Forks of Cacapon, WV 127 crosses over the North River. Gaston Road (CR 45/7) serves as a cut-off road between WV 29 and WV 127, and its one-lane arched bridge crosses the North River shortly before its confluence with the Cacapon. WV 127 continues east over the Cacapon River then follows Bloomery Run through Bloomery Gap. The old Bloomery Iron Furnace stands along Bloomery Run with a roadside park on WV 127 located there. From the bloomery furnace, WV 127 curves southeastward through the historic community of Bloomery where its sign reads "Bloomery: On the Road to Everywhere." After Bloomery, WV 127 continues following Bloomery Run past many old stagecoach inns and farmhouses. At a gap in Bear Garden Mountain (1572 ft), WV 127 curves eastward through the community of Good, then straddles the border between Hampshire County and Frederick County, Virginia. WV 127 crosses the Virginia line and becomes VA 127 at the entrance of I.L. Pugh Road (CR 6/2).

== History ==
The West Virginia portion of the Bloomery Pike – WV 29 from U.S. Route 50 near Pleasant Dale to Forks of Cacapon, then WV 127 to the state line – was designated as a discontinuous piece of WV 45 from 1935 through the mid-1970s. As a vestige of this, all secondary routes branching off of both roads have 45 as their numerator.

== Major intersections ==
The entire route is in Hampshire County.

Location	mi	km	Destinations	Notes
			WV 29 to US 50 – Paw Paw	
Good			SR 127 east to US 522	
1.000 mi = 1.609 km; 1.000 km = 0.621 mi
