= Holton, West Virginia =

Holton
- Unincorporated community
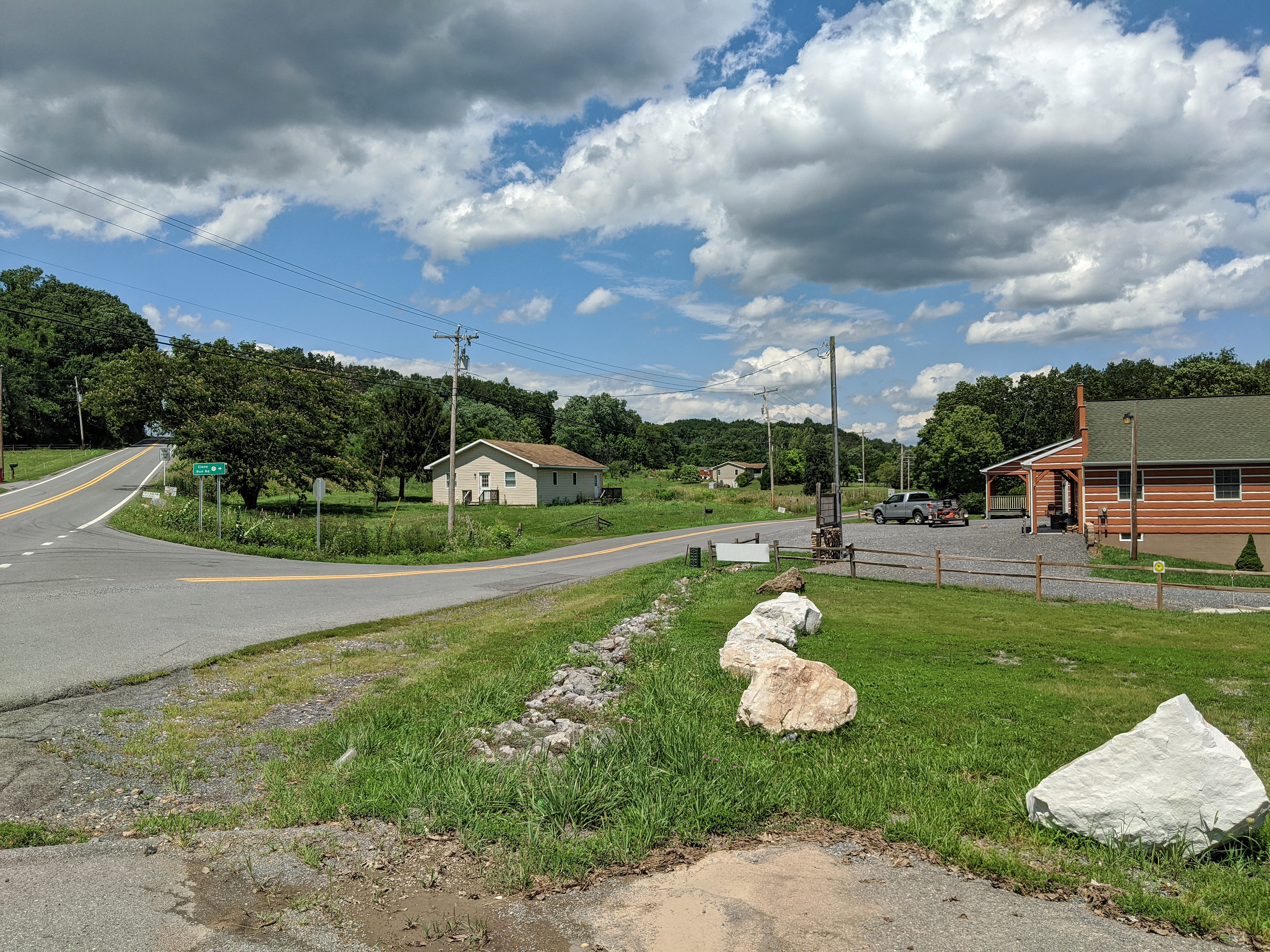
- Corner of West Virginia Route 9 and Clone Run Road in Holton

- Location within the state of West Virginia Holton (the United States)
- Coordinates: 39°36′8″N 78°4′11″W
- Country: United States
- State: West Virginia
- County: Morgan
- Time zone: UTC-5 (Eastern (EST))
  - Summer (DST): UTC-4 (EDT)
- GNIS feature ID: 1554729

Holton is a small unincorporated community in northeastern Morgan County in the U.S. state of West Virginia. Holton lies on Martinsburg Road (West Virginia Route 9) at its junction with Cherry Run Road (County Route 5) along Cherry Run and the Berkeley County line. Holton had its own post office in operation between 1889 and 1903. Pleasant View Elementary School, one of three elementary schools still operational in Morgan County as of 2020, is located in Holton.

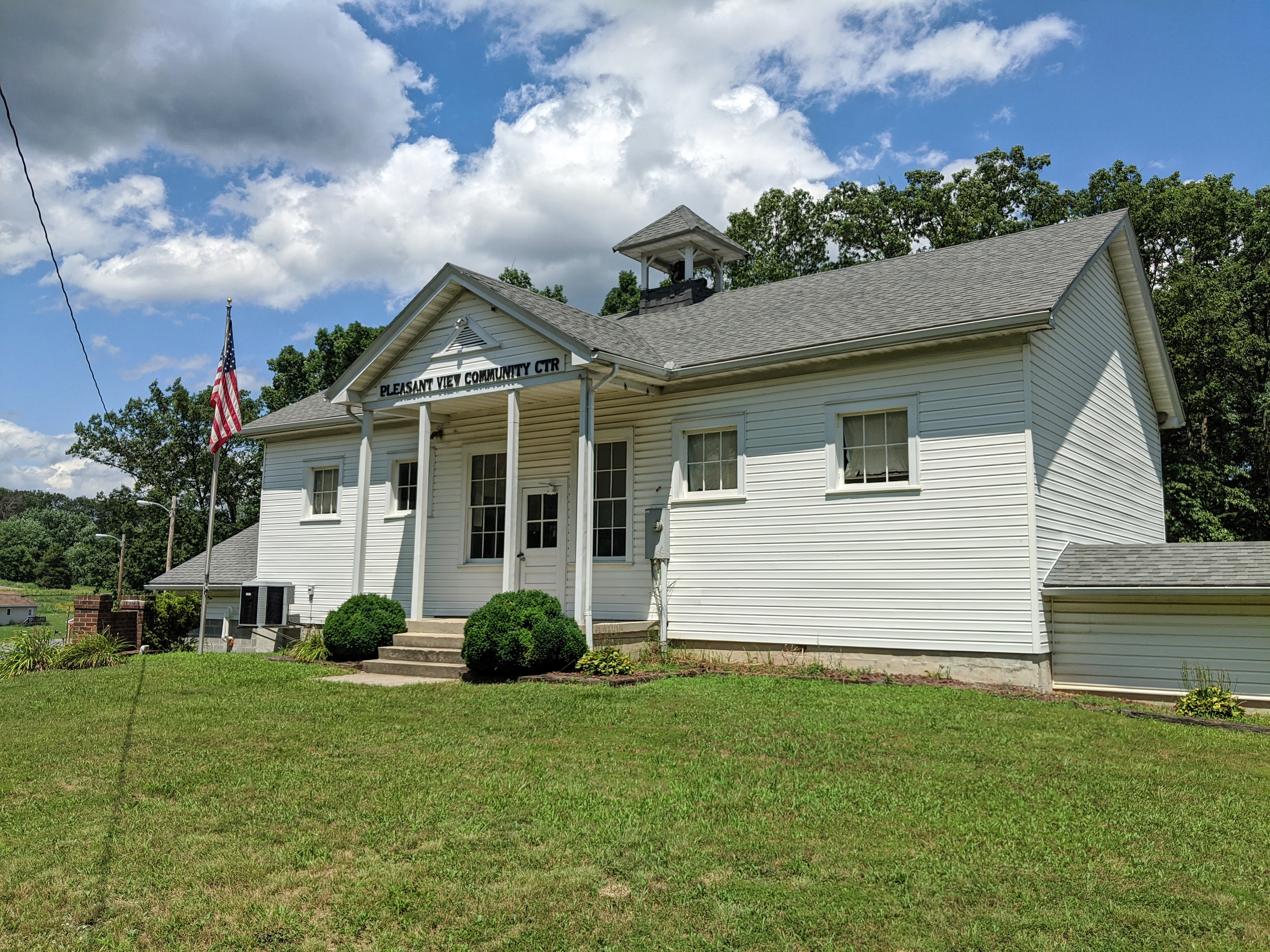
Pleasant View Community Center, a former two-room schoolhouse in Holton
