= Sleepy Creek, West Virginia =

Sleepy Creek
- Unincorporated community
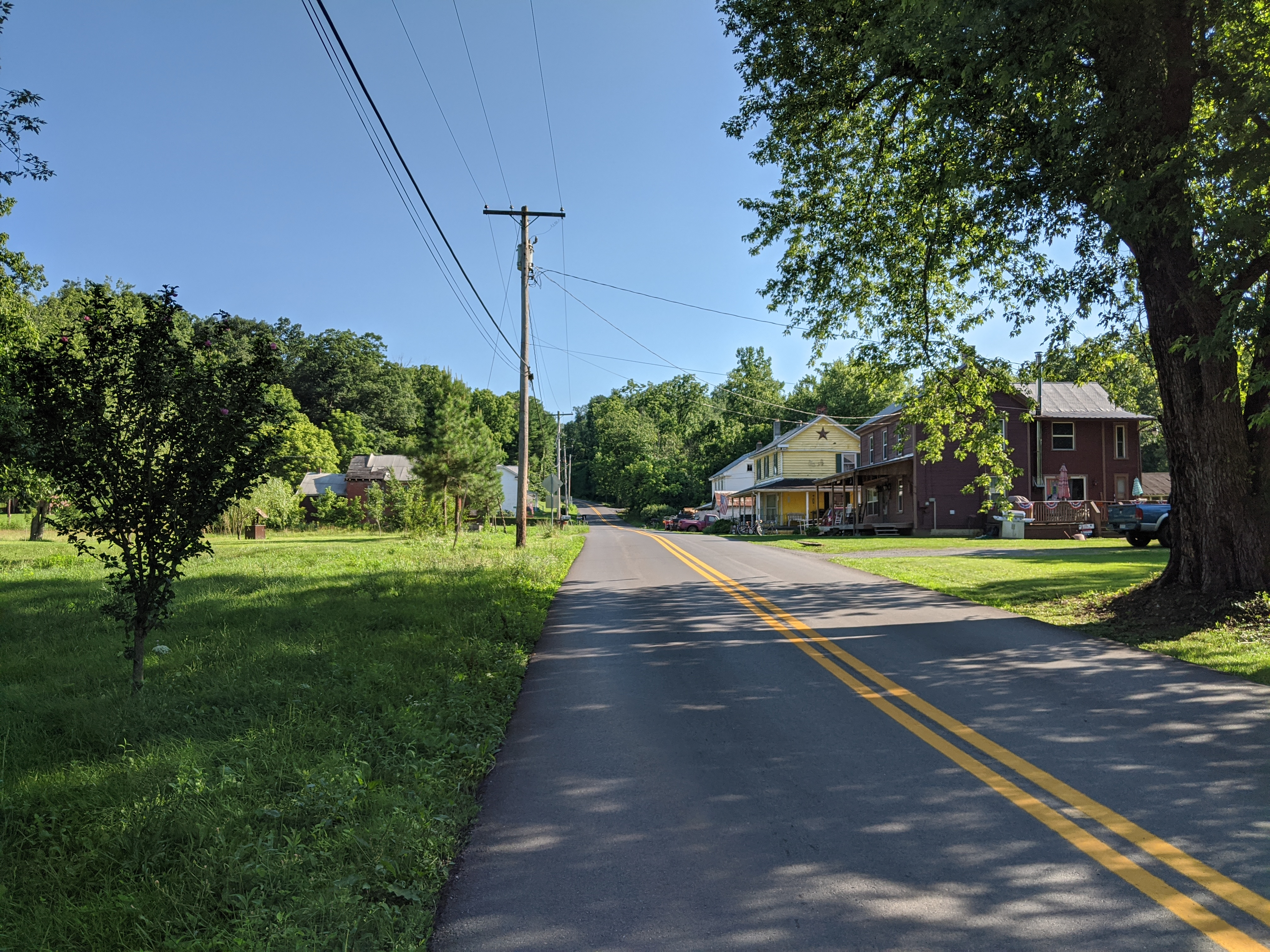
- River Road (County Route 1) eastbound in Sleepy Creek

- Location within the state of West Virginia Sleepy Creek (the United States)
- Coordinates: 39°40′1″N 78°4′57″W
- Country: United States
- State: West Virginia
- County: Morgan
- Time zone: UTC-5 (Eastern (EST))
  - Summer (DST): UTC-4 (EDT)
- GNIS feature ID: 1555645

Sleepy Creek is an unincorporated community in Morgan County, West Virginia on the Potomac River at the mouth of Sleepy Creek. By 1860, Sleepy Creek had a post office and functioned as an important station on the Baltimore and Ohio Railroad.

Sleepy Creek is located along River Road (Morgan County Route 1) east of Hancock and is accessible from Cherry Run to its east by way of Householder Road (County Route 10).

The community was named after nearby Sleepy Creek.
