= Park's Gap Bridge =

- U.S. National Register of Historic Places
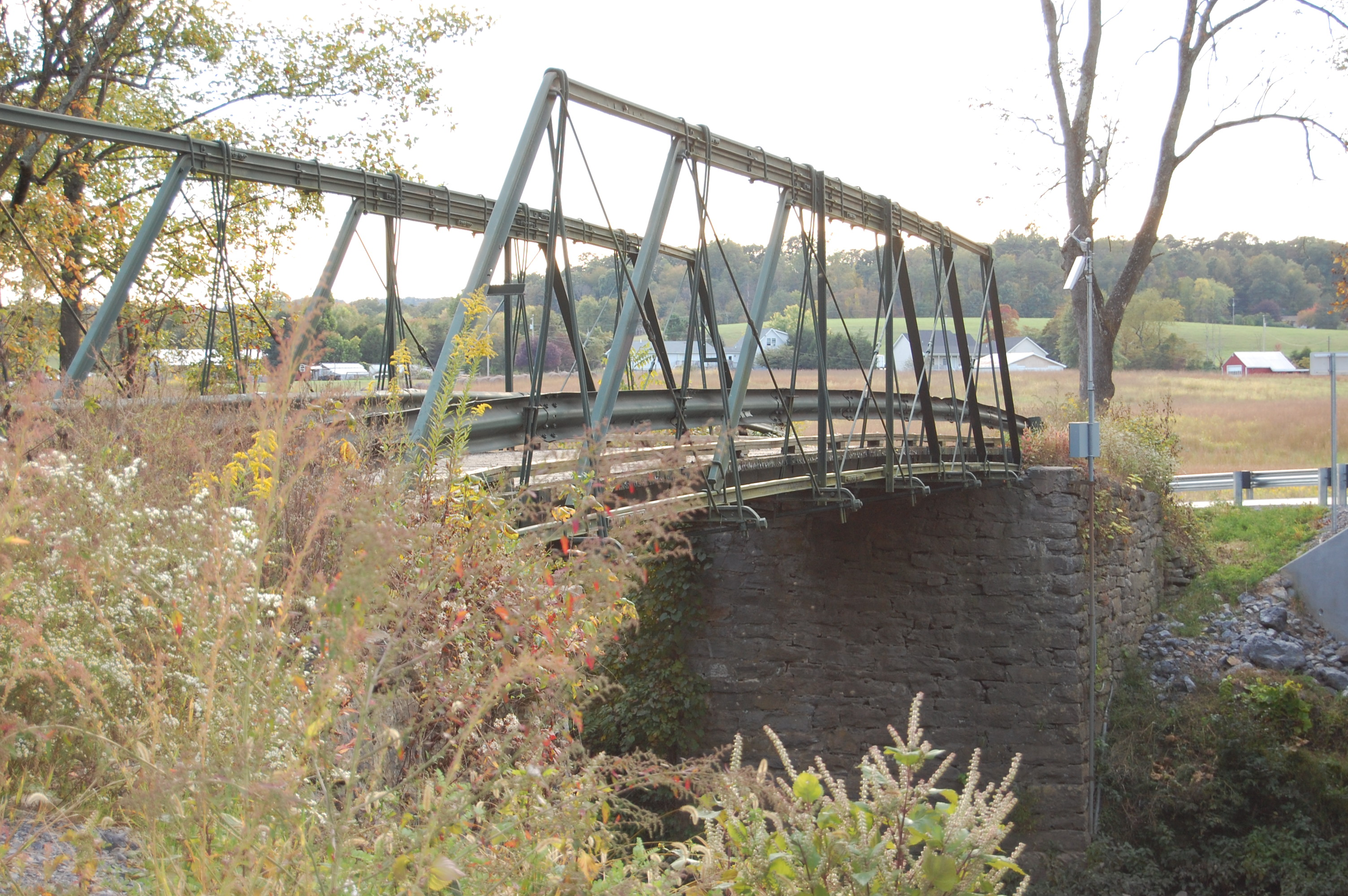

- Location within West Virginia Location within the United States
- Nearest city: Route 6 over Back Creek, near Martinsburg, West Virginia
- Coordinates: 39°30′45″N 78°2′11″W
- Area: 0.1 acres (0.040 ha)
- Built: 1892
- Architect: Vulcan Road Machine Company
- Architectural style: Modified Howe Truss
- NRHP reference No.: 94001299
- Added to NRHP: November 04, 1994

Park's Gap Bridge is a historic Howe Truss bridge located near Martinsburg, at Tomahawk, Berkeley County, West Virginia. It was built in 1892, and has a span 93 feet (28 m) long and 12 feet (3.7 m) wide over Back Creek. It is a simple span pony truss supported on stone abutments.

It was listed on the National Register of Historic Places in 1994.

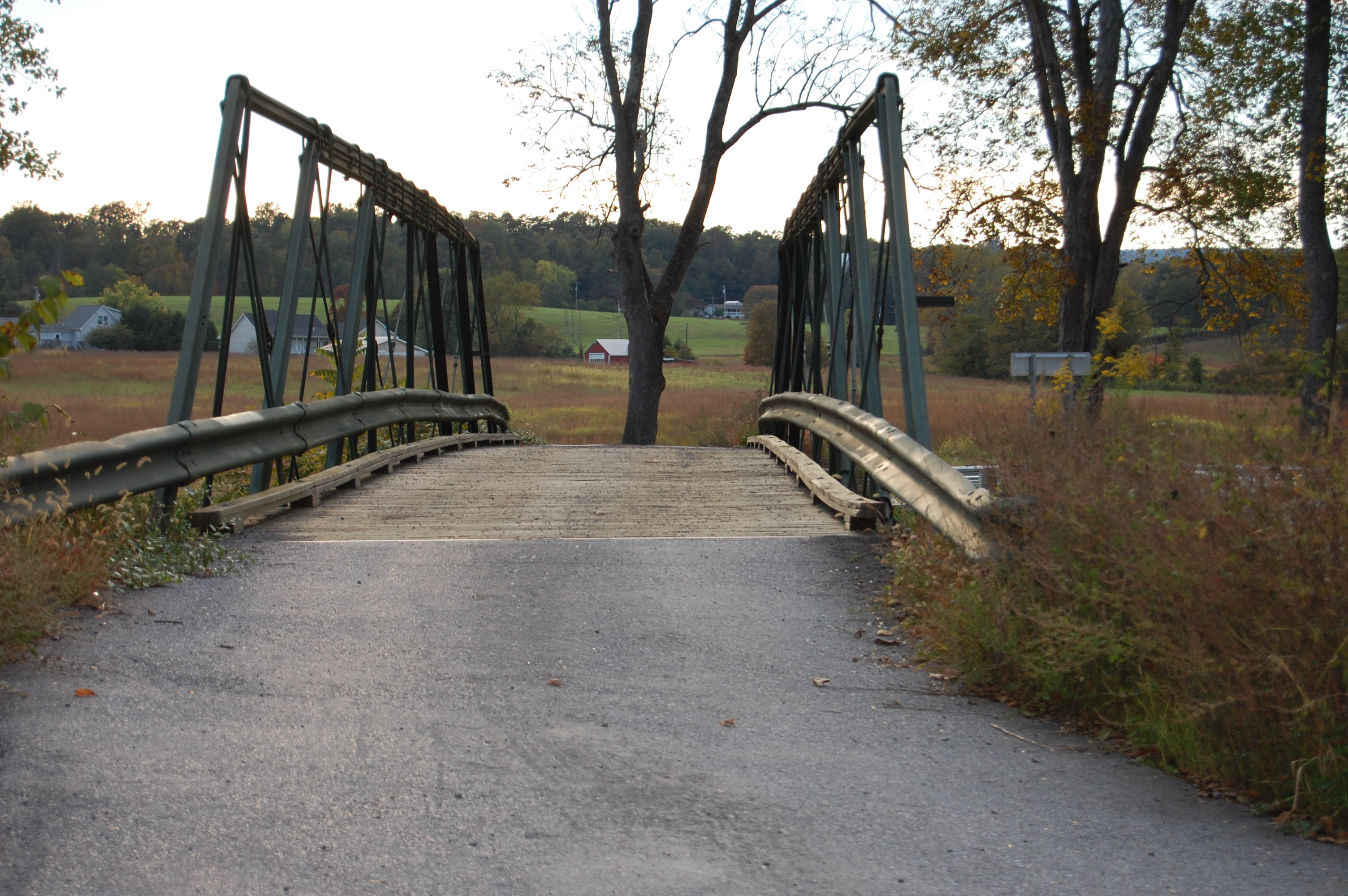
Another view of the bridge
