= Virginia State Route 127 =

State highway in Frederick County, Virginia, US

State Route 127
- Bloomery Pike

Route information
- Maintained by VDOT
- Length: 3.35 mi (5.39 km)
- Existed: 1964–present

Major junctions
- West end: WV 127 at Good, WV
- East end: US 522 near Cross Junction

Location
- Country: United States
- State: Virginia
- Counties: Frederick

Highway system
- Virginia Routes; Interstate; US; Primary; Secondary; Byways; History; HOT lanes
| ← SR 126 | → SR 128 |

State Route 127 (SR 127) is a primary state highway in the U.S. state of Virginia. The state highway begins at the West Virginia state line at Good, West Virginia, where the highway continues west as West Virginia Route 127 (WV 127). SR 127 heads east 3.55 miles (5.71 km) to U.S. Route 522 (US 522) near Cross Junction in northwestern Frederick County. SR 127 is the easternmost portion of Bloomery Pike, a turnpike that connected Winchester with the namesake iron smelting center.

== Route description ==
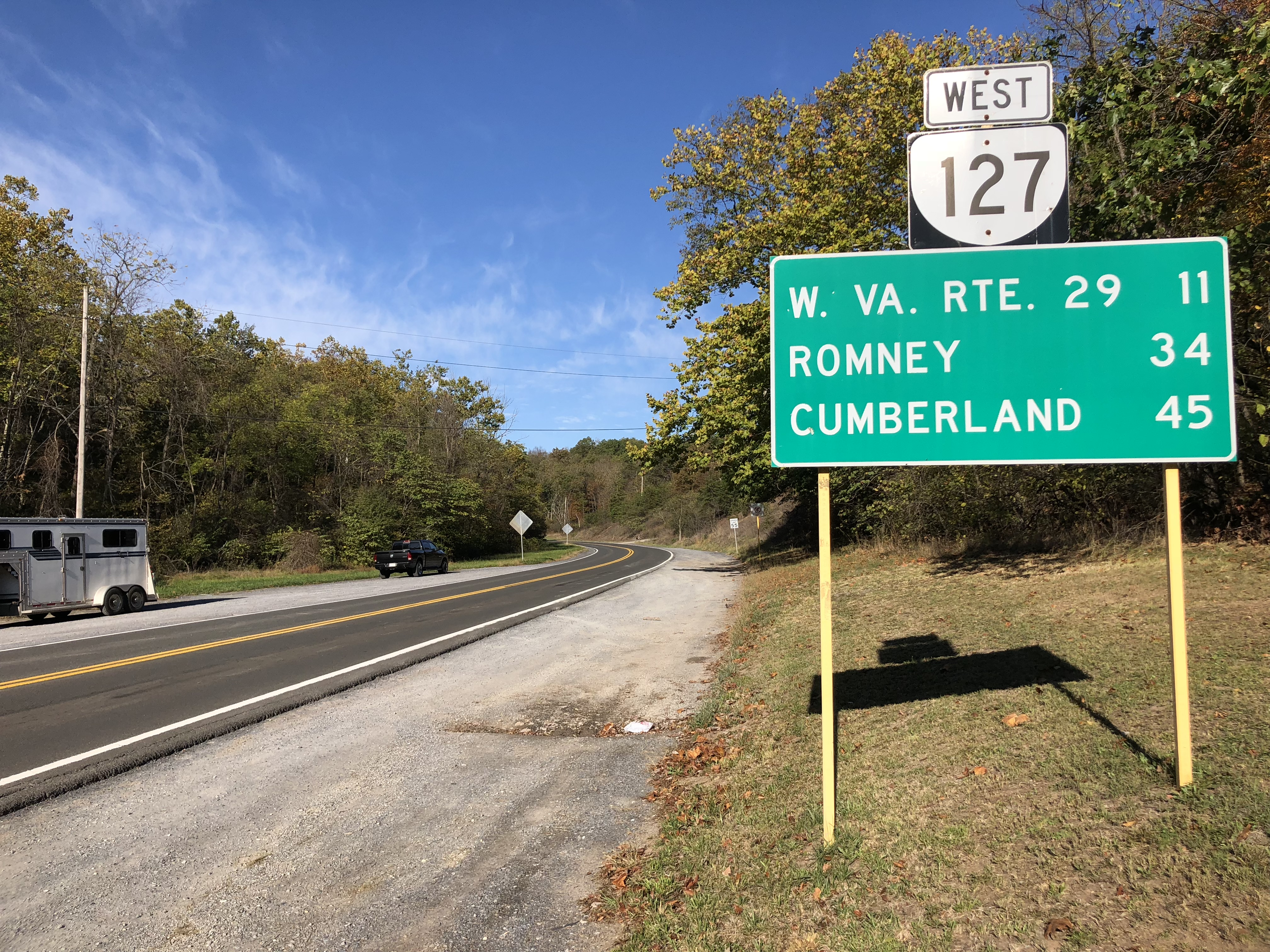
View west along SR 127 at US 522 near Cross Junction

SR 127 begins on the West Virginia state line in northwestern Frederick County near the West Virginia hamlet of Good. The point where SR 127 begins is an arbitrary point on the state line where West Virginia maintenance on the road begins and signs reflecting the state and county are posted. Bloomery Pike continues west as WV 127, which passes through the historic community of Bloomery on its way to a junction with WV 29 at Forks of Cacapon. SR 127 heads east atop the state line until the highway fully enters Virginia at Timber Ridge, where the state line turns south. The state highway descends from Timber Ridge into the valley of Crockett Run, which the highway follows to its eastern terminus at US 522 (Frederick Pike) northwest of Cross Junction.

== Major intersections ==
The entire route is in Frederick County.

| Location | mi | km | Destinations | Notes |
|---|---|---|---|---|
| | 0.00 | 0.00 | WV 127 west (Bloomery Pike) – Romney, Cumberland | West Virginia state line; western terminus |
| | 3.55 | 5.71 | US 522 (North Frederick Pike) – Berkeley Springs, Winchester | Eastern terminus |
1.000 mi = 1.609 km; 1.000 km = 0.621 mi
