= New Hope, Morgan County, West Virginia =

New Hope
- Unincorporated community
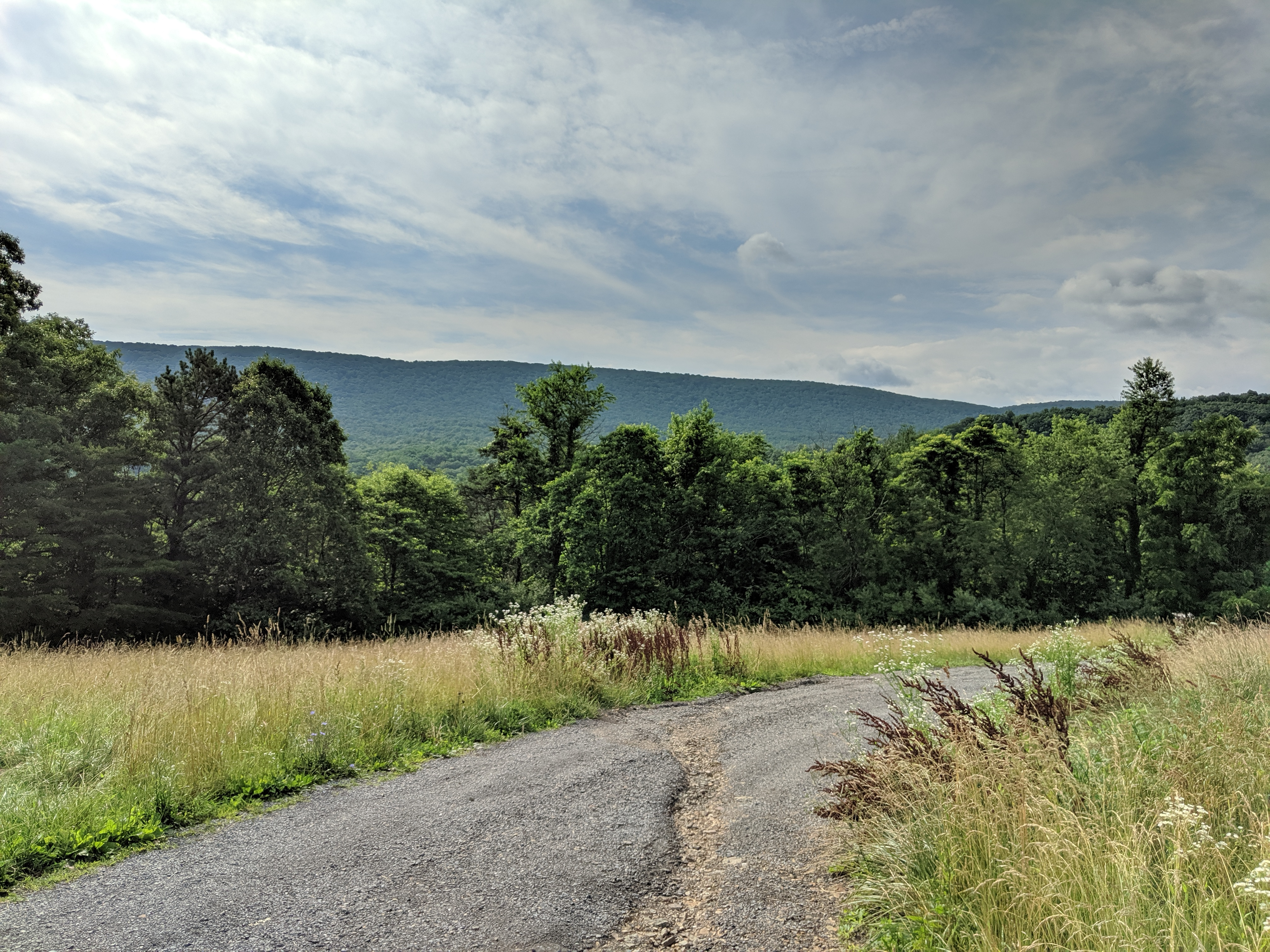
- View of Sleepy Creek Mountain from a hillside in New Hope

- Location within the state of West Virginia New Hope (the United States)
- Coordinates: 39°35′48″N 78°10′26″W
- Country: United States
- State: West Virginia
- County: Morgan
- Time zone: UTC-5 (Eastern (EST))
  - Summer (DST): UTC-4 (EDT)
- GNIS feature ID: 1549850

New Hope is an unincorporated community in Morgan County in the U.S. state of West Virginia's Eastern Panhandle. New Hope lies at the confluence of Yellow Spring Run and Sleepy Creek.
