= Back Creek (Potomac River tributary) =

Tributary of the Potomac River in Virginia, United States

Coordinates: 39.598559°N 77.992049°W

Back Creek is a 59.5-mile-long (95.8 km) tributary of the Potomac River that flows north from Frederick County, Virginia, to Berkeley County in West Virginia's Eastern Panhandle. Back Creek originates along Frederick County's border with Hampshire County, West Virginia, at Farmer's Gap in the Great North Mountain. Its name reflects its location to the west of North Mountain. The perspective of colonists from the east in the 18th century led them to call it "Back Creek", because it lay to the back of North Mountain.

== Course ==
=== Source to Gore ===
Back Creek's headwaters rise at Farmer's Gap in Great North Mountain. From its source, the creek flows northwest along the western edge of Burnt Ridge off the mountain. It turns toward the northeast, and the shallow stream flows along the western flanks of Great North Mountain, with White Pine Ridge bounding it to its west. Back Creek is joined by a series of mountain streams, including Reed Creek and Lauren Run, both flowing off Great North Mountain. At Dunlap Ford, Back Creek is joined to its west by waters from Gallows Ridge and to its east by those from Cove Ridge. There, it is also joined by Laurel Run, which carries the spring waters from Rock Enon Springs from the east. Capper Ridge bounds Back Creek to its west at Pooles Ford as it makes its way towards Gore, Virginia. This region on the western flanks of Great North Mountain is rich in sandstone and sand deposits, hence the sand mines at Gore. At Gore, Back Creek is joined by Mine Spring and Dry runs.

=== Gore to De Haven ===
From Gore, Back Creek flows parallel to the south of the Northwestern Turnpike (U.S. Route 50) and the Winchester and Western Railroad. It flows under US 50 along Bowling Green Ridge where it turns east towards Gainesboro, the site of its confluence with Tavenner Run. From Gainesboro, Back Creek flows beneath the North Frederick Pike (U.S. Route 522). At Grave Hill, north of Lew, Back Creek is joined by its two major tributaries: Isaacs Creek and Hogue Creek. From its fork with Hogue Creek, the stream is bounded by Hunting Ridge to its east. By its confluence with Brush Creek at Baileys Ford, Back Creek is a large stream with increased water flow with depths up to a few feet. Back Creek meanders northward through the community of De Haven at Warm Springs Ford. Shortly after its horseshoe bend at De Haven, Back Creek flows into Berkeley County, West Virginia.

=== De Haven to mouth ===
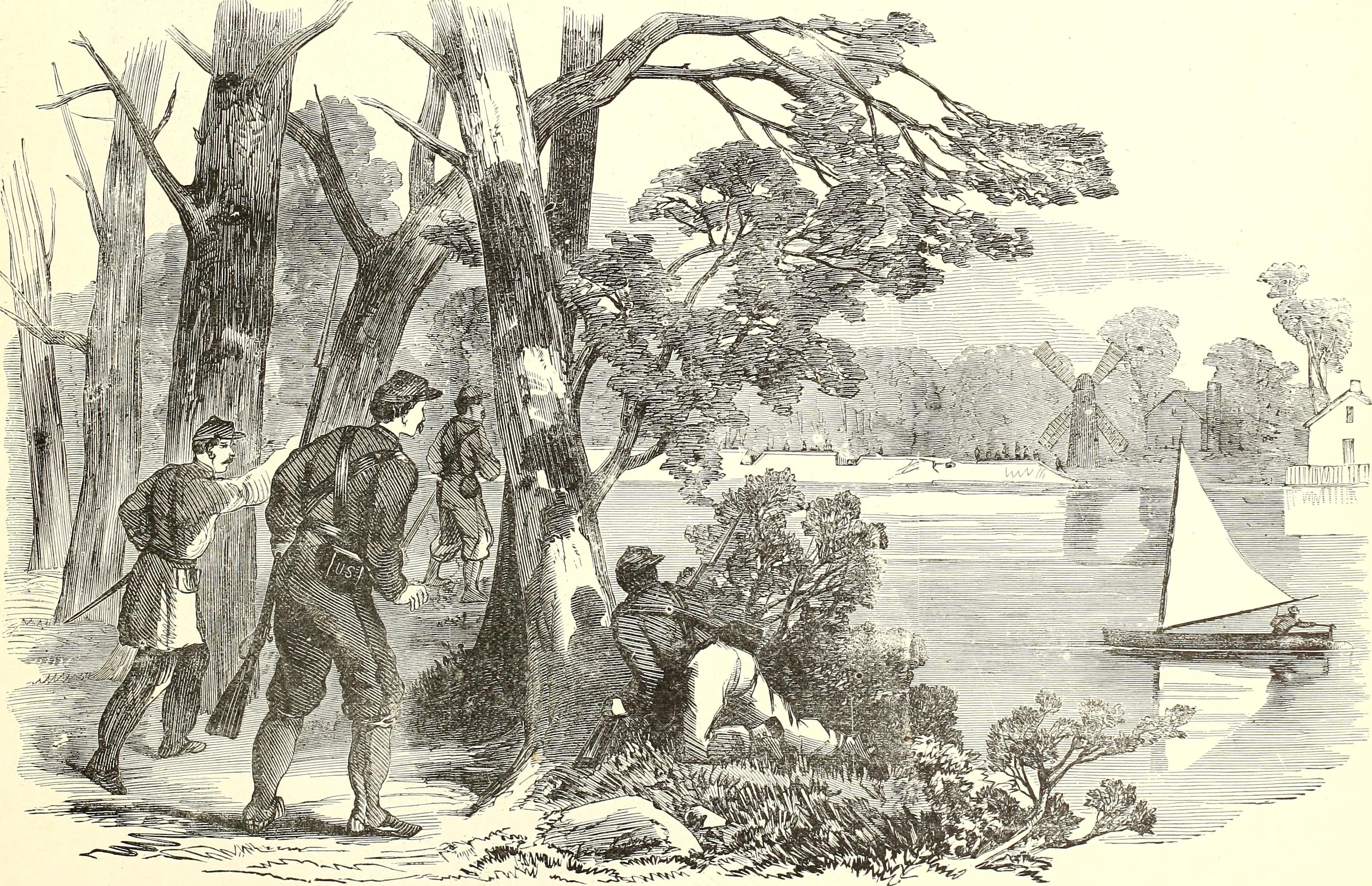
Discovery of a new rebel battery at Messech's Point, near the mouth of Back River by a scouting party of the Tenth Regiment of New York Zouaves, before September 1861

Once Back Creek flows into West Virginia, it is fed from numerous spring streams from North Mountain's western flank. Through Berkeley County, Back Creek flows through an expansive valley. It continues north by the community of Glengary which developed near it, is crossed by West Virginia Route 45, and goes past Ganotown. North of Ganotown, after the confluence with Tub Run, Leading Ridge forms the western edge of Back Creek's valley. It meanders northeast through the community of Shanghai. From Shanghai, Back Creek continues to be fed by spring streams off North Mountain. With North Mountain bounding it to the east, Back Creek continues northeast, lined by several communities, including Tomahawk, Hedgesville, and Soho. The Park's Gap Bridge crosses Back Creek at Tomahawk. It was listed on the National Register of Historic Places in 1994.

Northeast of Soho, Back Creek is joined by another of its major tributaries, Tilhance Creek. The Baltimore and Ohio Railroad mainline bridge crosses Back Creek before it flows past Allensville, where it finally empties into the Potomac River.

== Tributaries ==
Streams are listed from south (source) to north (mouth).

- Reed Creek
- Laurel Run
- White Pine Branch
- Mine Spring Run
- Dry Run
- Albin Run
- Tavenner Run
- Isaacs Creek
- Hogue Creek
- Brush Creek
  - Babbs Run
  - Pearris Run
  - Cattail Run
  - Green Springs Run
- Tub Run
- Tilhance Creek
  - Whites Run
  - Higgins Run

== List of cities and towns along Back Creek ==
- Allensville
- De Haven
- Gainesboro
- Ganotown
- Glengary
- Gore
- Hedgesville
- Jones Springs
- Shanghai
- Soho
- Tomahawk

== See also ==
- List of West Virginia rivers
- List of Virginia rivers
