= Tomahawk Spring =

- U.S. National Register of Historic Places
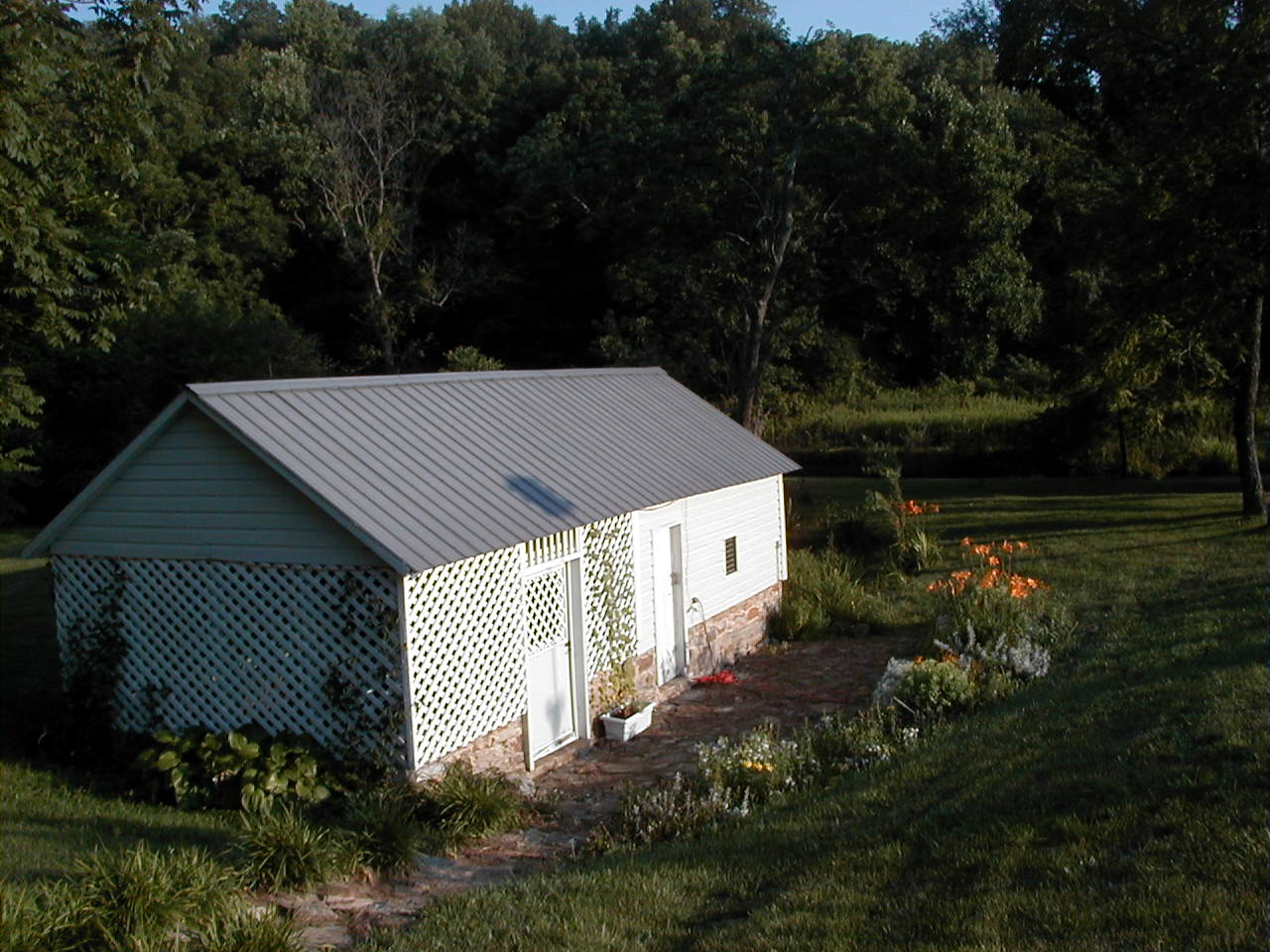
- Tomahawk Springhouse, July 1999

- Location within West Virginia Location within the United States
- Location: Co. Rt. 7/2, Tomahawk, West Virginia
- Coordinates: 39°31′52″N 78°3′27″W
- Area: 0.7 acres (0.28 ha)
- Built: 1860
- NRHP reference No.: 94001344
- Added to NRHP: December 1, 1994

Tomahawk Spring is a historic spring house located near Martinsburg, at Tomahawk, Berkeley County, West Virginia. It was built about 1860 on the stone foundation of a previous building. It is a one-story, wood-frame structure atop a three-foot-tall stone foundation in two sections. The first section is atop the spring and is approximately 16 by 12 feet (4.9 by 3.7 m), surrounded by a lattice enclosure. The second section contains a pool and is 13 by 12 feet (4.0 by 3.7 m).

It was listed on the National Register of Historic Places in 1994.
