= Good, West Virginia =

Unincorporated community in West Virginia, US

- Unincorporated community
- Location within West Virginia Location within the United States
- Coordinates: 39°21′27″N 78°21′40″W
- Country: United States
- State: West Virginia
- County: Hampshire
- Time zone: UTC-5 (Eastern (EST))
  - Summer (DST): UTC-4 (EDT)
- GNIS feature ID: 1539496

Good is an unincorporated community in northeastern Hampshire County, West Virginia, United States atop Bear Garden Mountain. Good is located on the Bloomery Pike (West Virginia Route 127) at I.L. Pugh Road (West Virginia Secondary Route 6/2) east of Bloomery and northwest of Winchester on the West Virginia/Virginia border. Good partly lies in Frederick County, Virginia.

== Historic site ==
- Laurel Hill Church, WV 127 at I.L. Pugh Road
