= Tomahawk, West Virginia =

Tomahawk
- Unincorporated community
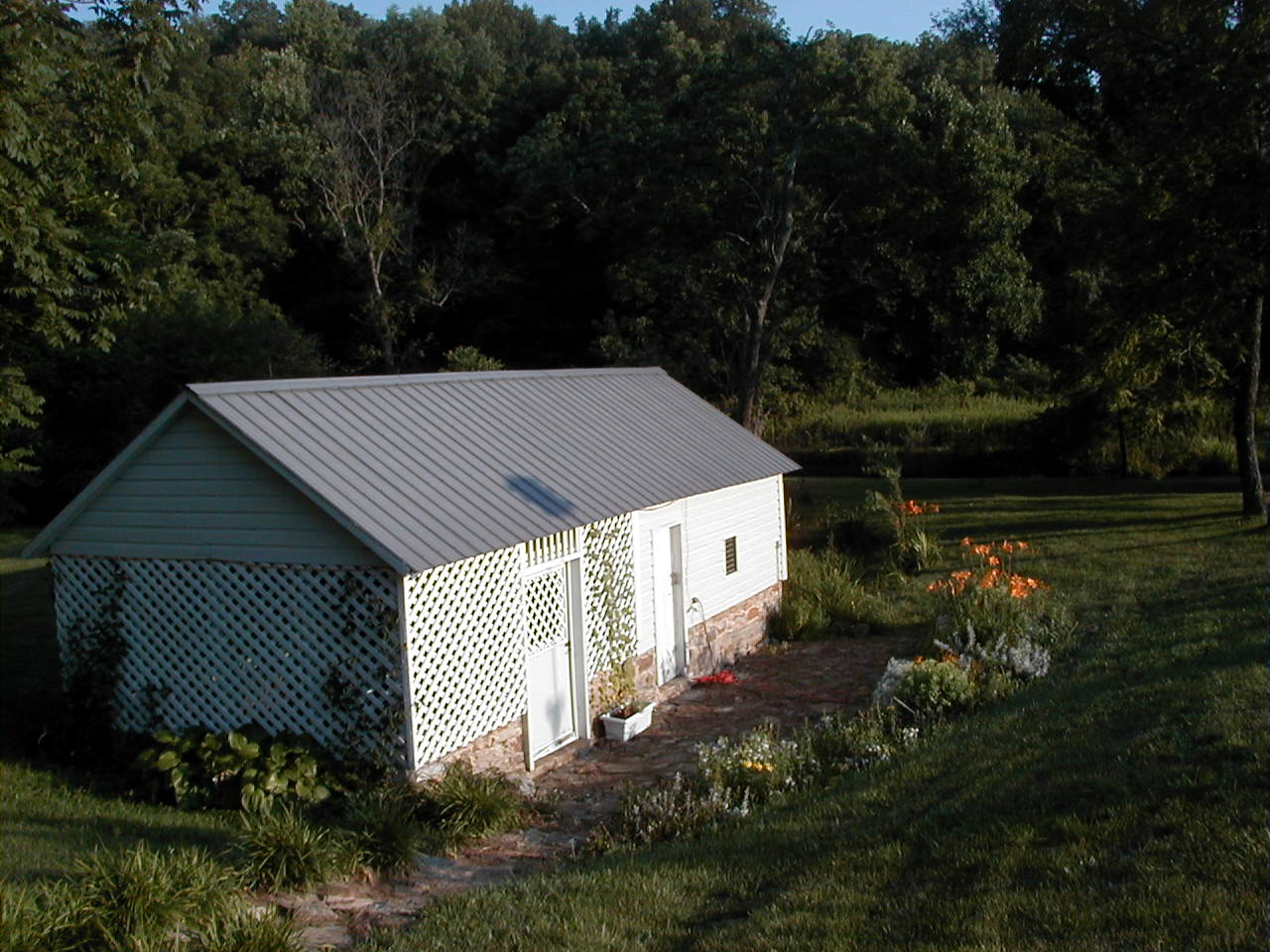
- Tomahawk Springhouse

- Location within the state of West Virginia Tomahawk (the United States)
- Coordinates: 39°31′49″N 78°02′49″W
- Country: United States
- State: West Virginia
- County: Berkeley
- Elevation: 466 ft (142 m)
- Time zone: UTC-5 (Eastern (EST))
  - Summer (DST): UTC-4 (EDT)
- GNIS feature ID: 1555816

Tomahawk is an unincorporated community on Back Creek in Berkeley County, West Virginia, United States. The community is named for a nearby series of springs in the shape of a tomahawk. The community includes the historic Tomahawk Presbyterian Church, established c. 1745, and its adjacent community cemetery, which has gravestones dating to the late 18th century. Tomahawk also has a popular dirt bike racetrack. The community lies 9.5 miles from Martinsburg.

Tomahawk Spring and the Park's Gap Bridge were listed on the National Register of Historic Places in 1994.
