= Third Hill Mountain =

Mountain in the U.S. state of West Virginia

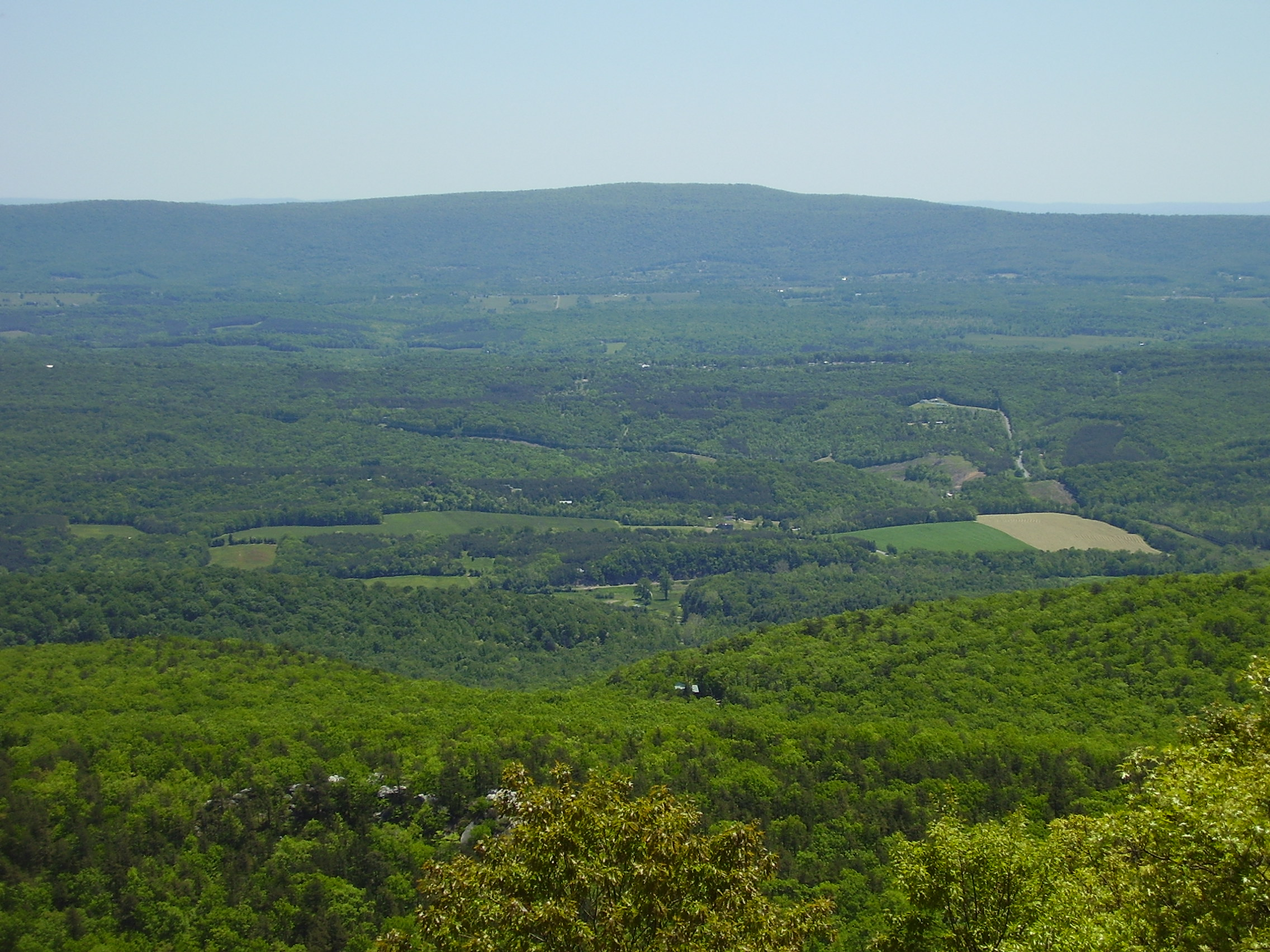
- High Knob, the summit of Third Hill Mountain, as viewed from Cacapon Mountain

Highest point
- Elevation: 2,165 ft (660 m)
- Prominence: 1,142 ft (348 m)
- Coordinates: 39.53°N 78.11°W

Geography
- Location within West Virginia
- Location: Berkeley County, West Virginia, U.S.
- Parent range: Ridge-and-Valley Appalachians
- Topo map: USGS Glengary

Third Hill Mountain is both the highest and most topographically prominent mountain in Berkeley County within the Eastern Panhandle of West Virginia. Third Hill Mountain reaches its highest elevation of 2,165 feet (660 m) above sea-level southeast of the "Locks-of-the-Mountain" where it "locks" with Sleepy Creek Mountain. The long distance Tuscarora Trail passes along ridge and bench of the mountain.

== Adjacent area ==
Together with Sleepy Creek Mountain, the two mountains contain between them Sleepy Creek Lake and the Sleepy Creek Wildlife Management Area. Sleepy Creek and Third Hill Mountains are distinctive for their height in the relatively level terrain of the far Eastern Panhandle region of West Virginia.
