= Shanghai, West Virginia =

Shanghai
- Unincorporated community
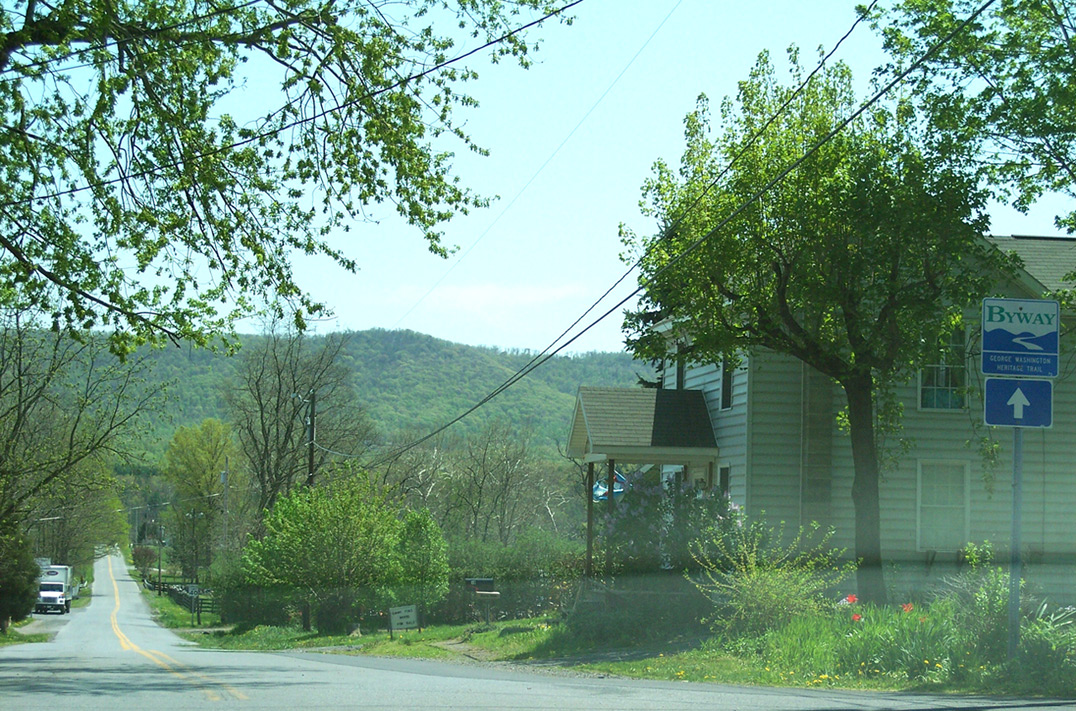
- Shanghai, WV at the main intersection

- Location within the state of West Virginia Shanghai (the United States)
- Coordinates: 39°26′29″N 78°07′56″W
- Country: United States
- State: West Virginia
- County: Berkeley

Area
  - Total: 204 sq mi (528 km^{2})
- Elevation: 528 ft (161 m)
- Time zone: UTC-5 (Eastern (EST))
  - Summer (DST): UTC-4 (EDT)
- GNIS feature ID: 1546614

Shanghai is an unincorporated community in Berkeley County, West Virginia, United States. The town is nestled in Back Creek Valley between Leading Ridge and North Mountain. Shanghai lies at the junction of West Virginia Secondary Route 7 (Back Creek Valley Road) and Secondary Route 18 (Tuscarora Pike).

The community was named after a local lumber company, the Shanghai Manufacturing Association. The Baldwin-Grantham House in Shanghai is a historic home listed on the National Register of Historic Places.
