= Bloomery, Hampshire County, West Virginia =

Unincorporated community in West Virginia, United States

- Unincorporated community
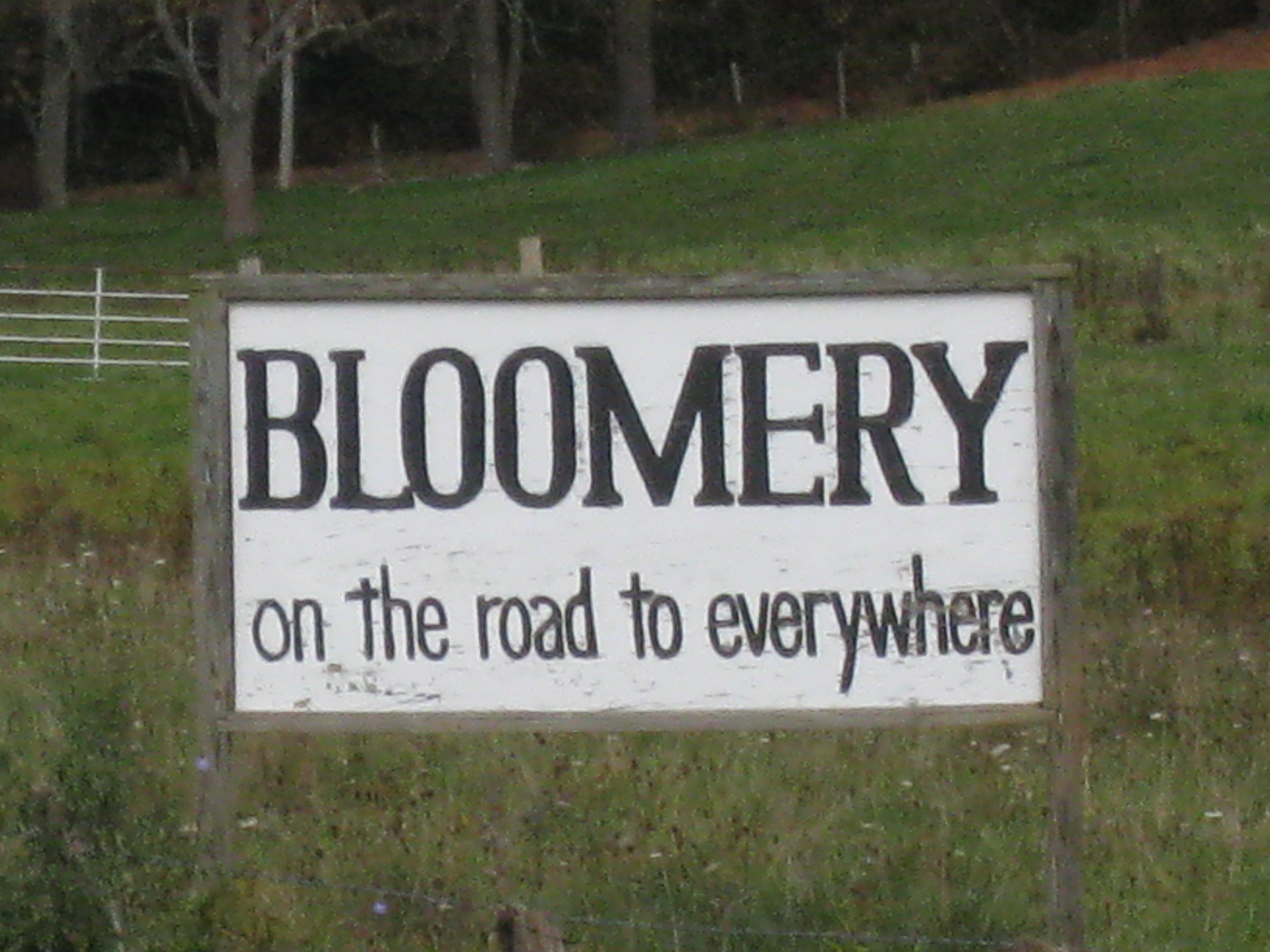
- The "Bloomery Sign"

- Location within Eastern Panhandle of West Virginia Location within West Virginia Location within the United States
- Coordinates: 39°23′13″N 78°22′23″W
- Country: United States
- State: West Virginia
- County: Hampshire
- Time zone: UTC-5 (Eastern (EST))
  - Summer (DST): UTC-4 (EDT)

Bloomery is an unincorporated community in Hampshire County in the U.S. state of West Virginia. Bloomery is northwest of Winchester, Virginia, along the Bloomery Pike (West Virginia Route 127). According to the 2000 census, the Bloomery had a population of 321.

Bloomery was named for its one-time importance as a center of bloomeries for iron smelting.

== Historic sites ==
With the exception of the past two decades, the majority of Bloomery's residences were constructed prior to the American Civil War.

- Bloomery Grist Mill (c. 1800), Bloomery Pike (WV Route 127)
- Bloomery Presbyterian Church (1825), Bloomery Pike (WV Route 127)
- Bloomery School, Sandy Hollow Road (County Route 45/1)
- Fawcett House ("The Old Stone House"), Bloomery Pike (WV Route 127)
- Hatch House, Smokey Hollow Road (County Route 6)
- Old Bloomery Iron Furance, Bloomery Pike (WV Route 127)
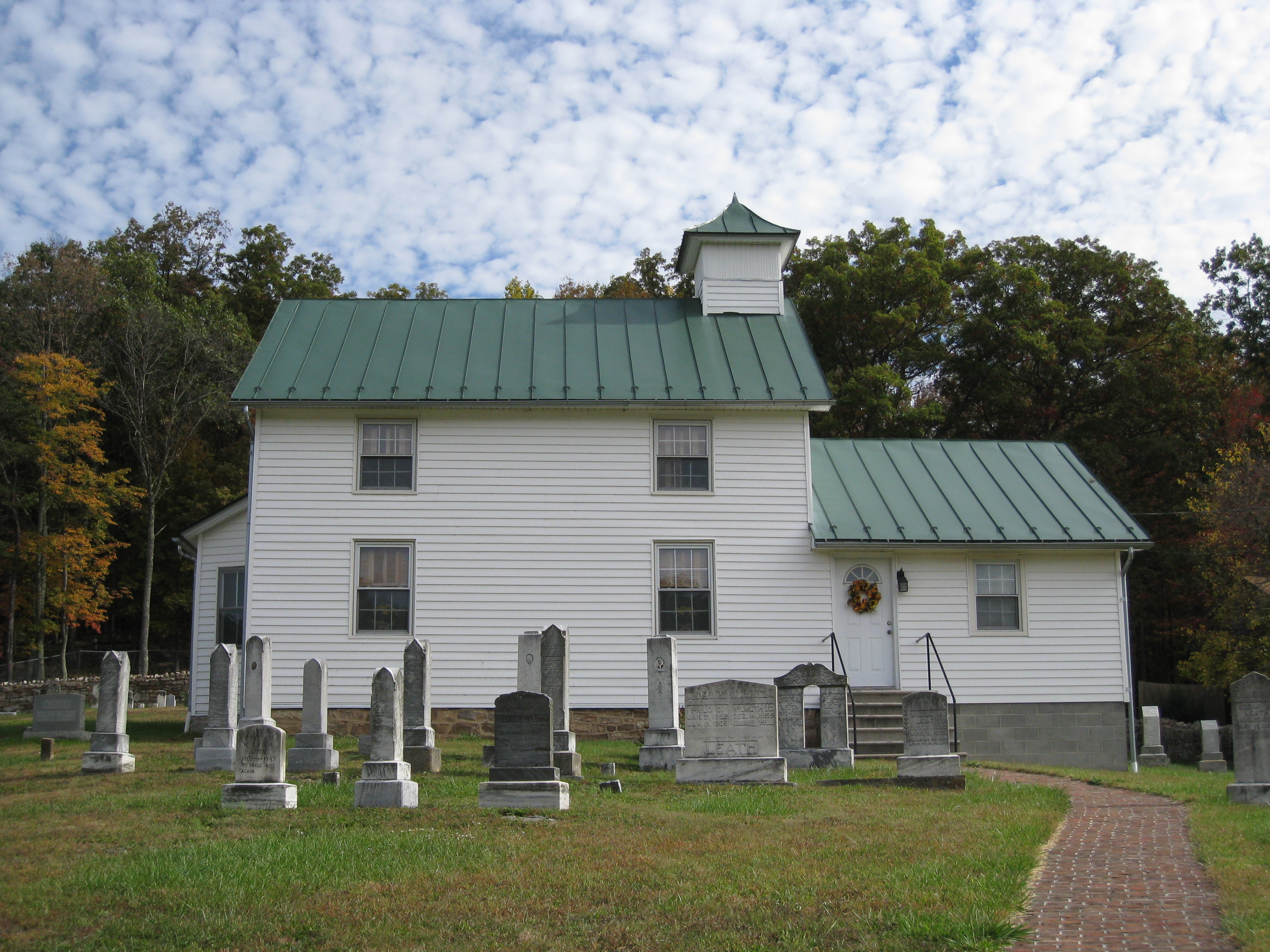
Bloomery Presbyterian Church

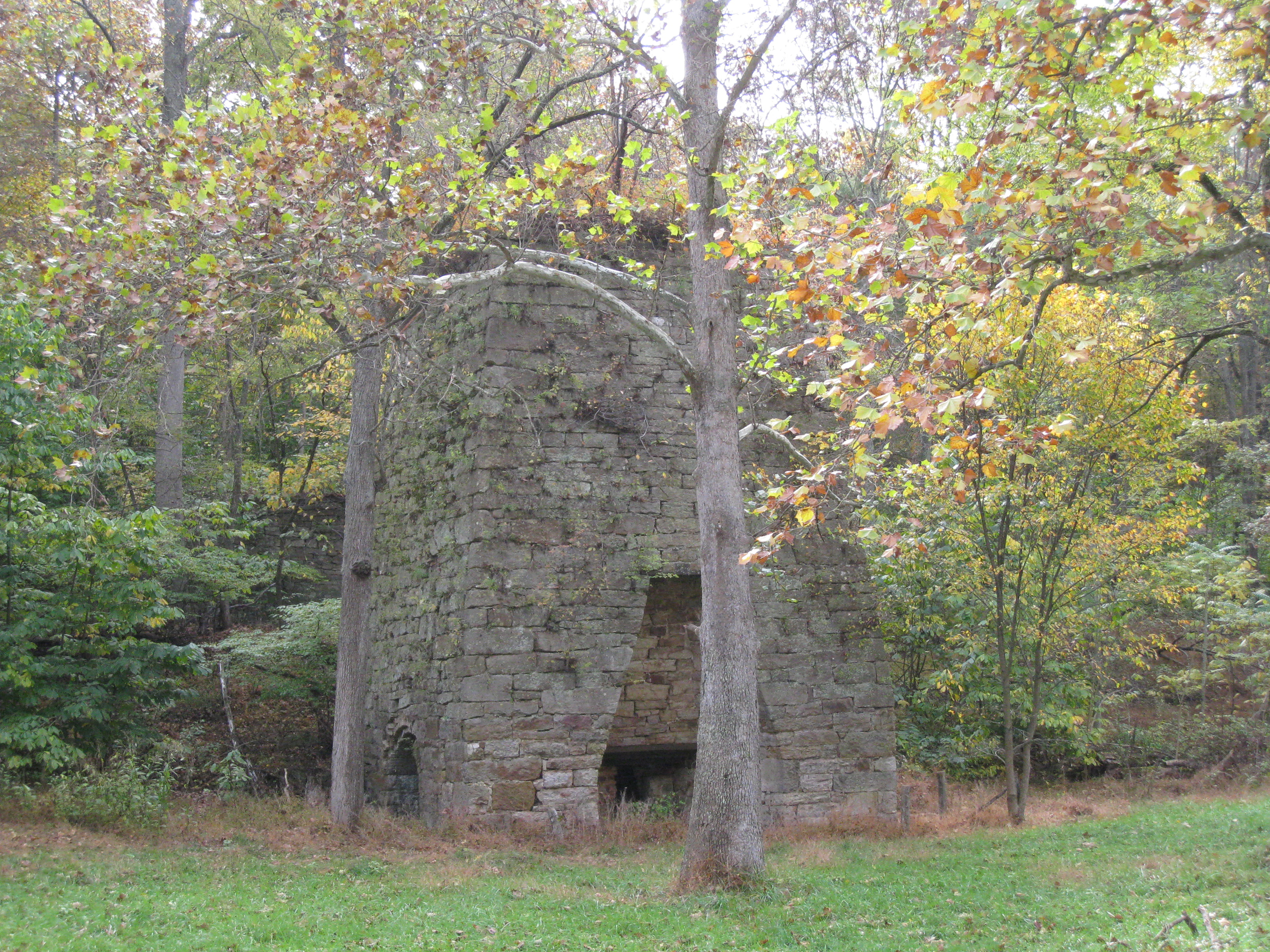
Bloomery Iron Furnace
