= Smith Crossroads, West Virginia =

Smith Crossroads
- Unincorporated community
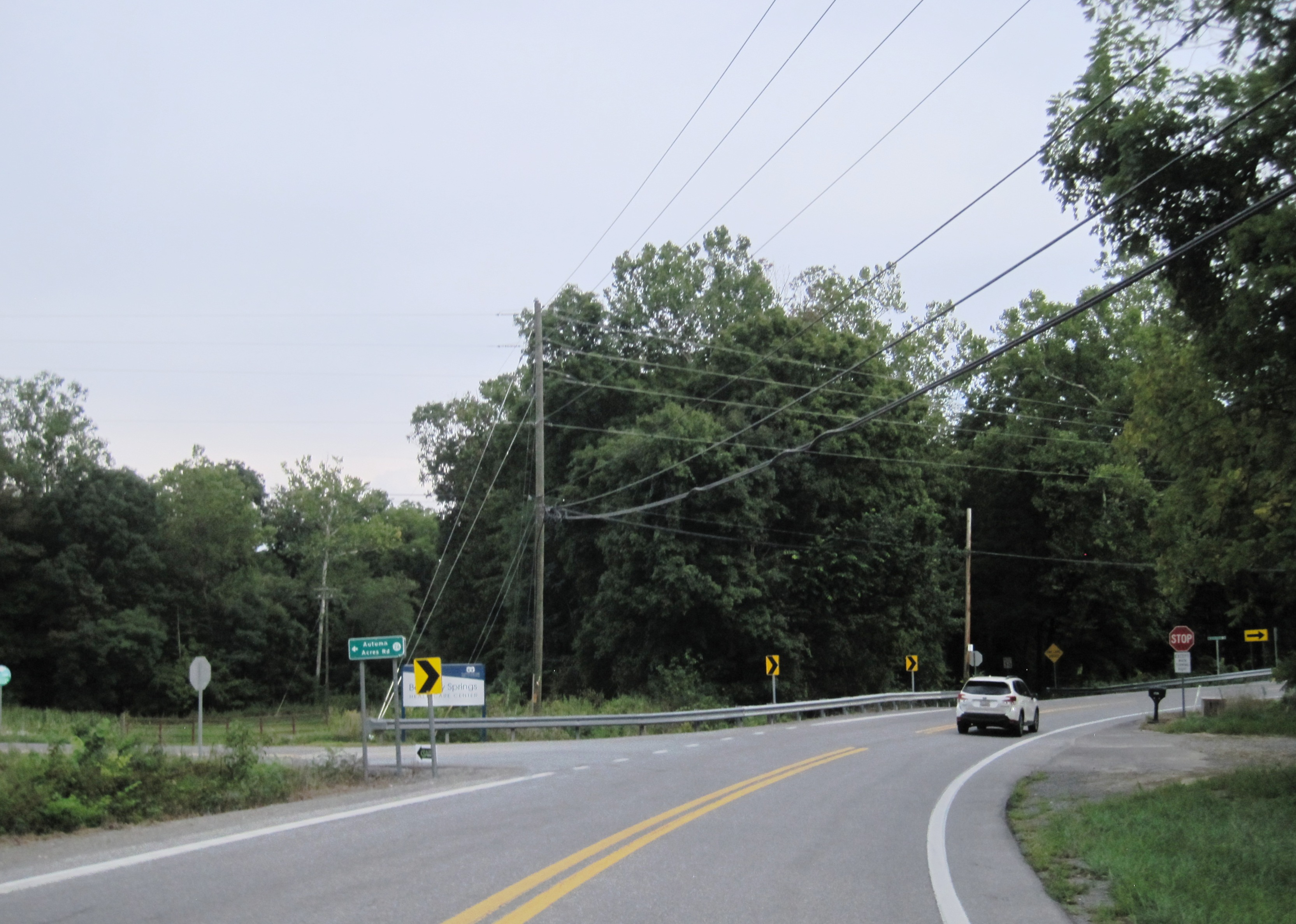

- Location within the state of West Virginia Smith Crossroads (the United States)
- Coordinates: 39°34′4″N 78°13′38″W
- Country: United States
- State: West Virginia
- County: Morgan
- Time zone: UTC-5 (Eastern (EST))
  - Summer (DST): UTC-4 (EDT)
- GNIS feature ID: 1549934

Smith Crossroads is an unincorporated community in Morgan County in the U.S. state of West Virginia's Eastern Panhandle. The hamlet lies at the crossroads of the Winchester Grade Road (County Route 13) with County Routes 26 and 13/1. According to the Geographic Names Information System, Smith Crossroads has also been referred to as Smiths Corners, Smiths Cross Roads, and Smiths Forks.
