= Sleepy Creek Wildlife Management Area =

State Wildlife Management Area in Berkeley and Morgan counties, West Virginia

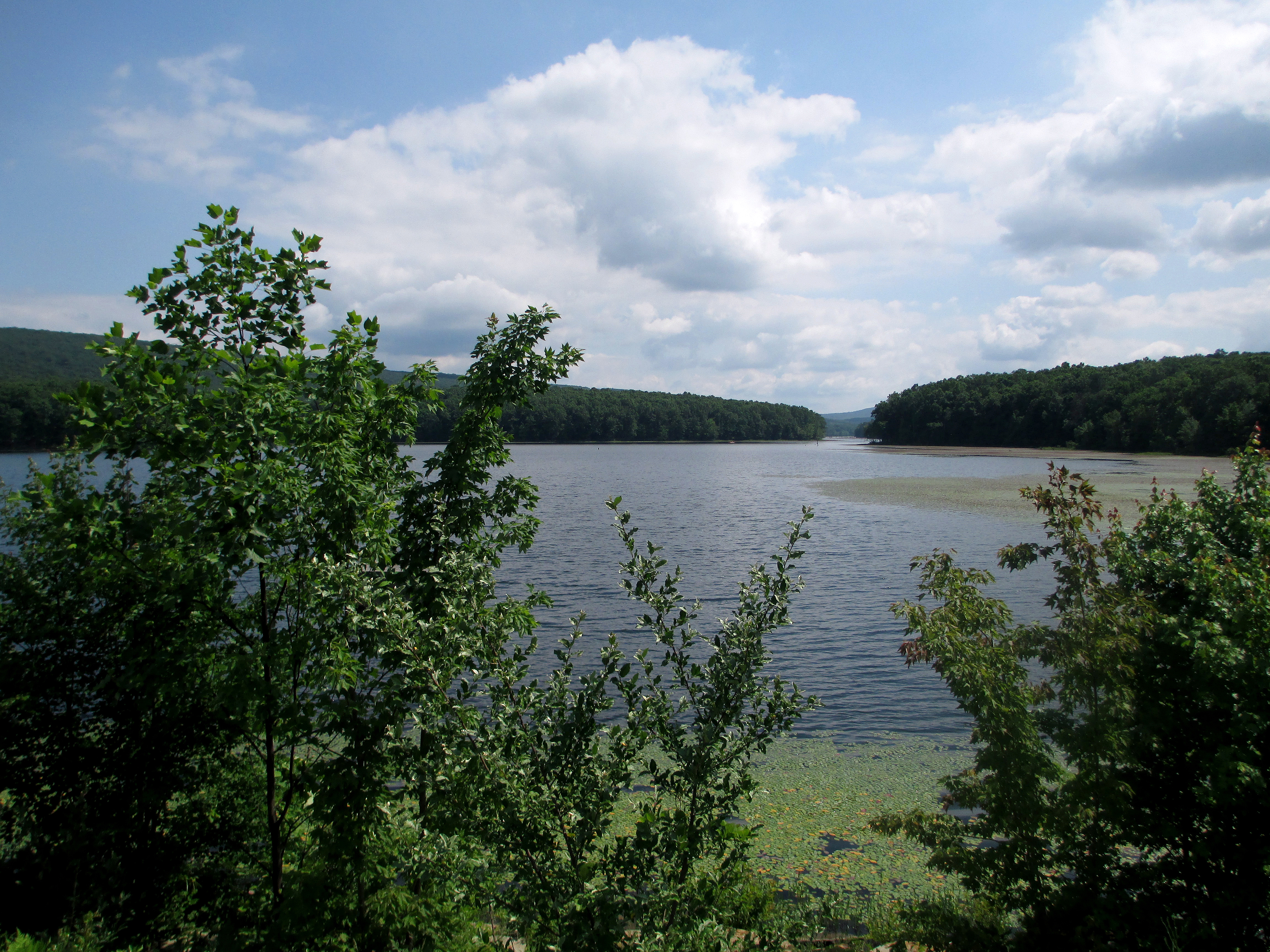
- Sleepy Creek Lake in Sleepy Creek WMA, looking south from the impoundment

- Location within West Virginia
- Location: Berkeley and Morgan, West Virginia, United States
- Coordinates: 39°29′35″N 78°07′57″W
- Area: 22,928 acres (92.79 km^{2})
- Elevation: 866 ft (264 m)
- Operator: Wildlife Resources Section, WV Division of Natural Resources

Sleepy Creek Wildlife Management Area is located in Morgan and Berkeley Counties in West Virginia's Eastern Panhandle. It encompasses 22,928 acres (92.79 km^{2}), mostly covered with mixed oak and pine forest, although about 3,500 acres (14 km^{2}) are covered with mixed hardwoods. The 205-acre (83 ha) Sleepy Creek Lake is located entirely within the WMA.

== Location ==
To access Sleepy Creek WMA from Berkeley Springs, follow U.S. Route 522 south to Winchester Grade Road and follow Winchester Grade Road 12 miles (19 km) to Shanghai Road. Follow east on Shanghai Road into the WMA.

From Martinsburg, follow WV Route 9 about nine miles (14 km) west to Back Creek Valley Road. From the intersection with WV Route 9, follow Back Creek Valley Road south about seven miles (11 km) to Sleepy Creek Road. Follow Sleepy Creek Road west into the WMA.

== Recreation ==
Hunting opportunities in Sleepy Creek WMA include white-tailed deer, ruffed grouse, eastern gray squirrel, and wild turkey. Trapping opportunities can include bobcat, red fox, and raccoon.

Fishing opportunities in the 205-acre (83 ha) Sleepy Creek Lake include largemouth bass, bluegill, crappie, and northern pike.

Seventy-five primitive camping sites are provided at the WMA. Trailers over 17 feet (5.2 m) feet long should not be brought into the WMA due to the narrow gravel access road.

== See also ==
- List of West Virginia wildlife management areas
