= Warm Spring Run =

River in West Virginia, US

Coordinates: 39.69537°N 78.172229°W

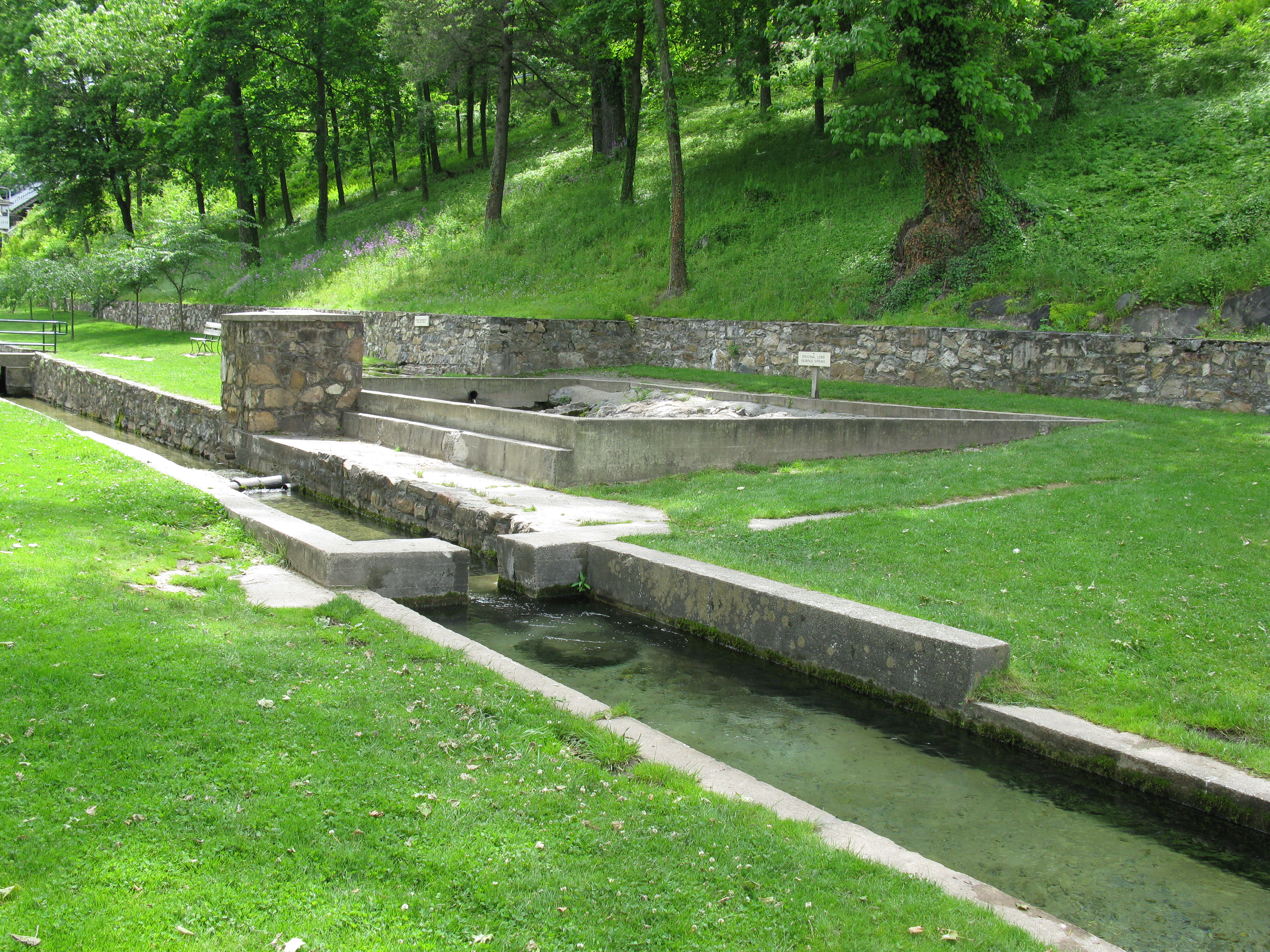
Warm Spring Run in Berkeley Springs State Park

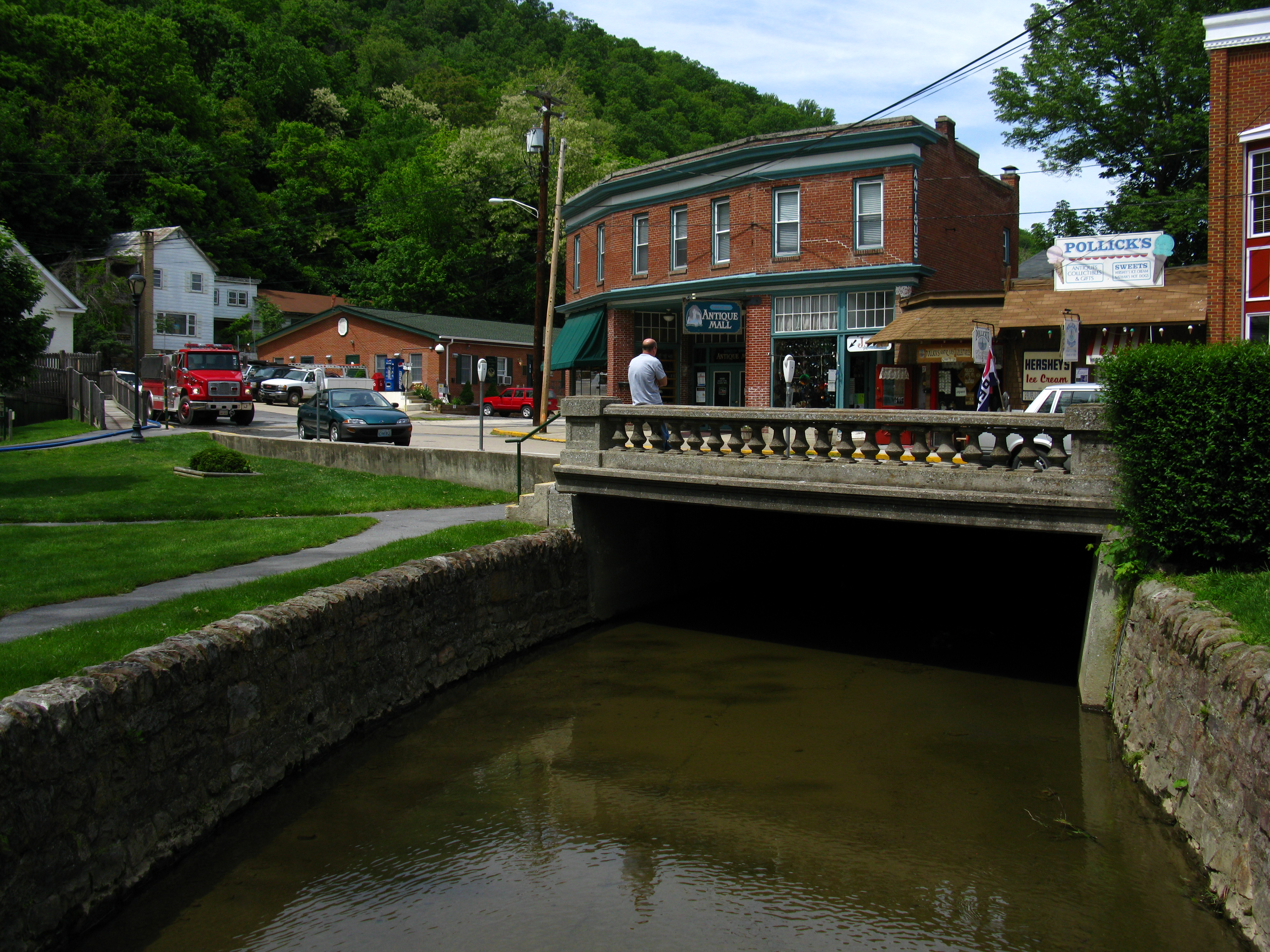
Warm Spring Run under Fairfax Street

Warm Spring Run is an 11.9-mile-long (19.2 km) non-navigable tributary stream of the Potomac River in Morgan County of West Virginia's Eastern Panhandle. It rises on the eastern side of Warm Springs Ridge (1,115 feet) and parallels U.S. Route 522 for most of its course. Warm Spring Run enters the Potomac River at Hancock. Warm Spring Run is primarily fed by springs on Warm Springs Ridge, the best-known of these being the springs at Berkeley Springs State Park in Berkeley Springs through which it flows.

== Tributaries ==
- Dry Run

== List of cities and towns along Warm Spring Run ==
- Berkeley Springs
- Berryville
- Burnt Factory
- Hancock
- Jimtown
- North Berkeley

== See also ==
- List of rivers of West Virginia
