= Cumberland Subdivision =

Railroad line in the U.S. states of West Virginia and Maryland

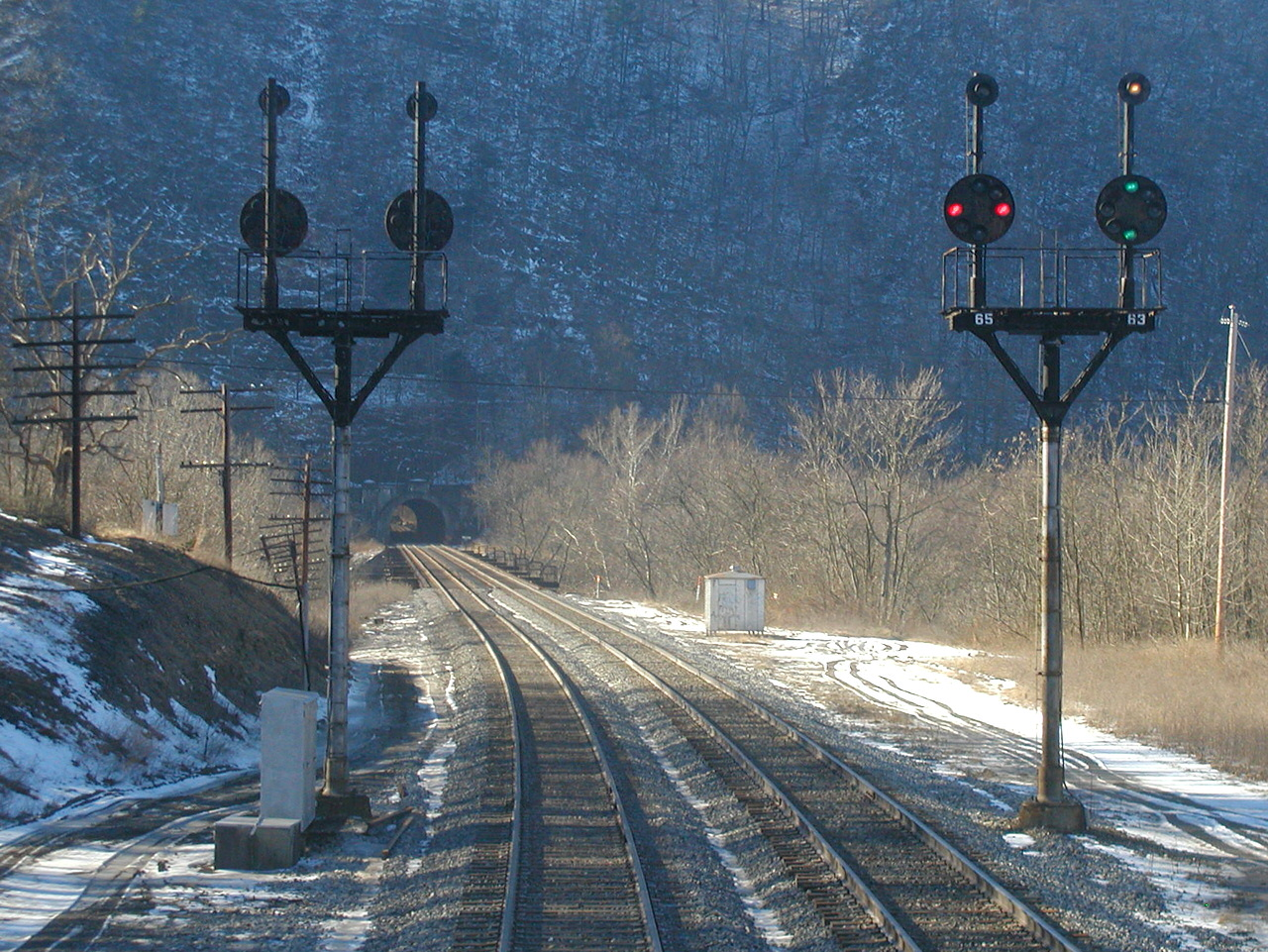
- Cumberland Subdivision on the Magnolia Cutoff in Magnolia, West Virginia, facing west towards Cumberland. Magnolia Bridge and Graham Tunnel in background.

Overview
- Status: Active
- Owner: CSX Transportation
- Locale: West Virginia, Maryland
- Termini: Cumberland; Harpers Ferry

Service
- Type: Freight rail
- System: CSX Transportation
- Operator: CSX Transportation

Technical
- Number of tracks: 2
- Track gauge: 4 ft 8 1/2 in (1,435 mm) standard gauge
Route map
Cumberland Subdivision

The CSX Cumberland Subdivision is a railroad line owned and operated by CSX Transportation (CSX) in the U.S. states of Maryland and West Virginia. The line runs from Brunswick, Maryland, west to Cumberland, Maryland, along the old Baltimore & Ohio Rail Road (B&O) main line. At its east end, the Cumberland Subdivision becomes the Metropolitan Subdivision; at its west end at Cumberland, Maryland it becomes the Cumberland Terminal Subdivision. It meets the Shenandoah Subdivision at Harpers Ferry, West Virginia, and the Lurgan Subdivision in Cherry Run, West Virginia.

== History ==
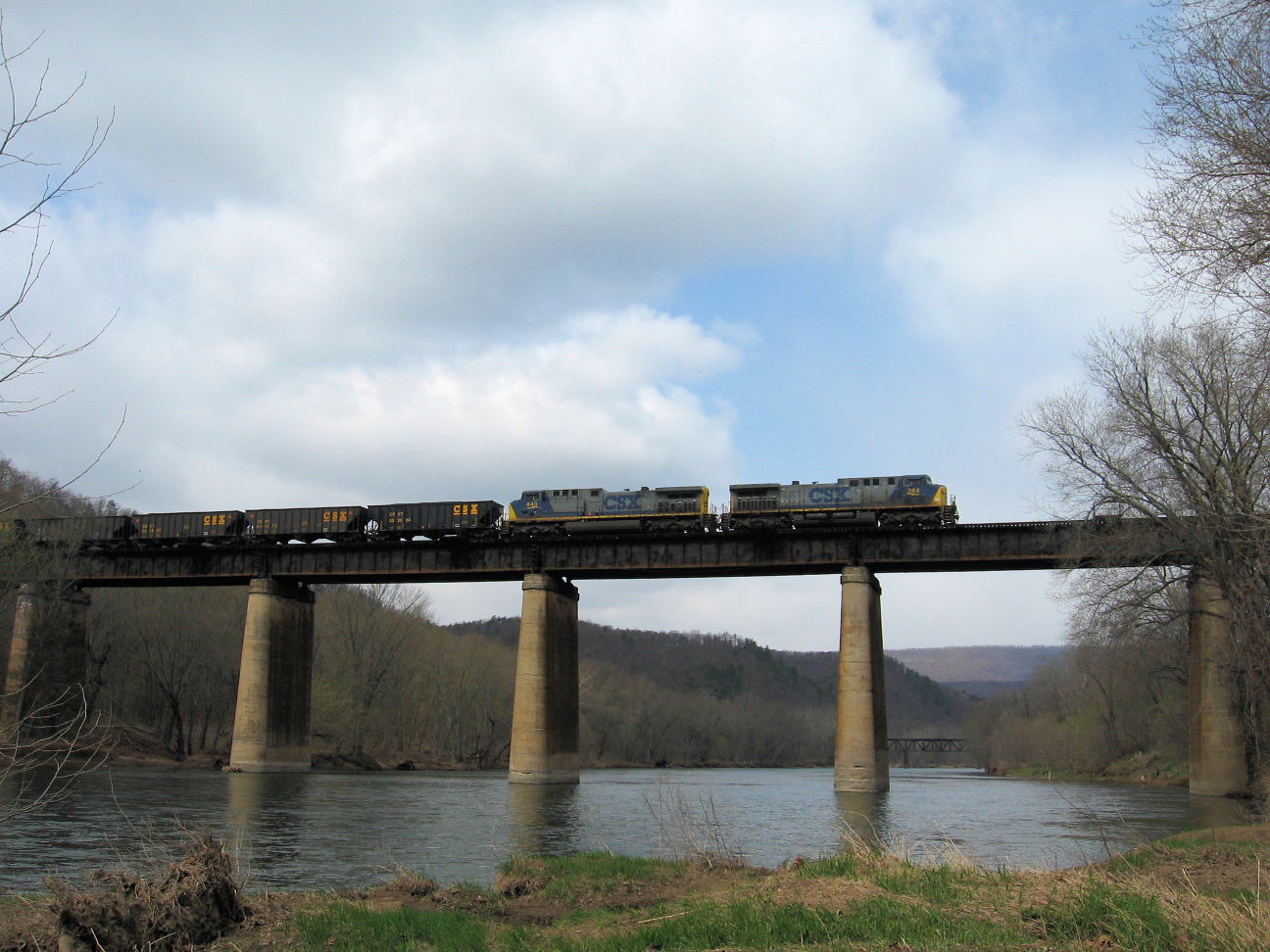
Magnolia Bridge over the Potomac River

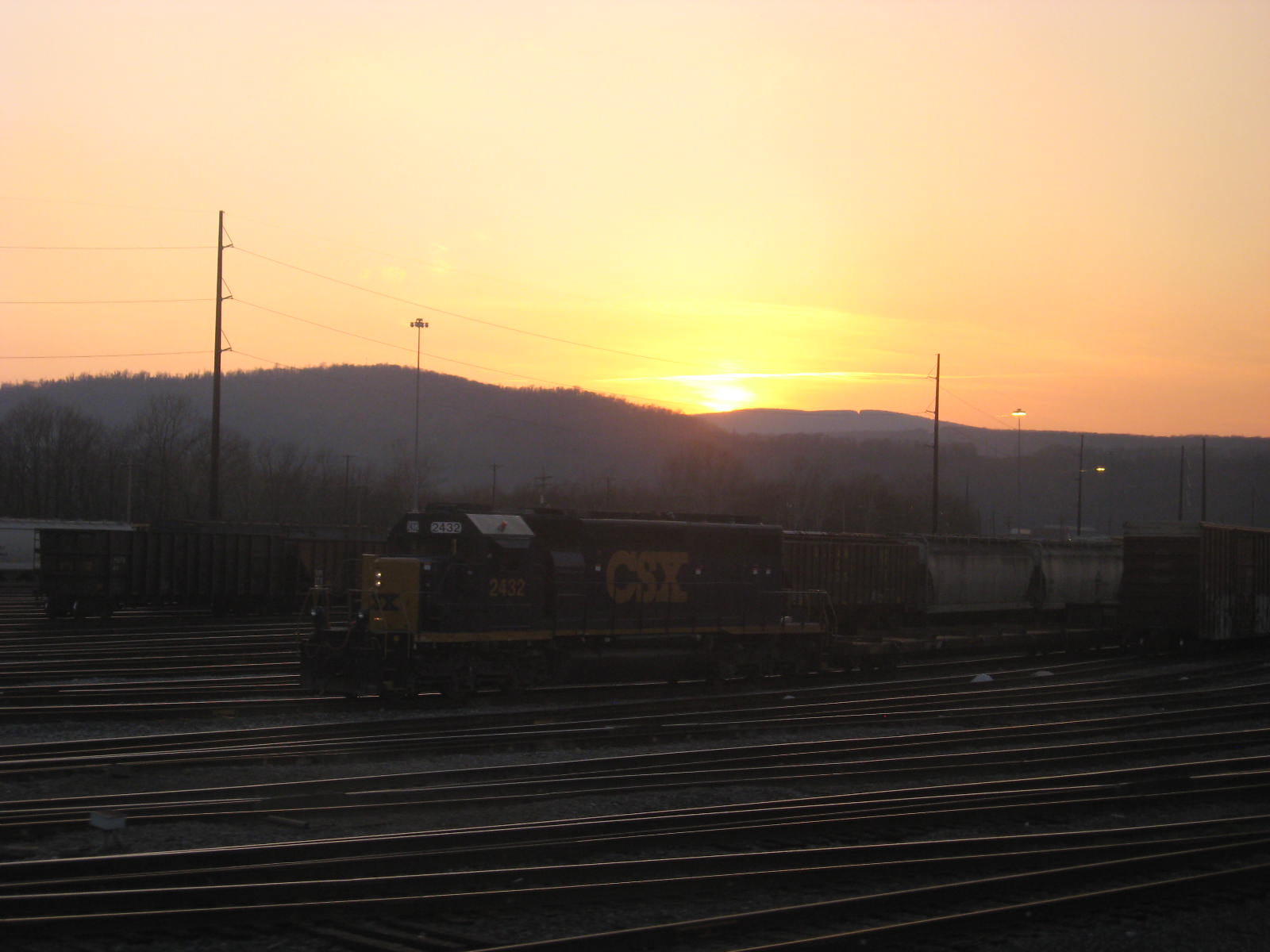
CSX Locomotive waiting in the Cumberland Subdivision Yard

The Cumberland Subdivision was opened in 1842 as part of B&O's main line. In 1914 B&O opened the Magnolia Cutoff, a more direct route through mountain ridges, running 14 miles (23 km) between Hansrote, West Virginia and Paw Paw, West Virginia. The project included construction of four tunnels, two bridges, and many deep rock cuts. B&O continued to use the original route along the Potomac River, called the "Lowline," until 1961.

In 1987, CSX absorbed the subdivision and the rest of the B&O system.

== Current operation ==
The Cumberland Subdivision carries freight and passenger rail traffic, with frequent intermodal, autorack, coal unit, mixed freight, and oil trains, plus Amtrak's Floridian in both directions. MARC Brunswick Line regional passenger trains stop at Martinsburg, Duffields, and Harpers Ferry in West Virginia, then continue east through Maryland to Washington Union Station.

== See also ==
- List of CSX Transportation lines
