= Green Ridge (disambiguation) =

Green Ridge may refer to:

- Green Ridge, Arkansas
- Green Ridge, Missouri
- Green Ridge, West Virginia
- Green Ridge, a district of Scranton, Pennsylvania

== See also ==
- Greenridge, Staten Island
