= Crossroads, West Virginia =

Crossroads, West Virginia may refer to:

- Crossroads, Monongalia County, West Virginia

== See also ==
- Orleans Cross Roads, West Virginia
- Stotlers Crossroads, West Virginia
- Spohrs Crossroads, West Virginia
- Smith Crossroads, West Virginia
- Johnson Crossroads, West Virginia
