= Green Ridge, West Virginia =

Green Ridge
- Unincorporated community
- Location within the state of West Virginia Green Ridge (the United States)
- Coordinates: 39°35′13″N 78°26′20″W
- Country: United States
- State: West Virginia
- County: Morgan
- Time zone: UTC-5 (Eastern (EST))
  - Summer (DST): UTC-4 (EDT)

Green Ridge is a now uninhabited railroad community in Morgan County in the U.S. state of West Virginia on the old Baltimore and Ohio Railroad mainline where the Western Maryland Railroad crosses the Potomac River from the Stickpile Tunnel in Maryland. Green Ridge was originally known as Baird and was an operating station on the B&O. Today, it is located within the Chesapeake and Ohio Canal National Historical Park. A stretch of the Western Maryland's right-of-way from Green Ridge to Jerome is listed on the National Register of Historic Places. (See Western Maryland Railroad Right-of-Way, Milepost 126 to Milepost 160.)

Green Ridge is accessible by way of Baird Lane (West Virginia Secondary Route 12/3) from Hansrote Road (West Virginia Secondary Route 12/2) at Hansrote. It can also be reached by a number of residential roads in the Nixon Tracts development on Magnolia Ridge from Magnolia to the south. While uninhabited, the site is popular with railfans.
