= Farnham Colossi =

Private outdoor collection of giant fiberglass figures in West Virginia

Coordinates: 39.4190°N 78.2594°W

Farnham Colossi (also known as Farnham's Fantasy Farm) is a privately owned outdoor collection of oversized fiberglass advertising figures and other roadside statuary in the unincorporated community of Unger in Morgan County, West Virginia. Begun in the early 2000s by residents George and Pam Farnham, the site includes multiple Muffler Men, a Uniroyal Gal, a “Big John” grocer, and other large figures arranged across their rural property.

The collection has been cited by popular press and travel media as a contemporary roadside attraction, and elements of the site have been featured in lists of notable Americana. Art-environment organizations have documented the location as part of a broader movement of vernacular and visionary environments in the United States.

== History ==
George Farnham, a former Washington, D.C., attorney, began acquiring decommissioned fiberglass figures through auctions and private sales after moving to rural West Virginia in the 1980s. By the 2000s the couple had assembled a diverse group of figures, many of which were originally used as commercial signage along U.S. highways in the mid-20th century. The property informally became known as “Farnham’s Fantasy Farm,” and later as the “Farnham Colossi.”

== Description ==
The site comprises dozens of large fiberglass figures positioned around the Farnhams’ residence and outbuildings along Winchester Grade Road. Reported examples include two Muffler Men (male figures once used by auto shops), a Uniroyal Gal (a female figure associated with tire promotions), a “Big John” grocer, and miscellaneous animals and novelty pieces. The arrangement is informal and has changed over time as pieces are acquired or relocated.

== Reception and documentation ==
Travel and culture publications have profiled the collection as an example of the persistence of roadside Americana in rural Appalachia. In 2010, Time highlighted the site within a special package on American experiences. The location has also been noted by preservation-oriented organizations that document vernacular art environments.

== See also ==
- Roadside attraction
- Folk art and Visionary environments
