= Rock Gap, West Virginia =

- Unincorporated community
- Location within the State of West Virginia Rock Gap, West Virginia (the United States)
- Coordinates: 39°31′59″N 78°16′35″W
- Country: United States
- State: West Virginia
- County: Morgan
- Time zone: UTC-5 (Eastern (EST))
  - Summer (DST): UTC-4 (EDT)
- GNIS feature ID: 1545910

Rock Gap is an unincorporated community along Valley Road (U.S. Highway 522) in Morgan County, West Virginia, United States. It is located between Omps to its south and Berkeley Springs to its north. Situated between Warm Springs Ridge (1,086 feet) to its west and Timber Ridge (1,355 feet) to its east, Rock Gap takes its name from the "Rock Gap" in Warm Spring Ridge, carved out by Rock Gap Run, a tributary stream of Sleepy Creek.
