= Oakland, West Virginia =

Oakland
- Unincorporated community
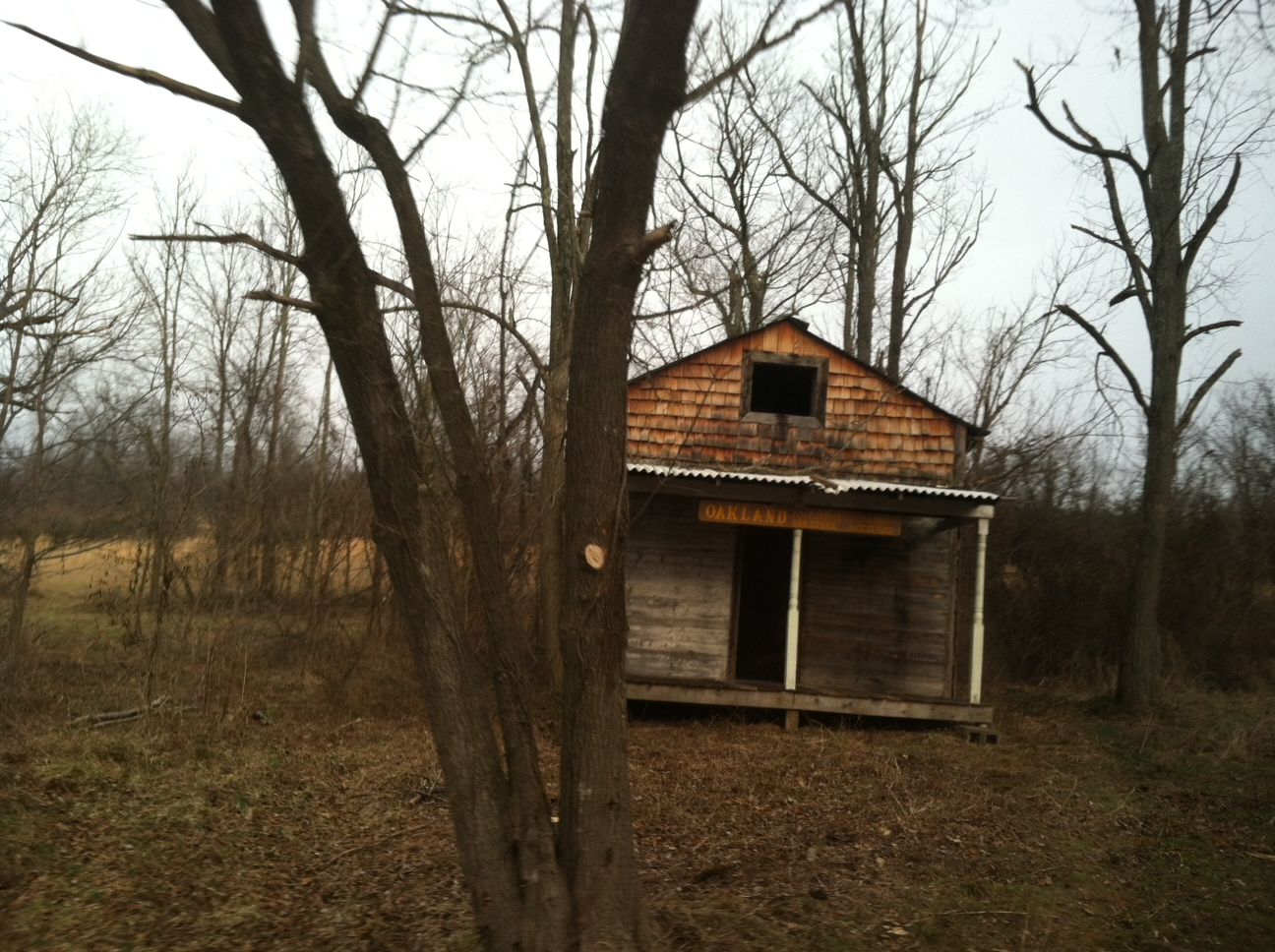
- The former Oakland post office and general store at the corner of Virginia Line Road and Sticky Kline Road.

- Location within the state of West Virginia Oakland (the United States)
- Coordinates: 39°28′52″N 78°15′6″W
- Country: United States
- State: West Virginia
- County: Morgan
- Time zone: UTC-5 (Eastern (EST))
  - Summer (DST): UTC-4 (EDT)
- GNIS feature ID: 1549859

Oakland is an unincorporated community in Morgan County, West Virginia. It is located along Virginia Line Road (County Route 8) north of Unger and south of Stotlers Crossroads. Oakland is connected to Valley Road (U.S. Highway 522) by County Route 28 (Oakland and Morton Grove Roads).
