= 1919 Morgan County, West Virginia riot =

Coordinates: 39.6928°N 78.1775°W

Morgan County, West Virginia riot of 1919
- Part of Red Summer
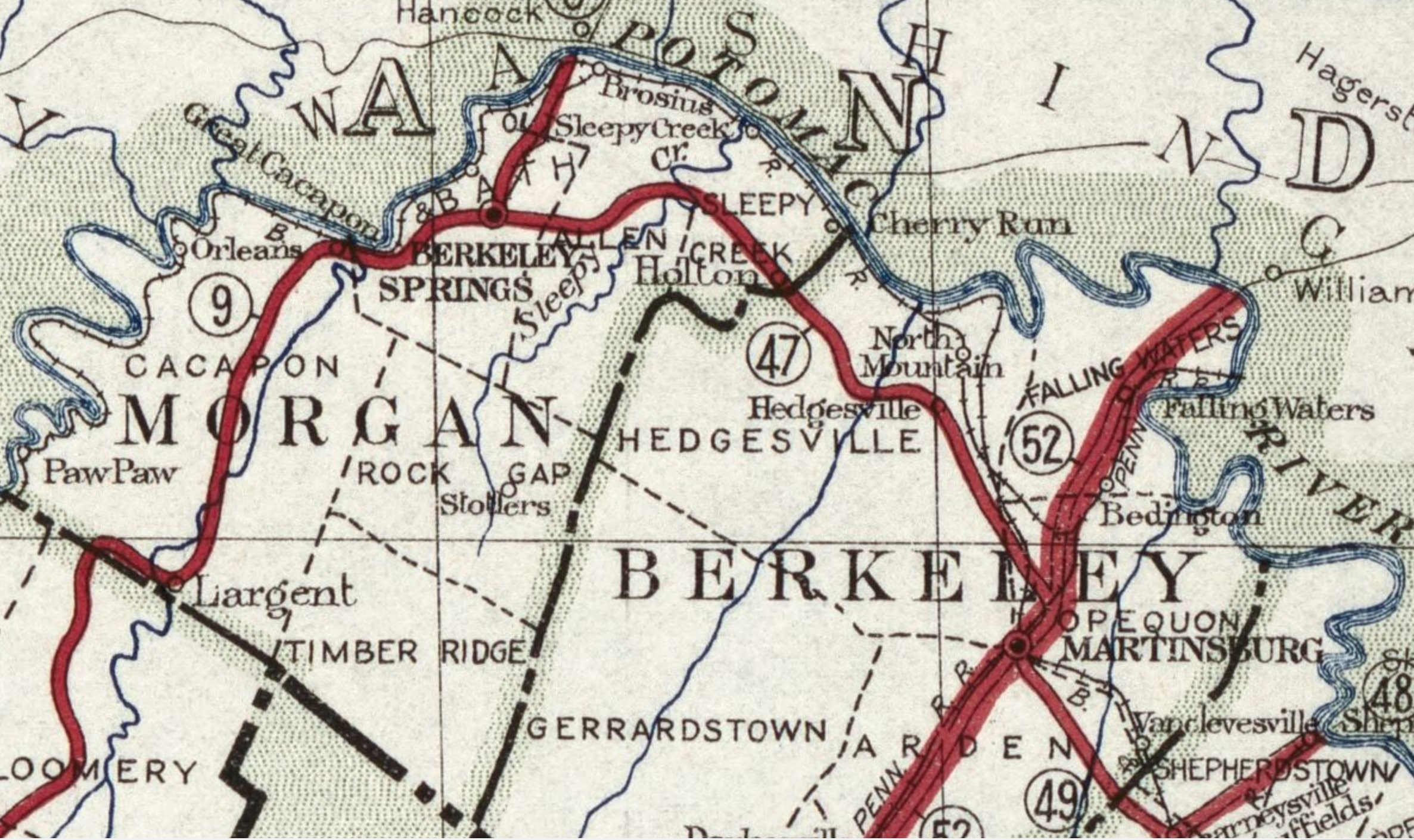
- Sheriff Hovermale fled with Ferguson from Hancock to Berkeley Springs then to Martinsburg, West Virginia
- Date: April 10, 1919
- Location: Morgan County, West Virginia
- Injuries: Dozens wounded

The Morgan County, West Virginia race riot of 1919 was caused by big business using African-American strikebreakers against striking white workers in Morgan County, West Virginia.

== Racial incident ==
On the same day of the riots, Hugh Ferguson, black man, was accused of raping Mrs. Ernest Zimmerman at her home near Brosius, Morgan County (now known as Hancock, West Virginia). An angry mob of several hundred men formed around the jail hoping to lynch Ferguson. Sheriff C. R. Hovermale was forced to flee with Ferguson to Berkeley Springs. When the lynching mob followed them they were again forced to flee to the county seat of Berkeley County, West Virginia, Martinsburg.

On June 25, 1919, Ferguson was convicted of rape and sentenced to death. He was identified by Mrs. Zimmerman at the trial. Ferguson maintained his innocence at his trial, but made a full confession to the prison warden and a chaplain a month later. He was lawfully executed by hanging at the West Virginia Penitentiary on August 6, 1919, shortly after making a second confession. In September 1919, seven men were indicted for the attempted lynching of Ferguson. It is unclear whether any of them were convicted.

== Aftermath ==
This uprising was one of several incidents of civil unrest that began in the so-called American Red Summer, of 1919. Terrorist attacks on black communities and white oppression in over three dozen cities and counties. In most cases, white mobs attacked African American neighborhoods. In some cases, black community groups resisted the attacks, especially in Chicago and Washington DC. Most deaths occurred in rural areas during events like the Elaine massacre in Arkansas, where an estimated 100 to 240 black people and 5 white people were killed. Also in 1919 were the Chicago Race Riot and Washington D.C. race riot which killed 38 and 39 people respectively, and with both having many more non-fatal injuries and extensive property damage reaching up into the millions of dollars.

== See also ==
- Capital punishment in West Virginia
- List of people executed in West Virginia
- List of people executed in the United States in 1919
- List of incidents of civil unrest in the United States
- Mass racial violence in the United States
- Washington race riot of 1919

== Bibliography ==
Notes

References

- Marcelle, Dale (2016). Pitchforks and Negro Babies: America's Shocking History of Hate. AuthorHouse. ISBN 9781524625764. - Total pages: 328
- The New York Times (October 5, 1919). "For Action on Race Riot Peril". The New York Times. New York, NY. ISSN 1553-8095. OCLC 1645522.
- The Wheeling Intelligencer (April 10, 1919). "Negro Nearly Lynched After Brutal Attack". The Intelligencer and Wheeling News Register. Wheeling, West Virginia. OCLC 13502337.
