= Ridgeley Sandstone =

Geologic formation in the United States

- Stratigraphic range: Pragian
- Type: Sedimentary

Location
- Region: Appalachian Mountains
- Country: United States
- Extent: Maryland, Ohio, Pennsylvania, Virginia, and West Virginia

The Ridgeley sandstone is a sandstone or quartzite of Devonian age found in the Appalachian Mountains of Pennsylvania, Maryland, West Virginia, and Virginia, United States. The Ridgeley is fine-grained, siliceous, calcareous in its lower strata, sometimes fossiliferous, and sometimes locally pebbly or conglomeritic. Varying in thickness from 12 to 500 feet (4–150 m), this rock slowly erodes into white quartz sand that often washes or blows away, but sometimes accumulates at large outcrops. When freshly broken, the rock is white, but outcrop surfaces are often stained yellowish by iron oxides.

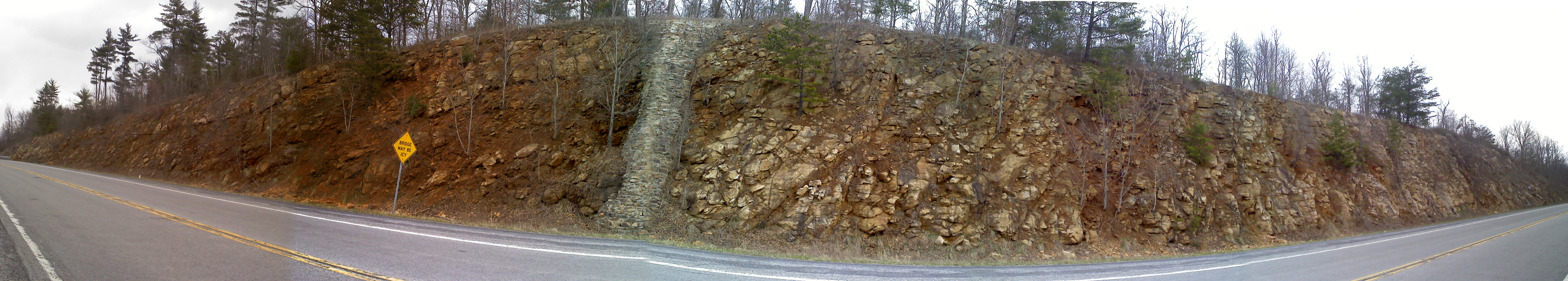
Panorama of a roadcut through the Ridgeley sandstone along U.S. Route 522 north of Shirleysburg, Huntingdon County, Pennsylvania, April 2011

The Ridgeley Sandstone was described and named in 1913 from an outcrop in Ridgeley, West Virginia, across the North Branch of the Potomac River from Cumberland, Maryland. The type locality was designated at the town of Ridgely (spelling later changed to Ridgeley) in Mineral County, West Virginia. During the early 20th century, there was some dispute about relation between the Ridgeley Sandstone and the Oriskany Sandstone (named after a locality in New York) and the Monterey Sandstone (named after a locality in Virginia). This dispute was resolved by Butts (1940), who stated that the Oriskany Sandstone "corresponds exactly with the Ridgley Sandstone," that the Oriskany Sandstone is the same as the Monterey Sandstone of Virginia, and that the rules of stratigraphic nomenclature dictate that the name Oriskany Sandstone should be applied to these strata.

Outcrops of the erosion-resistant, ridge-forming Ridgeley ("Oriskany") sandstone are conspicuous landscape features in the Ridge and Valley physiographic province from south-central Pennsylvania through western Maryland and eastern West Virginia to Craig County in western Virginia. Ridgely outcrops form part of the lateral structures of North Fork Mountain, New Creek Mountain, and Wills Mountain of the Wills Mountain Anticline, although it is the even more erosion-resistant Silurian-aged Tuscarora Quartzite, not the Ridgely sandstone, that caps most parts of the prominent central ridge of this long geological structure. Other conspicuous Ridgeley outcrops include Caudy's Castle (Castle Rock) and Ice Mountain, both in Hampshire County, West Virginia.

At Berkeley Springs, West Virginia, warm water flows from natural mineral springs in the Ridgeley sandstone of Warm Springs Ridge; spa facilities (now in Berkeley Springs State Park) have long used these waters.

The Ridgeley sandstone is sometimes quarried and crushed to produce quartz sand for glass-making; one such quarry is near Berkeley Springs.
