= Hansrote, West Virginia =

Hansrote
- unincorporated community
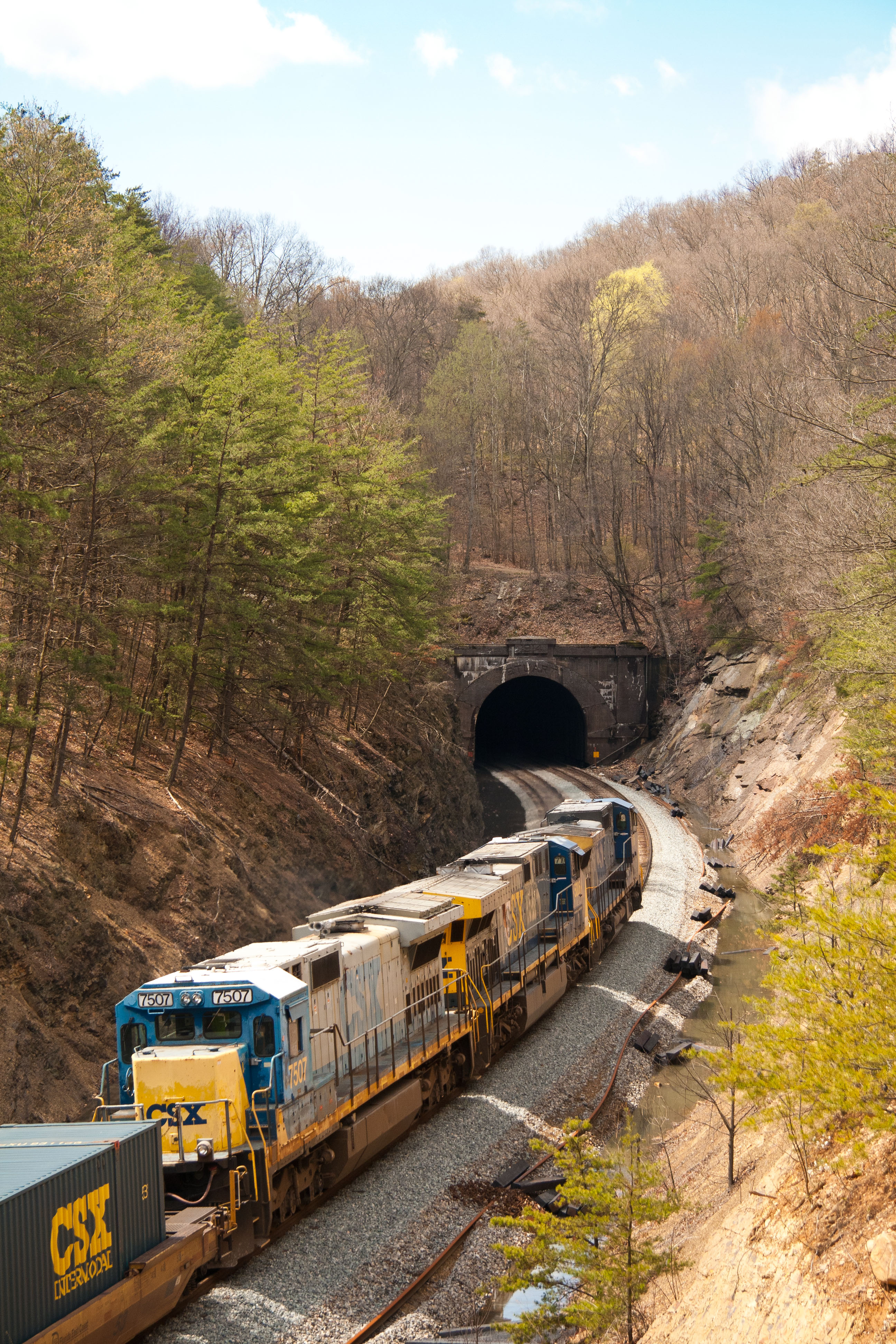
- Stuart Tunnel in Hansrote

- Location within the state of West Virginia Hansrote (the United States)
- Coordinates: 39°34′36″N 78°24′57″W
- Country: United States
- State: West Virginia
- County: Morgan
- Time zone: UTC-5 (Eastern (EST))
  - Summer (DST): UTC-4 (EDT)
- GNIS feature ID: 1554643

Hansrote is an unincorporated community village in Morgan County in the U.S. state of West Virginia located along the old Baltimore and Ohio Railroad (B&O) mainline on the Potomac River. Hansrote is northeast of Magnolia and southwest of Doe Gully. Stuart Tunnel connected Hansrote and Magnolia by railroad, but today Hansrote is accessible by way of Hansrote Road (West Virginia Secondary Route 12/2) from Magnolia Road (West Virginia Secondary Route 12). The former B&O mainline is now part of CSX Transportation and is a popular location with railfans.

== See also ==
- Shenandoah (B&O train)
- Washingtonian (B&O train)
