= Cherry Run, West Virginia =

Unincorporated community in West Virginia, United States

Cherry Run
- Unincorporated community
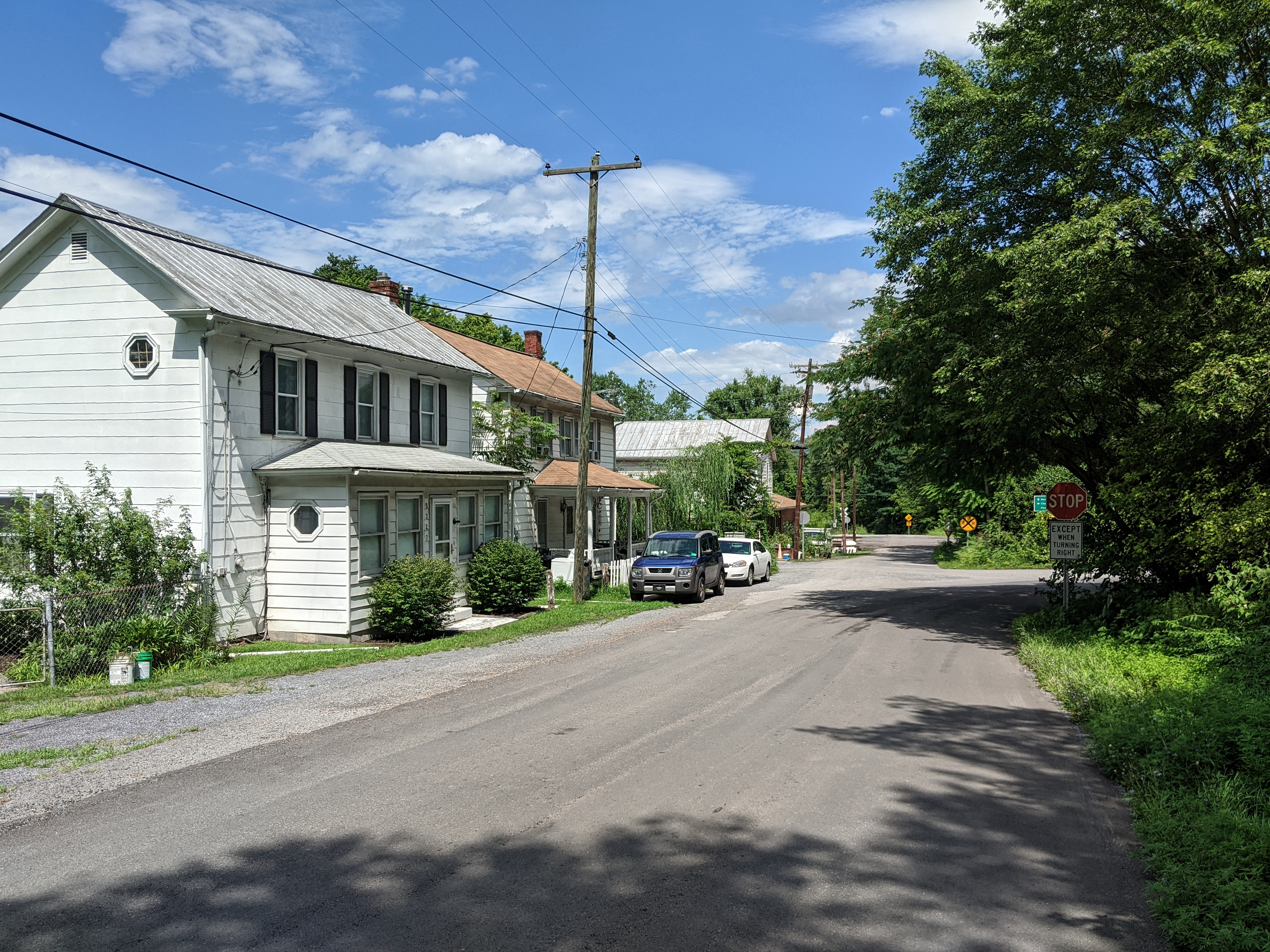
- Householder Road in Cherry Run

- Location within the state of West Virginia Cherry Run (the United States)
- Coordinates: 39°37′39″N 78°2′2″W
- Country: United States
- State: West Virginia
- County: Morgan
- Time zone: UTC-5 (Eastern (EST))
  - Summer (DST): UTC-4 (EDT)

Cherry Run is a small unincorporated community hamlet located along the CSX Transportation (formerly Baltimore and Ohio Railroad) mainline on the Potomac River in Morgan County in the U.S. state of West Virginia. The community is named for the stream, Cherry Run, that meets the Potomac in its vicinity. It was originally known as Cherry Run Depot because of the important interchange between the B&O and the Western Maryland Railway located there.

The last remnant of the interchange was Miller Tower, an interlocking tower controlling the junction. The tower was closed in September 2000, disassembled, and moved to the Martinsburg Shops site in February 2001. It was eventually reassembled there in November 2005.

Across the Potomac from Cherry Run lies Big Pool on the Chesapeake and Ohio Canal.

Cherry Run is reached by Householder Road (Morgan County Route 10) from the west and both Cherry Run Road (County Route 5) and Fulton Road (County Route 1/5) from Martinsburg Road (West Virginia Route 9) to the south. On the B&O mainline, Cherry Run is located between Hancock to its west and Little Georgetown in Berkeley County to its east.

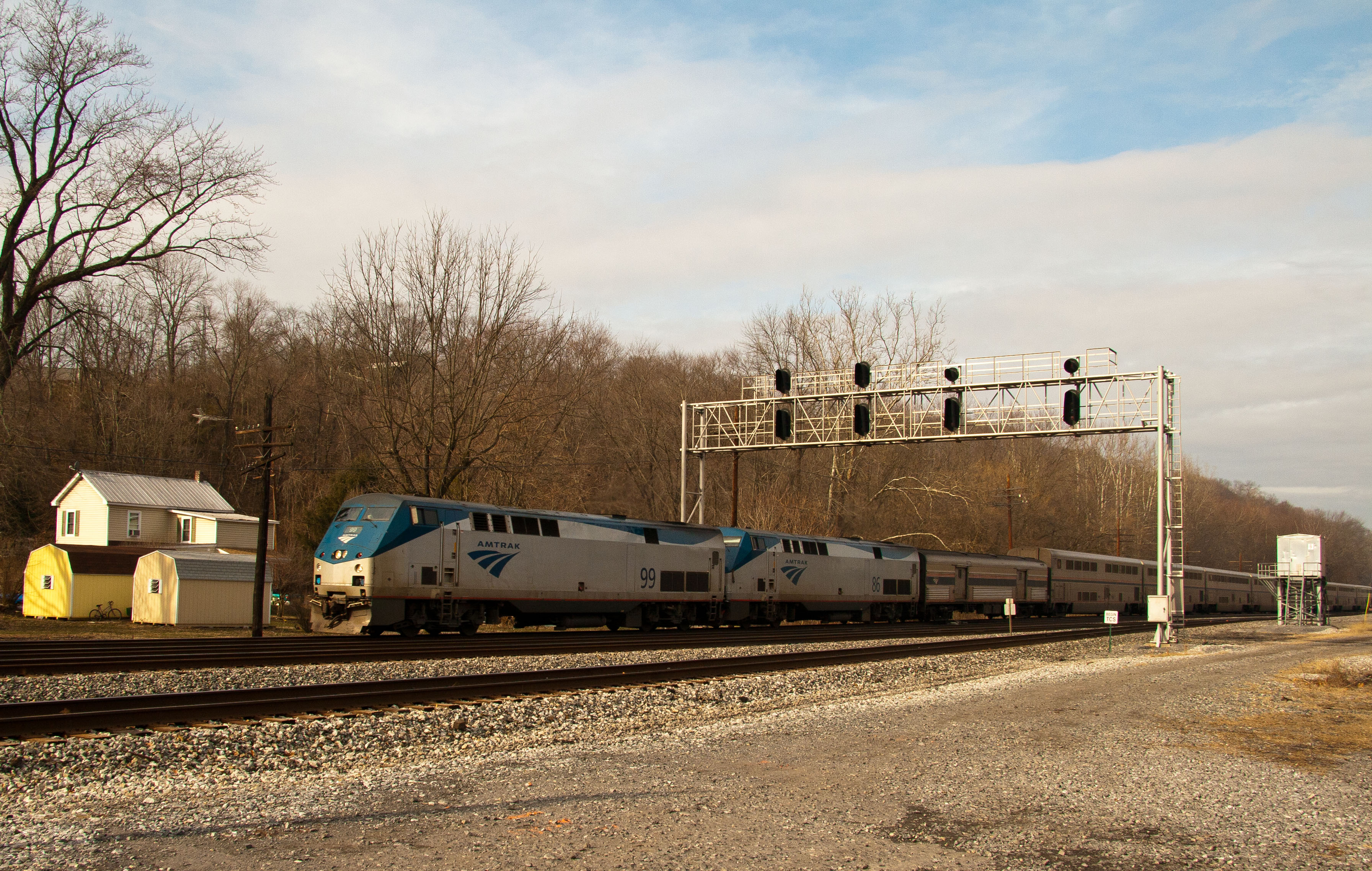
Amtrak's Capitol Limited speeds through Cherry Run in 2010.

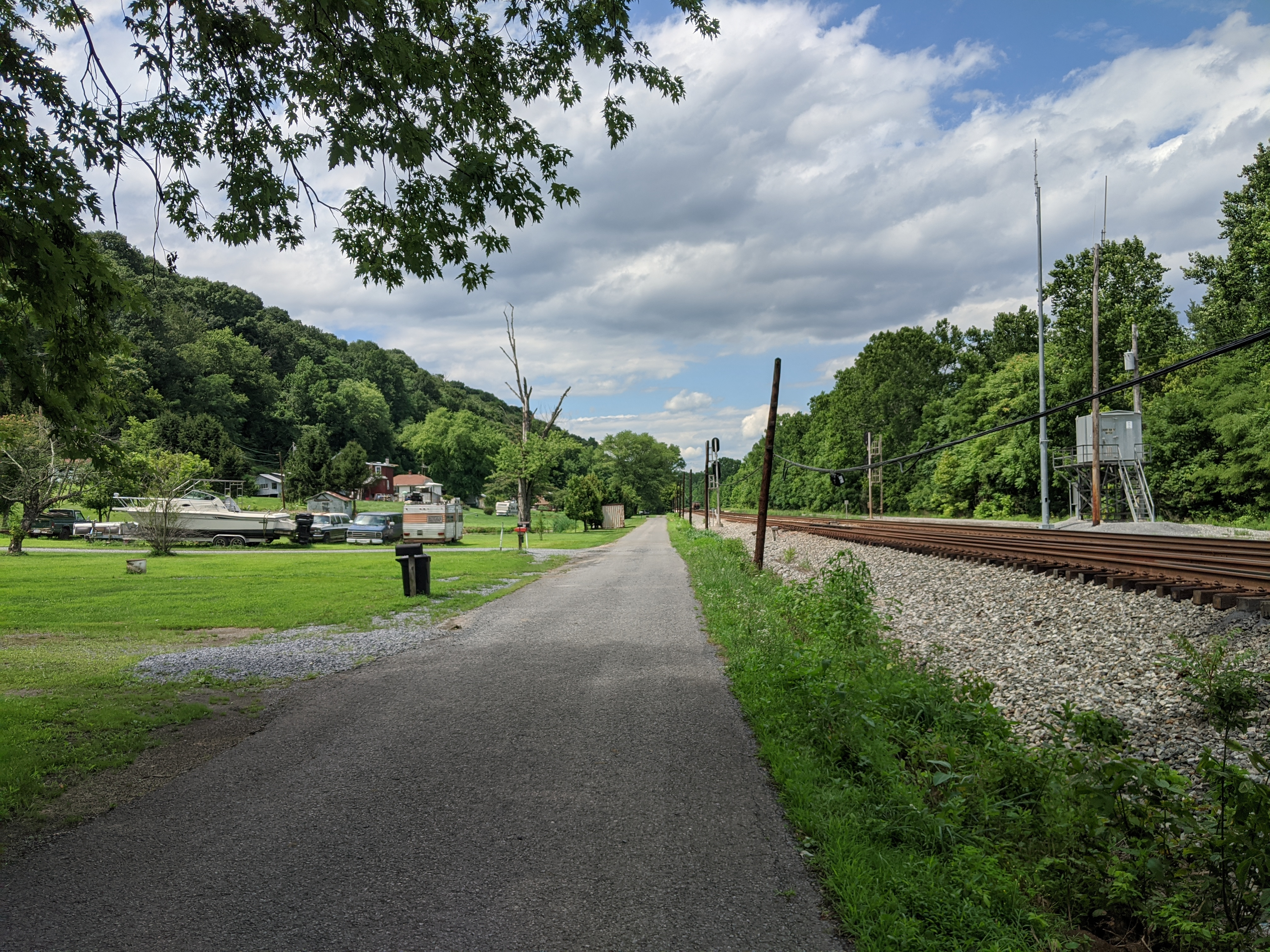
Chessie Lane along the B&O Mainline in Cherry Run
