= North Berkeley, West Virginia =

North Berkeley
- Unincorporated community
- Location within the state of West Virginia North Berkeley (the United States)
- Coordinates: 39°37′51″N 78°13′16″W
- Country: United States
- State: West Virginia
- County: Morgan
- Time zone: UTC-5 (Eastern (EST))
  - Summer (DST): UTC-4 (EDT)
- GNIS feature ID: 1555232

North Berkeley is an unincorporated community in Morgan County in the U.S. state of West Virginia's Eastern Panhandle. The community lies between the Town of Bath (Berkeley Springs) limits and Jimtown. Like Jimtown, North Berkeley does not lie within the limits of Berkeley Springs proper, but it is generally considered a neighborhood of the town. The community is the site of the North Berkeley Primary School.
