= Jerome, West Virginia =

Jerome
- Unincorporated community
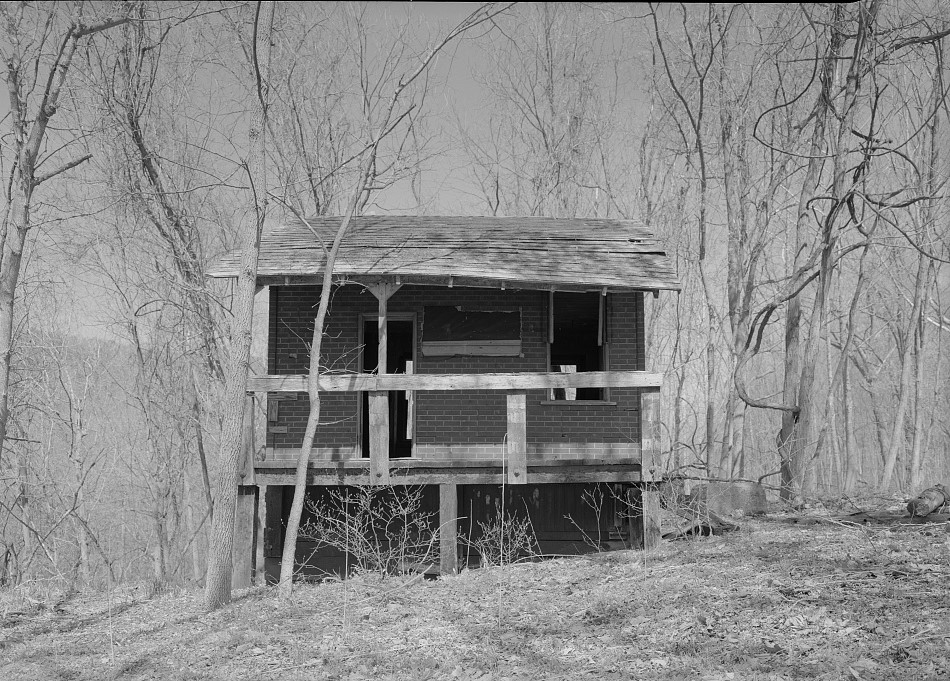
- Jerome operator's cabin on the Western Maryland Railway

- Location within the state of West Virginia Jerome (the United States)
- Coordinates: 39°35′4″N 78°27′24″W
- Country: United States
- State: West Virginia
- County: Morgan
- Time zone: UTC-5 (Eastern (EST))
  - Summer (DST): UTC-4 (EDT)
- GNIS feature ID: 1554805

Jerome is an uninhabited community along the old Baltimore and Ohio Railroad main line in Morgan County in the U.S. state of West Virginia. It is located entirely within the Chesapeake and Ohio Canal National Historical Park on the Potomac River. Jerome is also the site of a stretch of the Western Maryland Railway right-of-way from milepost 126 to milepost 160 listed on the National Register of Historic Places. Located in the "Paw Paw Bends", Jerome was considered to be one of the most inaccessible places reached by the Western Maryland Rwy.

At Jerome, the train order office was in use until it was closed on September 1, 1959. When it was abandoned by the Chessie System in May 1975, the office was not torn down and is one of the few buildings that remain today in Jerome. There was also an operating connection with the B&O "low line" (see Magnolia, West Virginia) at milepost 137 but it was later removed when the B&O abandoned the low line in 1961. The community and its station on the railroad are rumored to have been named for Jérôme Bonaparte.
