= Berkeley Springs State Park =

Thermal springs and state park in Morgan County, West Virginia

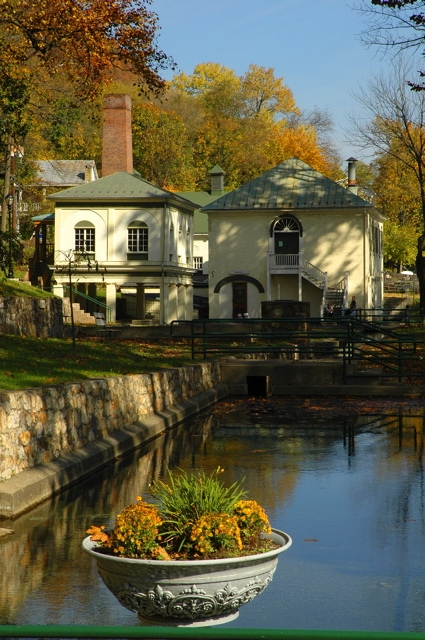
- Park buildings

- Location within West Virginia
- Location: Morgan, West Virginia, United States
- Coordinates: 39°37′36″N 78°13′40″W
- Area: 7 acres (2.8 ha)
- Elevation: 617 ft (188 m)
- Established: July 1, 1970
- Website: wvstateparks.com/park/berkeley-springs-state-park/
- Berkeley Springs State Park
- U.S. National Register of Historic Places
- U.S. Historic district
- Location: S. Washington and Fairfax Sts., Berkeley Springs, West Virginia
- Area: 5 acres (2.0 ha)
- Built: 1785
- Built by: James Rumsey
- NRHP reference No.: 76001943
- Added to NRHP: May 24, 1976

Berkeley Springs State Park is a state park situated in Berkeley Springs, West Virginia, United States. The centerpiece of the Park is its historic mineral spa. These waters were celebrated for their medicinal or restorative powers and were generally taken internally for digestive disorders, or bathed in for stress relief. Native Americans visited these springs as did George Washington. Berkeley Springs is the only state-run spa in the United States and is operated by the West Virginia Division of Natural Resources.

== History ==
The park is located on land which has been used as a health resort since the 1750s as the property of Lord Fairfax. On 18 March 1748, George Washington, then 16, visited the spa for the first time. An annual event is held to commemorate this historic visit, but the tub where Washington supposedly bathed was rebuilt in the 1930s. Colonial maps dating as early as 1740 credit medicinal properties to the springs' waters.

The land was officially granted to Virginia in 1776. The town of Bath was incorporated that same year (it was called Warm Springs before its incorporation).

The historic Roman Bathhouse, the oldest public building in Berkeley Springs, was built in Federal-style architecture in 1815 on the site of an earlier bathhouse attributed to James Rumsey. The earlier bathhouse, built in 1784, is described as having had five bathing chambers and dressing rooms.

On 1 January 2019, the Old Roman Bathhouse building closed down for renovation (including handicap access, new bath tiles, bath benches, new boiler system) for a period of 6 months and a $1-million budget.

== Mineral springs ==
Water flows from natural mineral springs at a constant temperature of 74.3 degrees, emerging from the Oriskany (Ridgeley) sandstone of Warm Springs Ridge. Five major springs merge on the location of the spa. The water contains significant amounts of sulfates, nitrates, and carbonates—mostly magnesium carbonates. The discharge varies from 750 to 2,000 US gallons (2,800 to 7,600 L) per minute.

The water is available for bathing at two park bathhouses and for drinking from a fountain at the 19th century Gentlemen's Spring House — as well as from every tap in town since the springs serve as the source of the municipal water supply. The current bathhouse includes nine separate bathing chambers with tubs capable of holding a total 750 gallons of water heated to 102 degrees. These baths are open to the public daily throughout the year and water is also bottled and sold commercially.

The town is also the organizer of the annual Berkeley Springs’ International Water Tasting Competition.

== Museum ==
The Museum of the Berkeley Springs is located on the second floor of the bathhouse. Established in 1984, it exhibits various historical items of natural and cultural significance to the springs and town. Admission is free, and the museum is open at least on weekends from March through December.

== Ecology ==
The waters that leak directly from the spring are home to an introduced population of guppies that date to around the early 1940s. Originally from South America, they are able to survive throughout the year due to the constantly warm waters that outflow from the spring.

Several other species of fish make their way up from Warm Spring Run into the hot spring itself. These fish include eastern blacknose dace, creek chub, central stoneroller, and bluntnose and cutlips minnows. There are also crayfish in the spring, and water snakes are seen occasionally as well.

== Gallery ==
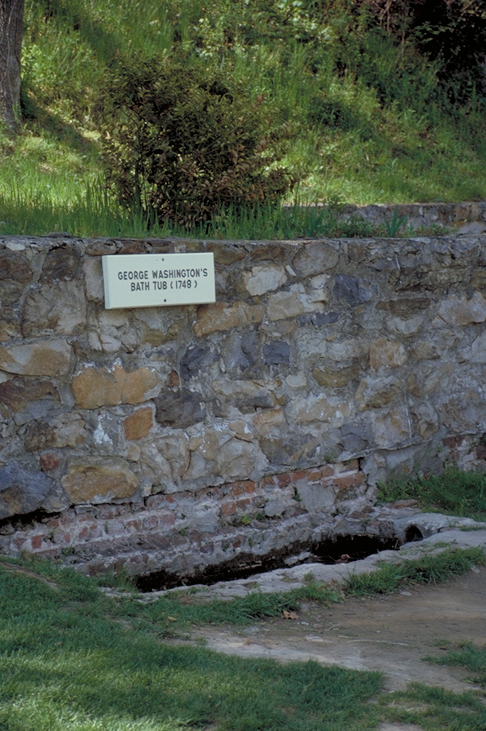
"Bathtub" used by George Washington

== Popular culture ==
Berkeley Springs State Park is a location in Fallout 76, as Berkeley Springs West.

== See also ==
- National Register of Historic Places listings in West Virginia
- List of West Virginia state parks
