= Ridersville, West Virginia =

Ridersville
- Unincorporated community
- Location within the state of West Virginia Ridersville (the United States)
- Coordinates: 39°37′26″N 78°11′26″W
- Country: United States
- State: West Virginia
- County: Morgan
- Time zone: UTC-5 (Eastern (EST))
  - Summer (DST): UTC-4 (EDT)
- GNIS feature ID: 1555476

Ridersville is an unincorporated community between Berkeley Springs and Stohrs Crossroads along Martinsburg Road (West Virginia Route 9) in Morgan County, West Virginia. It is located on Pious Ridge (804 ft) where Pious Ridge Road (CR 4) and Peter Yost Road (CR 9/8) intersect with WV 9. Ridersville sprang up in the 19th century as a small farming community along the Martinsburg Road with a general store. It had its own operating post office until it was closed in 1903 due to the community's proximity to Berkeley Springs. During its period as an independent agrarian town, it was known as Friendship, Rider Store, Riderville, and finally as Ridersville. Today, it is merely a growing residential area of Berkeley Springs.
