= Green Ridge, Arkansas =

Unincorporated community in Scott County, Arkansas

Coordinates: 34°55′25″N 94°01′26″W

Green Ridge is an unincorporated community in Scott County, in the U.S. state of Arkansas.

== History ==
Green Ridge was founded in 1872. A variant name is "Greenridge". A post office was established at Green Ridge in 1872, and remained in operation until 1938.
