= Burnt Factory, West Virginia =

Unincorporated community in West Virginia, United States

Burnt Factory
- Unincorporated community
- Location within the state of West Virginia Burnt Factory (the United States)
- Coordinates: 39°39′21″N 78°12′31″W
- Country: United States
- State: West Virginia
- County: Morgan
- Time zone: UTC-5 (Eastern (EST))
  - Summer (DST): UTC-4 (EDT)
- GNIS feature ID: 1554035

Burnt Factory is an unincorporated community in Morgan County, West Virginia north of Berkeley Springs. It is located along Sand Mine Road (West Virginia Secondary Route 38/1) off Hancock Road (U.S. Route 522) and is the site of the U.S. Silica Company's Berkeley Springs plant. U.S. Silica is a producer of ground and unground silica sand, kaolin clay, and aplite. These materials are extracted from Warm Spring Ridge directly across U.S. Route 522 from the facility in Burnt Factory.
