= Omps, West Virginia =

Omps
- Unincorporated community
- Location within the state of West Virginia Omps (the United States)
- Coordinates: 39°30′24″N 78°17′21″W
- Country: United States
- State: West Virginia
- County: Morgan
- Time zone: UTC-5 (Eastern (EST))
  - Summer (DST): UTC-4 (EDT)
- GNIS feature ID: 1544404

Omps is an unincorporated community that lies along U.S. Route 522 in Morgan County, West Virginia, USA. Omps previously had a post office that operated between 1887 and 1973.

The community was named after one Mr. Omps, an original owner of the town site.

== Attractions ==
Omps features the entrance to the Cacapon Resort State Park. It has proximity to a number of other notable locations, such as Berkeley Springs.
