= Morgan County, West Virginia =

County in West Virginia, United States

- County
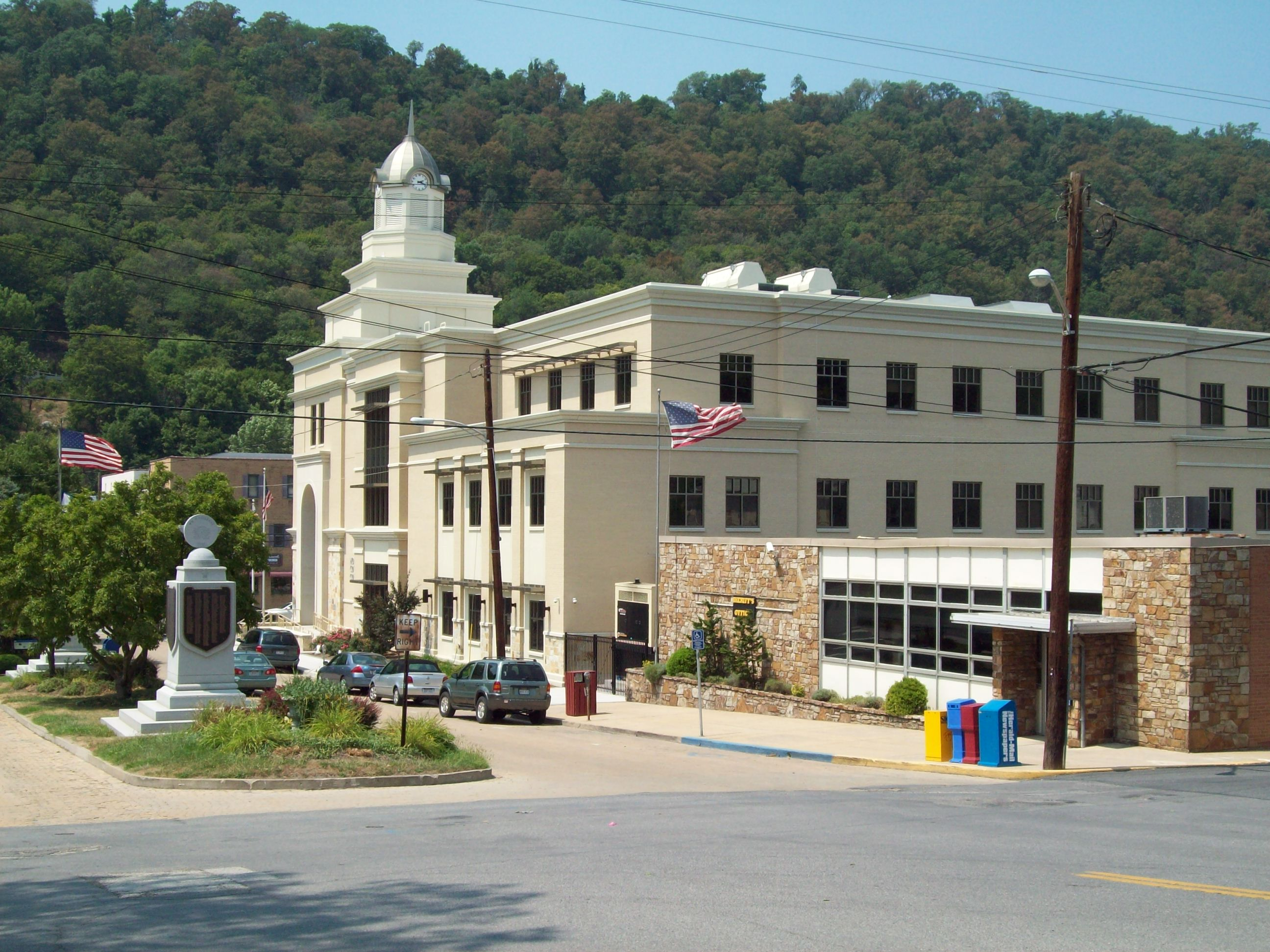
- Morgan County Courthouse Complex, July 2011

- Flag

- Location within the U.S. state of West Virginia
- Coordinates: 39.56°N 78.26°W
- Country: United States
- State: West Virginia
- Founded: February 9, 1820
- Named for: Daniel Morgan
- Seat: Berkeley Springs
- Largest town: Berkeley Springs

Area
  - Total: 230 sq mi (600 km^{2})
  - Land: 229 sq mi (590 km^{2})
  - Water: 0.5 sq mi (1.3 km^{2}) 0.2%

Population (2020)
  - Total: 17,063
  - Estimate (2025): 18,027 ▲
  - Density: 74.5/sq mi (28.8/km^{2})
- Time zone: UTC−5 (Eastern)
  - Summer (DST): UTC−4 (EDT)
- Congressional district: 2nd
- Website: morgancountywv.gov

Morgan County is a county located in the U.S. state of West Virginia. As of the 2020 census, the population was 17,063. Its county seat is Berkeley Springs. The county was formed in 1820 from parts of Hampshire and Berkeley Counties and named in honor of General Daniel Morgan, prominent soldier of the American Revolutionary War. The county and Town of Bath are considered excellent jumping-off points for exploring the Potomac and Cacapon Rivers just to the north and west, respectively. Also, the county is a tourist destination hosting numerous local artists, mineral water spas, and a large amount of outdoor recreation that includes fishing, boating, wildlife, hunting, and mountain scenery. The region is known for the famed Apple Butter Festival, which is annually held in October. Morgan County is also the home of an important silica mine, part of U.S. Silica.

== History ==
Morgan County was created by an act of the Virginia General Assembly in February 1820 from parts of Berkeley and Hampshire counties. It was named in honor of General Daniel Morgan (1736–1802). He was born in Hunterdon County, New Jersey, and moved to Winchester, Virginia as a youth. He served as a wagoner in Braddock's Army during the campaign against the Native Americans in 1755. During the campaign, a British Lieutenant became angry with him and hit him with the flat of his sword. Morgan punched the Lieutenant, knocking him unconscious. Morgan was court-martialed for striking a British officer and was sentenced to 500 lashes. Morgan later joked that the drummer who counted out the lashes miscounted and he received only 499 lashes. For the rest of his life, he claimed the British still owed him one.

=== Early European settlers ===
The first English settlers in present-day Morgan County arrived during the 1730s. Because most of these early pioneers were squatters, there is no record of their names. Historians claim that the first cabin in the county was built around 1745. As word of the county's warm springs spread eastward, Thomas Fairfax, 6th Lord Fairfax of Cameron decided that the county needed to be surveyed. In 1748, George Washington, then just 16 years old, was part of the survey party that surveyed the Eastern Panhandle region for Lord Fairfax. He later returned to Bath (Berkeley Springs) several times over the next several years with his half-brother, Lawrence, who was ill and hoped that the warm springs might improve his health. The springs, and their rumored medicinal benefits, attracted numerous Native Americans as well as Europeans to the area.

=== 18th century ===
As mentioned previously, George Washington visited present-day Berkeley Springs several times with his half-brother, Lawrence. When he vacationed in the area in 1767, he noted how busy the town had become. Lord Fairfax had built a summer home there and a "private bath" making the area a popular destination for Virginia's social elite. As the town continued to grow, the Virginia General Assembly decided to formally recognize it. In October 1776, the town was officially named Bath, in honor of England's spa city called Bath. The town's main north–south street was named Washington and the main east–west street was named Fairfax. Also, seven acres (28,000 m^{2}) were set aside for "suffering humanity." When West Virginia gained statehood, that area became West Virginia's first state park.

Bath's population increased during and immediately after the American Revolutionary War as wounded soldiers and others came to the area believing that the warm springs had medicinal qualities. Bath gained a reputation as a somewhat wild town where eating, drinking, dancing, and gambling on the daily horse races were the order of the day.

Bath later became known as Berkeley Springs, primarily because the town's post office took that name (combining Governor Norborne Berkeley's last name with the warm springs found there) to avoid confusion with another post office, located in southeastern Virginia, which was already called Bath. Because the mail was sent to and from Berkeley Springs, that name slowly took precedence.

=== 19th century ===
Morgan County was one of fifty Virginia counties that were admitted to the Union as the state of West Virginia on June 20, 1863. Later that year, the counties were divided into civil townships, with the intention of encouraging local government. This proved impractical in the heavily rural state, and in 1872 the townships were converted into magisterial districts. Morgan County was divided into six districts: Allen, Bath, Cacapon, (Note: Also called "Great Cacapon" before 1900.) Rock Gap, Sleepy Creek, and Timber Ridge. Except for minor adjustments, the historic magisterial districts remained unchanged until the 1980s, when they were consolidated into three new districts: District 1, District 2, and District 3. A District 4 was created in the 1990s, but subsequently discontinued.

=== 20th century ===
On April 10, 1919, racial violence broke out when the Morgan County race riot was sparked by local business using African-American strikebreakers against local striking white workers. On the same day of the riots one Hugh Ferguson, a Martinsburg African-American, was accused of criminally assaulting Mrs. Ernest Zimmerman at her home near Brosius, Morgan County (now known as Hancock, West Virginia). An angry mob of several hundred men formed around the jail hoping to lynch Ferguson. Sheriff C. R. Hovermale was forced to flee town with Ferguson.

== Geography ==
According to the United States Census Bureau, the county has a total area of 230 square miles (600 km^{2}), of which 229 square miles (590 km^{2}) is land and 0.5 square miles (1.3 km^{2}) (0.2%) is water.

=== Major highways ===
- U.S. Highway 522
- West Virginia Route 9

=== Adjacent counties ===
- Washington County, Maryland (north)
- Berkeley County (east)
- Frederick County, Virginia (southeast)
- Hampshire County (southwest)
- Allegany County, Maryland (northwest)

=== Rivers and streams ===
- Potomac River
- Cacapon River
- Cherry Run
- Sir Johns Run
- Sleepy Creek
- Meadow Branch
- Warm Spring Run

== Demographics ==
Historical population
Census	Pop.	Note	%±
1820	2,500		—
1830	2,694		7.8%
1840	4,253		57.9%
1850	3,557		−16.4%
1860	3,732		4.9%
1870	4,315		15.6%
1880	5,777		33.9%
1890	6,744		16.7%
1900	7,294		8.2%
1910	7,848		7.6%
1920	8,357		6.5%
1930	8,406		0.6%
1940	8,743		4.0%
1950	8,276		−5.3%
1960	8,376		1.2%
1970	8,547		2.0%
1980	10,711		25.3%
1990	12,128		13.2%
2000	14,943		23.2%
2010	17,541		17.4%
2020	17,063		−2.7%
2025 (est.)	18,027	▲	5.6%
U.S. Decennial Census; 1790–1960 1900–1990; 1990–2000 2010–2020

=== 2020 census ===
As of the 2020 census, the county had a population of 17,063. Of the residents, 18.2% were under the age of 18 and 24.5% were 65 years of age or older; the median age was 49.0 years. For every 100 females there were 99.9 males, and for every 100 females age 18 and over there were 98.8 males.

The racial makeup of the county was 93.7% White, 0.7% Black or African American, 0.2% American Indian and Alaska Native, 0.5% Asian, 0.5% from some other race, and 4.5% from two or more races. Hispanic or Latino residents of any race comprised 1.4% of the population.

There were 7,142 households in the county, of which 24.4% had children under the age of 18 living with them and 22.4% had a female householder with no spouse or partner present. About 26.8% of all households were made up of individuals and 14.6% had someone living alone who was 65 years of age or older.

Among households, 56.4% were married couples living together, 19.9% had a female householder with no spouse present, and 16.1% had a male householder with no spouse present. The average household and family size was 2.93.

There were 9,071 housing units, of which 21.3% were vacant. Among occupied housing units, 82.4% were owner-occupied and 17.6% were renter-occupied. The homeowner vacancy rate was 1.8% and the rental vacancy rate was 10.8%.

The median income for a household was $56,616 and the poverty rate was 8%.

Morgan County, West Virginia – Racial and ethnic composition Note: the US Census treats Hispanic/Latino as an ethnic category. This table excludes Latinos from the racial categories and assigns them to a separate category. Hispanics/Latinos may be of any race.
Race / Ethnicity (NH = Non-Hispanic)	Pop 2000	Pop 2010	Pop 2020	% 2000	% 2010	% 2020
White alone (NH)	14,596	16,949	15,896	97.68%	96.63%	93.16%
Black or African American alone (NH)	89	96	108	0.60%	0.55%	0.63%
Native American or Alaska Native alone (NH)	26	43	30	0.17%	0.25%	0.18%
Asian alone (NH)	18	50	83	0.12%	0.29%	0.49%
Pacific Islander alone (NH)	2	4	0	0.01%	0.02%	0.00%
Other race alone (NH)	5	10	53	0.03%	0.06%	0.31%
Mixed race or Multiracial (NH)	83	206	657	0.56%	1.17%	3.85%
Hispanic or Latino (any race)	124	183	236	0.83%	1.04%	1.38%
Total	14,943	17,541	17,063	100.00%	100.00%	100.00%

=== 2010 census ===
As of the 2010 United States census, there were 17,541 people, 7,303 households, and 5,015 families living in the county. The population density was 76.6 inhabitants per square mile (29.6/km^{2}). There were 9,753 housing units at an average density of 42.6 per square mile (16.4/km^{2}). The racial makeup of the county was 97.3% white, 0.6% black or African American, 0.3% Asian, 0.3% Native American, 0.2% from other races, and 1.3% from two or more races. Those of Hispanic or Latino origin made up 1.0% of the population. In terms of ancestry, 27.0% were German, 13.2% were Irish, 11.5% were American, and 10.6% were English.

Of the 7,303 households, 27.8% had children under the age of 18 living with them, 54.1% were married couples living together, 8.9% had a female householder with no husband present, 31.3% were non-families, and 25.7% of all households were made up of individuals. The average household size was 2.39 and the average family size was 2.84. The median age was 45.0 years.

The median income for a household in the county was $37,281 and the median income for a family was $49,974. Males had a median income of $39,372 versus $27,949 for females. The per capita income for the county was $20,732. About 11.9% of families and 15.8% of the population were below the poverty line, including 22.0% of those under age 18 and 10.6% of those age 65 or over.

=== 2000 census ===
As of the census of 2000, there were 14,943 people, 6,145 households, and 4,344 families living in the county. The population density was 65 inhabitants per square mile (25/km^{2}). There were 8,076 housing units at an average density of 35 per square mile (14/km^{2}). The racial makeup of the county was 98.30% White, 0.60% Black or African American, 0.17% Native American, 0.12% Asian, 0.01% Pacific Islander, 0.23% from other races, and 0.57% from two or more races. 0.83% of the population were Hispanic or Latino of any race.

There were 6,145 households, out of which 28.70% had children under the age of 18 living with them, 57.90% were married couples living together, 8.20% had a female householder with no husband present, and 29.30% were non-families. Of all households, 24.50% were made up of individuals, and 10.20% had someone living alone who was 65 years of age or older. The average household size was 2.40 and the average family size was 2.84.

The age distribution is 22.40% under the age of 18, 6.80% from 18 to 24, 27.30% from 25 to 44, 26.90% from 45 to 64, and 16.60% who were 65 years of age or older. The median age was 41 years. For every 100 females there were 96.60 males. For every 100 females age 18 and over, there were 95.00 males.

The median income for a household in the county was $35,016, and the median income for a family was $40,690. Males had a median income of $29,816 versus $22,307 for females. The per capita income for the county was $18,109. About 8.00% of families and 10.40% of the population were below the poverty line, including 11.60% of those under age 18 and 8.80% of those age 65 or over.

== Government and public safety ==
=== County government ===
Morgan County Commission is a three-member elective body. The term of office for each Commission member is six years, with one term expiring every two years. The current commissioners are Sean Forney, Joel Tuttle, and Bill Clark, with Forney serving as the President.

=== County sheriff ===
The Morgan County Sheriff's Office operates the county jail, provides court protection, provides county building and facility security, and provides patrol and detective services for the county. Johnnie C. Walter Jr. is the current Sheriff.

=== County clerk ===
The current county clerk is Kimberly Nickles.

=== County assessor ===
The current assessor is Debbie Weaver.

=== Magistrates ===
Morgan County has two Magistrates: Kermit Ambrose and Greg Miller

== Politics ==
Morgan County has historically been a stronghold for the Republican Party. Every Republican presidential nominee has won Morgan County since 1864, the first presidential election following West Virginia's statehood. The last Democratic presidential nominee to win Morgan County was Lewis Cass in 1848; the county was won by the Whig Party, the Know-Nothing Party and John Bell's Constitutional Union Party in its last three elections as part of Virginia.

The county is a massive outlier in West Virginia, a state that tilted Democratic for much of the 20th century before swinging hard to the GOP. Franklin Roosevelt did no better than 39 percent of the county's vote, and only two Democrats—Lyndon Johnson and Jimmy Carter—have managed even 40 percent of the vote. The 1964 United States presidential election was by far the closest election here, with Barry Goldwater taking the county by a margin of just 46 votes.

United States presidential election results for Morgan County, West Virginia
Year	Republican		Democratic		Third party(ies)	
Year	No.	%	No.	%	No.	%
1912	612	34.89%	549	31.30%	593	33.81%
1916	1,208	63.45%	666	34.98%	30	1.58%
1920	1,817	71.48%	712	28.01%	13	0.51%
1924	1,883	63.10%	919	30.80%	182	6.10%
1928	2,539	76.75%	758	22.91%	11	0.33%
1932	2,082	59.78%	1,358	38.99%	43	1.23%
1936	2,555	61.07%	1,620	38.72%	9	0.22%
1940	2,563	66.59%	1,286	33.41%	0	0.00%
1944	2,303	72.01%	895	27.99%	0	0.00%
1948	2,159	66.09%	1,104	33.79%	4	0.12%
1952	2,699	70.78%	1,114	29.22%	0	0.00%
1956	2,946	72.74%	1,104	27.26%	0	0.00%
1960	2,752	66.78%	1,369	33.22%	0	0.00%
1964	1,866	50.62%	1,820	49.38%	0	0.00%
1968	2,244	60.32%	1,015	27.28%	461	12.39%
1972	3,014	72.94%	1,118	27.06%	0	0.00%
1976	2,369	55.12%	1,929	44.88%	0	0.00%
1980	2,833	61.23%	1,594	34.45%	200	4.32%
1984	3,469	70.34%	1,457	29.54%	6	0.12%
1988	3,002	65.78%	1,545	33.85%	17	0.37%
1992	2,585	48.37%	1,854	34.69%	905	16.93%
1996	2,599	51.16%	1,929	37.97%	552	10.87%
2000	3,639	63.05%	1,939	33.59%	194	3.36%
2004	4,511	65.88%	2,272	33.18%	64	0.93%
2008	4,428	60.86%	2,721	37.40%	127	1.75%
2012	4,513	63.82%	2,363	33.42%	195	2.76%
2016	5,732	74.09%	1,573	20.33%	432	5.58%
2020	6,537	75.17%	1,998	22.98%	161	1.85%
2024	7,009	77.05%	1,947	21.40%	141	1.55%

== Communities ==
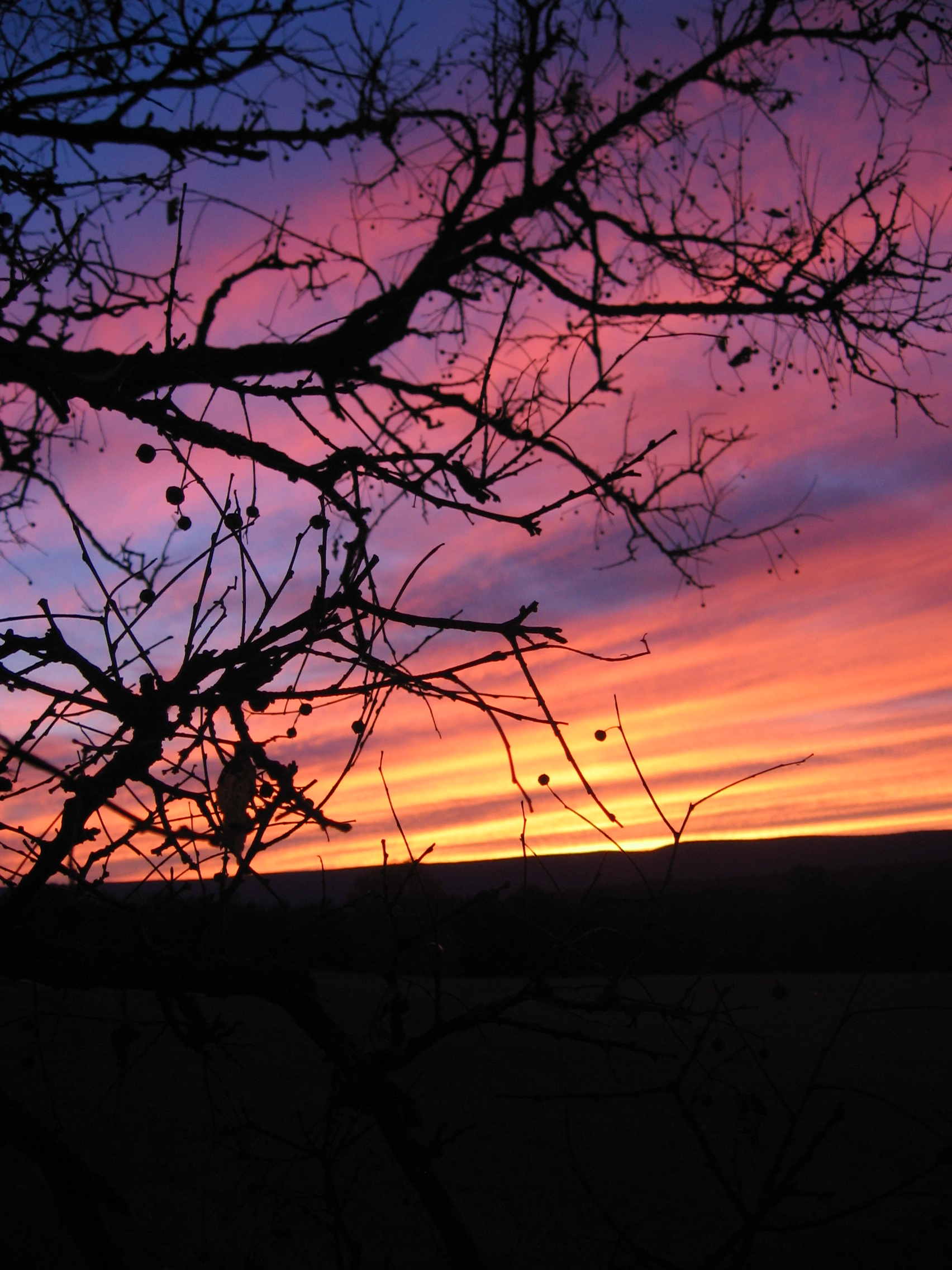
Sunset over Morgan County, West Virginia

=== Towns ===
- Berkeley Springs (county seat)
- Paw Paw

=== Magisterial districts ===
==== Current ====
- District 1
- District 2
- District 3

==== Historic ====
- Allen
- Bath
- Cacapon
- Rock Gap
- Sleepy Creek
- Timber Ridge
- District 4

=== Census-designated places ===
- Great Cacapon

=== Unincorporated communities ===
- Berryville
- Burnt Factory
- Campbells
- Cherry Run
- Doe Gully
- Duckwall
- Green Ridge
- Greenwood
- Hancock (formerly Brosius)
- Hansrote
- Holton
- Jerome
- Jimtown
- Johnsons Mill
- Largent
- Lineburg
- Magnolia
- Mount Trimble
- New Hope
- North Berkeley
- Oakland
- Omps
- Orleans Cross Roads
- Redrock Crossing
- Ridersville
- Ridge
- Rock Gap
- Sir Johns Run
- Sleepy Creek
- Smith Crossroads
- Spohrs Crossroads
- Stotlers Crossroads
- Unger
- Woodmont
- Woodrow

== Historic places ==
The following are listed on the National Register of Historic Places:

Site	Year built	Address	Community	Listed
Ambrose Chapel	mid-19th century	Winchester Grade Road (CR 13)	Stotlers Crossroads	1998
Berkeley Springs State Park	mid-18th century	South Washington & Fairfax Streets	Berkeley Springs	1976
Berkeley Springs Train Depot	1915	342 North Washington Street (US 522)	Berkeley Springs	2001
Chesapeake and Ohio Canal National Historical Park	early 19th century	Chesapeake & Ohio Canal	Paw Paw	1966
Clarence Hovermale House (Allen Mendenhall House)	late 19th century	167 Wilkes Street	Berkeley Springs	2003
Great Cacapon Bridge	1937	Great Cacapon	Great Cacapon	2025
John Herbert Quick House (Coolfont Manor House)	1913	73 Manor House Lane	Berkeley Springs	1984
Judge John W. Wright Cottage	1872	156 South Green Street	Berkeley Springs	1986
Largent Bridge	1916	Largent	Largent	2025
New Deal Resources in Cacapon State Park Historic District	1934	818 Cacapon Lodge Drive	Berkeley Springs	2019
Morgan County Courthouse	1923	202 Fairfax Street (CR 9/9)	Berkeley Springs	2005
Samuel Taylor Suit Cottage (Berkeley Castle)	1885	276 Cacapon Road (WV 9)	Berkeley Springs	1980
Sloat-Horn-Rossell House (The Manor)	late 19th century	234 Fairfax Street (CR 9/9)	Berkeley Springs	1984
T. H. B. Dawson House	1880	139 South Green Street	Berkeley Springs	1983
Town of Bath Historic District	1776-1959	Center roughly intersection of Fairfax St and Washington St	Berkeley Springs	2009
Paw Paw Old Mayor's Office and Jail	1893	93 Lee St	Paw Paw	2023
Saint Charles Catholic Mission Church	1876	153 Winchester St	Paw Paw	2024
Paw Paw Black School	1928	Amelia St	Paw Paw	2024
Sen P. E. Nixon House	1909	Winchester St	Paw Paw	2024
Western Maryland Railroad Right-of-Way, Milepost 126 to Milepost 160	20th century	Milepost 126 to Milepost 160	Jerome	1981

== See also ==
- Morgan County Schools
- Berkeley Springs State Park
- Cacapon Resort State Park
- National Register of Historic Places listings in Morgan County, West Virginia
- USS Morgan County (LST-1048)

== General and cited references ==
- Marcelle, Dale (2016). Pitchforks and Negro Babies: America's Shocking History of Hate. AuthorHouse. ISBN 9781524625764. - Total pages: 328
- "Negro Nearly Lynched After Brutal Attack". The Intelligencer and Wheeling News Register. Wheeling, West Virginia. April 10, 1919. OCLC 13502337.
