= Spohrs Crossroads, West Virginia =

Spohrs Crossroads
- Unincorporated community
- Location within the state of West Virginia Spohrs Crossroads (the United States)
- Coordinates: 39°38′0″N 78°8′49″W
- Country: United States
- State: West Virginia
- County: Morgan
- Time zone: UTC-5 (Eastern (EST))
  - Summer (DST): UTC-4 (EDT)
- GNIS feature ID: 1547438

Spohrs Crossroads is an unincorporated community along Martinsburg Road (West Virginia Route 9) to the west of Sleepy Creek in Morgan County in the U.S. state of West Virginia. The community was originally named Spohrs Cross Roads for the local Spohr family. It is sometimes erroneously known as Stohrs Cross Roads or Stohrs Crossroads.

Spohrs "Crossroads" is formed by Martinsburg Road's intersection with the Potomac-Virginia Line Road, Morgan County Route 8. North of Spohrs Crossroads, Morgan County Route 8 is known as Potomac Road, and south of the crossroads, it is known as Spohr's Road. It reaches the Virginia state line at Unger where it is known as Virginia Line Road.
