= Berryville, West Virginia =

Unincorporated community in West Virginia, United States

Berryville
- Unincorporated community
- Location within the state of West Virginia Berryville (the United States)
- Coordinates: 39°36′56″N 78°13′47″W
- Country: United States
- State: West Virginia
- County: Morgan
- Time zone: UTC-5 (Eastern (EST))
  - Summer (DST): UTC-4 (EDT)
- GNIS feature ID: 1553869

Berryville is a former independent community in Morgan County in the U.S. state of West Virginia. Located south of downtown Berkeley Springs, Berryville sprouted up along U.S. Route 522 at the beginning of the 20th century; first as a farming community and then as a residential extension of a growing Berkeley Springs. It remains outside the Bath town limits. Berryville includes Berkeley Springs High School, Widmyer Elementary School, and Greenway Cemetery.
