= Doe Gully, West Virginia =

Unincorporated community in West Virginia, United States

Doe Gully
- Unincorporated community
- Location within the state of West Virginia Doe Gully (the United States)
- Coordinates: 39°36′27″N 78°23′23″W
- Country: United States
- State: West Virginia
- County: Morgan
- Time zone: UTC-5 (Eastern (EST))
  - Summer (DST): UTC-4 (EDT)
- GNIS feature ID: 1554314

Doe Gully is an unincorporated community along the Potomac River in Morgan County in the U.S. state of West Virginia's Eastern Panhandle. Located along the old Baltimore and Ohio Railroad where it bisects a bend in the Potomac by way of the Randolph Tunnel, Doe Gully is only accessible by way of Doe Gulley Lane (West Virginia Secondary Route 18/2) from Orleans Road (West Virginia Secondary Route 18/1). It is located southwest of Orleans Cross Roads. The Chesapeake and Ohio Canal National Historical Park crosses the Potomac River onto the West Virginia side to Doe Gulley's west and it also lies directly across the river from it. Like most of the old B&O railroad stations and their communities, Doe Gully is popular with railfans.
