= Hancock, West Virginia =

Hancock
- Unincorporated community
- Location within the state of West Virginia
- Coordinates: 39°41′34″N 78°10′39″W
- Country: United States
- State: West Virginia
- County: Morgan
- Time zone: UTC-5 (Eastern (EST))
  - Summer (DST): UTC-4 (EDT)
- GNIS feature ID: 1554635

Hancock is an unincorporated community hamlet in Morgan County in the U.S. state of West Virginia's Eastern Panhandle. It is located off Hancock Road (U.S. Route 522) on River Road (West Virginia Secondary Route 1) along the Potomac River north of Berkeley Springs. Originally known as Brosius, its post office's name was changed to Hancock in 1948 to reflect its location on the Baltimore and Ohio Railroad mainline across the river from Hancock, Maryland.

Hancock is also accessible by way of Fairview Drive (West Virginia Secondary Route 2) from Berkeley Springs and also Pious Ridge Road (West Virginia Secondary Route 4) from Ridersville on Martinsburg Road (West Virginia Route 9).
