= Jimtown, Morgan County, West Virginia =

Jimtown
- Unincorporated community
- Location within the state of West Virginia Jimtown (the United States)
- Coordinates: 39°38′13″N 78°13′3″W
- Country: United States
- State: West Virginia
- County: Morgan
- Time zone: UTC-5 (Eastern (EST))
  - Summer (DST): UTC-4 (EDT)
- GNIS feature ID: 1554811

Jimtown is an unincorporated community in Morgan County in the U.S. state of West Virginia. Because of its proximity to the north of the Town of Bath (Berkeley Springs) limits, Jimtown is generally considered a neighborhood of Berkeley Springs. The community is also referred to as Jimstown.
