= Magnolia, West Virginia =

Magnolia
- Unincorporated community
- Location within the state of West Virginia Magnolia (the United States)
- Coordinates: 39°33′42″N 78°25′37″W
- Country: United States
- State: West Virginia
- County: Morgan
- Time zone: UTC-5 (Eastern (EST))
  - Summer (DST): UTC-4 (EDT)
- GNIS feature ID: 1555023

Magnolia is an unincorporated community northeast of Paw Paw in Morgan County in the U.S. state of West Virginia on the Potomac River. Magnolia is located along the Baltimore and Ohio Railroad mainline and east of where the Western Maryland Railway crosses the Potomac, bypassing a series of bends in the river. As a depot and water station on the B&O, Magnolia has been known by a number of names including Magnolia Dale, Magnolia Vale, and sometimes as Water Station Number 12 on the railroad.

== Origins ==
The name Magnolia, as passed down from oral tradition, was a combination of Timothy Norton's two daughters Maggie and Nora. The addition of the names yielded Magnora and was modified to Magnolia. Timothy Norton was an early resident of the town and worked for the railroad. It is believed that the hamlet came into being because of the Baltimore and Ohio Railroad (B&O Railroad). The railroad opened a line from Washington, D.C. to Cumberland, Maryland following the Potomac River in 1842. There were many servicing facilities along the right-of-way for steam engines. One of these facilities was Water Station Number 12 which later became Magnolia.

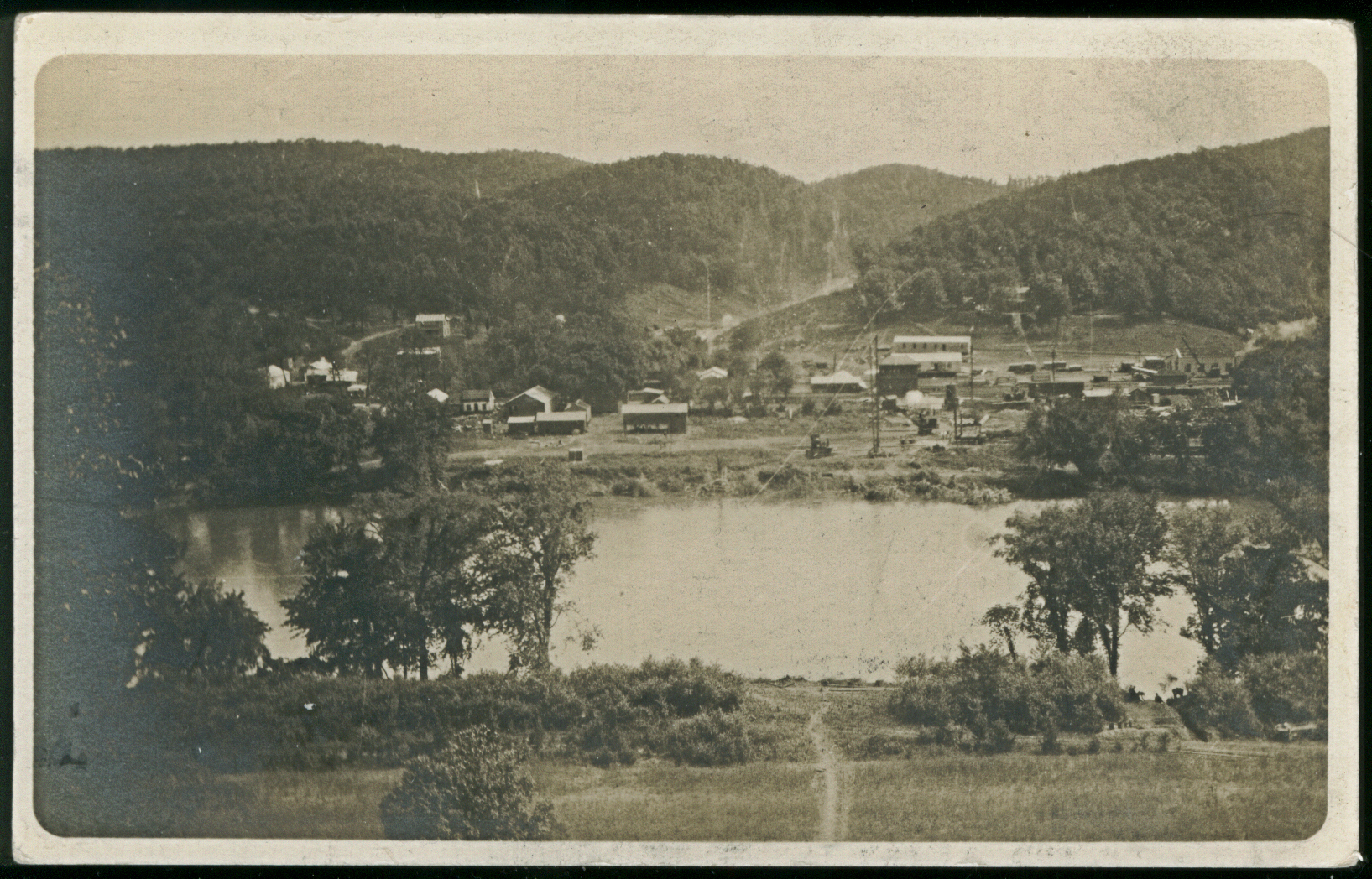
Photo of Magnolia from Across the Potomac (1906-1910)

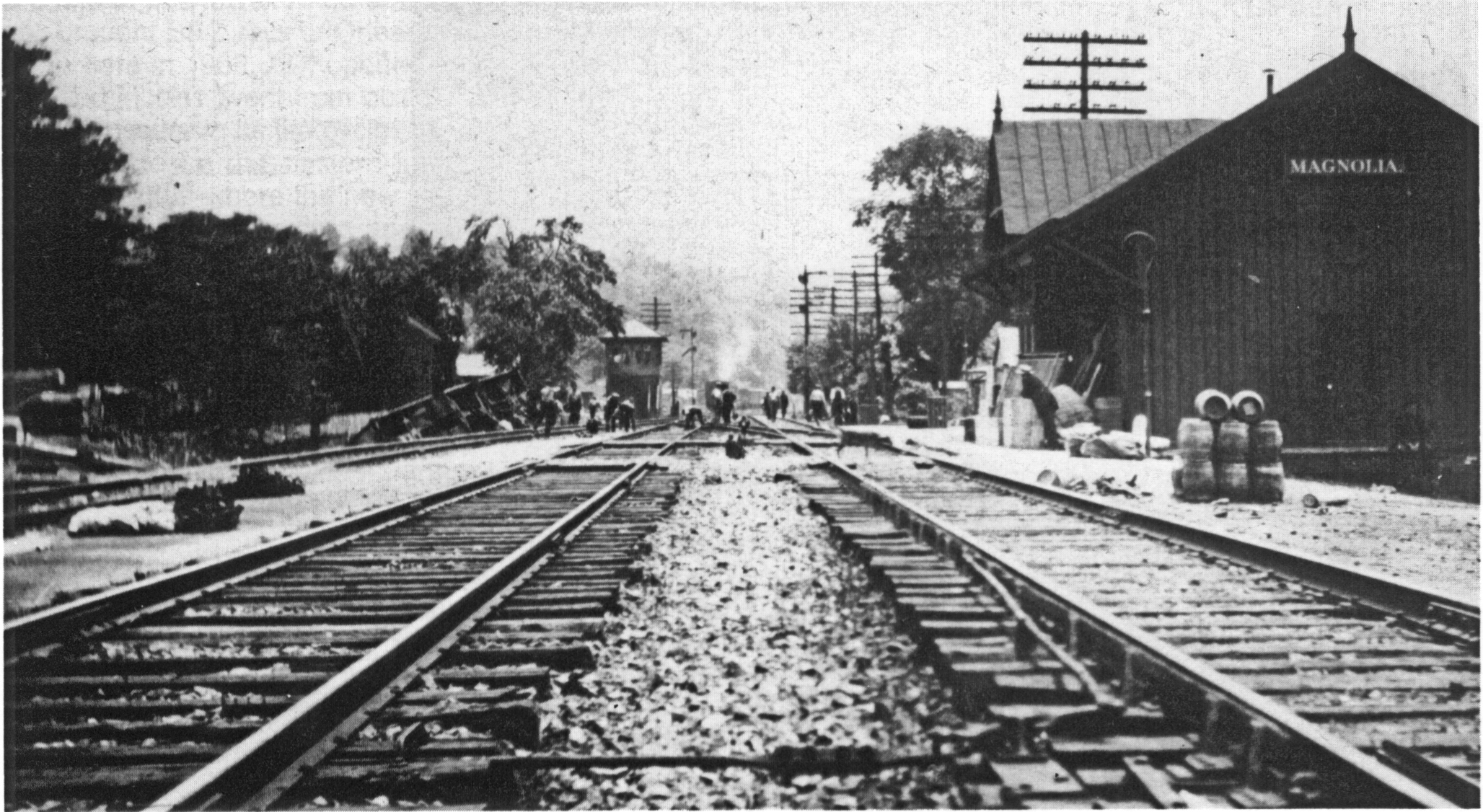
Photo of Magnolia Station (1906-1910)

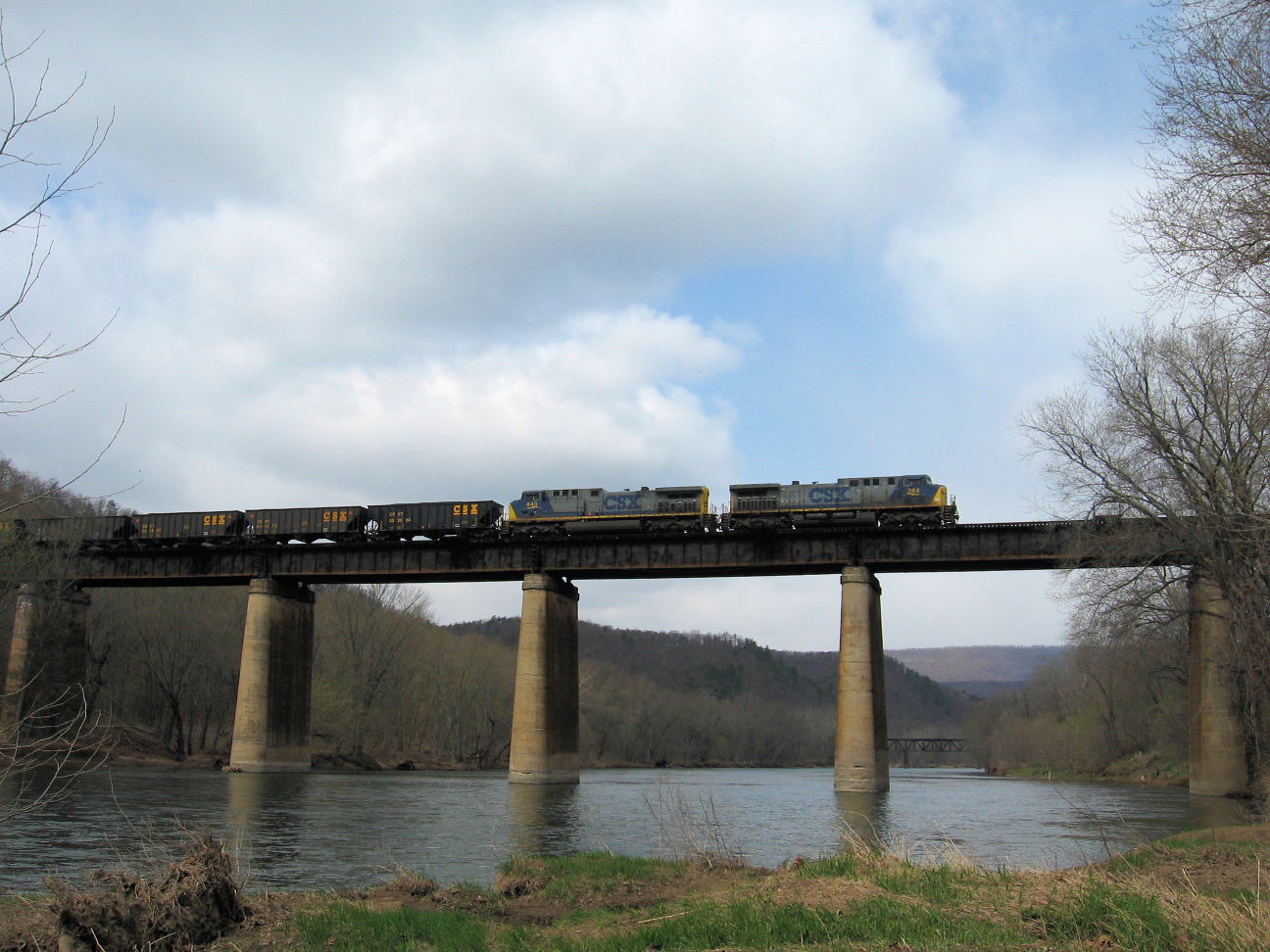
CSX Train on bridge at Magnolia (2007)

== United States Civil War ==
In the spring of 1862, during the United States Civil War, Company E of the Union Army's 54th Pennsylvania Infantry Regiment guarded Water Station Number 12 (later Magnolia) against Confederate raids on the B&O Railroad and its environs.

== Construction of the B&O Cutoff ==
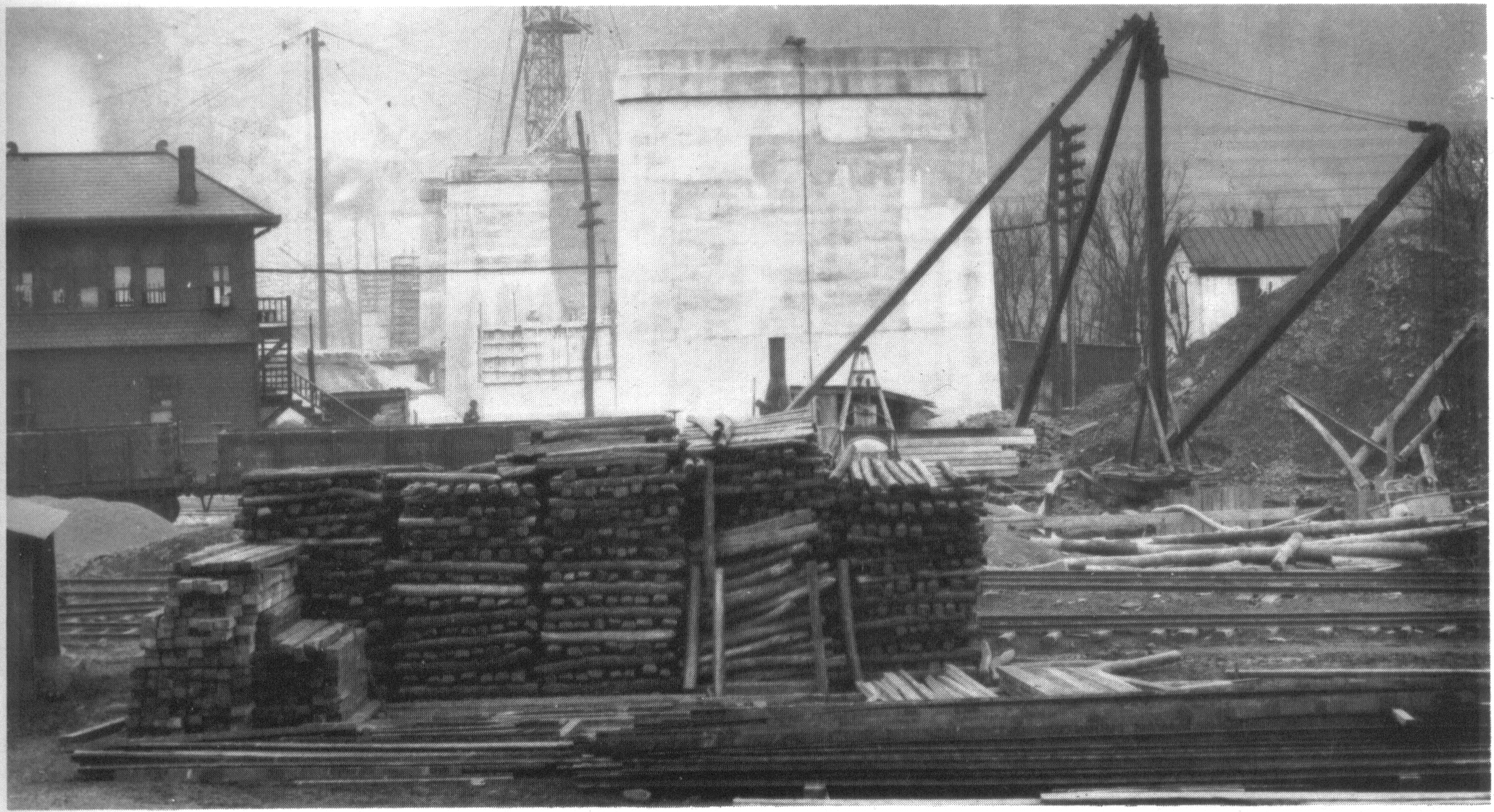
B&O Tower at Magnolia

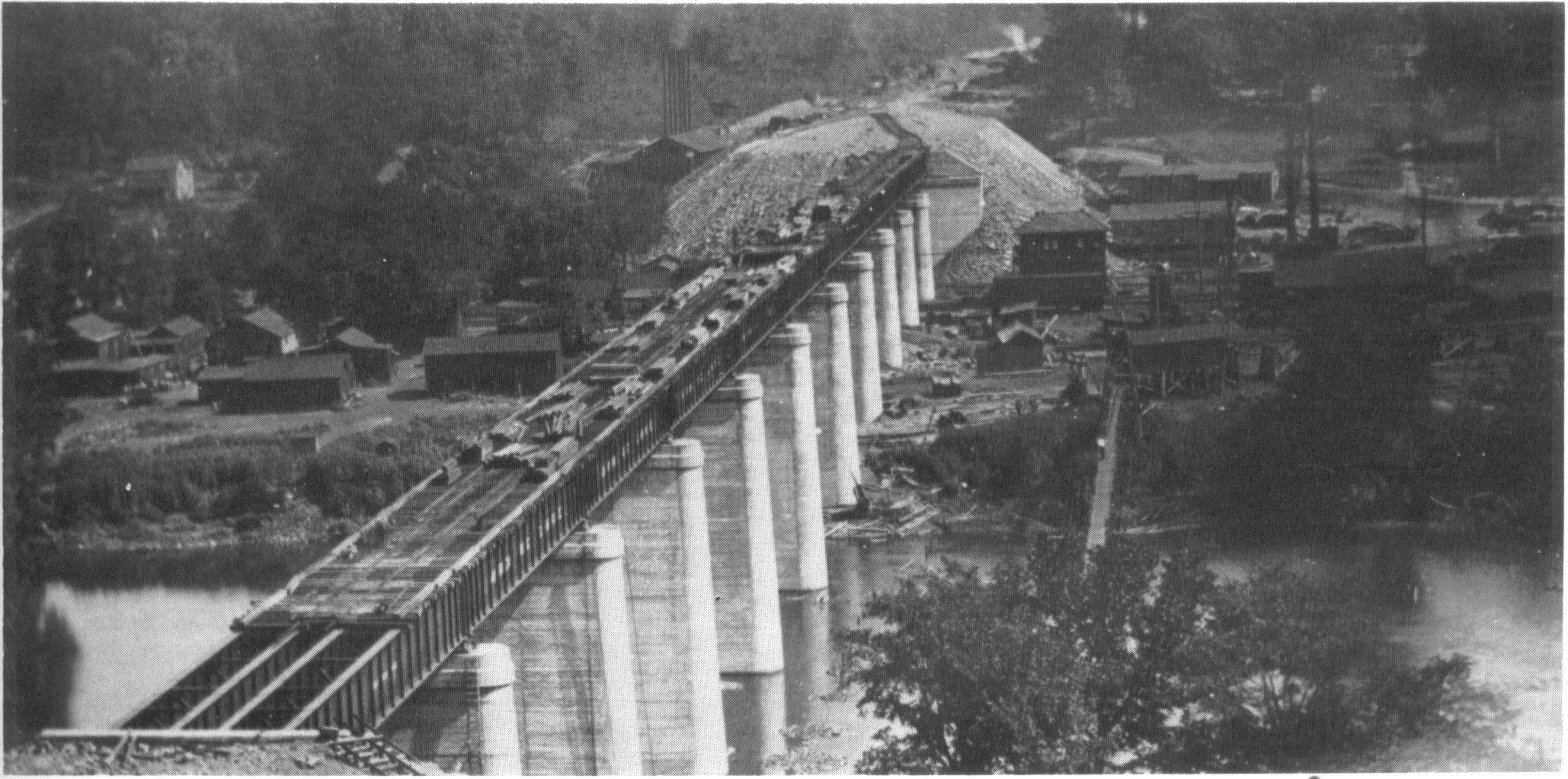
Nearing completion of the B&O bridge across the Potomac

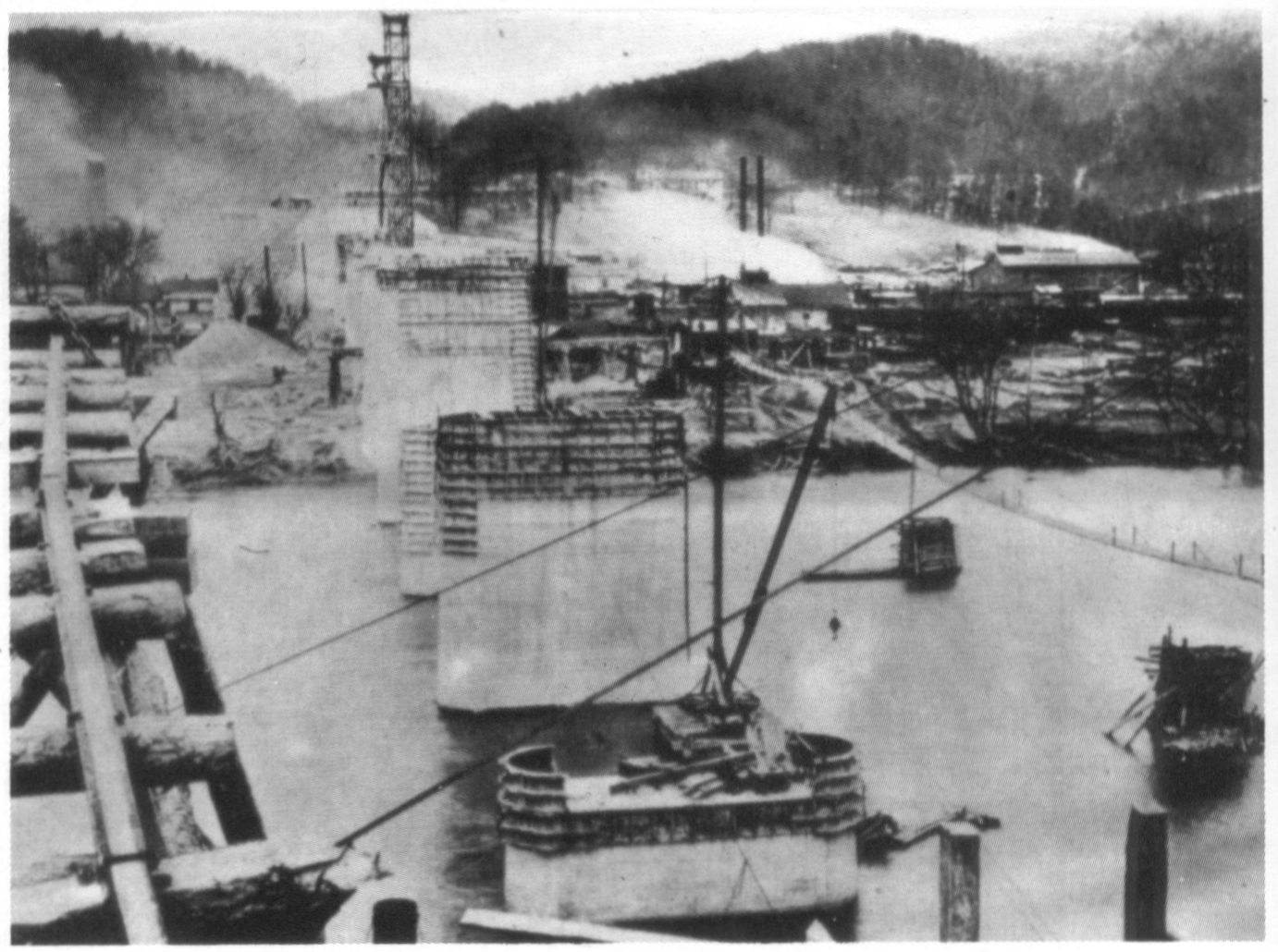
Construction of the Piers at Magnolia

=== Second Construction Site for the Baltimore & Ohio ===
During 1910 to 1914 Magnolia was one of two staging points for construction of the Magnolia Cutoff. The cutoff provided a surplus of jobs in the area which resulted in growth for this small town. The town of Magnolia lent its name to this new shorter route through the mountains. As may be seen in the pictures, the railroad scaled above the town of Magnolia, effectively cutting it off from the railroad. The low line route of the B&O was still used for passenger traffic and did so many years after the construction.

=== Amenities During Construction ===
Construction of the Magnolia Cutoff was partially based at Magnolia. Magnolia boasted a large power plant with two 6,100 horsepower (4,500 kW) boilers and two direct current generators that were capable of producing 200 kilowatts. This power was used for the two sawmills, lighting, and a forging blacksmith shop. A construction camp was also assembled in town.

=== Railroad Bridge ===
The new railroad bridge towers over Magnolia at a 50 ft (15 m) elevation. The bridge has six 100 ft (30 m), three 80 ft (24 m), and two 75 ft (23 m) deck plate girder spans. At a length of about 1,000 feet (300 m) long with 10 reinforced concrete piers, this is the smaller of the two bridges built for the Magnolia Cutoff.

== Modern Magnolia ==
=== 1950s ===
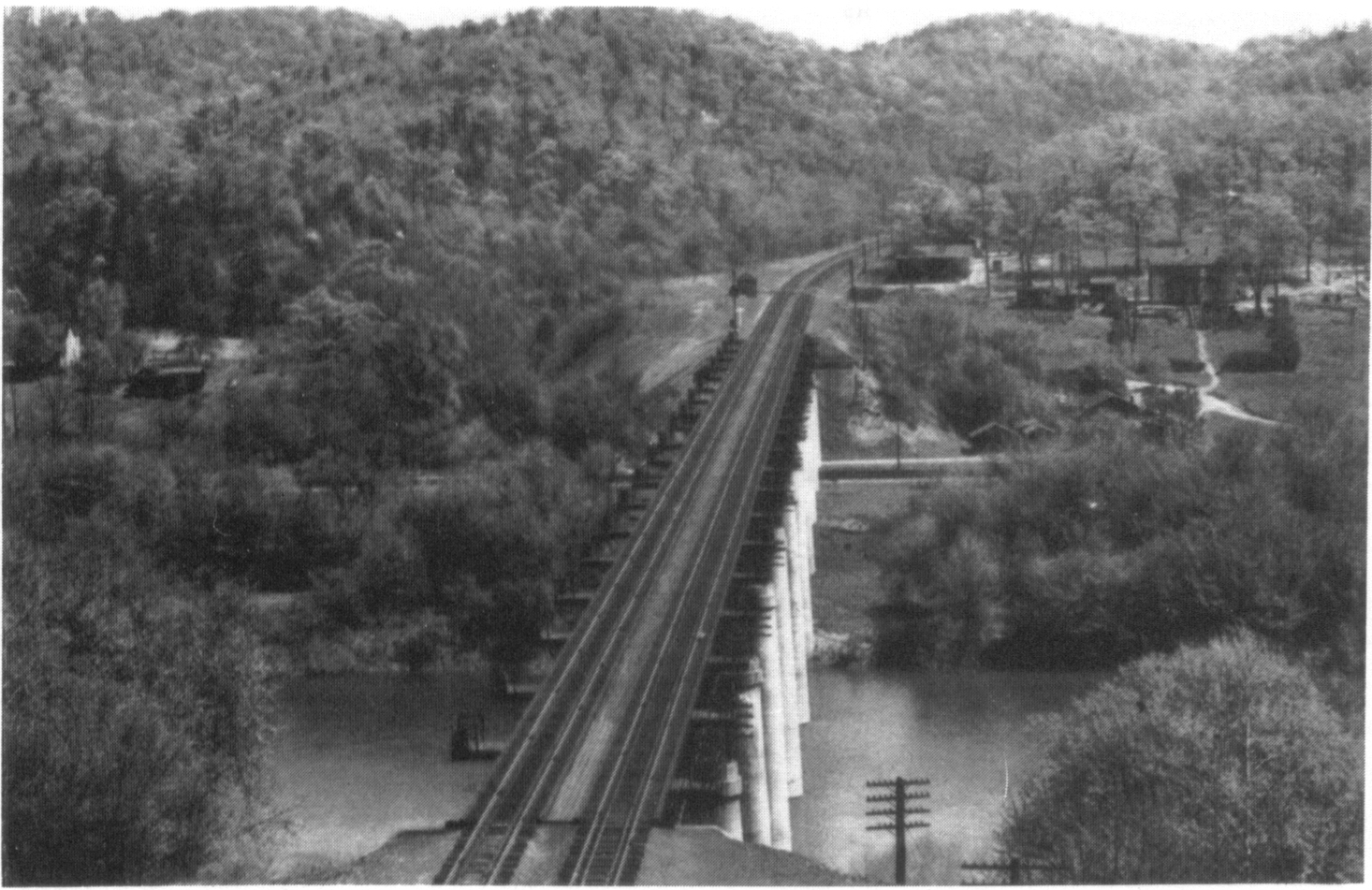
View of completed bridge in 1950s

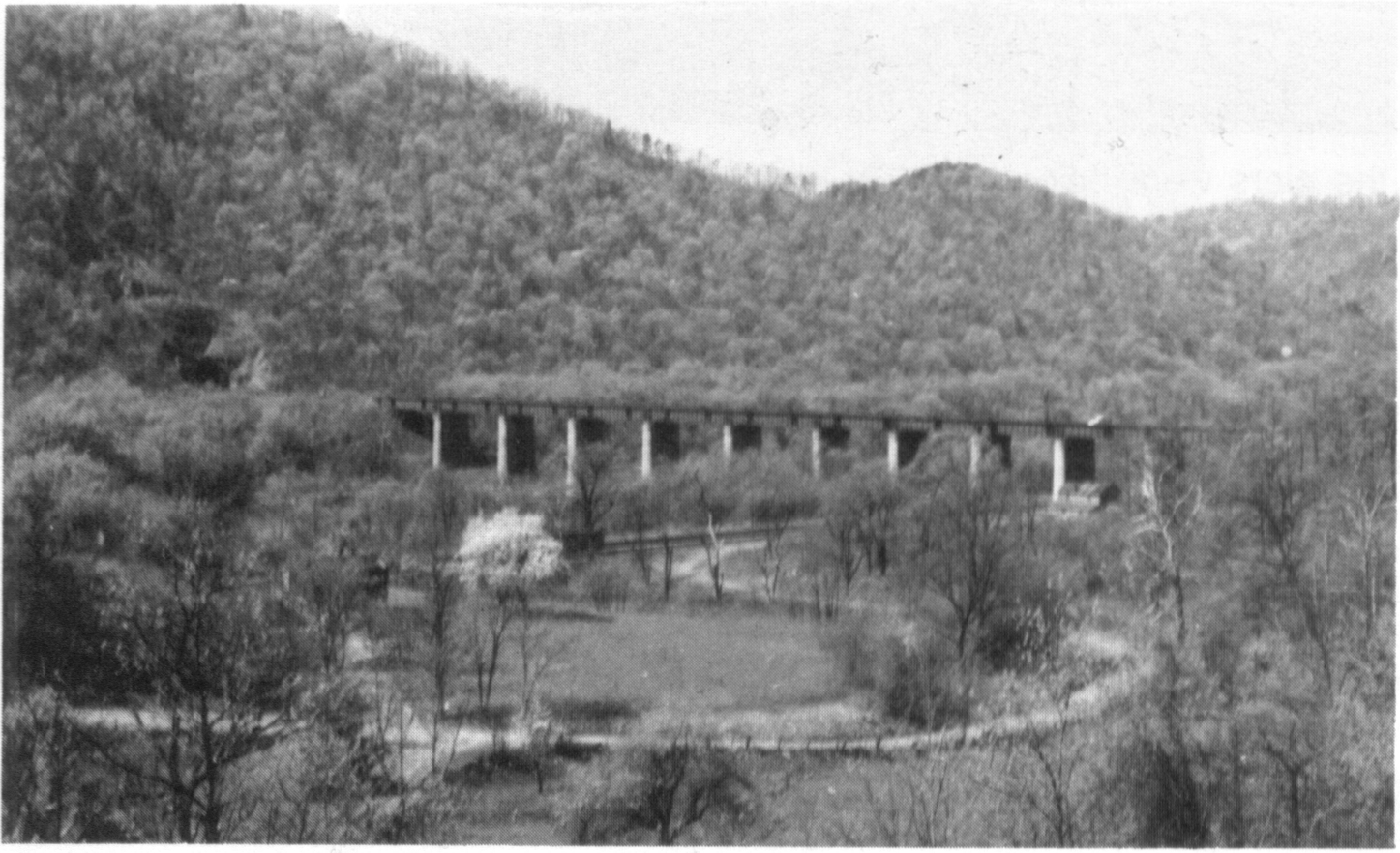
Side view of Magnolia in 1950s

After the construction was complete, jobs in the area were scarce. Later, the Flood of 1936 would devastate the area and the demise of passenger service brought the demise of Magnolia as a town. Buildings were left vacant and the railroad would desert its Water Station Number 12. In these photos, we can see a period when both rail routes existed.

=== Current Day ===
Today there are little traces that Magnolia was once a place of such activity. The low line along the Potomac has been removed and is only a path. Only a few private homes remain in this small village, and the clearings under the bridge often used as campsites are privately owned. Trespassing within them is not advised.

== Schools ==
The community had its own school, Magnolia School, until it was closed in 1952, in favor of sending students from the Magnolia area to attend the schools in Paw Paw.

== Post office ==
Magnolia also had its own post office in operation from 1867 to 1868 as Magnolia Vale, and then again in 1871 to 1943 as Magnolia, when it too was closed and the residents of Magnolia were assigned Paw Paw addresses.

== Notable people ==
- Amelita Ward, actress, was born in Magnolia.

== Directions ==
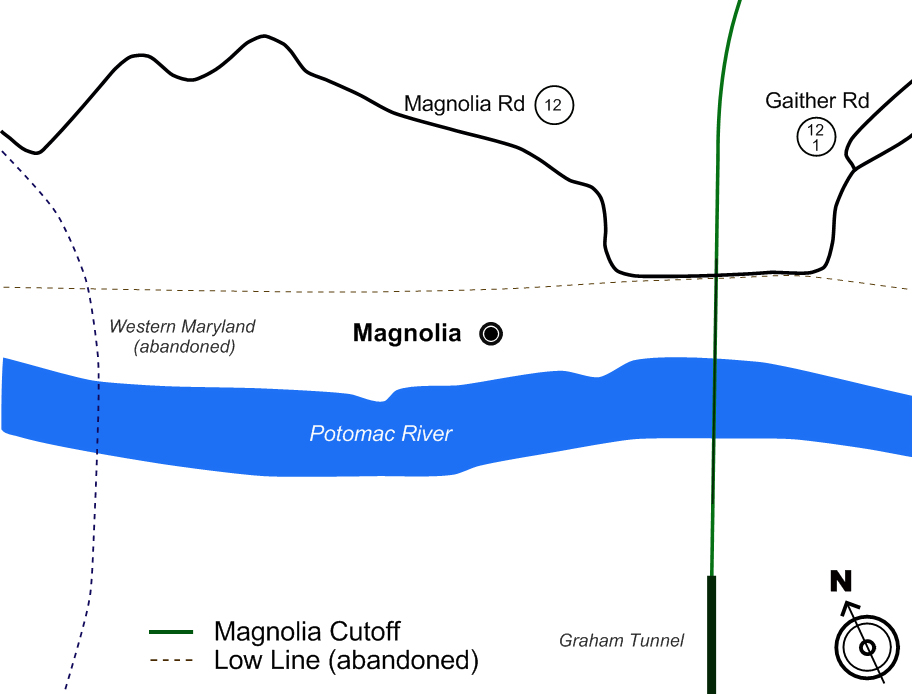
Map of the Magnolia Area

Magnolia can be accessed by way of Magnolia Road (West Virginia Secondary Route 12). On the B&O, it is located between Paw Paw to the southwest and Jerome to the northwest.
