= Unger, West Virginia =

Unger
- Unincorporated community
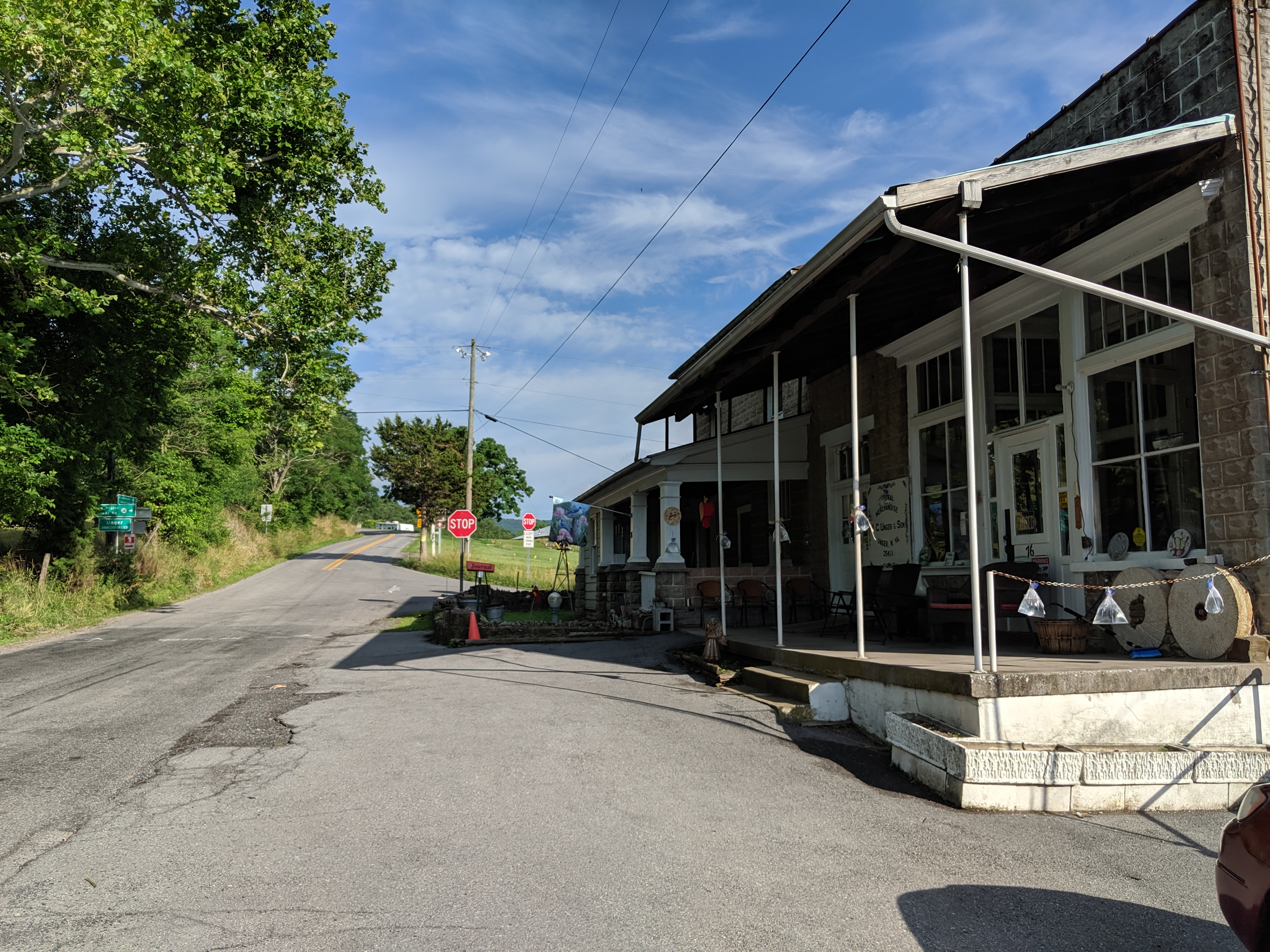
- Main intersection and Unger's Store
- Nickname: Ungers Store
- Location within the state of West Virginia Unger (the United States)
- Coordinates: 39°26′12″N 78°15′14″W
- Country: United States
- State: West Virginia
- County: Morgan
- Post office established: 1853
- Time zone: UTC-5 (Eastern (EST))
  - Summer (DST): UTC-4 (EDT)
- ZIP codes: 25447 (Discontinued)
- GNIS feature ID: 1548462

Unger is an unincorporated community in southern Morgan County in the U.S. state of West Virginia. Unger is distinguished amongst other towns in Morgan County for retaining an operating post office since one was established there in 1853. From 1857 to 1935, it was known as Unger's Store until March 31, 1950 (see image) its name was then shortened to Unger on April 1, 1950 (see image).

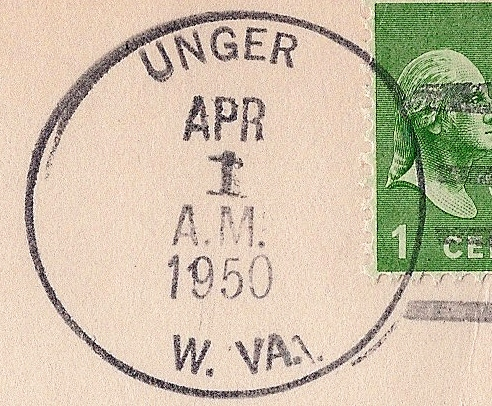
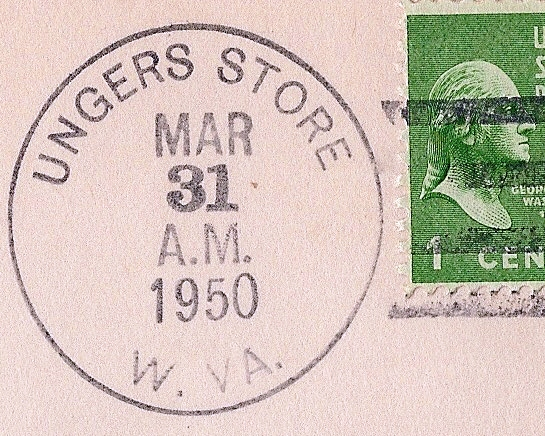

Unger is located at the crossroads of Winchester Grade Road (West Virginia Secondary Route 13) and Unger's Store Road (West Virginia Secondary Route 11).

As of 2008 or earlier, the post office at Unger has been closed (the Berkeley Springs post office serves Unger). Unger does, however, boast The Farnham Colossi at Unger: http://www.roadsideamerica.com/tip/3699 and the former Unger's Store still sells produce on the porch in season. On the ground, the road is marked Unger's Store Road eastbound, (Big Oak Tree Road westbound) intersecting with Timber Ridge Road at a large oak tree. However, GPS systems and internet mapping sites often call what is locally known and posted as Unger's Store Road "Blue Rock" or "Blue Roack" road. There are no signs on the ground with these designations.

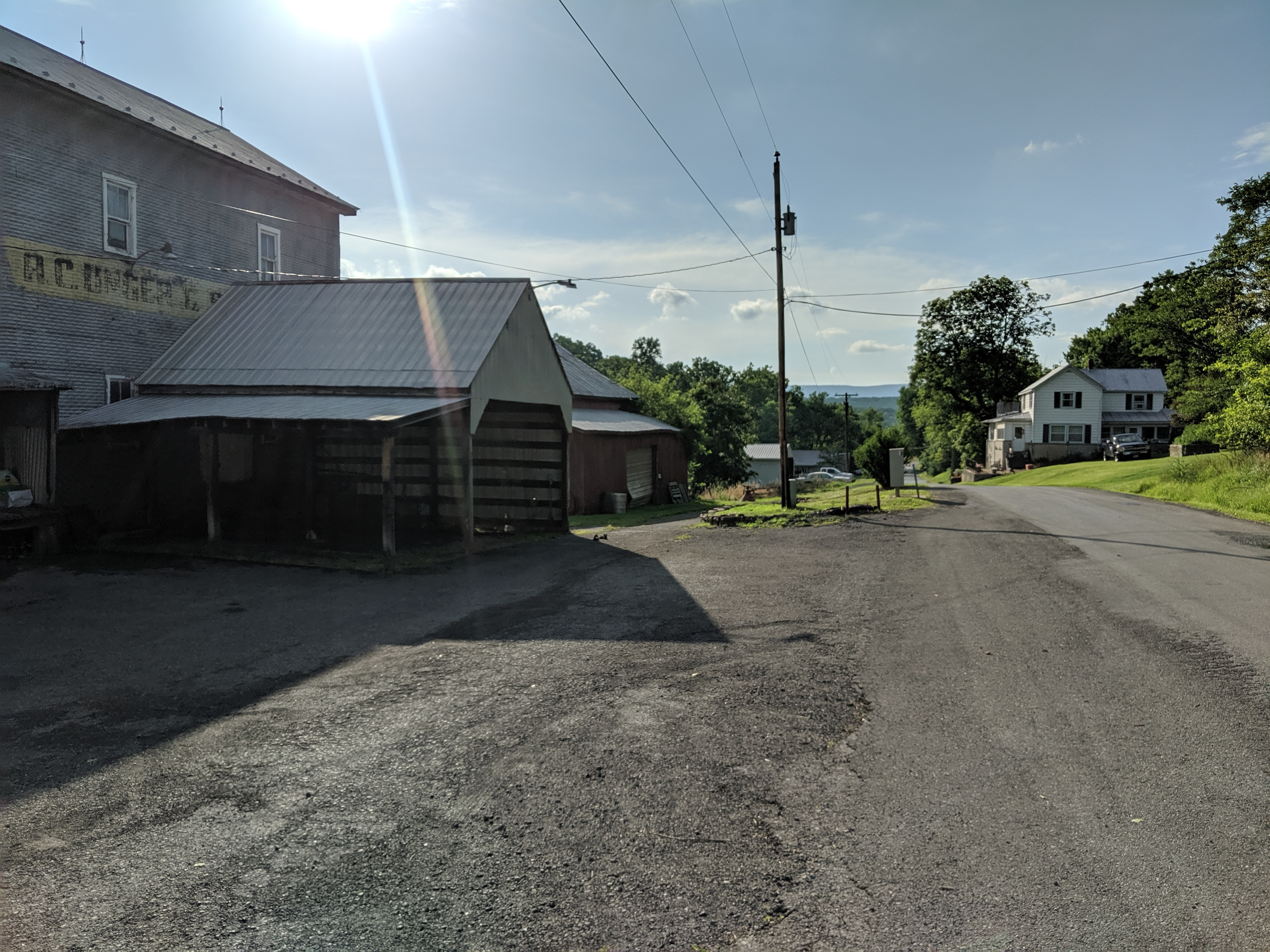
Ungers Store Road (County Route 11) through Unger.
