= Shady Grove School =

Shady Grove School may refer to:

in the United States

(by state)

- Shady Grove School (Pea Ridge, Arkansas), listed on the NRHP in Arkansas
- Shady Grove School and Community Building, DeRidder, LA, listed on the NRHP in Louisiana
- Shady Grove School in Whittemore, Michigan
- Shady Grove School (Louisa County, Virginia), listed on the NRHP in Virginia
