= U.S. Route 522 =

Highway in the United States

U.S. Route 522
- US 522 highlighted in red

Route information
- Auxiliary route of US 22
- Maintained by VDOT, WVDOH, MDSHA, and PennDOT
- Length: 308.59 mi (Note: Length is the sum of state mileages.) (496.63 km)
- Existed: 1926–present

Major junctions
- South end: US 60 / SR 1002 in Powhatan, VA
- I-64 near Gum Spring, VA; US 15 / US 29 in Culpeper, VA; US 340 in Front Royal, VA; I-66 near Front Royal, VA; I-81 / US 17 / US 50 in Winchester, VA; US 11 in Winchester, VA; I-68 / I-70 / US 40 in Hancock, MD; US 30 near McConnellsburg, PA; I-76 / Penna Turnpike in Fort Littleton, PA; US 22 / US 322 in Lewistown, PA
- North end: US 11 / US 15 in Selinsgrove, PA

Location
- Country: United States
- States: Virginia, West Virginia, Maryland, Pennsylvania
- Counties: VA: Powhatan, Goochland, Louisa, Spotsylvania, Orange, Culpeper, Rappahannock, Warren, Clarke, Frederick, City of Winchester; WV: Morgan; MD: Washington; PA: Fulton, Huntingdon, Mifflin, Snyder

Highway system
- United States Numbered Highway System; List; Special; Divided
← US 511	VA	→ I-564
← WV 501	WV	→ WV 527
← MD 521	MD	→ MD 524
← PA 519	PA	→ PA 523

U.S. Route 522 (US 522) is a spur route of US 22 in the states of Virginia, West Virginia, Maryland, and Pennsylvania. The U.S. Highway travels in a north-south direction, and runs 308.59 miles (496.63 km) from US 60 near Powhatan, Virginia, to its northern terminus at US 11 and US 15 near Selinsgrove, Pennsylvania. US 522 serves many small cities and towns in the Piedmont, Blue Ridge Mountains, and northern Shenandoah Valley of Virginia. The highway serves the Virginia communities of Goochland, Mineral, Culpeper, the town of Washington, and Front Royal and the independent city of Winchester. US 522 then follows the Ridge-and-Valley Appalachians north and then east through the Eastern Panhandle of West Virginia, a 2-mile-wide (3.2 km) stretch of Western Maryland, and South Central Pennsylvania to its terminus in the Susquehanna Valley. The highway serves Berkeley Springs, West Virginia; Hancock, Maryland; and the Pennsylvania communities of McConnellsburg, Mount Union, Lewistown, and Middleburg.

== Route description ==
Lengths
	mi	km
VA	159.26	256.30
WV	18.74	30.16
MD	2.35	3.78
PA	128.237	206.377
Total	308.59	496.63

US 522 contains several segments that are part of the National Highway System. The U.S. highway is part of the main system from Virginia State Route 37 (SR 37) near Winchester to Interstate 70 (I-70) at Warfordsburg, Pennsylvania. US 522 is also part of the main system from the Pennsylvania Turnpike (I-76) at Fort Littleton to Pennsylvania Route 35 (PA 35) at Shade Gap and from the south end of its concurrency with US 22 at Mount Union to its northern terminus near Selinsgrove. US 522 is a National Highway System principal arterial in four places in Virginia, including its concurrencies with SR 3 and US 15 Bus. in Culpeper, on its concurrency with US 211 between Sperryville and Massies Corner, from its southern junction with SR 55 to I-66 in Front Royal, and from the south end of its concurrency with US 11 in Winchester to SR 37 near Winchester. The highway is also a principal arterial from PA 35 at Shade Gap to US 22 at Mount Union. US 522's other junctions with highways part of the National Highway System along its 159.26-mile-long (256.30 km) course through Virginia include I-64 near Gum Spring; US 15 and US 29 in Culpeper; US 340 in Front Royal; and I-81, US 17, US 50, and SR 7 in Winchester. Other major junctions include one with West Virginia Route 9 (WV 9) in Berkeley Springs along its 18.74 miles (30.16 km) in West Virginia; I-68, I-70, and US 40 in Hancock during its 2.35-mile-long (3.78 km) streak across Maryland; and US 30 in McConnellsburg and US 22 and US 322 in Lewistown during its 128.237-mile-long (206.377 km) route through Pennsylvania.

=== Powhatan to Culpeper ===
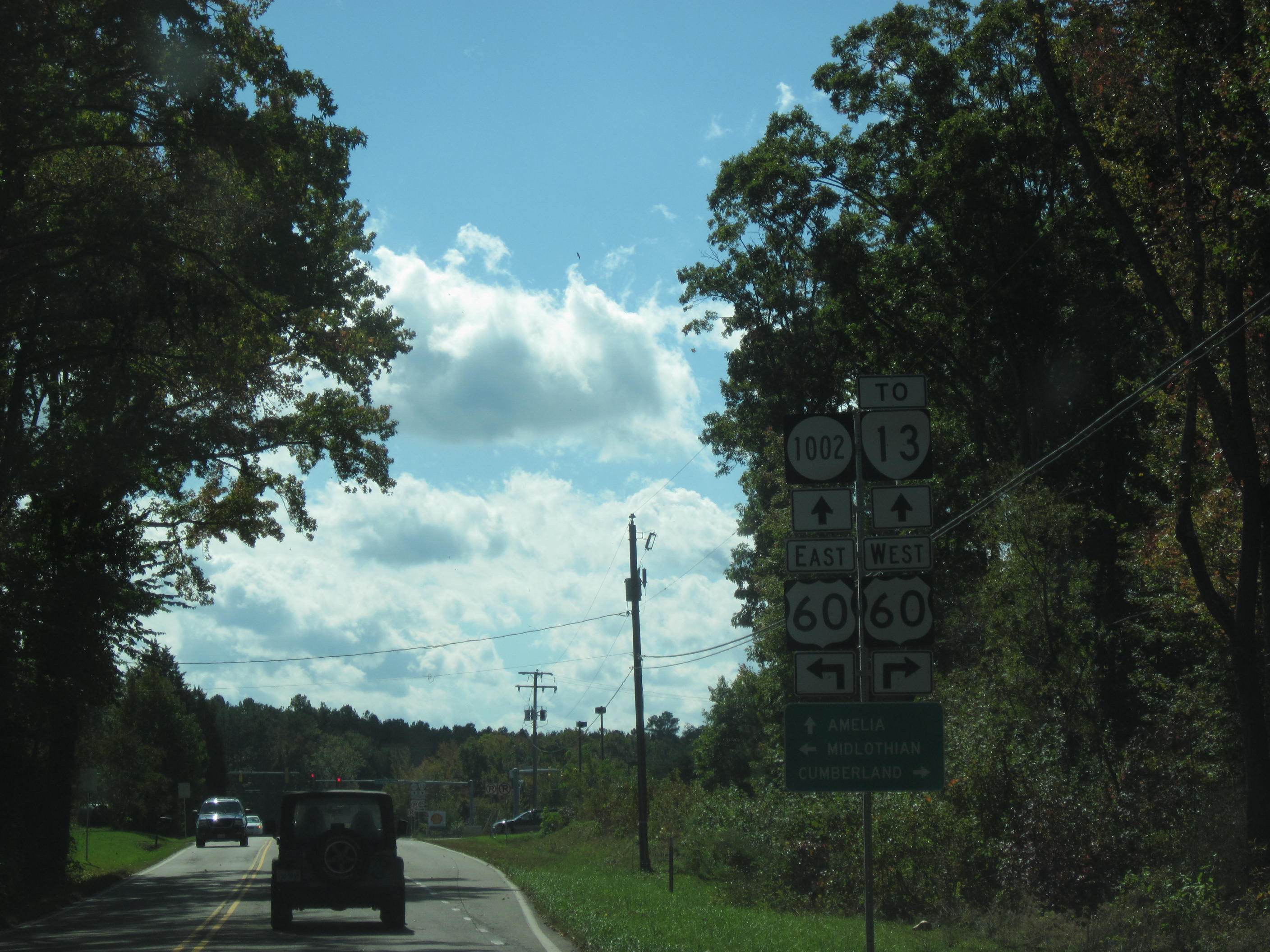
Approaching the southern terminus of US 522 at the intersection with US 60 and SR 1002 in Powhatan

US 522 begins at a four-legged intersection with US 60 (Anderson Highway) on the western edge of the unincorporated village of Powhatan, the county seat of Powhatan County. The roadway continues on the south side of the intersection as SR 1002 (Emmanuel Church Road), which passes the eponymous church before it connects with SR 13. US 522 heads north as Maidens Road, which heads through the community of Jefferson, the site of the historic home Elmington. North of Michaux, the highway meets the east end of SR 313 (Beaumont Road), which leads to the Beaumont Learning Center, before it crosses the William Walthall Michaux Bridge over the James River into Goochland County. US 522 crosses over CSX's James River Subdivision rail line and joins SR 6 (River Road) at Maidens. The two highways meet the east end of SR 329, which leads to the Virginia Correctional Center for Women, opposite the historic home Brightly. US 522 and SR 6 continue through Goochland, where the highways pass the Goochland County Court Square. The highways meet the west end of SR 396 (Dickenson Road), which leads to the Goochland campus of J. Sargeant Reynolds Community College, before the two highways diverge at the north end of the county seat.

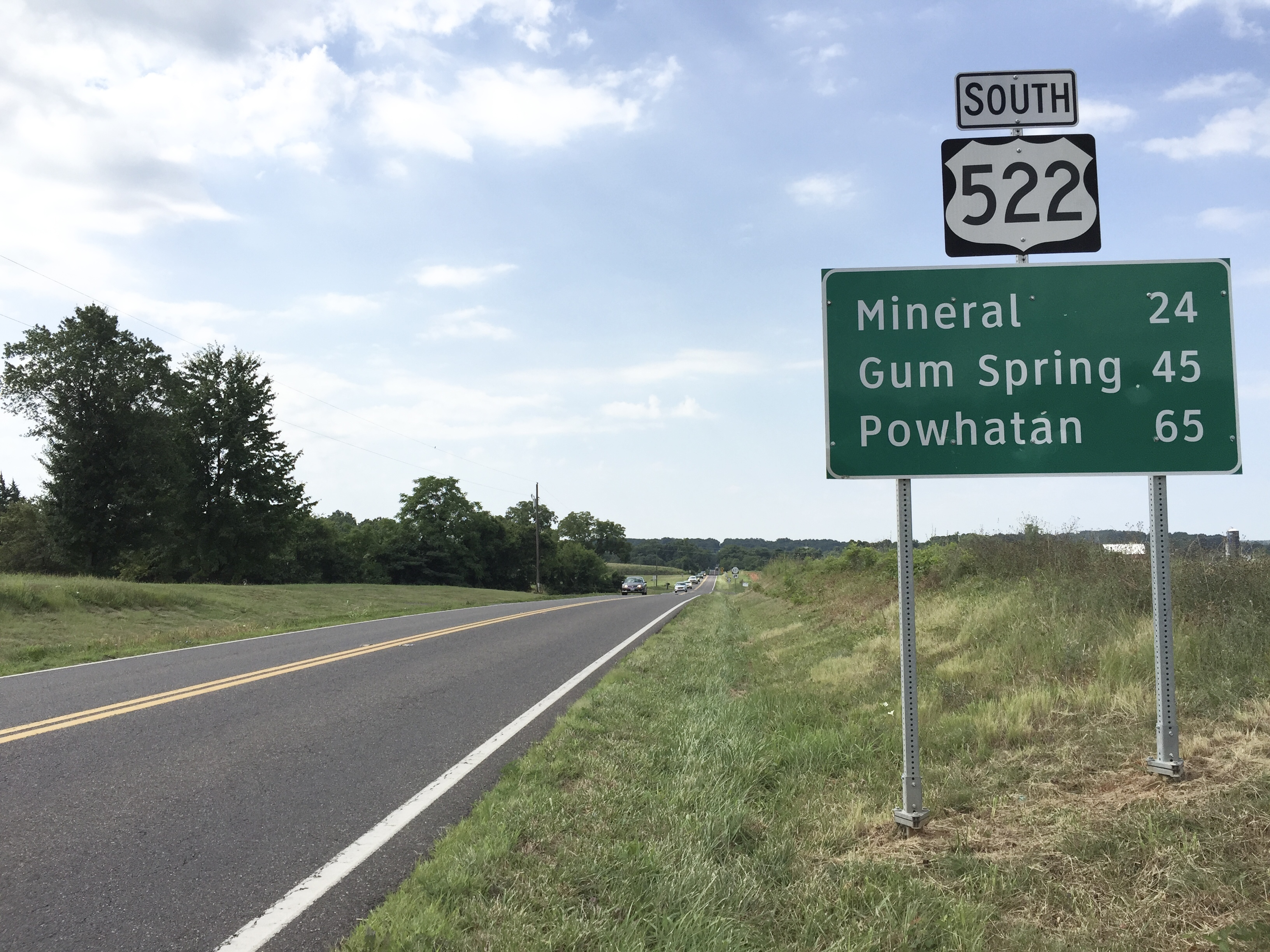
View south along US 522 in Orange County

US 522 continues north on Sandy Hook Road, which passes through the eponymous hamlet before entering Louisa County at the village of Gum Spring. There, the U.S. Highway intersects US 250 (Broad Street Road) and has a diamond interchange with I-64. US 522 continues on Cross County Road, which passes through Shelfar and Orchid and crosses the South Anna River at Southanna. The route continues through Apple Grove to Cuckoo, where the highway joins US 33 (Jefferson Highway) in front of the eponymous historic estate. After a brief concurrency with US 33, US 522 splits north onto Pendleton Road through Pendleton, where the highway parallels CSX's Piedmont Subdivision rail line into the town of Mineral, where the route follows Mineral Avenue and passes through its namesake historic district. At the intersection of Mineral Avenue and First Street, US 522 meets SR 208 and SR 22, the latter of which has its eastern terminus at the intersection. SR 208 and SR 22 head north and west on Mineral Avenue toward the county seat of Louisa; US 522 and SR 208 turn east onto First Street, intersect the rail line at grade, and turn north onto Louisa Avenue.

US 522 and SR 208 follow Zachary Taylor Highway away from Mineral. North of Contrary Creek, the two routes diverge at Wares Crossroads. SR 208 splits east onto New Bridge Road toward Spotsylvania Courthouse, and US 522 continues northwest along the presidential-named highway. The U.S. Highway crosses the mainstem of Lake Anna, the North Anna River, to cross the western corner of Spotsylvania County. US 522 crosses Pamunkey Creek as it enters Orange County. After leaving the Lake Anna area, the U.S. Highway heads straight north to Unionville, where the route intersects SR 20 (Constitution Highway). US 522 crosses Mill Run and Mountain Run and follows Raccoon Branch as the route curves northwest and crosses the Rapidan River into Culpeper County. At Winston, US 522 curves northeast and joins Rapidan Road on a tangent and begins to parallel Norfolk Southern Railway's Washington District rail line. The U.S. Highway veers away from the rail line, crosses Sumerduck Creek, and expands to a four-lane divided highway as passes the National Audio-Visual Conservation Center and approaches Germanna Highway, which carries SR 3, southeast of Culpeper.

=== Culpeper to Front Royal ===
US 522 and SR 3 head northwest along four-lane divided Germanna Highway. The highways meet US 15 and US 29 (James Madison Highway) at a diamond interchange and enter the town of Culpeper, where the divided highway narrows to a two-lane road and crosses over the Norfolk Southern rail line. SR 3 has its western terminus at Orange Road, which heads south carrying US 15 Bus.; US 15 Bus. joins US 522 on Germanna Highway west one block to US 29 Bus., where US 522 and US 15 Bus. turn north and join US 29 Bus. on Main Street. The three highways pass by the historic Burgandine House, at Main Street's oblique intersection with Orange Road, and to the west of the South East Street Historic District, which contains the Hill Mansion and Culpeper National Cemetery. The U.S. Highway and the two business routes continue through the Culpeper Historic District, where they pass the Pitts Theatre, the A. P. Hill Boyhood Home, and the Lord Culpeper Hotel and pass to the west of the Culpeper railroad station. North of downtown, US 522 diverges from US 15 Bus. and US 29 Bus. when it turns west onto Evans Street, which crosses Mountain Run and passes Fairview Cemetery on its way out of the town of Culpeper.

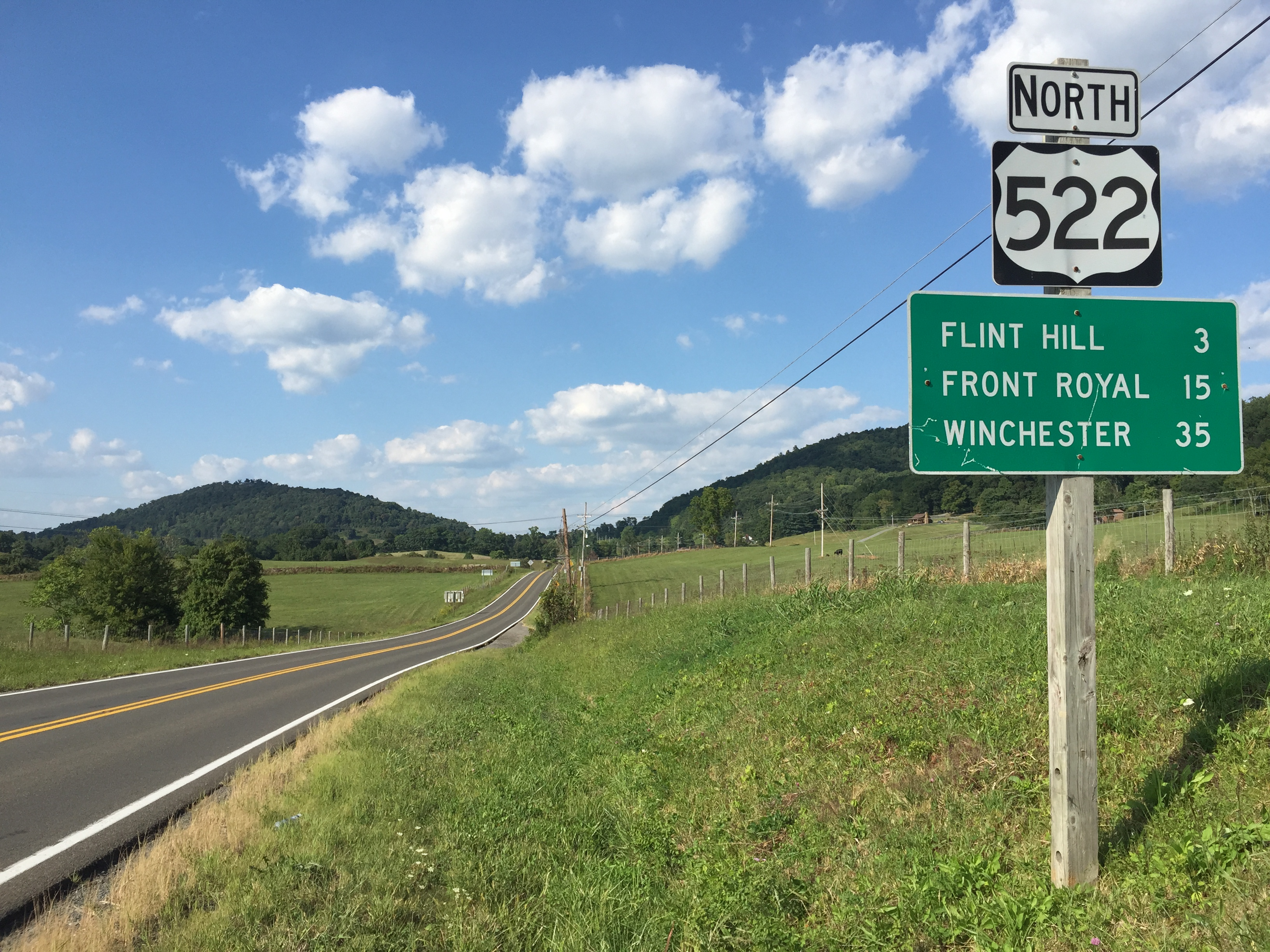
View north along US 522 at US 211 in Rappahannock County

US 522 heads northwest into the foothills of the Blue Ridge in western Culpeper County as Sperryville Pike. The U.S. highway passes through the hamlets of Norman and Griffinsburg and crosses Devils Run and the Hazel River south of their confluence. US 522 passes through the village of Boston, the site of the historic home Elmwood, before it enters Rappahannock County. The highway crosses Blackwater Creek between Round Hill and Scrabble and follows the stream through the gap between Butler Mountain and Bessie Bell Mountain to Woodville. US 522 crosses White Walnut Run and Beaverdam Creek south of its junction with SR 231 (F.T. Valley Road). The U.S. Highway continues to Sperryville, where the highway passes through the village's namesake historic district. US 522 crosses the Thornton River immediately before its junction with US 211 (Lee Highway) east of US 211's ascent of the Blue Ridge and access to Shenandoah National Park at Thornton Gap.

US 522 runs concurrently with US 211 northeast along four-lane divided Lee Highway. The routes cross the Piney River near Sperryville and the Covington River at Rediviva. South of the Rappahannock county seat of Washington, US 211 Bus. and unsigned US 522 Bus. split north onto Main Street to serve the county seat directly. The mainline U.S. Highways pass southeast of the town and reconnect with the entirely concurrent business routes, which exit town on Warren Street, next to the Calvert Mill. US 522 and US 211 cross Battle Run just west of Massies Corner, where US 211 continues east toward Warrenton while US 522 heads north on two-lane Zachary Taylor Highway. US 522 passes through Flint Hill, site of the eponymous Baptist church. The highway crosses the Jordan River and three of its tributaries—Wilson Branch, Hittles Mill Stream, and Indian Run—between Flint Hill and Huntly. From Huntly, US 522 ascends the Blue Ridge to Chester Gap, where the highway intersects the Appalachian Trail next to the headwaters of the Rappahannock River and the Rappahannock–Warren–Fauquier county tripoint.

=== Front Royal to Winchester ===
US 522 enters Warren County and descends to the town of Front Royal along Remount Road, which passes the historic Mountain Home along its descent along Happy Creek. The U.S. Highway expands to a four-lane divided highway and its name changes to Commerce Avenue at SR 55, which heads west along South Street and east as John Marshall Highway. US 522 passes to the east of the Front Royal Historic District. In the northern part of the town, the highway curves west to Commerce Avenue's terminus at Royal Avenue, which carries US 340 and SR 55. The three highways follow four-lane Royal Avenue north to a right-angle curve where the three routes curve onto 14th Street and then turn north onto four-lane divided Shenandoah Street. US 522, US 340, and SR 55 cross Norfolk Southern's Hagerstown District rail line and the South Fork Shenandoah River into the Riverton area of Front Royal, where SR 55 splits to the west onto Strasburg Road. The two U.S. Highways then cross the North Fork Shenandoah River and Norfolk Southern Railway's B-Line just west of the confluence of the two Shenandoah River forks. US 522 and US 340 cross Crooked Run and have a partial cloverleaf interchange with I-66 as they leave the town of Front Royal.

US 522 and US 340 head north along four-lane divided Winchester Road. The highways pass through Cedarville, the site of the Virginia Inland Port, and through Nineveh, the site of the historic estate Erin. North of Nineveh, the routes follow the Warren–Frederick county line and briefly enter Clarke County, where the road is named Stonewall Jackson Highway. US 522 and US 340 diverge at a four-legged intersection at Double Tollgate. US 340 heads east along Lord Fairfax Highway; the west leg of the junction is SR 277 (Fairfax Pike), which heads toward Stephens City. US 522 continues into Frederick County as Front Royal Pike, which passes through Armel at Wrights Run and Parkins Mills at Opequon Creek. The highway passes to the west of Winchester Regional Airport before reaching Millwood Pike, which carries US 17 and US 50. The north leg of the junction is the ramps to and from northbound I-81. US 522 turns west onto Millwood Pike, and the three U.S. Highways enter the independent city of Winchester within the southbound side of the partial cloverleaf interchange.

US 522, US 17, and US 50 follow four-lane divided Millwood Avenue along the south side of the campus of Shenandoah University. West of Abrams Creek, the four-lane divided highway continues west as Jubal Early Drive; the three U.S. Highways turn northwest onto a two-lane continuation of Millwood Avenue. The routes cross Town Run and have an oblique grade crossing of CSX's Shenandoah Subdivision rail line. At Gerrard Street, which carries US 11, all four U.S. Highways turn north onto two-lane Cameron Street. US 522, US 11, US 17, and US 50 head north into the Winchester Historic District. At Cork Street, US 17 reaches its northern terminus and US 50 turns west. US 522 and US 11 continue north along the east edge of the downtown area. North of downtown, US 11 and US 522 diverge when the latter highway turns west onto Commercial Street. US 522 intersects the Winchester and Western Railroad immediately before it turns north onto Fairmount Avenue, which the highway follows out of the city of Winchester and back into Frederick County.

=== Winchester to Hancock ===
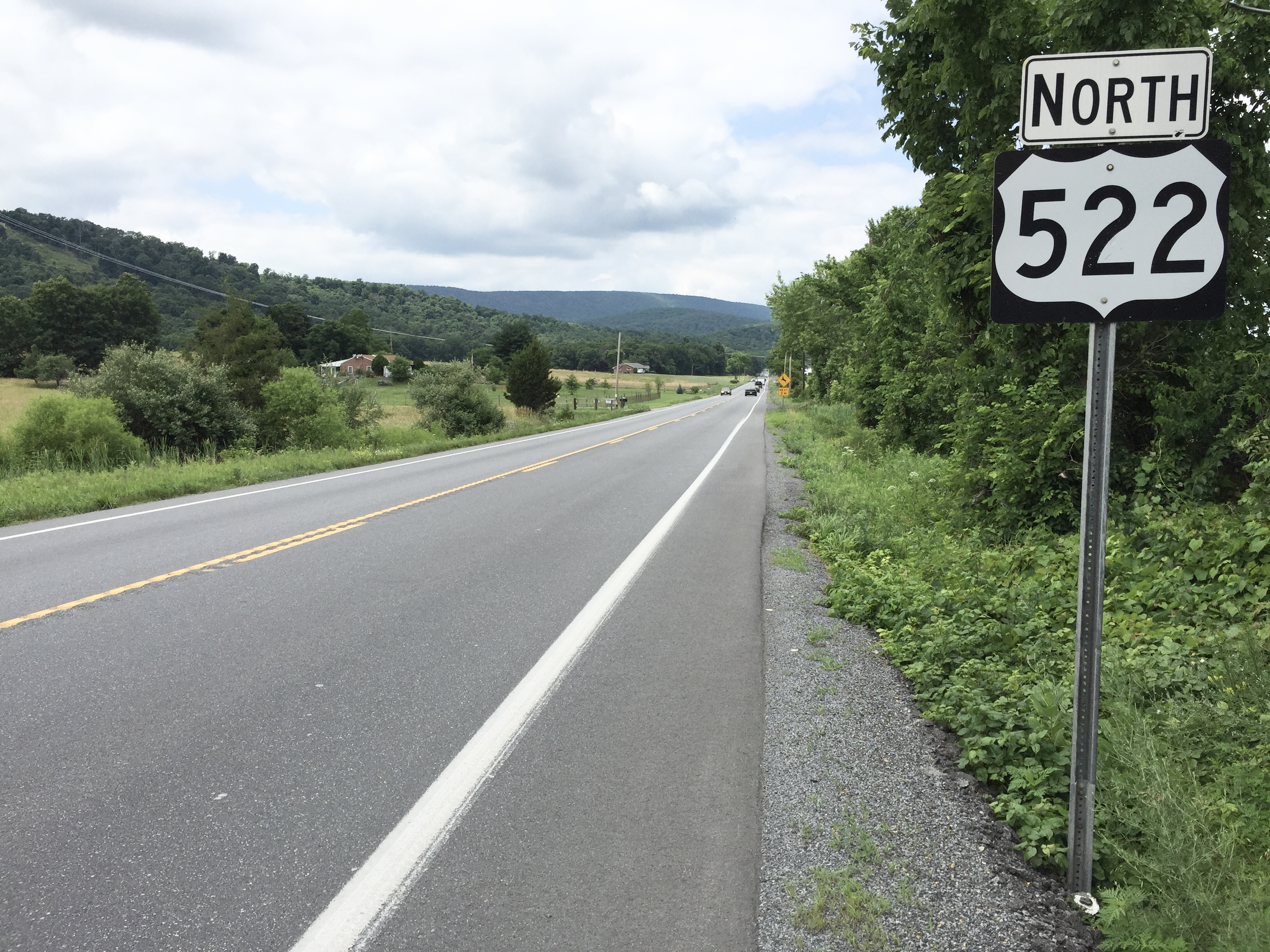
View north along US 522 just after entering West Virginia from Virginia near Ridge

US 522 curves northwest and expands to a four-lane divided highway as North Frederick Pike at it leaves Winchester to a diamond interchange with SR 37 (Winchester Bypass). The highway passes by Albin and Nain, between which the route crosses North Mountain and crosses Babbs Run east of Hunting Ridge. The route crosses Hogue Creek and Back Creek on either side of Gainesboro, where the route briefly parallels the Winchester and Western Railroad. US 522 crosses Isaacs Creek and Little Isaacs Creek on either side of Cross Junction, north of which the highway meets the east end of SR 127 (Bloomery Pike). The highway passes through Reynolds Store, crosses Timber Ridge, and descends into the valley of Sleepy Creek before reaching the Virginia–West Virginia state line near the northernmost point in Virginia.

Just after entering Morgan County, West Virginia, US 522 reduces from a four-lane divided highway to a two-lane undivided road, Valley Road, which follows the east flank of Warm Spring Ridge north. The highway crosses Breakneck Run and passes a fish hatchery at Ridge, passes the entrance to Cacapon Resort State Park at Omps, and crosses Rock Gap Run at Rock Gap. US 522 passes by the headwaters of Warm Spring Run and follows the stream through Berryville to the town of Berkeley Springs, the county seat of Morgan County. The highway enters town on Washington Street and intersects Martinsburg Road, from which the highway runs concurrently through the Town of Bath Historic District with WV 9. In the center of town, US 522 and WV 9 pass by Berkeley Springs State Park and the Morgan County Courthouse. In the northern part of town, WV 9 splits west onto Union Street to cross Warm Spring Ridge, and the U.S. Highway continues north and passes the historic Berkeley Springs Train Depot. US 522 heads north from Berkeley Springs on Hancock Road, which parallels Warm Spring Run and a CSX rail spur through North Berkeley, Jimtown, and Burnt Factory. North of Burnt Factory, the highway descends into the narrow valley of the Potomac River; southbound US 522 has a climbing lane.

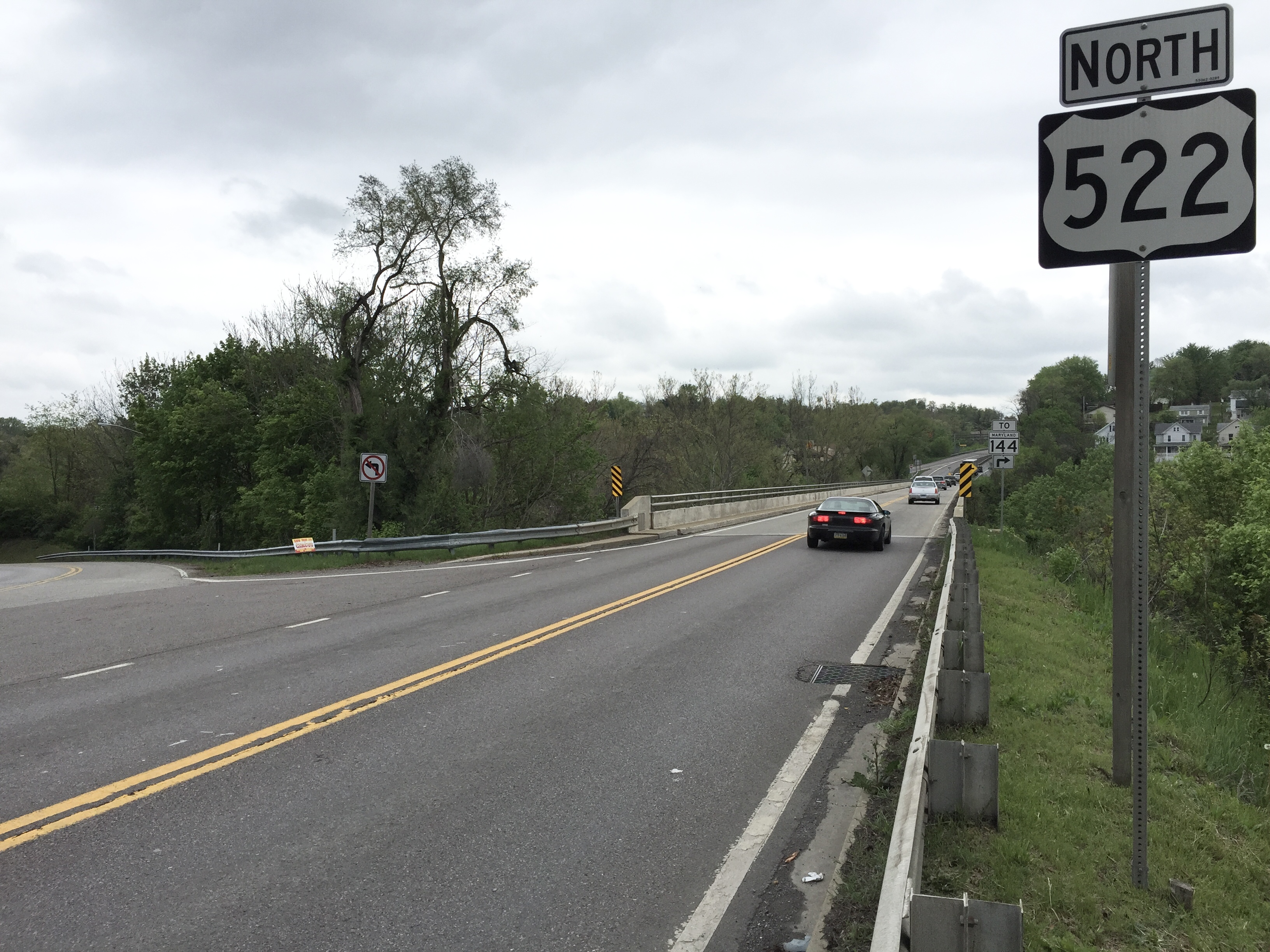
View north along US 522 in Hancock

US 522's bridge across the Potomac River begins just north of River Road; the highway crosses over CSX's Cumberland Subdivision's Hancock rail yard and, on the bridge itself, has its last junction in West Virginia, with Airport Road, which leads to Potomac Airpark in the West Virginia hamlet of Hancock. The bridge crosses into Washington County, Maryland and the town of Hancock at a narrow channel of the Potomac, crosses an island, then crosses the main channel of the river, Chesapeake and Ohio Canal National Historical Park, Berm Road, the Western Maryland Rail Trail, and South Street before the bridge lands on the Maryland side of the river. US 522, named Warfordsburg Road, meets a two-way ramp from Maryland Route 144 (Main Street) before the highway bridges MD 144, Little Tonoloway Creek, and Limestone Road, which is MD 894. US 522 becomes a divided highway just south of its right-in/right-out junction with High Street, which leads to MD 144 via Virginia Avenue. Southbound US 522 has an exit ramp to Limestone Road used to access MD 144. US 522 meets I-70 and US 40 (Eisenhower Memorial Highway) at a three-level directional-T interchange where US 522 becomes concurrent with the two highways. Immediately to the north, I-70 and US 522 meet the eastern terminus of I-68 (National Freeway) at another three-level directional interchange, where westbound US 40 leaves I-70 and goes onto I-68. Southbound US 522 exits I-70 via a left exit prior to US 40 joining eastbound I-70, so southbound US 522 does not have a concurrency with US 40. I-70 and US 522 continue north as a four-lane freeway that leaves the town of Hancock and crosses the Maryland–Pennsylvania state line.

=== Hancock to Mount Union ===
US 522 enters Pennsylvania concurrent with I-70 (Eisenhower Memorial Highway) in Bethel Township in Fulton County. The Interstate and the U.S. Highway split in Warfordsburg at Exit 168, a diamond interchange where I-70 curves northwest toward Breezewood while US 522 heads north on Great Cove Road. Great Cove Road continues a short distance west of the interchange to PA 484 (Buck Valley Road). US 522 crosses Little Tonoloway Creek at Great Cove and passes through a gap in Tonoloway Ridge on its way to a junction with PA 643 (Flickersville Road) in the hamlet of Dott. The U.S. highway continues northeast around the northern edge of Tonoloway Ridge at the Belfast Township village of Needmore, where the highway has a brief concurrency with PA 655, which heads south as Thompson Road and north as Pleasant Valley Road. US 522 curves to the east, crosses Tonoloway Creek, ascends Timber Ridge, and descends the ridge to cross Licking Creek at Gem. The U.S. highway climbs over Scrub Ridge and curves to the northeast at the village of Big Cove Tannery in Ayr Township, where the highway intersects PA 928 (Big Cove Tannery Road) and crosses Big Cove Creek.

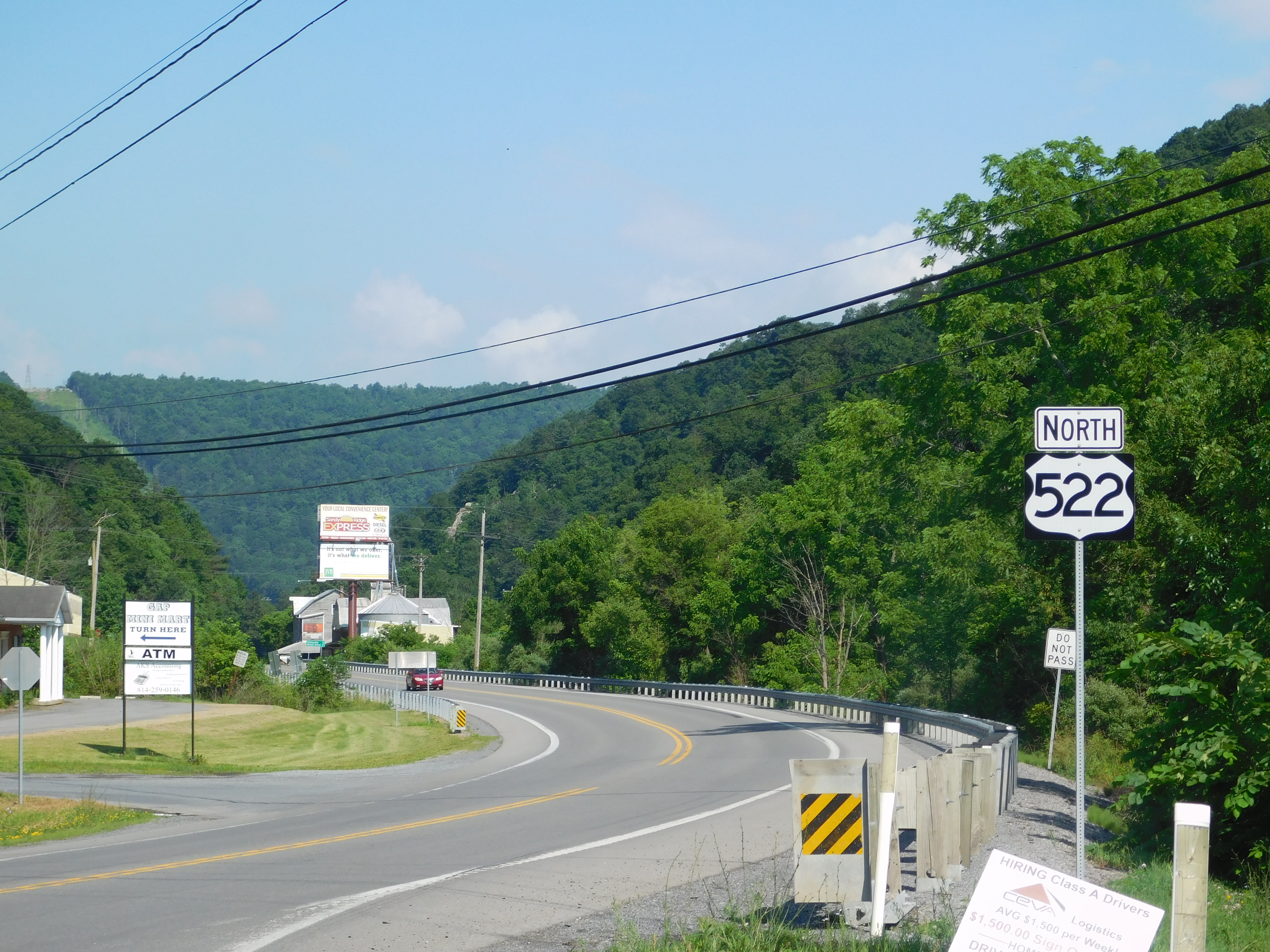
US 522 northbound in Dublin Township near Shade Gap

US 522 passes around the northern end of Dickeys Mountain and enters the broad valley of Big Cove Creek between Meadow Grounds Mountain to the west and Tuscarora Mountain to the east. Near the northern end of the valley, the highway passes through the borough of McConnellsburg. US 522 follows Second Street through the county seat, which passes by the Fulton House and through the McConnellsburg Historic District. In the center of the borough, the U.S. Highway intersects Lincoln Way, which heads east as PA 16; Lincoln Way was part of the original Lincoln Highway. Past this intersection, the road passes by the Fulton County Courthouse. US 522 heads north out of the borough into Todd Township, once again named Great Cove Road, and meets US 30 (Lincoln Highway) at a diamond interchange. The highway heads by the headwaters of Cove Creek and through the narrow valley between Little Scrub Ridge to the west and Cove Mountain to the east. At Knobsville, the U.S. Highway follows Licking Creek through a gap in the former mountain into Dublin Township, where the highway intersects PA 475 (Waterfall Road) and meets I-76 (Pennsylvania Turnpike) at Exit 180, the Fort Littleton interchange. US 522 parallels the turnpike through the valley of Little Aughwick Creek northeast through Fort Littleton to the village of Burnt Cabins, Pennsylvania just north of Sidneys Knob. Here the U.S. Highway turns north into Huntingdon County.

US 522 heads north as Croghan Pike through Dublin Township on the east side of Shade Mountain. After intersecting PA 35 and PA 641 (Neelyton Road) in the village of Shade Gap, the U.S. Highway follows Shade Creek by the Shade Gap Feed and Flour Mill and through a gap in Shade Mountain into the Locke Valley in Cromwell Township. US 522 follows Shade Creek north, passing by the St. Mary's Covered Bridge, to Blacklog, then the highway curves west and follows Blacklog Creek through a gap in Blacklog Mountain. The highway becomes Ridgely Street in the borough of Orbisonia, where the highway intersects PA 994 (Elliot Street). US 522 parallels the East Broad Top Railroad and Aughwick Creek north into Shirley Township. The highway passes through the borough of Shirleysburg, crosses Aughwick Creek and the East Broad Top Railroad, and passes by the village of Aughwick Mills, where the route diverges from the creek. US 522 continues along the railroad to Allenport, where the highway meets the southern end of PA 103. The highway parallels the Juniata River north along the eastern edge of the borough of Mount Union. US 522 passes under Water Street and Norfolk Southern Railway's Pittsburgh Line (the former Main Line of the Pennsylvania Railroad) before crossing the river to an intersection with US 22 (William Penn Highway) in Mifflin County.

=== Mount Union to Selinsgrove ===
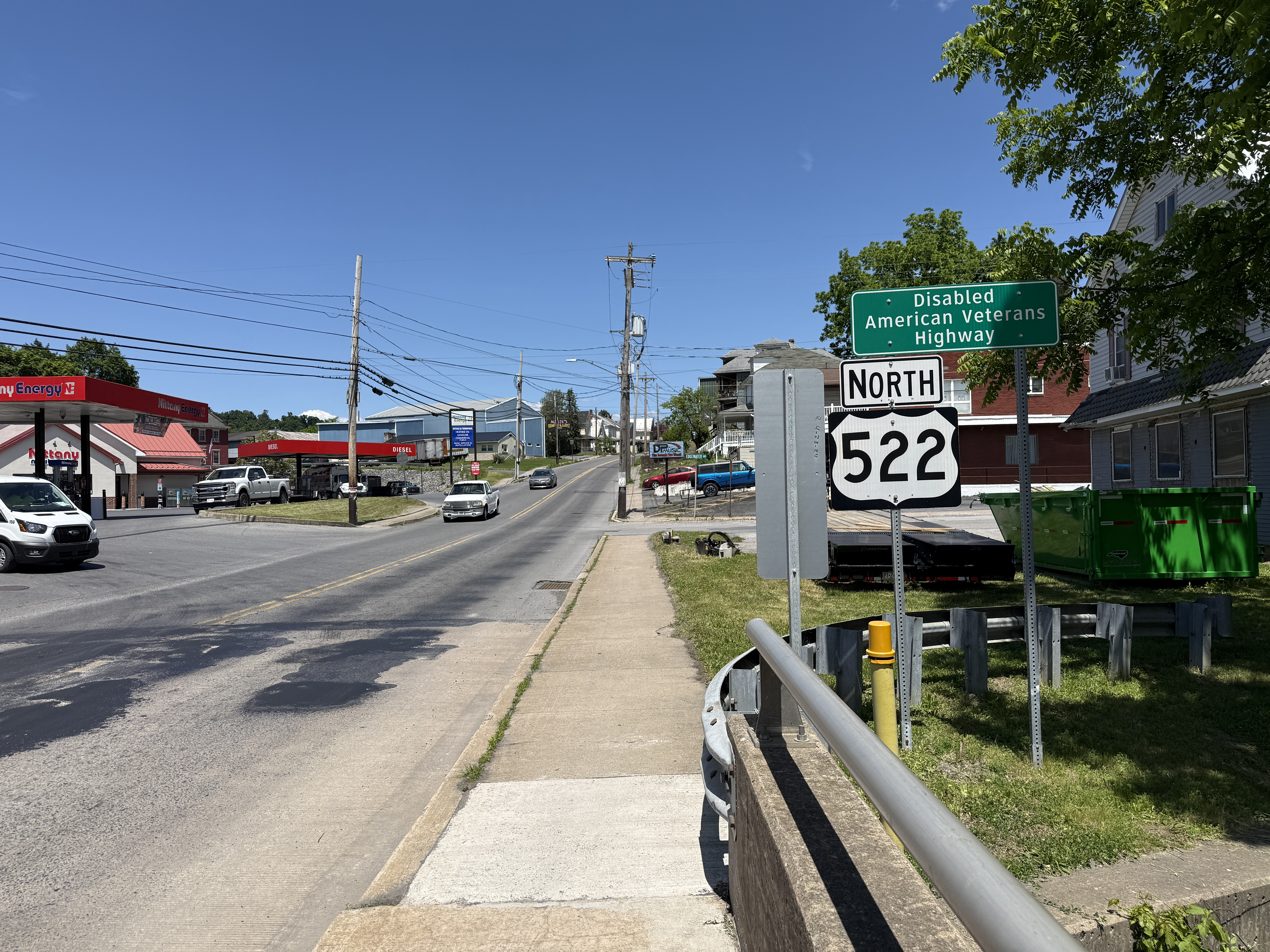
US 522 northbound past US 22/US 322 in Lewistown

US 522 joins US 22 in a concurrency that heads northeast between Jacks Mountain to the northwest and the Juniata River to the southeast. The two highways follow Long Hollow Creek north through Wayne Township to Atkinson Mills, where the routes cross Beaverdam Run and enter the valley of Musser Run. US 522 and US 22 follow Musser Run into Oliver Township to the borough of McVeytown, north of which the highways briefly follow the Juniata River. The U.S. Highways cross Wakefield Run and cross Strodes Run at Strodes Mills into Granville Township. There, US 522 and US 22 expand to a four-lane freeway, the Vietnam Veterans Memorial Highway. US 22 Bus. splits from the mainline highways at a trumpet interchange, and the two U.S. Highways pass to the north side of Big Ridge opposite the business route. Shortly after entering Derry Township, US 522 and US 22 meet US 322 (28th Division Highway) at a directional-T interchange. The interchange includes partial cloverleaf interchange ramps with Ort Valley Road and the main street of unincorporated Highland Park, Electric Avenue.

US 522, US 22, and US 322 run concurrently south along Kishacoquillas Creek into the borough of Lewistown. East of downtown, US 522 diverges from the other two U.S. Highways, which continue along the freeway southeast toward Harrisburg. Westbound US 22 and US 322 interact with US 522 via a half diamond interchange; access between the southbound U.S. Highways and US 522 is via Logan Street and Walnut Street. Two-lane US 522 crosses Kishacoquillas Creek, leaves Lewistown, and passes the Lewistown Armory. The route continues northeast through Derry Township in the valley of Jacks Creek between Jacks Mountain to the north and Shade Mountain to the south, a valley that has several short ridges itself. US 522 passes the Old Hoopes School north of Maitland. The U.S. Highway continues into Decatur Township, where the route crosses Meadow Creek at Alfarata, Jacks Creek at Soradoville, and Wagner Run at Wagner.

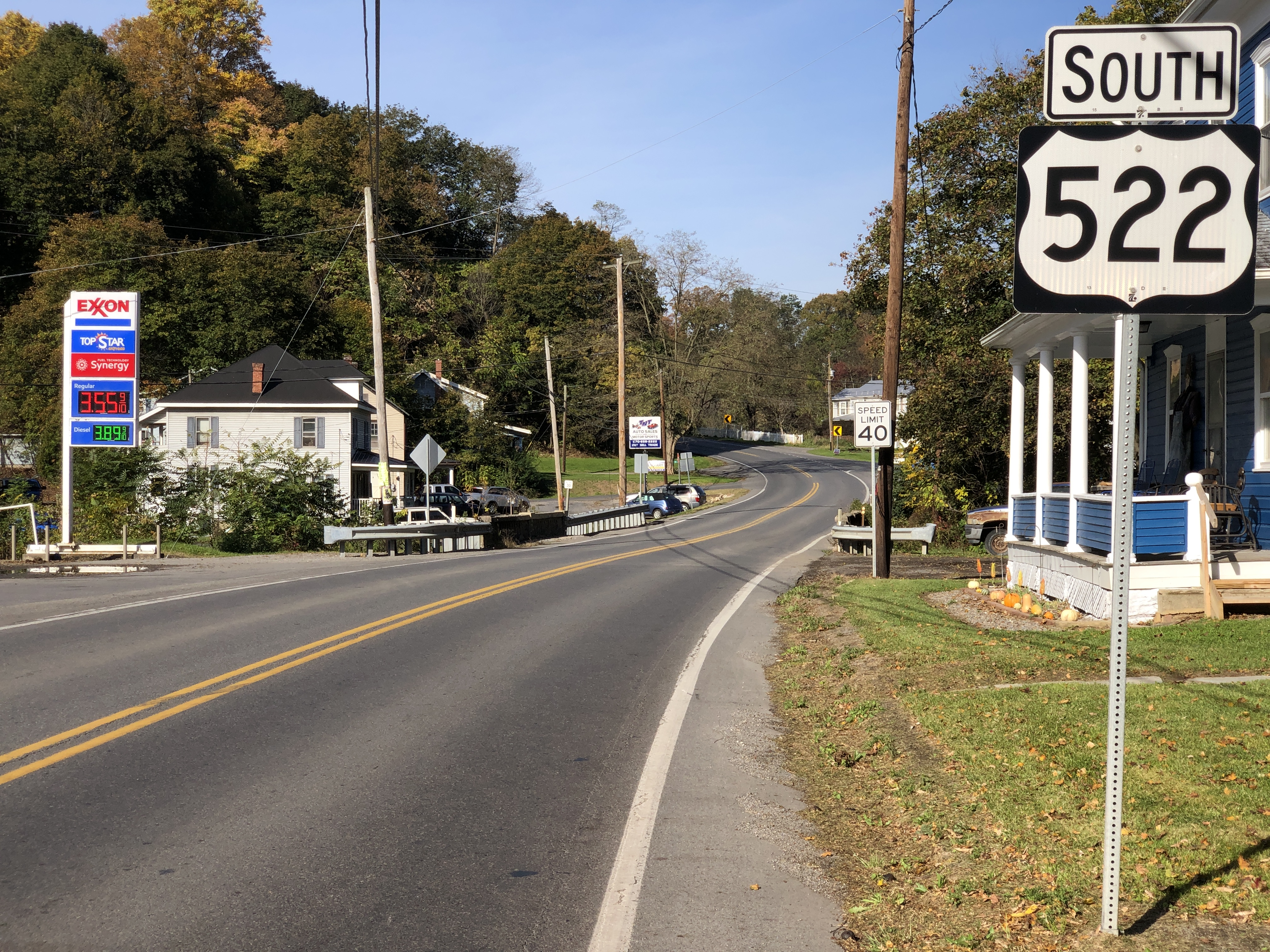
US 522 southbound in McClure

US 522 continues into Snyder County, where the route passes through the valley of Middle Creek. The highway immediately passes through the West Beaver Township borough of McClure, where the highway follows the South Branch of Middle Creek through a gap in a short ridge and follows Beaver Creek from its headwaters. US 522 follows that creek into Spring Township to Beaver Springs, where the U.S. Highway runs concurrently with PA 235. The highway crosses Beaver Township and through the borough of Beavertown, through which the route follows Market Street. US 522 crosses Middle Creek shortly after entering Franklin Township and passes through the county seat of Middleburg along Market Street and Main Street. Part of the route's course on Main Street is a concurrency with PA 104, with which the highway crosses Middle Creek a second time. US 522 crosses the creek for the last time in the Middle Creek Township community of Kreamer. The U.S. Highway enters Penn Township and passes through the northern fringe of the borough of Selinsgrove, where the route meets the southern end of PA 204. US 522 leaves Selinsgrove at its intersection with the north end of Market Street. The U.S. Highway veers northeast and crosses Penns Creek on a truss bridge into Monroe Township. US 522 expands to a four-lane divided highway named Susquehanna Trail and passes to the south of Penn Valley Airport before reaching its northern terminus at a partially completed, partial cloverleaf interchange with US 11 and US 15, which head south on the Selinsgrove Bypass and north along Susquehanna Trail, a short distance west of the Susquehanna River.

== History ==
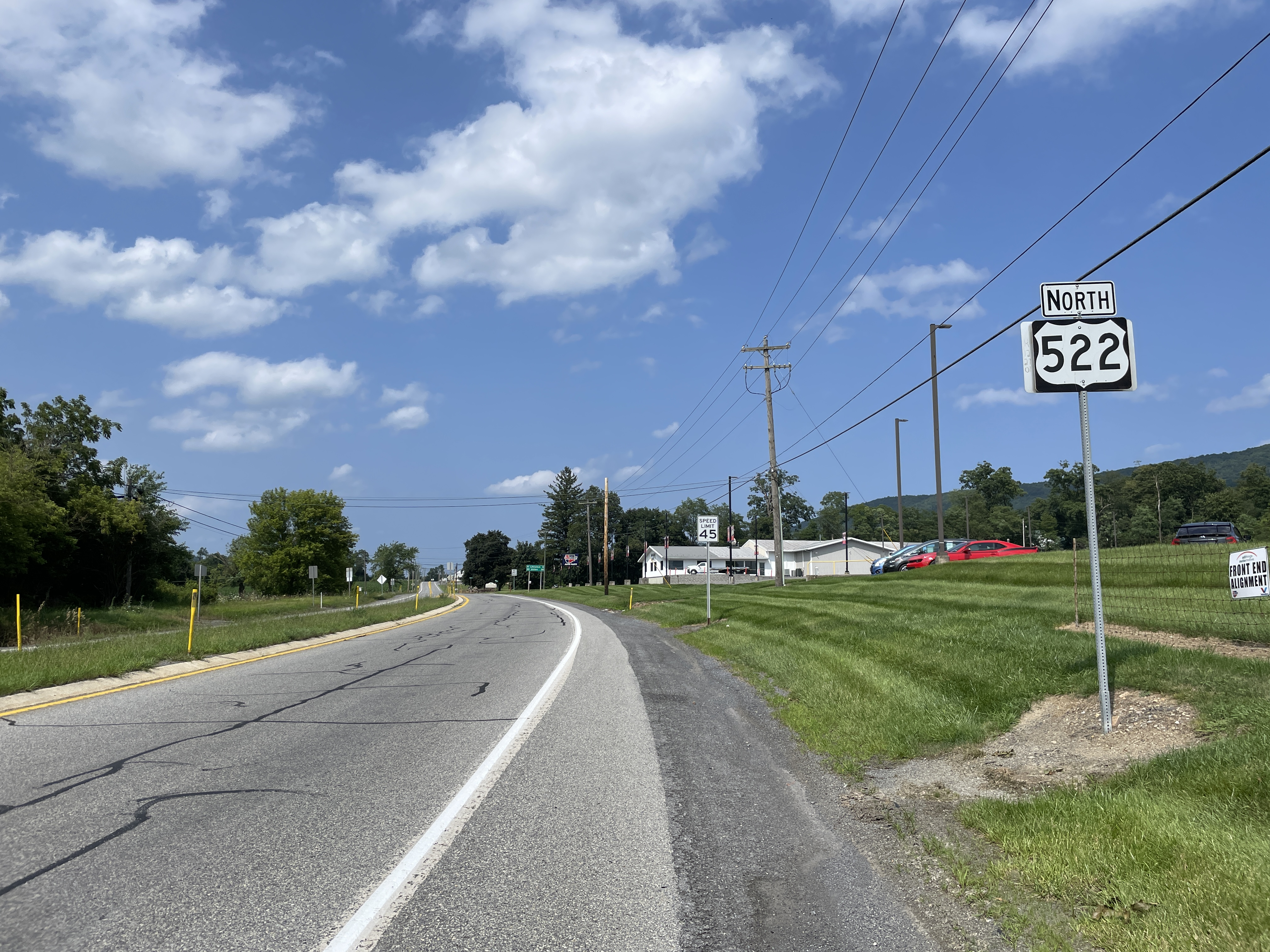
US 522 northbound past US 30 near McConnellsburg, Pennsylvania

US 522 was created in 1926 and signed from Lewistown to Selinsgrove in Pennsylvania. A year later, US 522 was extended south to Hancock, Maryland, along its current alignment. The portion from U.S. Route 40 in Hancock to U.S. Route 22 in Mount Union, Pennsylvania, was previously U.S. Route 622 from 1926 to 1927. The designation, shown on the 1926 U.S. Highway System plan, may not have been signed.

Through Maryland, Warfordsburg Road from Main Street at the west end of Hancock north to the Pennsylvania state line was paved in 1920. When the first number designations in the U.S. Highway System were released in 1926, US 622 was proposed for the highway between Hancock and Mount Union, Pennsylvania. Another proposed number for the highway may have been US 11W, which appears marked on Warfordsburg Road on official Maryland maps in 1927 and 1928. By 1930, the highway was marked as US 522. The March 1936 flooding of the Potomac River destroyed the pre-existing bridge over the river at Church Street. A temporary timber trestle was constructed while a new bridge was planned at the western edge of the town of Hancock. The new bridge and approach roads were completed in 1939. US 522 was extended south of Hancock by 1946. US 522 was moved from Warfordsburg Road to a concurrency with I-70 when the Interstate highway and the associated directional interchanges were completed in 1965.

== Future ==
The West Virginia Division of Highways (WVDOH) has now selected a Preferred Alternative for the US 522 project. In general terms, the route runs parallel to—and east of—the existing Route 522 for approximately 22 miles (35 km) from the Maryland state line to the Virginia state line. It will be, for most of its length, within 50 feet (15 m) of the current 522. In the vicinity of the proposed Ridge Historic District, however, the alignment extends farther away to avoid impacting either that site or the adjacent fish hatchery. Also, immediately south of Berkeley Springs, the projected route would veer further east to avoid the downtown area.

== Major intersections ==
State	County	Location	mi	km	Destinations	Notes
Virginia	Powhatan	Powhatan	0.00	0.00	US 60 (Anderson Highway) / SR 1002 (Emmanuel Church Road) to SR 13 – Amelia, Midlothian, Cumberland	Southern terminus
Virginia	Powhatan	Michaux	8.34	13.42	SR 313 (Beaumont Road) – Beaumont Learning Center	
Virginia	James River		8.82	14.19	William Walthall Michaux Bridge	
Virginia	Goochland	Maidens	9.20	14.81	SR 6 east (River Road) – Richmond	Southern end of SR 6 overlap
Virginia	Goochland	Maidens	9.74	15.68	SR 329 – Virginia Correctional Center for Women	
Virginia	Goochland	Goochland	10.82	17.41	SR 396 (Dickenson Road) – J. Sargeant Reynolds Community College	
Virginia	Goochland	Goochland	10.94	17.61	SR 6 west (River Road West) – Scottsville	Northern end of SR 6 overlap
Virginia	Louisa	Gum Spring	17.53	28.21	US 250 (Broad Street Road)	
Virginia	Louisa		18.05	29.05	I-64 – Charlottesville, Richmond	I-64 exit 159
Virginia	Louisa	Cuckoo	32.89	52.93	US 33 east (Jefferson Highway) – Richmond	Southern end of US 33 overlap
Virginia	Louisa		33.55	53.99	US 33 west (Jefferson Highway) – Louisa, Harrisonburg	Northern end of US 33 overlap
Virginia	Louisa	Mineral	37.40	60.19	SR 22 west / SR 208 west (Mineral Avenue) – Louisa, Ferncliff	Southern end of SR 208 overlap
Virginia	Louisa	Wares Crossroads	42.83	68.93	SR 208 east – Spotsylvania, Lake Anna State Park	Northern end of SR 208 overlap
Virginia	Spotsylvania	No major junctions				
Virginia	Orange	Unionville	57.37	92.33	SR 20 (Constitution Highway) – Orange, Wilderness	
Virginia	Culpeper		71.49	115.05	SR 3 east (Germanna Highway) – Fredericksburg	Southern end of SR 3 overlap
Virginia	Culpeper	Culpeper	72.15	116.11	US 15 / US 29 (James Madison Highway) – Charlottesville, Washington	Diamond interchange
Virginia	Culpeper	Culpeper	73.11	117.66	US 15 Bus. south (Orange Road) – Orange	Southern end of US 15 Bus. overlap
Virginia	Culpeper	Culpeper	73.23	117.85	US 29 Bus. south (Madison Road) – Charlottesville	Southern end of US 29 Bus. overlap
Virginia	Culpeper	Culpeper	74.08	119.22	US 15 Bus. / US 29 Bus. north (Main Street)	Northern end of US 15 Bus. / US 29 Bus. overlap
Virginia	Rappahannock		92.56	148.96	SR 231 south (F.T. Valley Road) – Madison, Gordonsville, Syria, Graves Mountain	
Virginia	Rappahannock	Sperryville	93.33	150.20	US 211 west (Lee Highway) – New Market, Skyline Drive, Luray, Shenandoah National Park, Luray Caverns	Southern end of US 211 overlap
Virginia	Rappahannock		97.95	157.64	US 211 Bus. east (Main Street) – Washington, VA	
Virginia	Rappahannock		99.04	159.39	US 211 Bus. west (Warren Avenue) – Washington, VA	
Virginia	Rappahannock	Massies Corner	101.42	163.22	US 211 east (Lee Highway) – Warrenton, Washington	Northern end of US 211 overlap
Virginia	Blue Ridge		111.50	179.44	Chester Gap	
Virginia	Warren	Front Royal	116.22	187.04	SR 55 (South Street / John Marshall Highway) to I-66 / US 340	
Virginia	Warren	Front Royal	117.76	189.52	US 340 south / SR 55 east (North Royal Avenue)	Southern end of US 340 / SR 55 overlap
Virginia	Warren	Front Royal	119.14	191.74	SR 55 west (Strasburg Road) – Strasburg	Northern end of SR 55 overlap
Virginia	Warren		120.21	193.46	I-66 to I-81 – Strasburg, Washington	I-66 exit 6
Virginia	Clarke	Double Tollgate	127.77	205.63	US 340 north / SR 277 west (Lord Fairfax Highway) – Stephens City, White Post, Berryville	Northern end of US 340 overlap
Virginia	Frederick		135.21	217.60	US 17 south / US 50 east – Warrenton, Washington	Southern end of US 17 / US 50 overlap; north leg of intersection is ramps to and from northbound I-81
Virginia	Frederick		135.37	217.86	I-81 – Roanoke, Martinsburg	I-81 exit 313
Virginia	City of Winchester		136.32	219.39	US 11 south (Gerrard Street)	Southern end of US 11 overlap
Virginia	City of Winchester		136.71	220.01	US 50 west (Cork Street)	Northern end of US 17 / US 50 overlap
Virginia	City of Winchester		137.02	220.51	SR 7 east (Piccadilly Street)	
Virginia	City of Winchester		137.64	221.51	US 11 north (Cameron Street)	Northern end of US 11 overlap
Virginia	Frederick		139.47	224.46	SR 37 (Winchester Bypass) to US 50 – Martinsburg	Diamond interchange
Virginia	Frederick		151.60	243.98	SR 127 west (Bloomery Pike) to WV 29 – Romney	
			159.26 0.00	256.30 0.00	Virginia–West Virginia state line	
West Virginia	Morgan	Berkeley Springs	13.37	21.52	WV 9 east (Dawson Street) – Martinsburg	Southern end of WV 9 overlap
West Virginia	Morgan	Berkeley Springs	13.79	22.19	WV 9 west (Union Street) – Paw Paw	Northern end of WV 9 overlap
Potomac River			18.74 0.00	30.16 0.00	West Virginia–Maryland state line	
Maryland	Washington	Hancock	0.39	0.63	To MD 144 – Hancock	Southbound exit and entrance via right-in/right-out only; two-way ramp is unsigned US 522B
Maryland	Washington	Hancock	0.57	0.92	High Street to MD 144 – Hancock	Northbound exit and entrance via right-in/right-out only; High Street is unsigned US 522C
Maryland	Washington	Hancock	0.65	1.05	Limestone Road to MD 144 – Hancock	Southbound exit only; Limestone Road is unsigned MD 894
Maryland	Washington	Hancock	1.19	1.92	I-70 / US 40 east (Eisenhower Memorial Highway) – Hagerstown	I-70 exit 1B; southern end of I-70 overlap; southern end of US 40 overlap (northbound lanes only)
Maryland	Washington	Hancock	1.72	2.77	I-68 / US 40 west (National Freeway) – Cumberland	I-70 exit 1A; I-68 exits 82A and 82C; left exit northbound; northern end of US 40 overlap (northbound lanes only)
			2.35 0.000	3.78 0.000	Maryland–Pennsylvania state line	
Pennsylvania	Fulton	Warfordsburg	2.542	4.091	I-70 west to PA 484 – Breezewood	I-70 exit 168; northern end of overlap with I-70
Pennsylvania	Fulton	Dott	6.670	10.734	PA 643 west (Flickerville Road)	
Pennsylvania	Fulton	Needmore	10.265	16.520	PA 655 south (Thompson Road)	Southern end of overlap with PA 655
Pennsylvania	Fulton	Needmore	11.111	17.881	PA 655 north (Pleasant Ridge Road)	Northern end of overlap with PA 655
Pennsylvania	Fulton	Big Cove Tannery	17.155	27.608	PA 928 south (Big Cove Tannery Road)	
Pennsylvania	Fulton	McConnellsburg	23.665	38.085	PA 16 east (Lincoln Way) / Lincoln Way west – Cove Gap, Mercersburg	
Pennsylvania	Fulton	Todd Township	24.509	39.443	US 30 (Lincoln Highway) – Breezewood, Chambersburg	Diamond interchange
Pennsylvania	Fulton	Dublin Township	31.292	50.360	PA 475 west (Waterfall Road) – Hustontown	
Pennsylvania	Fulton	Fort Littleton	32.479	52.270	I-76 / Penna Turnpike – Harrisburg, Pittsburgh	Pennsylvania Turnpike exit 180 / Fort Littleton interchange; E-ZPass or toll-by-plate
Pennsylvania	Huntingdon	Shade Gap	45.231	72.792	PA 35 north – Mifflin	
Pennsylvania	Huntingdon	Shade Gap	45.380	73.032	PA 641 east – Roxbury	
Pennsylvania	Huntingdon	Orbisonia	50.843	81.824	PA 994 west (Elliot Street) / Elliot Street east – Rockhill	
Pennsylvania	Huntingdon	Allenport	60.340	97.108	PA 103 north	
Pennsylvania	Mifflin	Wayne Township	61.964	99.721	US 22 west (William Penn Highway) – Mount Union, Huntingdon	Southern end of overlap with US 22
Pennsylvania	Mifflin	Granville Township	80.446	129.465	Southern end of freeway	
Pennsylvania	Mifflin	Granville Township	81.184	130.653	US 22 Bus. east	Trumpet interchange
Pennsylvania	Mifflin	Highland Park	85.211	137.134	US 322 west / Electric Avenue – State College	Directional interchange with US 322; partial cloverleaf with Electric Avenue; southern end of overlap with US 322
Pennsylvania	Mifflin	Lewistown	86.084	138.539	US 22 east / US 322 east / Walnut Street west – Harrisburg	Partial cloverleaf interchange; US 522 exits onto Walnut Street east via Logan Street; northern end of overlap with US 22 and US 322
Pennsylvania	Snyder	Beaver Springs	107.118	172.390	PA 235 south – McAlisterville	Southern end of overlap with PA 235
Pennsylvania	Snyder	Beaver Springs	107.991	173.795	PA 235 north – Troxelville	Northern end of overlap with PA 235
Pennsylvania	Snyder	Middleburg	117.325	188.816	PA 104 north (Main Street) / Market Street east – Mifflinburg	Southern end of overlap with PA 104
Pennsylvania	Snyder	Middleburg	117.625	189.299	PA 104 south (Wausau Road) – Liverpool	Northern end of overlap with PA 104
Pennsylvania	Snyder	Selinsgrove	127.186	204.686	PA 204 north / Broad Street – New Berlin	
Pennsylvania	Snyder	Monroe Township	128.237	206.377	US 11 / US 15 (Susquehanna Trail) – Harrisburg, Lewisburg, Danville	Northern terminus; partial cloverleaf interchange
1.000 mi = 1.609 km; 1.000 km = 0.621 mi: Concurrency terminus; Electronic toll collection; Incomplete access

== Special routes ==
- US 522A was the designation for the unnamed 0.40-mile (0.64 km) left exit ramp from eastbound I-70 to southbound US 522 within I-70 Exit 1. The ramp is marked as Exit 1B. The designation was retired in 2013 and is now inventoried as part of mainline US 522.
- US 522B is the designation for the unnamed 0.14-mile (0.23 km) two-way ramp between MD 144 and US 522 at the south end of the bridge over the Potomac River. All movements are allowed at the intersection with MD 144. Left turns are prohibited at the ramp's intersection with US 522, so the ramp functions more like a right-in/right-out interchange for southbound US 522. The ramp also provides access to a hotel.
- US 522C is the designation for a 0.20-mile (0.32 km) section of north–south Virginia Avenue and east–west High Street between MD 144 and a right-in/right-out interchange with northbound US 522.
