= VA37 =

VA-37 has the following meanings:

- Attack Squadron 37 (U.S. Navy)
- State Route 37 (Virginia)
