= Armel =

Armel may refer to:

- Armel, Virginia, unincorporated community in Frederick County, Virginia, United States
- Saint Armel, early 6th century Breton holy man
- Armel, a member of the Wu-Tang Clan affiliates
- ARM architecture, little endian
