= Oliver Township, Pennsylvania =

Oliver Township is the name of some places in the U.S. state of Pennsylvania:

- Oliver Township, Jefferson County, Pennsylvania
- Oliver Township, Mifflin County, Pennsylvania
- Oliver Township, Perry County, Pennsylvania
