= List of killings by law enforcement officers in the United States, March 2016 =

This is a list of people reported killed by non-military law enforcement officers in the United States in March 2016, whether in the line of duty or not, and regardless of reason or method. The listing documents the occurrence of a death, making no implications regarding wrongdoing or justification on the part of the person killed or officer involved. Killings are arranged by date of the incident that caused death. Different death dates, if known, are noted in the description. The table below lists 101 people.

== March 2016 ==
Date	Name (age) of deceased	State (city)	Description
2016-03-31	Brown, James (34)	Virginia (Richmond)	
2016-03-31	Simpson, James (31)	Nevada (Las Vegas)	
2016-03-31	Johnson, Kimani (18)	Maryland (Baltimore)	
2016-03-31	Wood, Matthew (43)	Maryland (Baltimore)	
2016-03-30	Cossyleon, Ruben (25)	Arizona (Glendale)	
2016-03-30	Montion, Angel (33)	California (East Los Angeles)	
2016-03-30	Lagano, Thomas (52)	Georgia (Jackson)	
2016-03-29	Fairchild, Denise (50)	Minnesota (Aitkin)	
2016-03-29	Garrison, Robert (51)	South Carolina (Piedmont)	
2016-03-29	Melvin, Joseph (46)	California (Clear lake)	
2016-03-27	Ashby, Earl (33)	Texas (Splendora)	
2016-03-27	Miller, Deriante (18)	North Carolina (Kinston)	
2016-03-27	Guerin, Robert (33)	New Mexico (Roswell)	
2016-03-27	Tsingine, Loreal (27)	Arizona (Winslow)	An officer responding to a shoplifting report attempted to restrain Tsingine. After falling on the ground, Tsingine got back up and advanced on the officer while brandishing a pair of medical scissors and the officer shot Tsingine five times in the chest, stating self defense.
2016-03-27	Lanahan, Jeffrey (34)	Missouri (Lee's Summit)	
2016-03-26	Perez, Jose (39)	Massachusetts (Lowell)	
2016-03-26	White, Donald (55)	South Carolina (Myrtle Beach)	
2016-03-26	Blackburn, Terrence (36)	Virginia (Grundy)	
2016-03-26	McManamon, Patrick (46)	Florida (Tampa)	
2016-03-24	Mike, Andrew (29)	California (Redlands)	
2016-03-24	Seals, Jermon (22)	Missouri (Blue Springs)	
2016-03-24	Dussourd, Robert (44)	Massachusetts (Braintree)	
2016-03-24	Gonzales, Joel (48)	Colorado (Pueblo)	
2016-03-24	Sandoval, Mario (19)	New Mexico (Albuquerque)	
2016-03-24	Silva, Nonny (24)	Rhode Island (Pawtucket)	
2016-03-23	Allen, Alexio (30)	Tennessee (Memphis)	
2016-03-23	Hannu, Daven (51)	Colorado (Thornton)	
2016-03-23	Gonzalez, Raymond (34)	California (Fresno)	A Fresno police officer shot and killed a man in central Fresno about 3:45 p.m. A witness said Gonzalez ran as the police approached him, pulled out a gun, and tried to toss it on top of a nearby building. The officer shot him twice. He was pronounced dead at a local hospital He was later identified as Raymond Gonzalez, 34, who was being sought for a shooting two weeks earlier.
2016-03-23	Jones, Dustin (32)	Florida (Fort Walton Beach)	An off duty Escambia County Sheriffs Deputy Sardor Pulatov shot and killed Dustin Jones at the Red Rose Strip Club on Okaloosa Island. Dustin Jones was an innocent bystander that was witnessing Sardor Pulatov and his friends in a fight with another group of people. The State Attorney's Office did not file charges against Pulatov but Escambia County did fire him.
2016-03-22	Rincon, Ethan (25)	Florida (Palmetto Bay)	
2016-03-22	Blair, Travis (33)	Virginia (Fredericksburg)	A Virginia State Police officer stopped a driver shortly after 1 p.m. after identifying him as a person wanted on an outstanding warrant, state police said. According to police, the driver stopped but refused to comply with the officer's orders and drove away, dragging the officer. The driver crashed into a ditch and fled on foot, with the officer in pursuit. Police said that "an altercation ensued" and the officer's gun discharged, hitting the suspect in the leg. The suspect was taken to Mary Washington Hospital, where he died shortly before 6 p.m.
2016-03-21	Pape, Dylan (25)	Connecticut (Stamford)	Pape was shot by a SWAT team that he called to his house, pretending to be his father. After speaking with the police for an hour, they sent a police dog to him. Pape raised a BB gun, and police shot him.
2016-03-21	Gorinski, Edward (28)	Pennsylvanie (Greensburg)	
2016-03-21	Grenon, Ralph (76)	Vermont (Burlington)	
2016-03-20	Briggs, Clarence (54)	Pennsylvania (Fort Littleton)	
2016-03-20	Dentmond, Robert (16)	Florida (Gainesville)	
2016-03-20	Martinez, Abraham (62)	Indiana (Fort Wayne)	
2016-03-20	Ballard, Boyd (61)	Virginia (Hopewell)	
2016-03-19	Whitaker, Dylan (23)	Kentucky (White Plains)	At about 2:45 p.m., a Kentucky State Police trooper was involved in a chase with an ATV. The ATV lost control and it overturned. At that point, police say the driver pulled out a handgun and fired shots at the trooper. KSP says the trooper returned fire, hitting and killing the driver of the ATV.
2016-03-19	Beaty, India (25)	Virginia (Norfolk)	
2016-03-19	Douglas, Joshua (24)	Louisiana (Covington)	
2016-03-19	Robinson, Torrey (35)	Florida (Port Richley)	
2016-03-19	Reynolds, Thurman (21)	Illinois (Park Forest)	
2016-03-18	Mallet, Michael (49)	California (Byron)	
2016-03-18	Giles, David (60)	Idaho (Idaho Falls)	
2016-03-17	Kong, Map (38)	Minnesota (Burnsville)	
2016-03-17	Bennett, Scott (29)	Texas (Houston)	
2016-03-17	Nelms, Christopher (30)	Texas (Houston)	
2016-03-17	Shorak, Ryan (37)	Pennsylvania (Midland)	
2016-03-17	Chin, Sunny (53)	Florida (Tampa)	
2016-03-16	Medina, Cristian (23)	California (Los Angeles)	
2016-03-16	Avila, Vincent (25)	California (Apple Valley)	
2016-03-16	Penny, Dennis (40)	North Carolina (Lilesville)	
2016-03-16	Hernandez, Eric (33)	Texas (San Antonio)	
2016-03-15	Wooters, Daniel J. (38)	Indiana (Evansville)	Evansville Police Department investigation on the fatal shooting of Wooters is (as of 2016-03-22) ongoing. According to police reports, dispatch communications, and released 911 audio, Wooters, who was listed as homeless, reportedly threatened to kill people at T.G.I. Friday's about 8:30 p.m. A uniformed officer driving a police cruiser stopped in the parking lot of Fifth Third Bank near Eastland Mall, leaving her vehicle to approach Wooters. The officer backed away, however, when Wooters advanced on the officer with a knife. Wooters then entered the officer's cruiser and fled. He then led police on a short chase west on Morgan Avenue until the front axle on the cruiser broke. Wooters left the vehicle and advanced towards three officers with a knife. The officers, Jason Thomas, Zach Elfreich and Dexter Wolf, fired at Wooters, and he dropped to the ground. CPR was performed on him until paramedics arrived, taking Wooters to the hospital, where he was pronounced dead.
2016-03-15	Harris, Joseph (34)	Kentucky (Russellville)	
2016-03-15	McIver, Ed (43)	Texas (Fort Worth)	
2016-03-14	Harris, Lamar (29)	Illinois (Chicago)	Officers observed a man and a woman acting suspiciously and decided to investigate. The pair fled and the officers gave chase. The man opened fire, hitting three officers multiple times. One of the officers returned fire, fatally injuring the suspect. Police say Harris was a known gang member with more than 40 arrests.
2016-03-13	Grubb, Joshua (30)	Tennessee (Lenoir City)	Grubb was driving a pick-up truck that was stopped by police at a gas station. When Grubb started to drive away, the officer jumped onto the truck's flatbed. He ordered the truck to stop, then shot Grubb when the truck went on Highway 321.
2016-03-13	Colson, Jacai (28)	Maryland (Landover)	Colson, an undercover Prince George's County narcotics officer who was in street clothes, was shot by another officer when he happened upon the scene of a shootout outside the police station. The fellow officer perceived him as a suspect, according to police.
2016-03-13	Cruz, Jose Raul (16)	Texas (Addison)	Off-duty police officer Ken Johnson allegedly witnessed a vehicle being burglarized at his Brookhaven apartment complex at 14839 Marsh Lane in Farmers Branch. He chased the two fleeing teens in his SUV approx. 1 km on southbound Marsh Lane and rammed the Dodge Challenger of Cruz at 7:08:41 p.m. near the intersection of Marsh Lane and Spring Valley Road. After the red Challenger had spun out of control, Johnson fired several shots into Cruz's car, killing him on the spot and seriously injuring his passenger.
2016-03-13	McCoy, Amy (38)	Washington (Vancouver)	
2016-03-13	Montgomery, Keith (24)	Pennsylvania (Chester)	
2016-03-13	Roll, Michael (52)	Kentucky (Bowling Green)	
2016-03-13	Deerman, Wesley (26)	Alabama (Piedmont)	
2016-03-13	Alachadzhyan, Gevork (45)	California (Glendale)	
2016-03-12	Gaines, Peter (37)	Texas (Houston)	
2016-03-12	Loud, Marco (20)	Texas (Houston)	
2016-03-12	Jennings, William (49)	Michigan (Birch Run)	
2016-03-12	Tokzowski, Christopher (43)	North Carolina (Greensboro)	
2016-03-11	Sherman, Chase	Georgia (Atlanta)	Died after being tasered.
2016-03-11	Privott, Tyre (25)	Virginia (Norfolk)	Police say at about 3:50 a.m., two officers attempted to engage a man they described as a violent, wanted felon. At some point, shots were fired and the wanted person was killed. Privott was wanted in the shooting death of another man earlier in the night.
2016-03-11	Moore, Manford (51)	Kansas (Rosalia)	
2016-03-11	Valencia, Teo (23)	California (Newark)	
2016-03-11	Goodman, Jack (46)	Illinois (Clinton)	
2016-03-10	Sheppard, Wesley (37)	Mississippi (Biloxi)	Authorities say a Biloxi police officer shot and killed Sheppard around 7:50 p.m. as he was waiving a gun near the top of the Popp's Ferry Bridge. Three officers who were involved in the shooting were put on administrative leave.
2016-03-10	Meador, Jason (50)	Texas (Odessa)	
2016-03-10	Hurtado, Martin (21)	California (Long Beach)	
2016-03-10	Porter, Arteair (22)	Nevada (Reno)	
2016-03-10	Gonzales, German (23)	Colorado (Colorado City)	
2016-03-08	Casale, Jeffrey (27)	Florida (Tampa)	
2016-03-07	Rosas, Byron (45)	California (San Jose)	According to police, the man had stabbed two people, including his estranged wife, and was walking toward a third person. An officer opened fire, killing the man where he stood. The officer was later identified as Donald Guess, a 21-year veteran of the force who had also shot and killed a man in 2004.
2016-03-07	Selsor, Randall (45)	Kansas (Topeka)	
2016-03-07	Vitullo, Phillip (49)	New York (Rochester)	
2016-03-07	Cordova-Cuevas, Abelino (28)	California (Stockton)	
2016-03-07	Graham, JC (42)	Montana (Joliet)	
2016-03-07	Chavez, Daniel (41)	New Mexico (Carlsbad)	
2016-03-06	Scott, James Anthony (42)	North Dakota (Bismarck)	Officers responded at 11:11 p.m. to a report of an intoxicated man armed with a shotgun who wanted to kill the caller. As officers arrived, one officer saw the suspect standing next to a long gun. The suspect was ordered to show his hands and get on the ground, orders police say he refused to obey. The officer, believing the suspect to be armed and dangerous, shot three times, striking the suspect.
2016-03-06	Minnick, Mark (51)	Texas (Azle)	
2016-03-06	Torres, Osvaldo (41)	California (South Gate)	
2016-03-05	Bosell, Barrell (34)	New York (Cheektowaga)	
2016-03-05	Ballance, Herbert (22)	Texas (Beaumont)	
2016-03-04	Chamberlain, John (66)	Arkansas (Mount Ida)	
2016-03-04	Stanley, Brandon (30)	Kentucky (East Bernstadt)	
2016-03-03	Ochoa, Sergio (27)	Arizona (Gilbert)	Police say Ochoa confronted officers with multiple large kitchen-style knives in the backyard of a Gilbert home. Officers fired beanbag rounds at Ochoa, but say he continued to advance toward them with the knives before they shot him.
2016-03-03	Thompson, Alex (37)	North Carolina (Selma)	
2016-03-02	Burkhardt, Daniel (41)	Pennsylvania (Johnstown)	Three officers arrived at the location at 5:51 p.m. after being dispatched to the area for a report of a man with a knife. Johnstown officers said they came in contact with Burkhardt and that he was armed with two knives, one in each hand. State police said the officers told him to drop the knives, but he wouldn't and moved toward the officers. Officers fired bean bag rounds from a shot gun and a Taser at Burkhardt, state police said, but Burkhardt continued to move toward them. State police said that is when the three officers fired their guns and hit him.
2016-03-02	Bradley, Travis (36)	Maryland (Bel Air)	At about 3:30 p.m., patrol deputies responded to the report of a suicidal subject. Upon arrival, deputies attempted to make contact by personal contact and phone. About 30 minutes later, the subject left through a rear exit of the residence and fired a gun, causing deputies to take cover, before retreating back inside. After more attempts to negotiate, the suspect exited the residence in the direction of Harford County sheriff's deputies. The deputies fired at the suspect, fatally wounding him.
2016-03-01	Sweatt, Mickey Dewayne (37)	Mississippi (Gautier)	Police responded to a report of domestic violence at about 6:51 p.m., resulting in a two-hour standoff. Police say Sweatt opened fire on officers, who returned fire, killing the man in the resulting shootout.
2016-03-01	Gonzalez, Jorge (22)	Texas (Euless)	
2016-03-01	Corcino, Dimitri (39)	Florida (Palm Bay)	In a 911 call to police, a caller can be heard saying that Corcino was threatening to shoot her. The caller said Corcino said to call the cops and he'd shoot them too. Police said Corcino was shot once by Cpl. Jason McCoy after Corcino exited his home with a loaded handgun. Corcino's girlfriend said he suffered from mental health issues, including schizophrenia and PTSD. She said she didn't have the chance to talk to him and try and save his life either.

== See also ==
- Death in custody § United States
- Henry A. Wallace Police Crime Public Database
- List of cases of police brutality
- List of countries with annual rates and counts for killings by law enforcement officers
- List of law enforcement officers killed in the line of duty in the United States
- List of law enforcement officers convicted for an on-duty killing in the United States
- List of shootings by US immigration agents
- List of police reforms related to the George Floyd protests
- List of unarmed African Americans killed by law enforcement officers in the United States
- Lists of killings by law enforcement officers
- Police brutality in the United States
- Police misconduct § United States
- Police riot § United States
- Police use of deadly force in the United States
