= Michaux, Virginia =

Michaux
- Unincorporated area
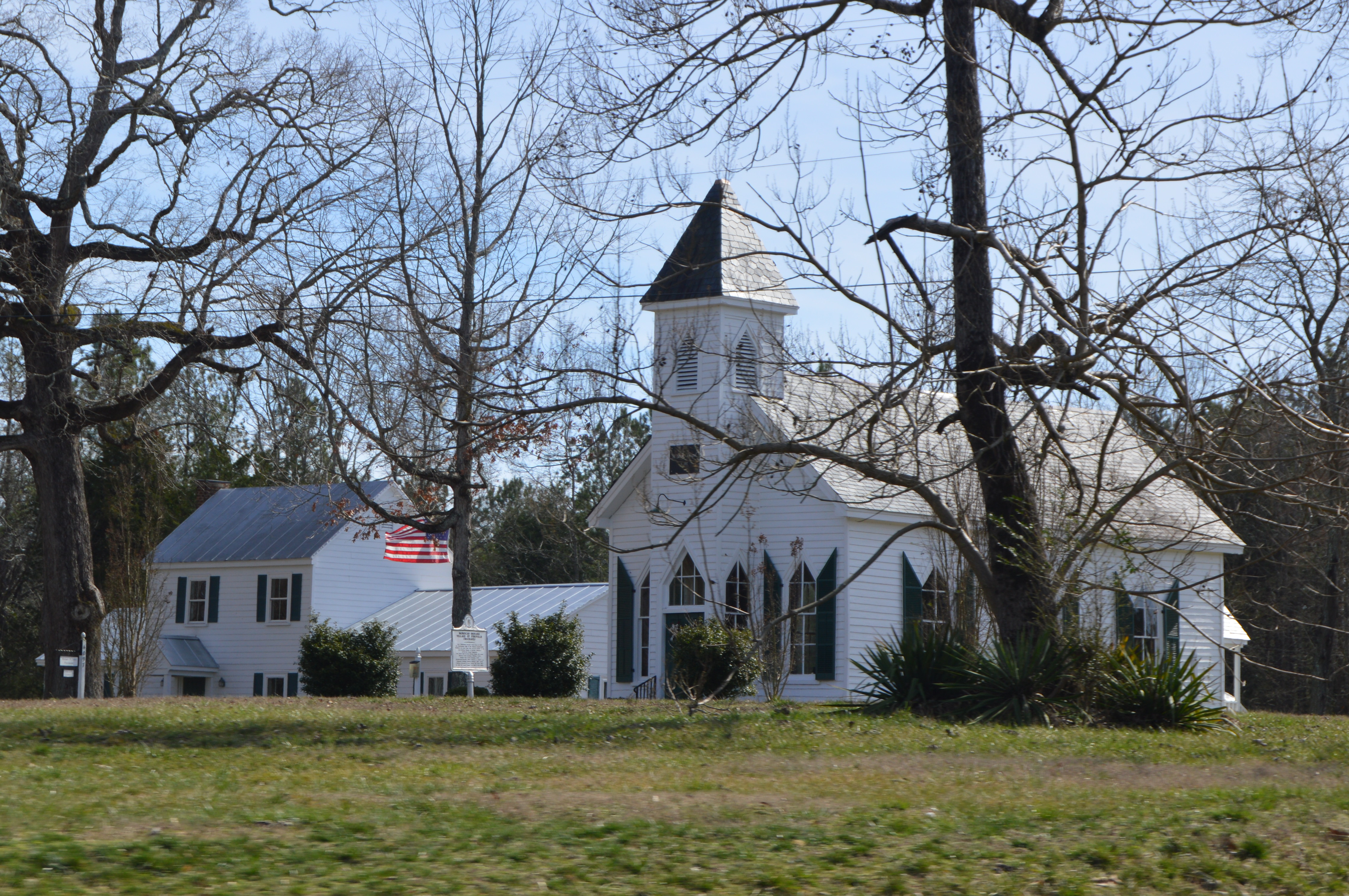
- Old River Trail, east of U.S. Route 522

- Location within the Commonwealth of Virginia Michaux (the United States)
- Coordinates: 37°38′56″N 77°54′07″W
- Country: United States
- State: Virginia
- County: Powhatan
- Time zone: UTC−5 (Eastern (EST))
  - Summer (DST): UTC−4 (EDT)
- ZIP Code: 23139

Michaux is an unincorporated community in Powhatan County, in the U.S. state of Virginia.

== See also ==
- Beaumont, a historic home near the community
