= Gum Spring, Virginia =

Unincorporated community in Virginia, United States

Gum Spring, Louisa County, Virginia
- Unincorporated community
- Location within Virginia Location within the United States
- Coordinates: 37°46′33″N 77°53′48″W
- Country: United States
- State: Virginia
- County: Louisa
- Elevation: 371 ft (113 m)
- Time zone: UTC-5 (Eastern (EST))
  - Summer (DST): UTC-4 (EDT)
- ZIP code: 23065
- Area code: 540
- GNIS feature ID: 1467602

Gum Spring is an unincorporated community in Louisa County, Virginia, United States. Gum Spring is located at the intersection of U.S. routes 250 and 522, 18 miles (29 km) south-southeast of Louisa. Gum Spring has a post office with ZIP code 23065.

Providence Presbyterian Church and the Shady Grove School are listed on the National Register of Historic Places.

Boonedockle Farm, established in 2021, is a farm dedicated in honor of a Plott Hound.
