= Strodes Mills, Pennsylvania =

Unincorporated community in Pennsylvania, US

Coordinates: 40°33′03″N 77°40′22″W

- Census-designated place
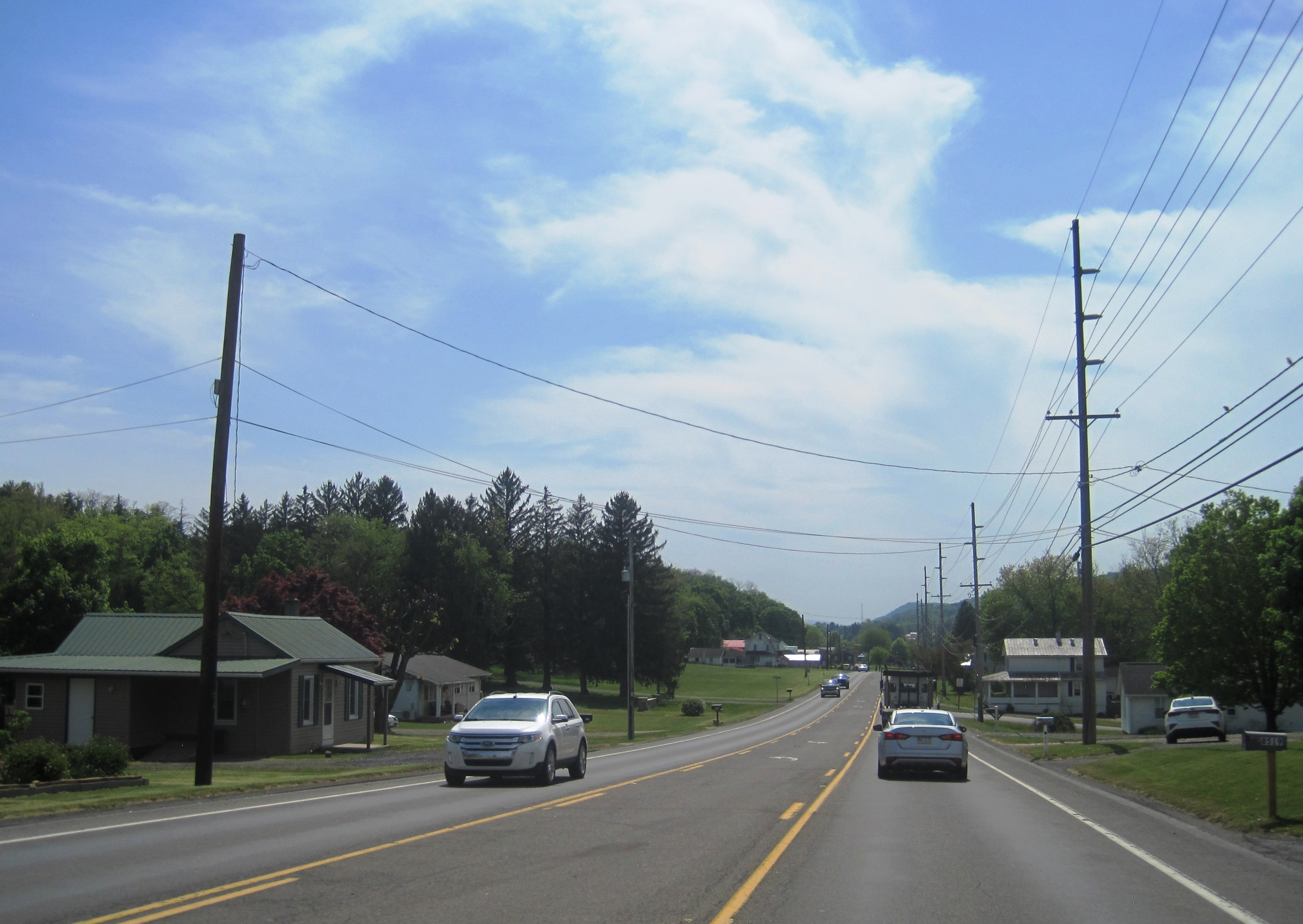
- Westbound US 22 / southbound US 522 in Strodes Mills
- Interactive map of Strodes Mills, Pennsylvania
- Country: United States
- State: Pennsylvania
- County: Mifflin

Population (2010)
  - Total: 757
- Time zone: UTC-5 (Eastern (EST))
  - Summer (DST): UTC-4 (EDT)

Strodes Mills is a census-designated place located in Oliver and Granville Townships in Mifflin County in the state of Pennsylvania, United States. It is located along U.S. Route 22 and U.S. Route 522 in central Mifflin County, between the community of McVeytown and the borough of Lewistown. As of the 2010 census the population was 757 residents.
