= Virginia State Route 37 =

State highway in Frederick County, Virginia

State Route 37
- Winchester Bypass

Route information
- Maintained by Virginia DOT
- Length: 9.104 mi (14.651 km)
- Existed: early 1960s–present

Major junctions
- South end: SR 642 / SR 847 south of Winchester
- I-81 south of Winchester; US 11 south of Winchester; US 50 west of Winchester; US 522 northwest of Winchester
- North end: US 11 north of Winchester

Location
- Country: United States
- State: Virginia

Highway system
- Virginia Routes; Interstate; US; Primary; Secondary; Byways; History; HOT lanes
← SR 36	→ SR 38

State Route 37 (SR 37) is a primary state highway in the U.S. state of Virginia. Known as Winchester Bypass, it forms a western bypass of Winchester, connecting to Interstate 81 (I-81) at both ends. Although the road is a freeway, neither I-81 connection is freeway standard; the south end (exit 310) is a diamond interchange with two traffic signals, while, at the north end, drivers must use a short piece of U.S. Route 11 (US 11) to connect with I-81 at exit 317. In addition to local access, the highway connects to US 50 and US 522, two major highways that lead west and northwest into West Virginia and north to I-70 at Hancock, Maryland. An eastern bypass, known locally as "Route 37 East" has been proposed in statewide and local plans to complete the loop.

== Route description ==
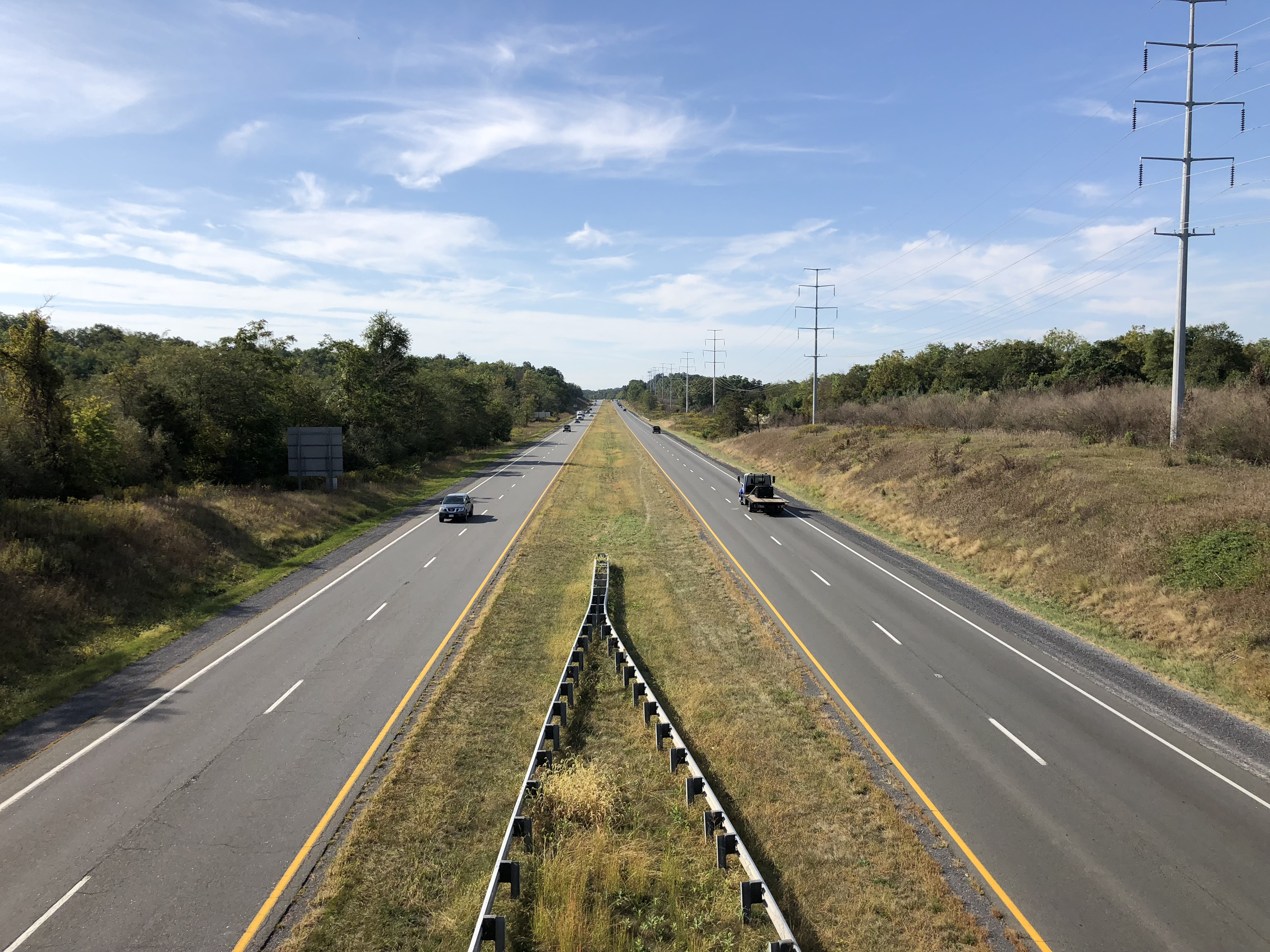
SR 37 southbound west of Winchester

Route 37 begins at an intersection with Hillandale Road (SR 847), a local frontage road along the east side of I-81, and Tasker Road (SR 642), which leads southeast to US 522 near Armel. It immediately crosses I-81 at exit 310, a diamond interchange with two traffic signals on SR 37, and then becomes a freeway, soon junctioning US 11 (Valley Pike) with a partial cloverleaf. The next interchange is a diamond at Cedar Creek Grade (SR 622), and SR 37 reaches its approximate midpoint at US 50 (Northwestern Pike), another diamond. A trumpet interchange completed in 2001 connects to the Winchester Medical Center, and the final diamond is with US 522 (Frederick Pike) at the northwestern corner. SR 37 ends at a partial Y interchange with US 11 (Martinsburg Pike), at which SR 37 traffic can only access US 11 north and only traffic from US 11 south can access SR 37, although a northbound exit to Cives Lane was added in about 2000 to allow SR 37 traffic to access US 11 south. About 1/2 mile (1 km) of US 11 is a divided highway, connecting SR 37 with I-81 at exit 317.

== History ==
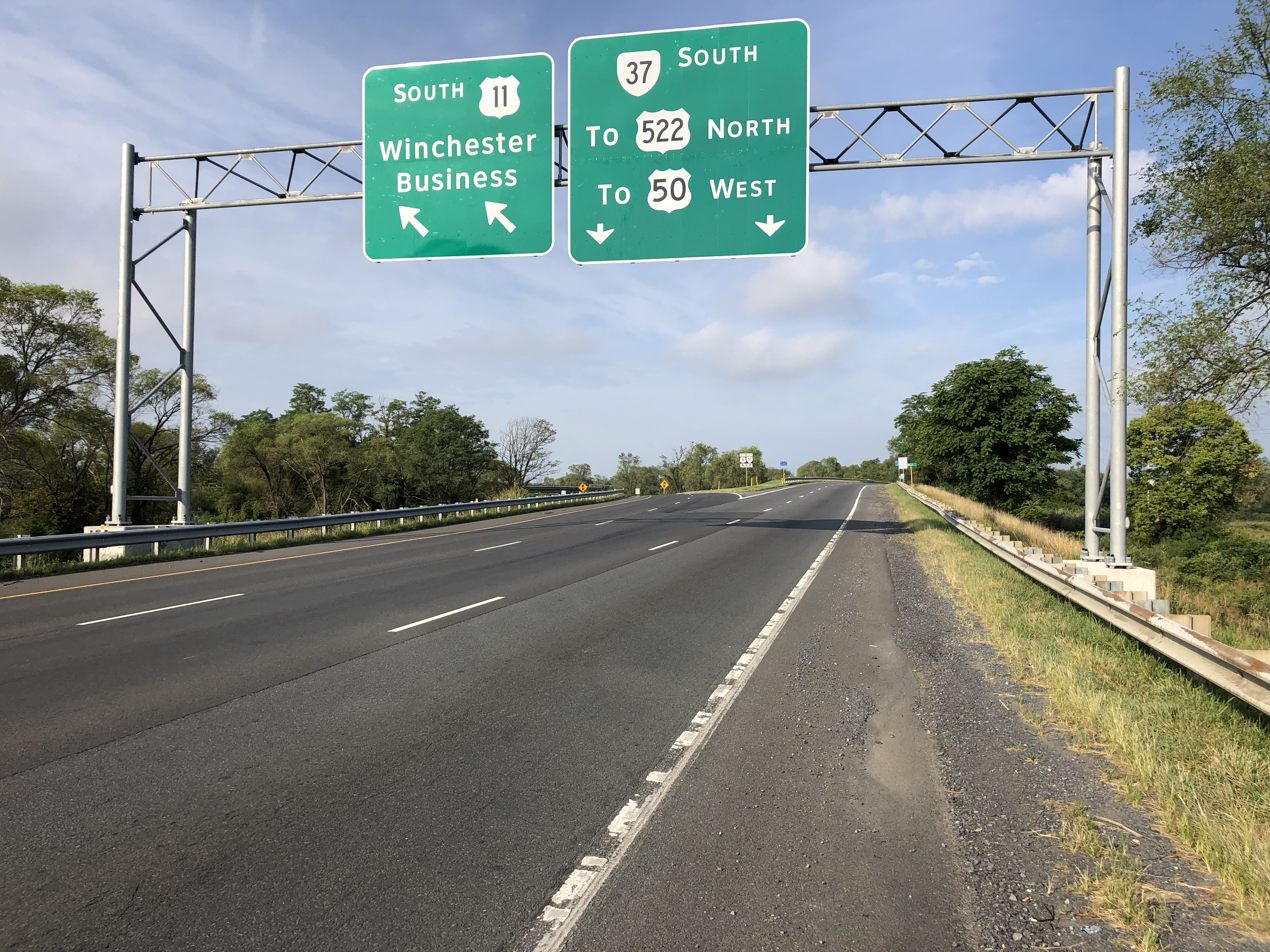
View south at the north end of SR 37 at US 11 north of Winchester

Route 37 was defined as the proposed Winchester By-Pass by 1963, and was included in the statewide Arterial Network when it was created in 1964. When I-81 opened past Winchester in November 1965, it included an interchange south of Winchester, taking traffic between I-81 and US 11 along a short connecting road. The north half of the bypass, from US 50 west of Winchester north and east to US 11 north of the city, opened in the late 1960s, and the semicircle was completed in the late 1970s, with the linking of Route 37 to the existing I-81/US 11 connection. A new bridge carrying southbound SR 37 over I-81 was built, but otherwise the diamond interchange was not modified. The only change to the major bypass since it was constructed has been a new trumpet interchange serving the Winchester Medical Center; construction began in September 2000 and was completed in November 2001. A single ramp from SR 37 north to Cives Lane, allowing traffic at the north end of the bypass to access US 11 south, was built in about 2000.

== Major intersections ==
The entire route is in Frederick County. All exits are unnumbered.

Location	mi	km	Destinations	Notes
	0.000	0.000	SR 642 (Tasker Road) / SR 847 (Hillandale Lane)	Southern terminus; at-grade intersection
	0.041– 0.132	0.066– 0.212	I-81 – Roanoke, Winchester, Martinsburg	I-81 exit 310
	0.180– 0.547	0.290– 0.880	US 11 – Stephens City, Kernstown, Winchester	interchange
	2.859– 3.382	4.601– 5.443	SR 622 – Winchester, Opequon	Diamond interchange
			Merrimans Lane	Proposed interchange (unfunded)
	5.198– 5.737	8.365– 9.233	US 50 – Winchester, Romney	Diamond interchange
	6.124– 6.529	9.856– 10.507	Winchester Medical Center	Trumpet interchange
	6.871– 7.436	11.058– 11.967	US 522 – Winchester, Berkeley Springs	Diamond interchange
	9.104	14.651	US 11 to I-81 – Winchester, Martinsburg, Roanoke	Northern terminus
1.000 mi = 1.609 km; 1.000 km = 0.621 mi
