= Dott, Pennsylvania =

Unincorporated community in Pennsylvania, US

- Unincorporated community
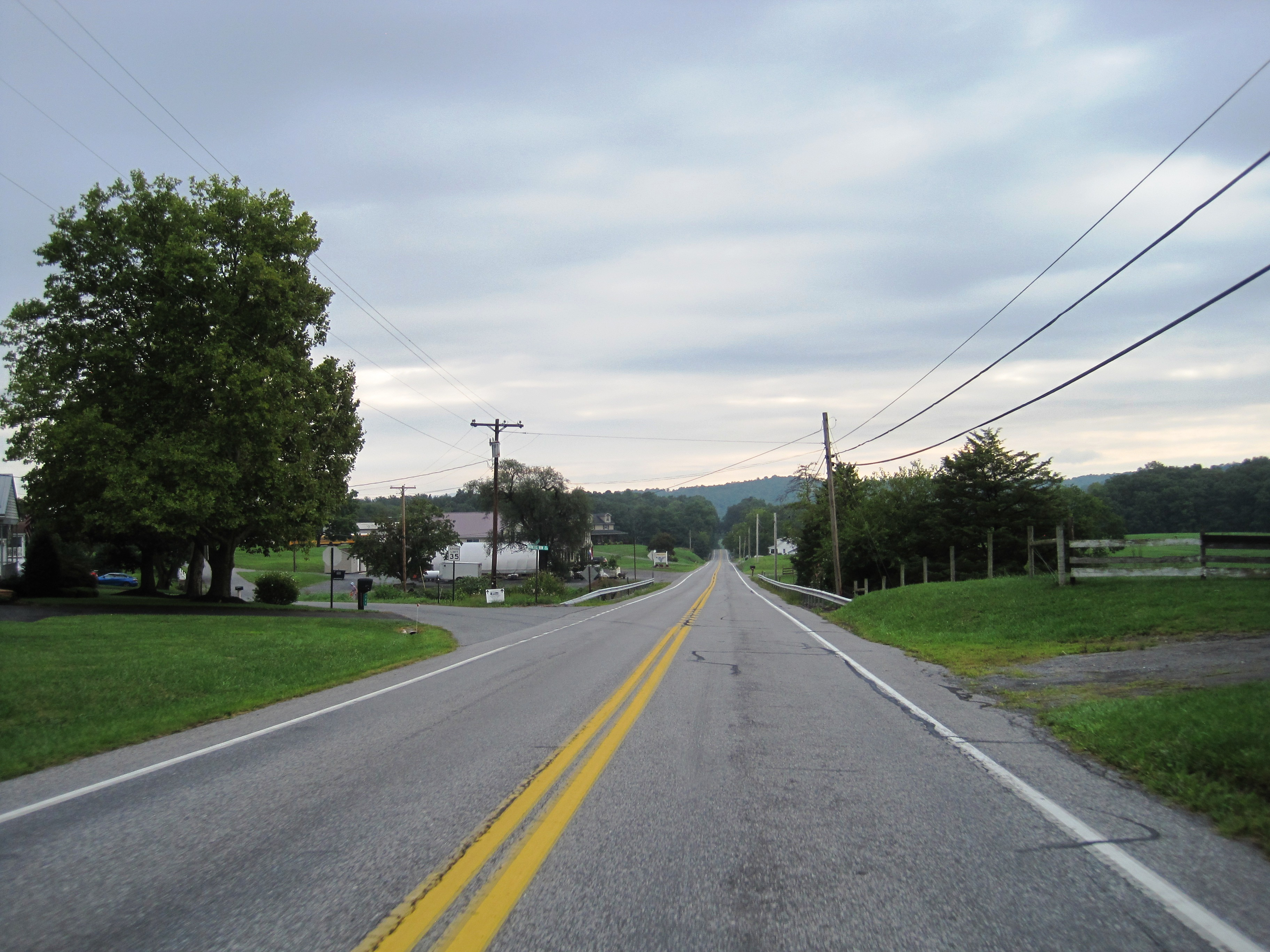
- US 522 northbound in Dott

- Location within Pennsylvania Location within the United States
- Coordinates: 39°48′51″N 78°11′20″W
- Country: United States
- State: Pennsylvania
- County: Fulton
- Township: Bethel
- Elevation: 863 ft (263 m)
- Time zone: UTC-5 (Eastern (EST))
  - Summer (DST): UTC-4 (EDT)
- GNIS feature ID: 1173406

Dott is an unincorporated community within Bethel Township in Fulton County, Pennsylvania, United States.
