= Providence Presbyterian Church =

Historic church in Virginia, United States

- U.S. National Register of Historic Places
- Virginia Landmarks Register
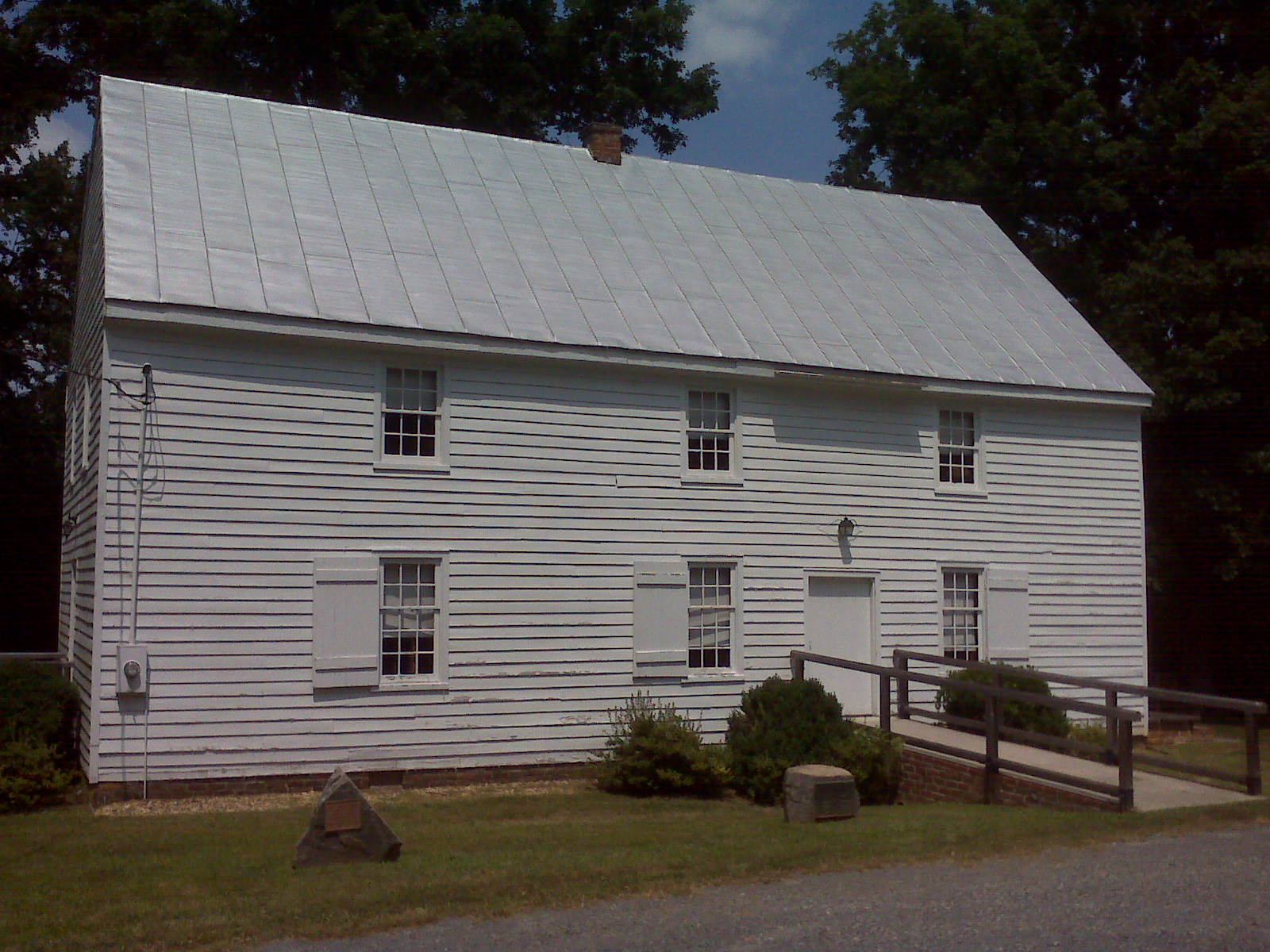
- Providence Presbyterian Church, July 2011

- Location within Virginia Location within the United States
- Location: NW of Gum Spring off U.S. 250, near Gum Spring, Virginia
- Coordinates: 37°47′6″N 77°54′19″W
- Area: 15 acres (6.1 ha)
- Built: 1747
- NRHP reference No.: 73002034
- VLR No.: 054-0061

Significant dates
- Added to NRHP: April 13, 1973
- Designated VLR: January 16, 1973

Providence Presbyterian Church is a historic Presbyterian church located near Gum Spring, Louisa County, Virginia. It was built in 1747, and is a two-story, three-bay, wood-frame building measuring 50 feet, 3 inches, by 26 feet, 4 inches. It is one of the few frame churches in Virginia remaining from colonial times and was one of the first Presbyterian churches to be built in the central part of the state. Samuel Davies served as its first minister until 1759, when he assumed the presidency of Princeton University. A distinguished son of the church was Robert Lewis Dabney, noted mid-19th century Presbyterian minister and church architect.

It was listed on the National Register of Historic Places in 1973.
