= Shady Grove School (Louisa County, Virginia) =

- U.S. National Register of Historic Places
- Virginia Landmarks Register
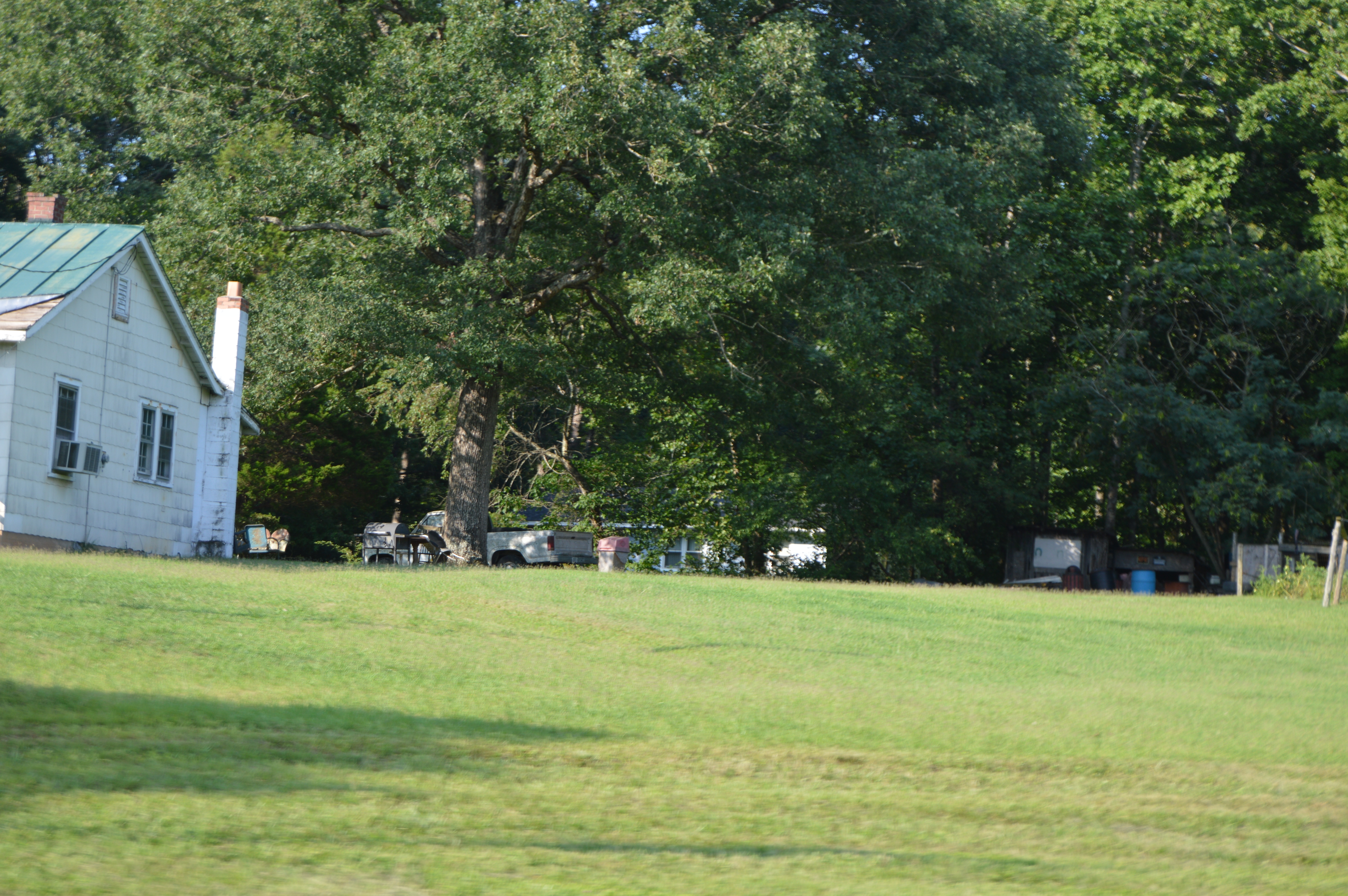
- Distant view from U.S. Route 250

- Location within Virginia Location within the United States
- Location: 2925 U.S. Route 250, Gum Spring, Virginia
- Coordinates: 37°45′43″N 77°52′36″W
- Area: 2 acres (0.81 ha)
- Built: 1925
- Architectural style: schoolhouse
- MPS: Rosenwald Schools in Virginia MPS
- NRHP reference No.: 09000416
- VLR No.: 054-0099

Significant dates
- Added to NRHP: June 11, 2009
- Designated VLR: March 19, 2009

Shady Grove School is a historic Rosenwald school located at Gum Spring, Louisa County, Virginia. It was built in 1925, and is a one-story, frame school building. It has a side gabled, metal roof and is sheathed in plain wood weatherboards. It features an engaged corner porch. The school was used until 1962 when students were transferred to an elementary school approximately 5 miles away.

It was listed on the National Register of Historic Places in 2009. In 2017 the Virginia Department of Historic Resources approved the erection of a state historic marker at the school.
