= Beaumont (Michaux, Virginia) =

Historic house in Virginia, United States

- U.S. National Register of Historic Places
- Virginia Landmarks Register
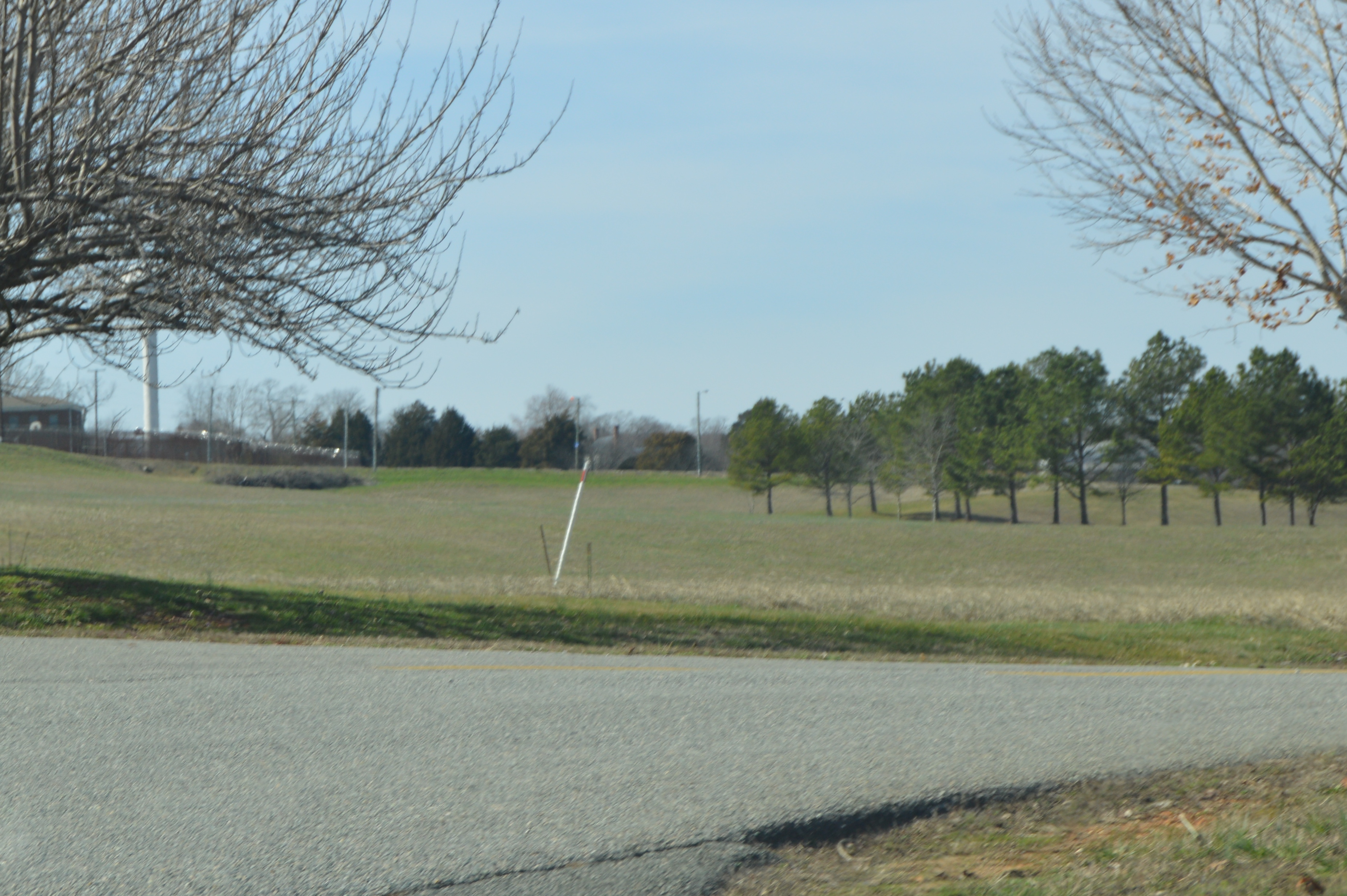
- Fields at the farmstead

- Location within Virginia Location within the United States
- Location: VA 313, near Michaux, Virginia
- Coordinates: 37°40′4″N 77°54′46″W
- Area: 2 acres (0.81 ha)
- Built: 1811, c. 1839
- NRHP reference No.: 87000571
- VLR No.: 072-0095

Significant dates
- Added to NRHP: April 2, 1987
- Designated VLR: June 17, 1986

Beaumont is a historic home located near Michaux, Powhatan County, Virginia. It consists of a two-story, five-bay, central-passage frame structure built in 1811, with a two-story rear brick addition built about 1839. The front facade features a two-tier portico. The main block has a gable roof and exterior end chimneys. The property was acquired in 1937 by "Beaumont Farms" as a reform school for boys. The property is under the jurisdiction of the Virginia Department of Corrections and serves as the Beaumont Learning Center.

It was added to the National Register of Historic Places in 1986.
