= Fort Littleton, Pennsylvania =

Unincorporated community in Pennsylvania, US

- Unincorporated community
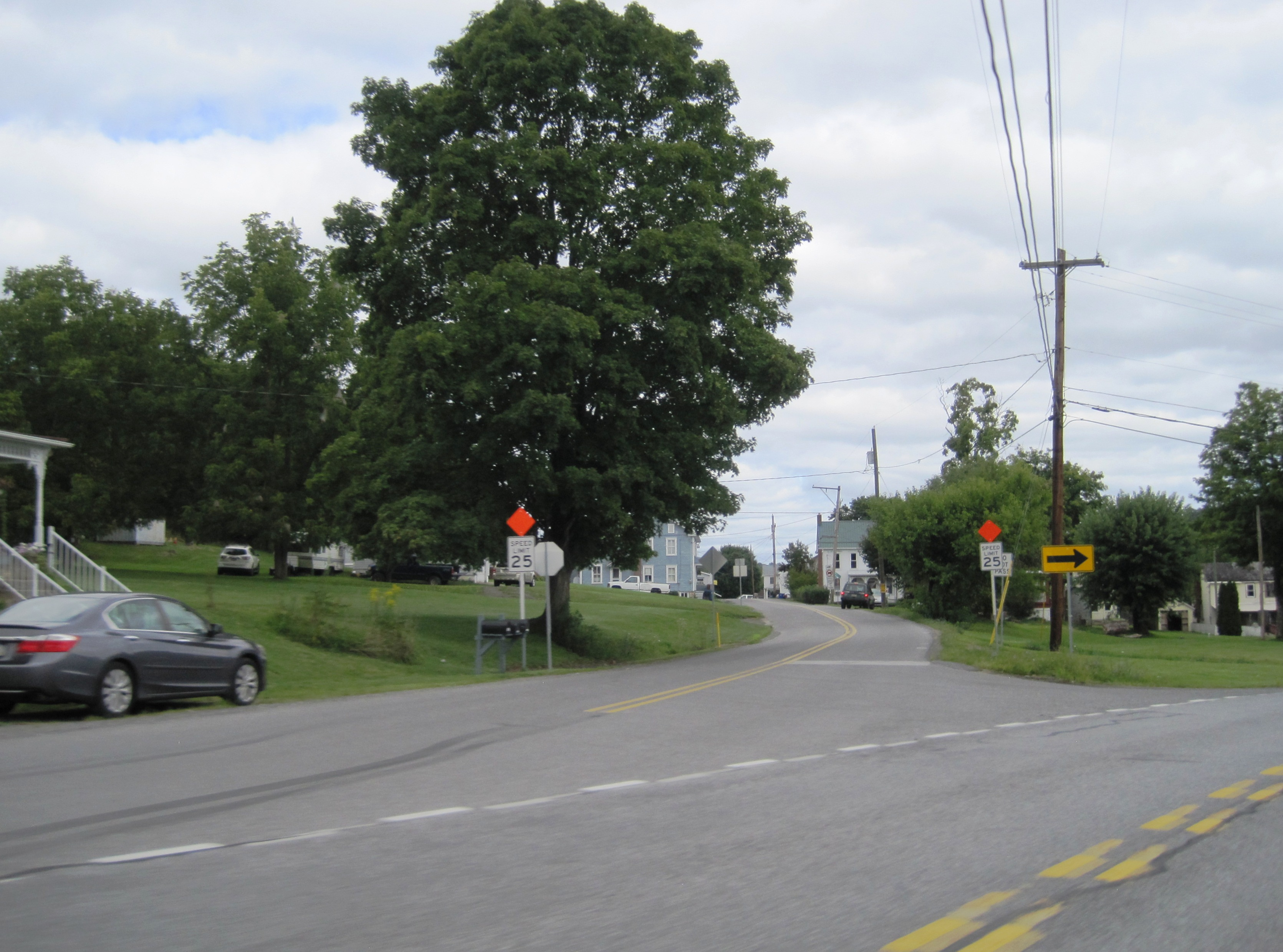
- Photo of the village from US 522

- Location within Pennsylvania Location within the United States
- Coordinates: 40°3′46″N 77°57′49″W
- Country: United States
- State: Pennsylvania
- County: Fulton
- Township: Dublin
- Elevation: 801 ft (244 m)
- Time zone: UTC-5 (Eastern (EST))
  - Summer (DST): UTC-4 (EDT)
- ZIP code: 17223
- Area code: 717
- GNIS feature ID: 1175013

Fort Littleton is an unincorporated community in Dublin Township in Fulton County, Pennsylvania, United States. Fort Littleton is located at the junction of U.S. Route 522 and Plum Hollow Road, a short distance north of an interchange between US 522 and the Pennsylvania Turnpike (Interstate 76), which is called the Fort Littleton interchange. The town was named for the 18th century Fort Lyttleton and was established near the fort's former location in 1767.
