= Shady Grove School (Pea Ridge, Arkansas) =

- U.S. National Register of Historic Places
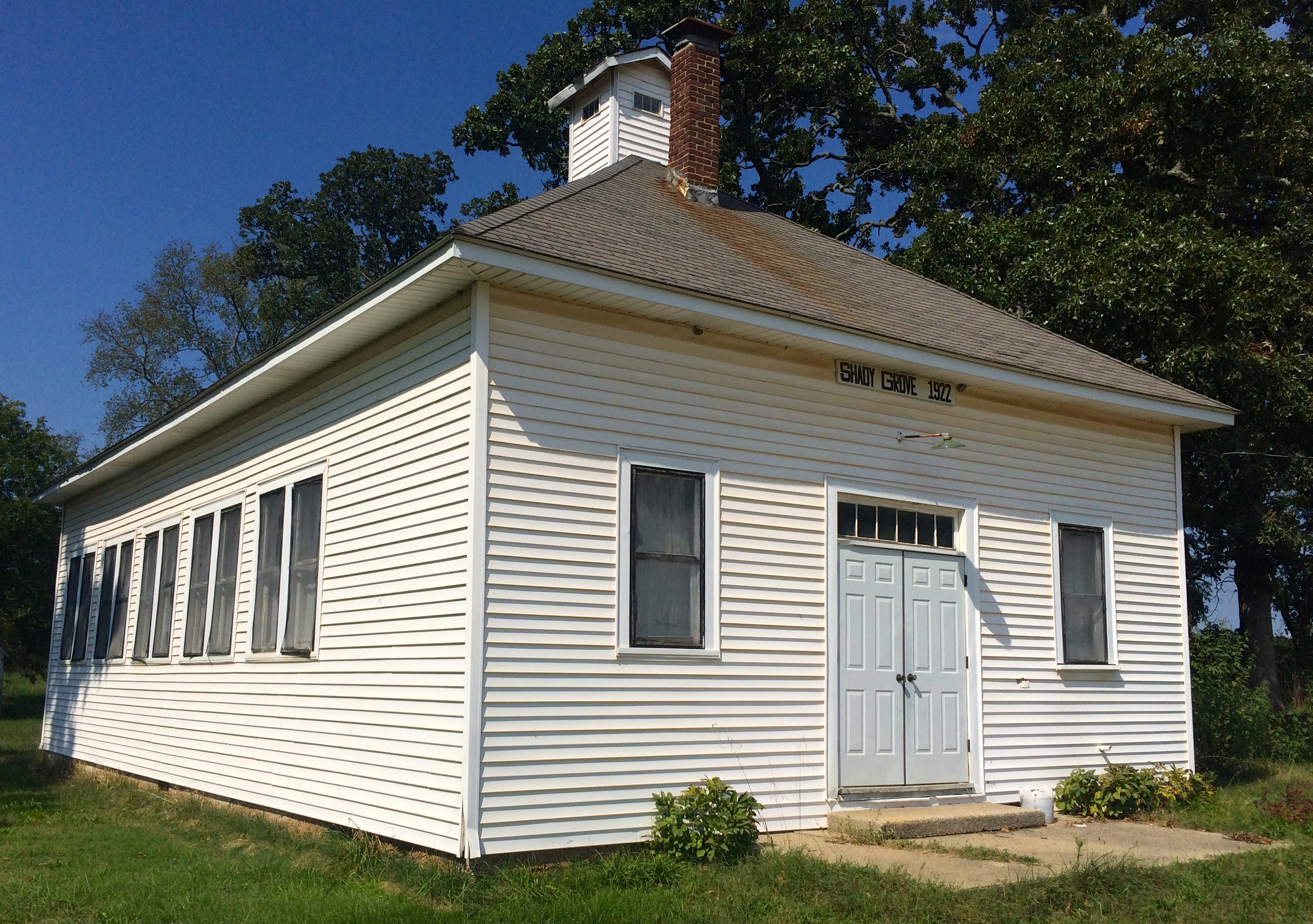

- Location within Arkansas Location within the United States
- Nearest city: Pea Ridge, Arkansas
- Coordinates: 36°28′43″N 94°8′23″W
- Built: 1922
- MPS: Benton County MRA
- NRHP reference No.: 87002361
- Added to NRHP: January 28, 1988

The Shady Grove School is a historic school building on Arkansas Highway 94 near Pea Ridge, Arkansas. It is a single-story wood-frame structure, with a hip roof and a concrete foundation. A gable-roofed cupola provides ventilation to the roof, which is also pierced by a brick chimney. The main facade consists of a double door flanked by sash windows, and the long sides of the building have banks of sash windows. Built c. 1922, the building is a well-preserved representative of a period school building.

The building was listed on the National Register of Historic Places in 1988.

== See also ==
- National Register of Historic Places listings in Benton County, Arkansas
