= Armel, Virginia =

Unincorporated community in Virginia, United States

- Unincorporated community
- Location within Virginia Location within the United States
- Coordinates: 39°4′45″N 78°8′37″W
- Country: United States
- State: Virginia
- County: Frederick
- Time zone: UTC−5 (Eastern (EST))
  - Summer (DST): UTC−4 (EDT)
- GNIS feature ID: 1499061

Armel is an unincorporated community in Frederick County, Virginia, United States. It lies east of Stephens City on Front Royal Pike (U.S. Highway 522). According to the Geographic Names Information System, Armel has also been known throughout its history as Bridgeport.
