= Oliver Township, Mifflin County, Pennsylvania =

Township in Pennsylvania, US

Coordinates: 40°32′00″N 77°41′59″W

- Township
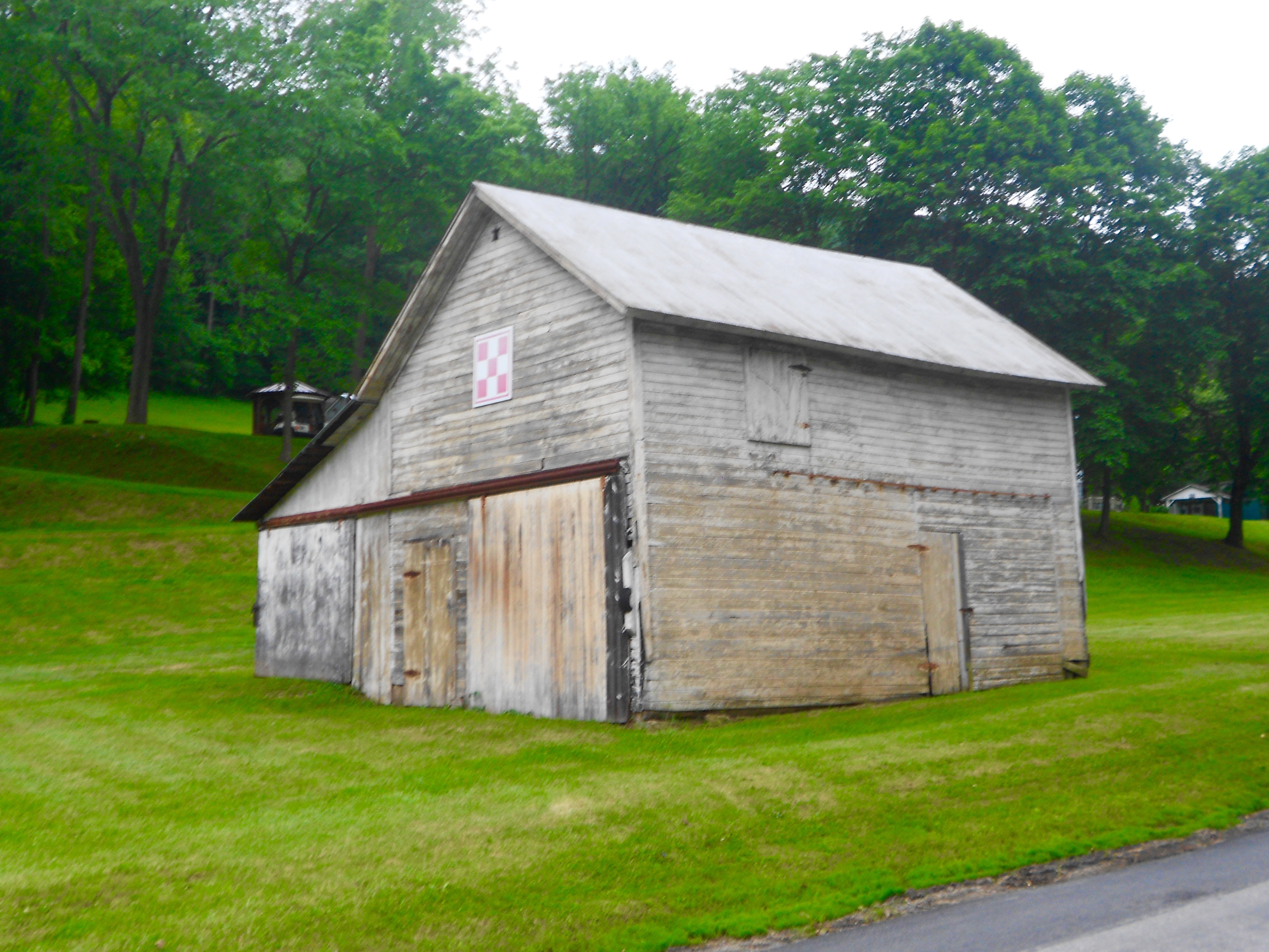
- Barn, northwest of McVeytown

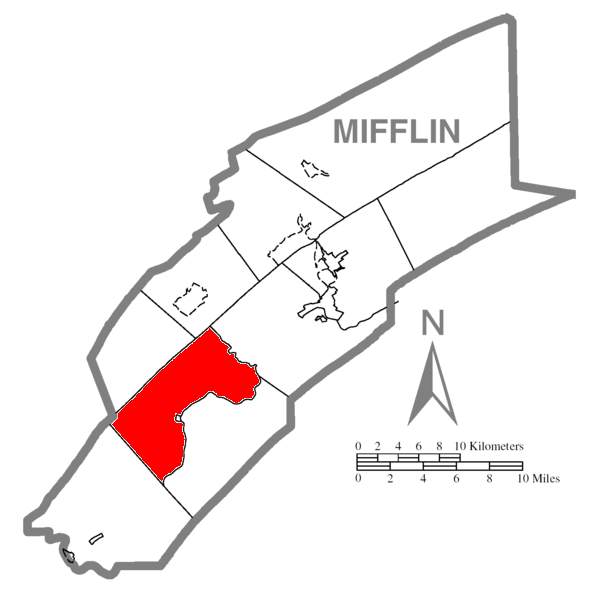
- Map of Mifflin County, Pennsylvania highlighting Oliver Township

- Map of Mifflin County, Pennsylvania
- Country: United States
- State: Pennsylvania
- County: Mifflin
- Settled: 1762
- Incorporated: 1835

Government
  - Type: Board of Supervisors
  - Chairman: Thomas G. White, Jr.
  - Supervisor: Francis D. Goss
  - Supervisor: Ryan J. Casner

Area
  - Total: 35.49 sq mi (91.93 km^{2})
  - Land: 34.98 sq mi (90.61 km^{2})
  - Water: 0.51 sq mi (1.31 km^{2})

Population (2020)
  - Total: 2,060 ▼
  - Estimate (2022): 2,042
  - Density: 62.6/sq mi (24.16/km^{2})
- Time zone: UTC-5 (Eastern (EST))
  - Summer (DST): UTC-4 (EDT)
- ZIP code: 17051
- Area code: 717
- FIPS code: 42-087-56720
- Local phone exchange: 899

Oliver Township is a township in Mifflin County, Pennsylvania, United States. The population was 2,060 at the time of the 2020 census.

== Geography ==
According to the United States Census Bureau, the township has a total area of 35.0 square miles (90.6 km^{2}), of which 34.5 square miles (89.4 km^{2}) is land and 0.4 square mile (1.1 km^{2}) (1.26%) is water. It contains the part of the census-designated place of Strodes Mills.

== Demographics ==
Historical population
Census	Pop.	Note	%±
2010	2,175		—
2020	2,060		−5.3%
2022 (est.)	2,042		−0.9%
U.S. Decennial Census

As of the census of 2000, there were 2,060 people, 804 households, and 601 families residing in the township.

The population density was 59.7 inhabitants per square mile (23.1/km^{2}). There were 962 housing units at an average density of 27.9 per square mile (10.8/km^{2}).

The racial makeup of the township was 99.51% White, 0.24% African American, 0.10% Asian, and 0.15% from two or more races. Hispanic or Latino of any race were 0.19% of the population.

There were 804 households, out of which 30.8% had children under the age of 18 living with them; 65.4% were married couples living together, 6.2% had a female householder with no husband present, and 25.2% were non-families. 23.4% of all households were made up of individuals, and 14.6% had someone living alone who was 65 years of age or older.

The average household size was 2.56 and the average family size was 2.99.

In the township the population was spread out, with 24.5% under the age of 18, 7.7% from 18 to 24, 26.8% from 25 to 44, 24.7% from 45 to 64, and 16.3% who were 65 years of age or older. The median age was 39 years.

For every 100 females, there were 96.0 males. For every 100 females age 18 and over, there were 95.1 males.

The median income for a household in the township was $34,583, and the median income for a family was $41,286. Males had a median income of $31,678 compared with that of $18,047 for females.

The per capita income for the township was $16,938.

Roughly 5.4% of families and 8.9% of the population were below the poverty line, including 10.0% of those under age 18 and 10.2% of those age 65 or over.
