= Western Maryland Rail Trail =

Rail trail in Maryland, United States

Coordinates: 39.6631°N 78.2318°W

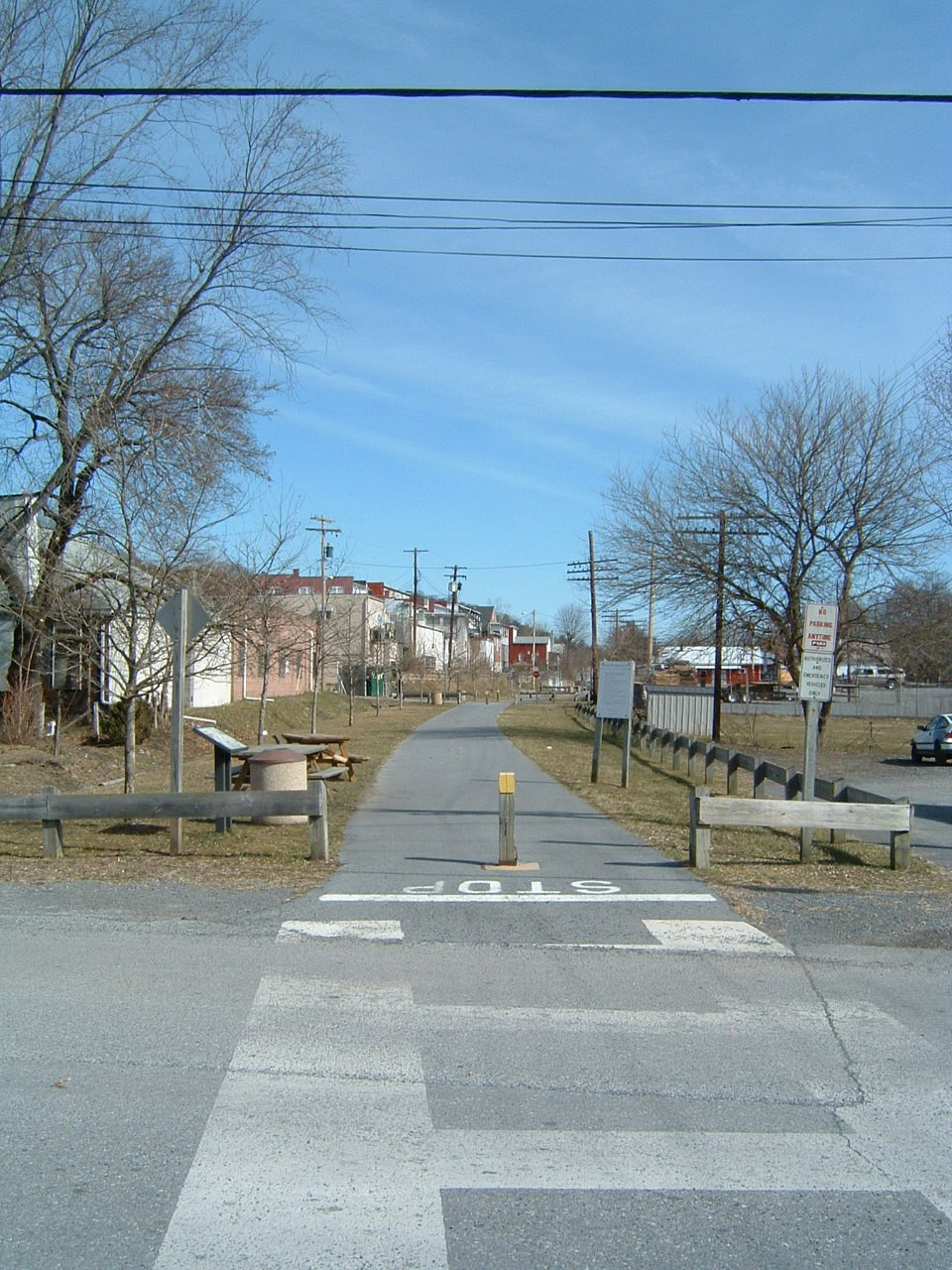
- The Western Maryland Rail Trail in Hancock, Maryland
- Length: 28 miles (45 km)
- Location: Maryland, United States
- Established: 1998

The Western Maryland Rail Trail (WMRT) is a 28-mile (45 km) shared-use rail trail in the U.S. state of Maryland that follows the former right-of-way of the Western Maryland Railway (WM) between Fort Frederick State Park and Little Orleans via Hancock, paralleling the C&O Canal and Potomac River. The asphalt-paved trail is suitable for walking, jogging, biking, rollerblading, cross-country skiing, and snowshoeing.

== History ==
The West Subdivision of the WM was abandoned in 1975 and its rails removed between Big Pool and Tonoloway in December 1988. The portion in C&O Canal National Park reverted to the National Park Service (NPS) in 1980.

In August 1990, the Maryland Department of Natural Resources purchased the right-of-way between a point 1/2 mile (0.80 km) west of Fort Frederick State Park and Little Orleans from CSX Transportation, the successor of the WM. Construction began on the first 10 mi (16 km) section between Fort Frederick and Hancock in 1997 and was completed in 1998. Construction on the next section, a 10.3 mi (16.6 km) extension from Hancock to Pollypon (a small body of water where canal boats would winter), began in 2001; it opened on June 10, 2002. Construction on the third section, a 2.1-mile (3.4 km) extension from Pollypon to Pearre Station, began in 2003; it opened in 2005. Construction on the fourth section, a 4.5-mile (7.2 km) extension from Pearre Station to Little Orleans that includes a 2 mi (3.2 km) bypass of the Indigo Tunnel via the C&O Canal, was funded in 2005 and started in 2017 after missing start dates in 2012, 2014, and 2016; it opened in 2019.

=== Little Orleans–Paw Paw ===
There have been plans to extend the trail from its current western terminus in Little Orleans to a point in Maryland opposite Paw Paw, WV. To traverse the Paw Paw Bends of the Potomac River in this section, the WM right of way has six major bridges and three tunnels – Indigo, Stickpile, and Kessler. After a 2008 study found bats living in the tunnels, an environmental assessment was undertaken to determine the feasibility of routing the trail through the tunnels. It determined that the Indigo tunnel houses the largest known bat refuge in Maryland and is the largest hibernaculum of five species of bats, including the Eastern Small-footed bat and the Indiana bat (both currently listed as endangered) as well as numerous other bats. In 2010, following a survey done in March of that year, Maryland state officials and the NPS agreed that the trail would bypass the Indigo Tunnel via the C&O Canal towpath to protect the tunnel's bat population.

In 2012, the NPS completed the environmental assessment for the extension from Pearre Station to Paw Paw. It included several alternatives that would extend the trail between 8.1 and 14.4 miles (13.0 and 23.2 km), including options to either run the trail through Stickpile Tunnel and Kessler Tunnel or build bypasses around them. The NPS chose to do neither and instead proposed extending the trail 7.2 mi (11.6 km) from Pearre Station to the eastern portal of Stickpile Tunnel where it would terminate, as well as adding a 0.9 mi (1.4 km) section from the WM bridge over the C&O Canal near Paw Paw to the Fifth Potomac Crossing bridge on the north side of Bevan Bend. While bypassing Stickpile Tunnel was possible, the topography around Kessler Tunnel was found to be too challenging and, as a result, the extension west of Little Orleans was placed on indefinite hold in 2014. By 2016, West Virginia had dropped out of the plan, so the proposed Little Orleans–Stickpile Tunnel and Paw Paw–Fifth Potomac Crossing bridge sections were scuttled.
