= Western Maryland Railroad Right-of-Way, Milepost 126 to Milepost 160 =

- U.S. National Register of Historic Places
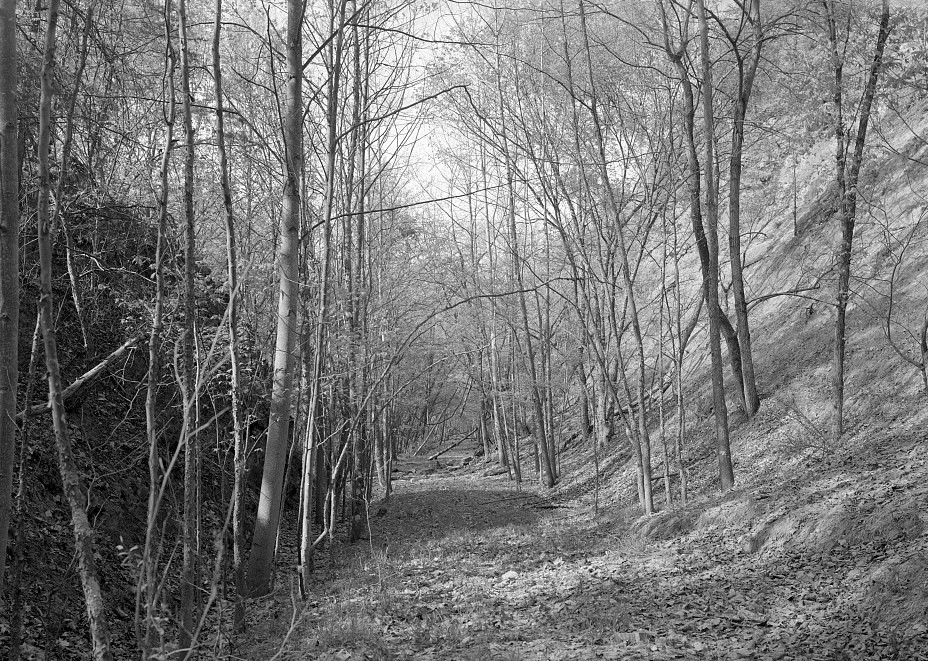
- Roadbed in cut west of Bridge No. 1416.

- Location within Maryland Location within the United States
- Nearest city: North Branch, Oldtown, Little Orleans and Woodmont in Maryland, and Jerome in West Virginia
- Coordinates: 39°37′34.3″N 78°23′10.4″W
- Area: 500 acres (200 ha)
- Built: 1903
- Built by: Western Maryland Railway Co.; Pennsylvania Steel Co.
- NRHP reference No.: 81000078
- Added to NRHP: July 23, 1981

Western Maryland Railroad Right-of-Way, Milepost 126 to Milepost 160 is a historic section of the Western Maryland Railway (WM) in Allegany County, Maryland, and Morgan County, West Virginia. It is an abandoned 34-mile (55 km) section of the right-of-way between milepost 126 at the intersection of the Chesapeake and Ohio (C&O) Canal and Long Ridge Road, Woodmont, and milepost 160 just west of Maryland Route 51, North Branch. It closely parallels the Potomac River and the C&O Canal, which runs along the north bank of the river, and includes three tunnels. Seven miles of the roadbed are in West Virginia near Paw Paw.

WM completed the line between Hagerstown and Cumberland, Maryland in 1906. It was abandoned by the Chessie System in 1975.

The National Park Service acquired the roadbed in 1980 for the C&O Canal National Historical Park. It was listed on the National Register of Historic Places in 1981. Towns it is listed in include North Branch, Oldtown, Little Orleans and Woodmont, Maryland, and Jerome, West Virginia.

== See also ==
- Indigo Tunnel
- Kessler Tunnel
- Stickpile Tunnel
