= Woodmont =

Woodmont may refer to a location in the United States:

- Woodmont, Connecticut
- Woodmont, Baltimore County, Maryland
- Woodmont, Montgomery County, Maryland
- Woodmont, Washington County, Maryland
- Woodmont (Gladwyne, Pennsylvania), a U.S. National Historic Landmark, former home of Father Divine
