= Paw Paw Tunnel =

Tunnel in Allegany County, Maryland

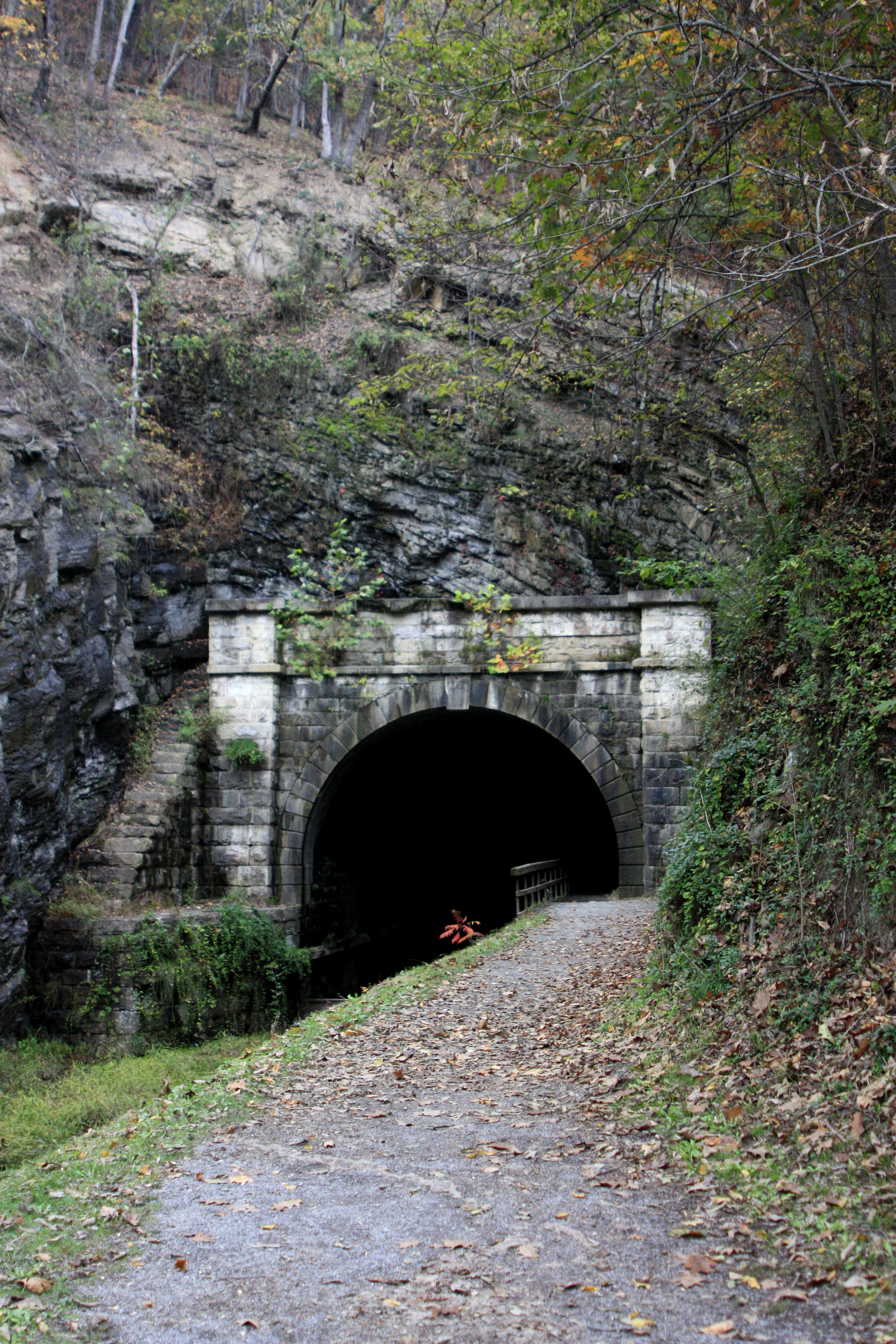
- Tunnel entrance
- Interactive map of Paw Paw Tunnel

Overview
- Location: Allegany County, Maryland, U.S.
- Coordinates: 39°33′20″N 78°27′46″W

Operation
- Work began: June 1836
- Opened: 1850
- Owner: National Park Service
- Traffic: Canal and towpath/trail
- Character: Boats, pedestrians, bicycles, horses

Technical
- Length: 3,118 feet (950 m)
- Tunnel clearance: 24 feet (7.3 m)
- Width: 27 feet (8.2 m)

The Paw Paw Tunnel is a 3,118-foot-long (950 m) canal tunnel on the Chesapeake and Ohio Canal (C&O) in Oldtown, Maryland, in Allegany County, Maryland. Located near Paw Paw, West Virginia, it was built to bypass the Paw Paw Bends, a six-mile (9.7 km) stretch of the Potomac River containing five horseshoe-shaped bends. The town, the bends, and the tunnel take their name from the pawpaw trees that grow prolifically along nearby ridges.

Built using more than six million bricks, the tunnel has been described as "the greatest engineering marvel along the Chesapeake & Ohio Canal National Historical Park." Located at milepost 155.2, the tunnel served to eliminate six miles of canal and is credited with contributing to the economic success of nearby Cumberland, Maryland.

Construction on the tunnel began in 1836 and was expected to be completed within two years at a total cost of $33,500. But the project proved far more complicated and costly than expected, and the tunnel did not open until 1850, more than a decade behind schedule.

The project was delayed for many reasons. Not only did the construction company underestimate the difficulty of the work, violence frequently broke out among immigrant laborers of different ethnicities, and wages often went unpaid due to the company's financial problems. By the time the tunnel was finally completed at a price of $600,000, it had nearly bankrupted the Chesapeake and Ohio Canal Company. Due to the high cost and long delay in completing the tunnel, the construction ended at Cumberland, Maryland, falling short of the original plan to take it all the way to Pittsburgh.

The tunnel was used by canal boats until the C&O closed in 1924. The tunnel and towpath are now maintained for public use as part of the Chesapeake and Ohio Canal National Historical Park. Though never one of the longest tunnels in the world, Paw Paw Tunnel remains one of the greatest engineering feats of its day.

== History ==
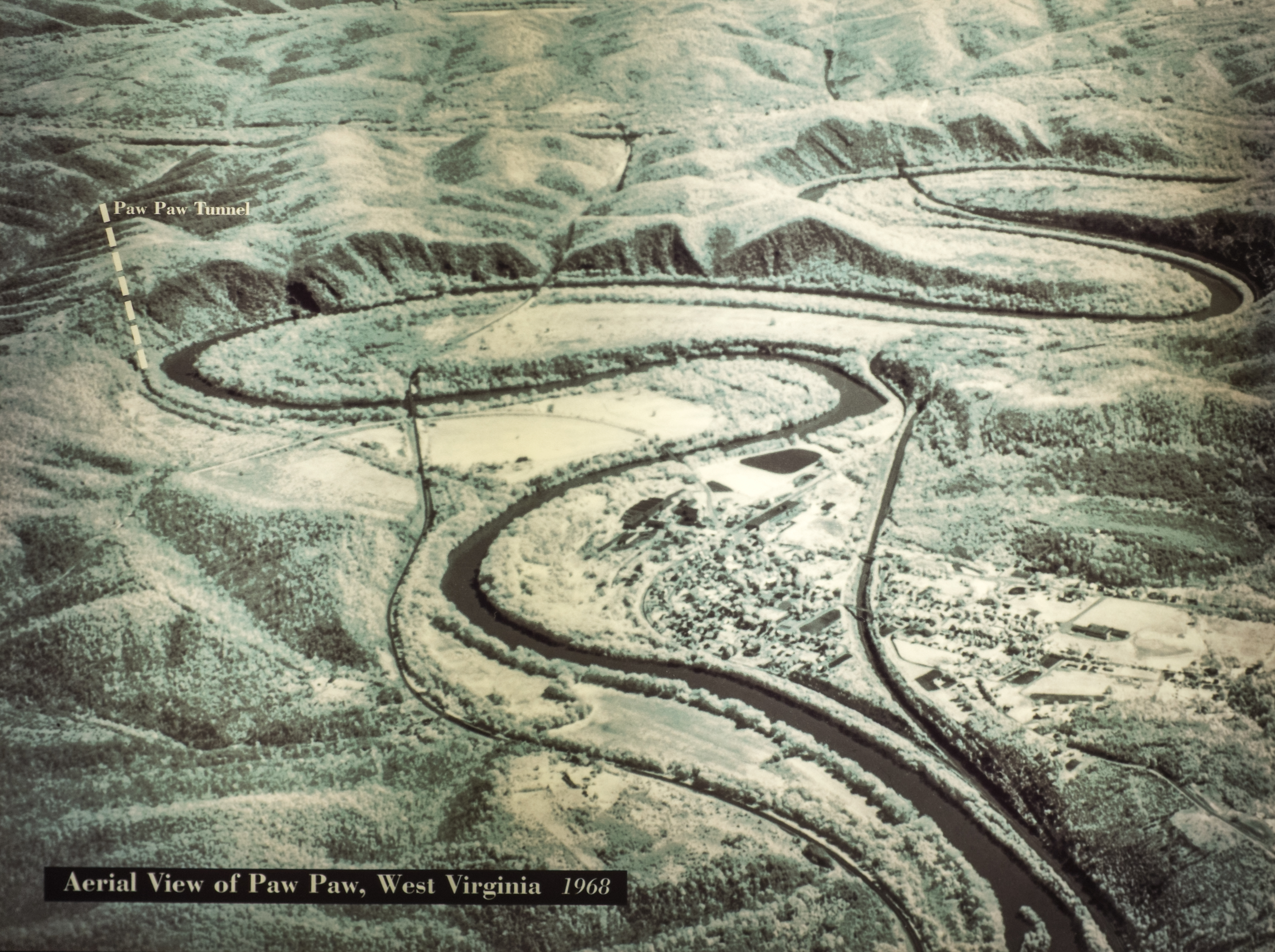
Aerial view of Paw Paw area. Tunnel is marked on photo. Note the cliffs on the Maryland (left) side of the river, which presented difficulties for the Canal planners

At Paw Paw, the canal engineers had a quandary with no easy solutions: follow the river (with its cliffs which would have required crossing over to West Virginia (then part of Virginia), damming the river to make a slackwater, and hacking out from the cliffs on the Maryland side) or make a tunnel. The newly appointed engineer, Charles B. Fisk, managed to convince the board of directors of a tunnel's superiority. The tunnel plan was approved in February 1836, with an expected completion date of July 1838.

Lee Montgomery, a Methodist minister who had experience from building the canal tunnel for the Union Canal was awarded the contract on March 15, 1836. Construction on the tunnel began in 1836. Unfortunately for Montgomery, the Irish workers were not skilled at tunnel work, so he obtained English masons, English and Welsh miners, and some "Dutch" [i.e. German] labourers. More unfortunately, this caused ethnic tensions which exploded into violence in 1837 and 1838, specifically between the Irish and everyone else; rioters destroyed the tavern at Oldtown, burned shanties, and the like. There were more riots in 1839 at Little Orleans. Montgomery succeeded in boring the tunnel through on June 5, 1840, at a point 1,505 feet (459 m) from the south portal, but did not finish it.

Due to construction and financial problems, no work was done from 1841 to 1847.

In 1848, a subcontract was let to McCulloch and Day to finish the tunnel. The tunnel was opened for traffic (and essentially completed) in 1850, but the brick liner was not finished until after the tunnel was opened. The construction costs were $616,478.65, much more than had originally been budgeted.

In 1872, a semaphore signal was installed at the west end of the tunnel to control traffic.

== Boatmen and the tunnel ==
Film (part 2) which includes footage of the Paw Paw tunnel (at 0:30) during Canal Operating days. Some information in the film is incorrect: the tunnel was in use since 1850, not 1840, and is 3,118 feet (950 m) long, not a mile long.

Boatmen could usually tell if another boat was in the tunnel because the water level would be down about four inches (10 cm). The loaded boat going downstream had the right of way, but that was not often honored, and there were occasional fistfights between rival boatmen over the right of way.

The tunnel was so narrow that nobody could pass between the mules and the side of the tunnel. There are records of passengers playing music (to hear the echo) or singing in the tunnel to keep up their courage.

== The tunnel today ==
Today the Paw Paw Tunnel can be easily explored with a flashlight, as the towpath is still intact. Trekkers can return via the tunnel, or hike back over the two-mile-long (3.2 km) Tunnel Hill Trail. This passes interpretive markers about the German and Irish workers who lived along the path during the tunnel's construction.

A rockslide in January 2013 closed the trail east of the tunnel for four months, so the tunnel could not be reached from the east side. It reopened on April 17, 2013.

The NPS started a two-phase construction project to fix the scaling of rock on the downstream tunnel approach in 2017. The first phase, which addressed the most urgent sections of the deteriorating rock slope, has been completed. The second phase will begin the first week of May 2019 and will address additional hazards downstream of the newly completed section. The cost is listed as $750,000.

== Gallery ==
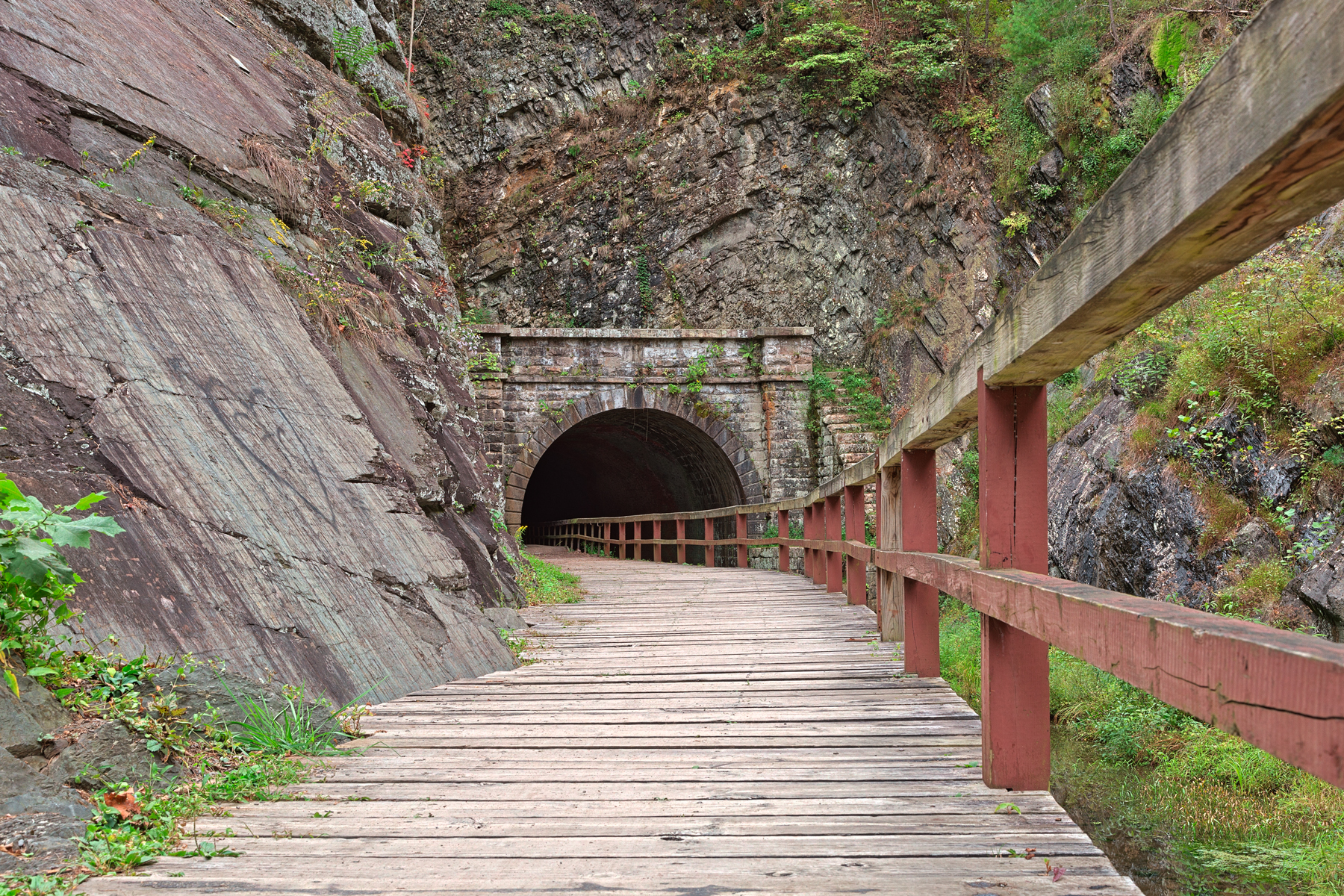
Downstream (north) side of tunnel

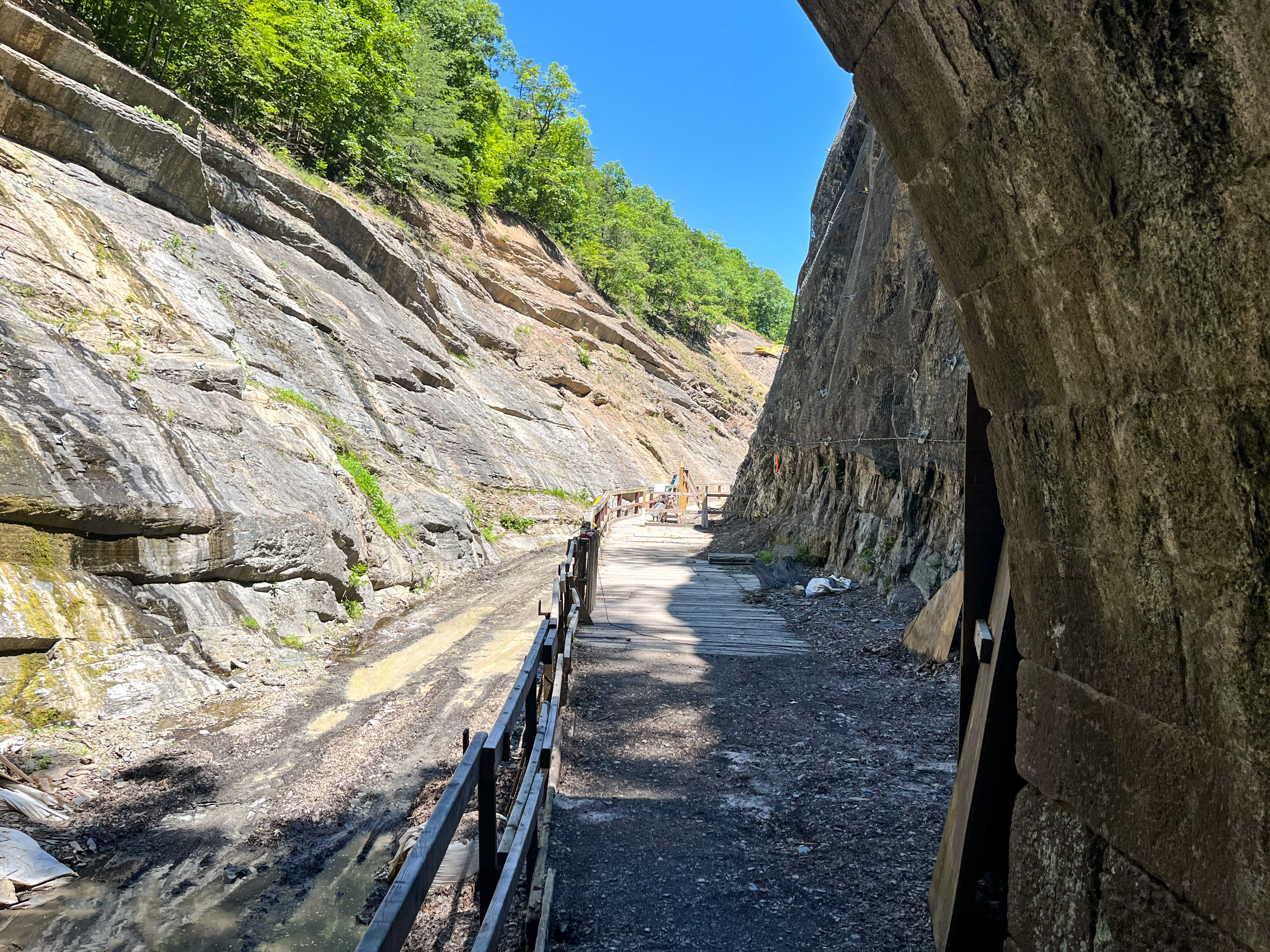
Looking out from north side of tunnel

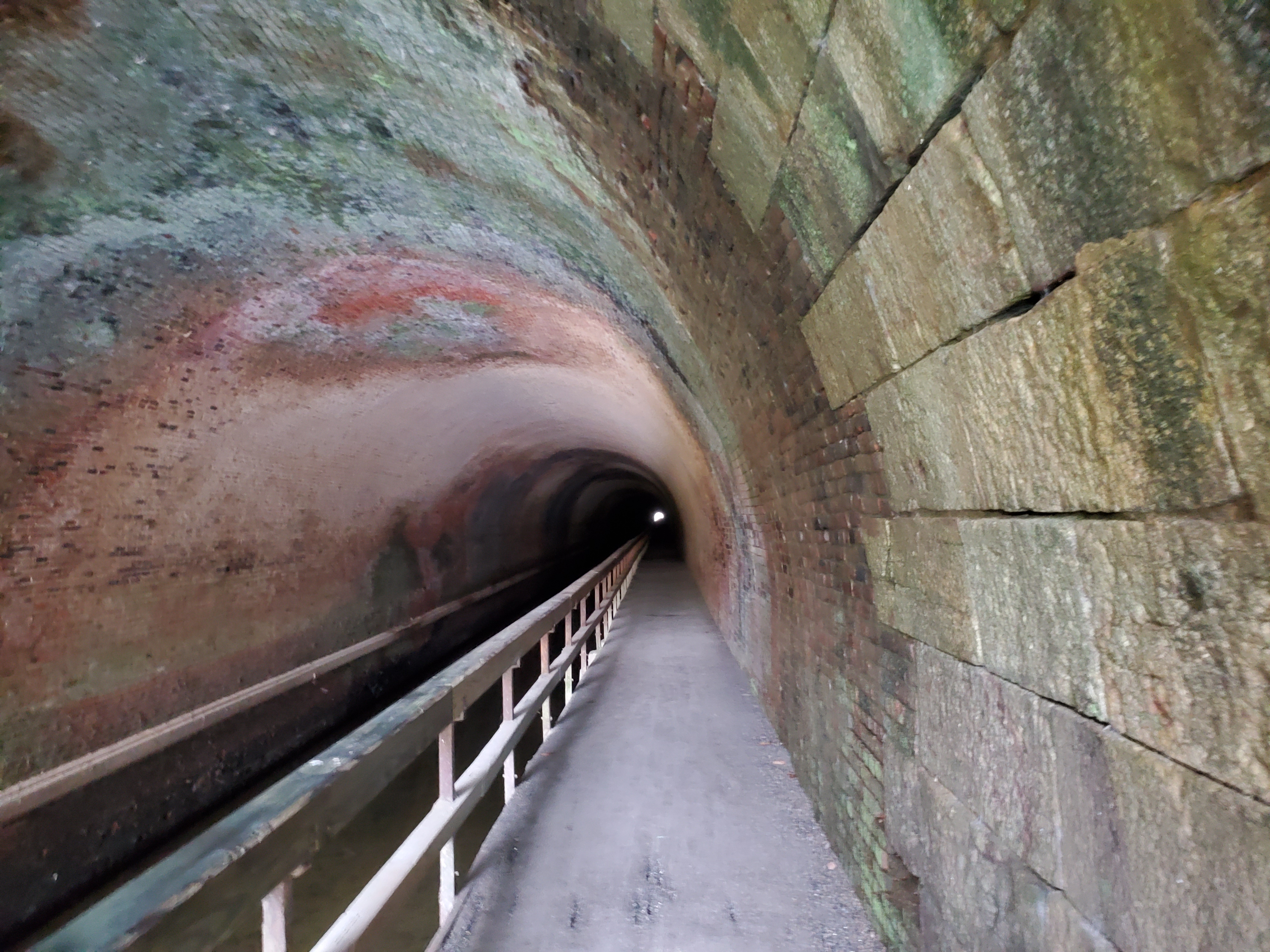
Looking north through the Paw Paw Tunnel

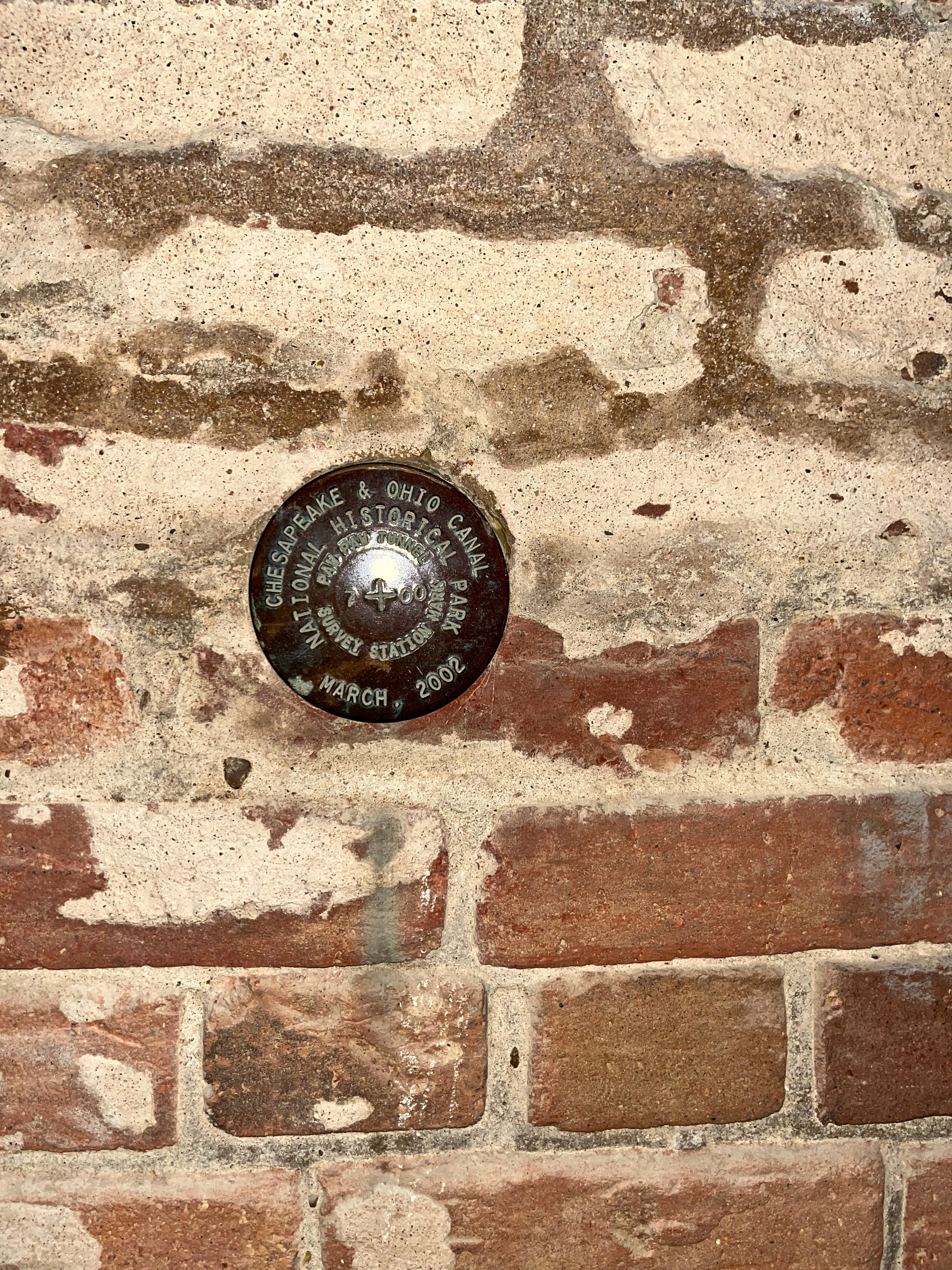
NPS Survey marker on the wall (towpath side) of the tunnel

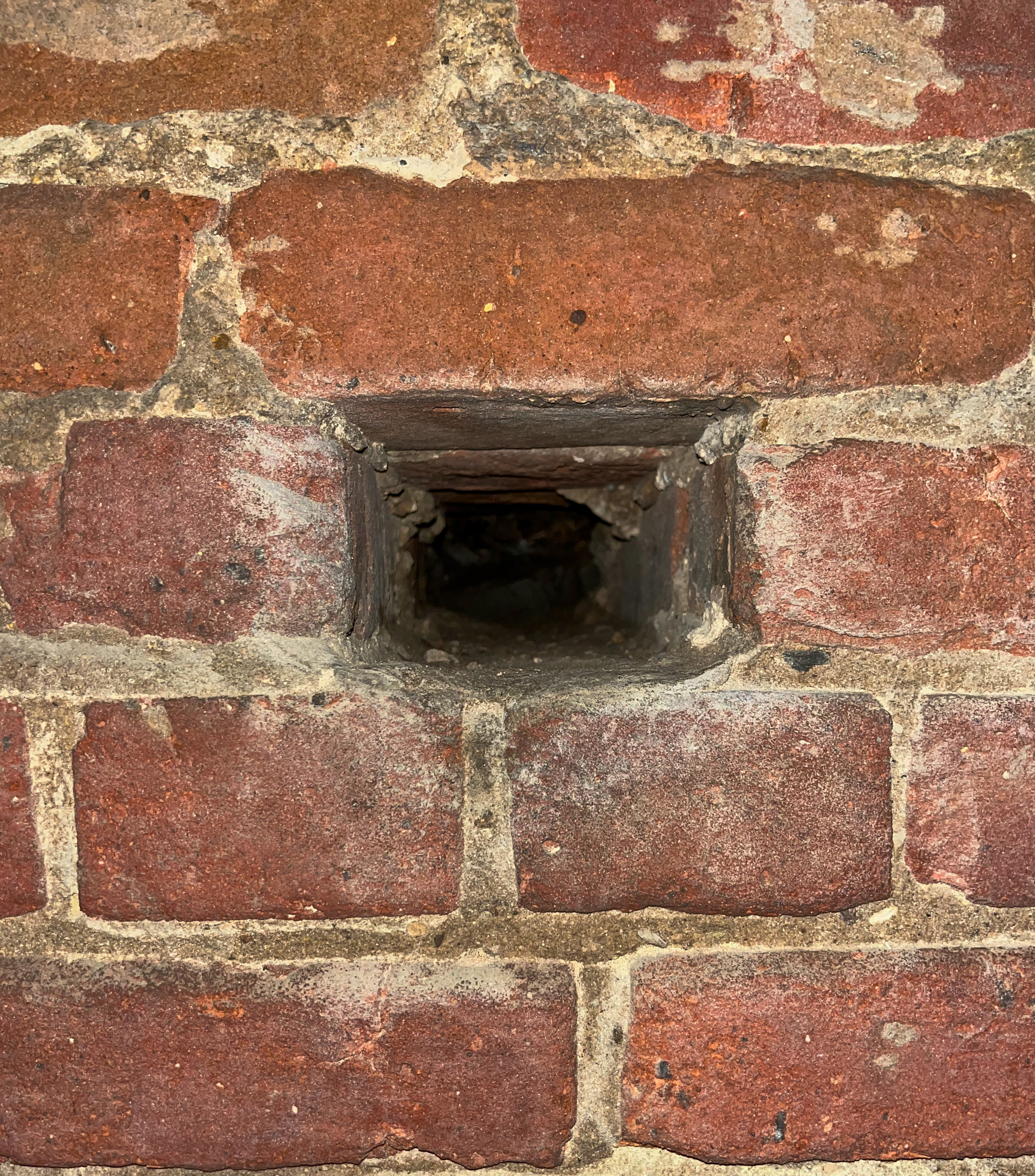
Hole or space in brick lining. There are many of these.

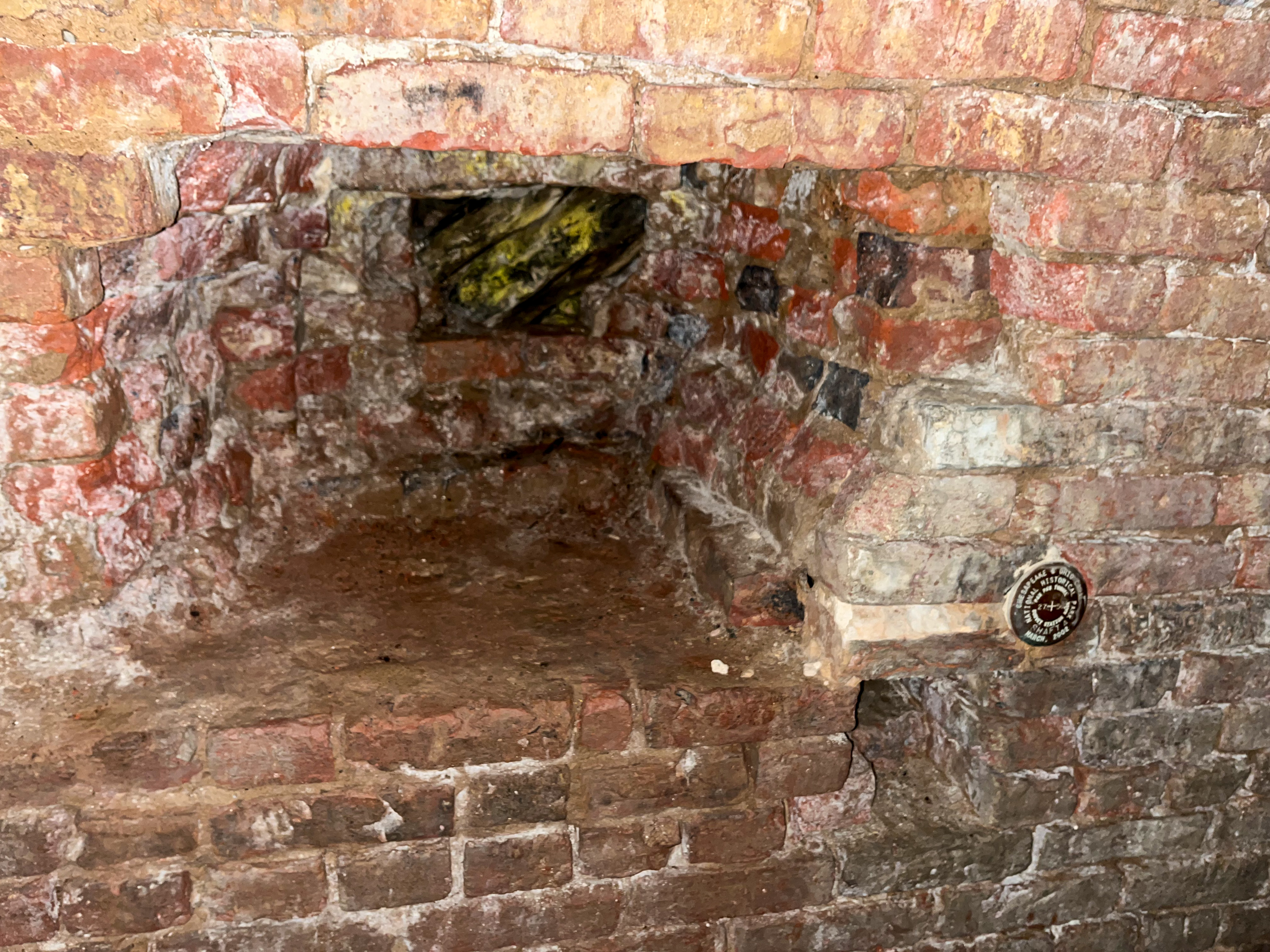
This large hole gives an idea how thick the brick lining is. Note survey marker.

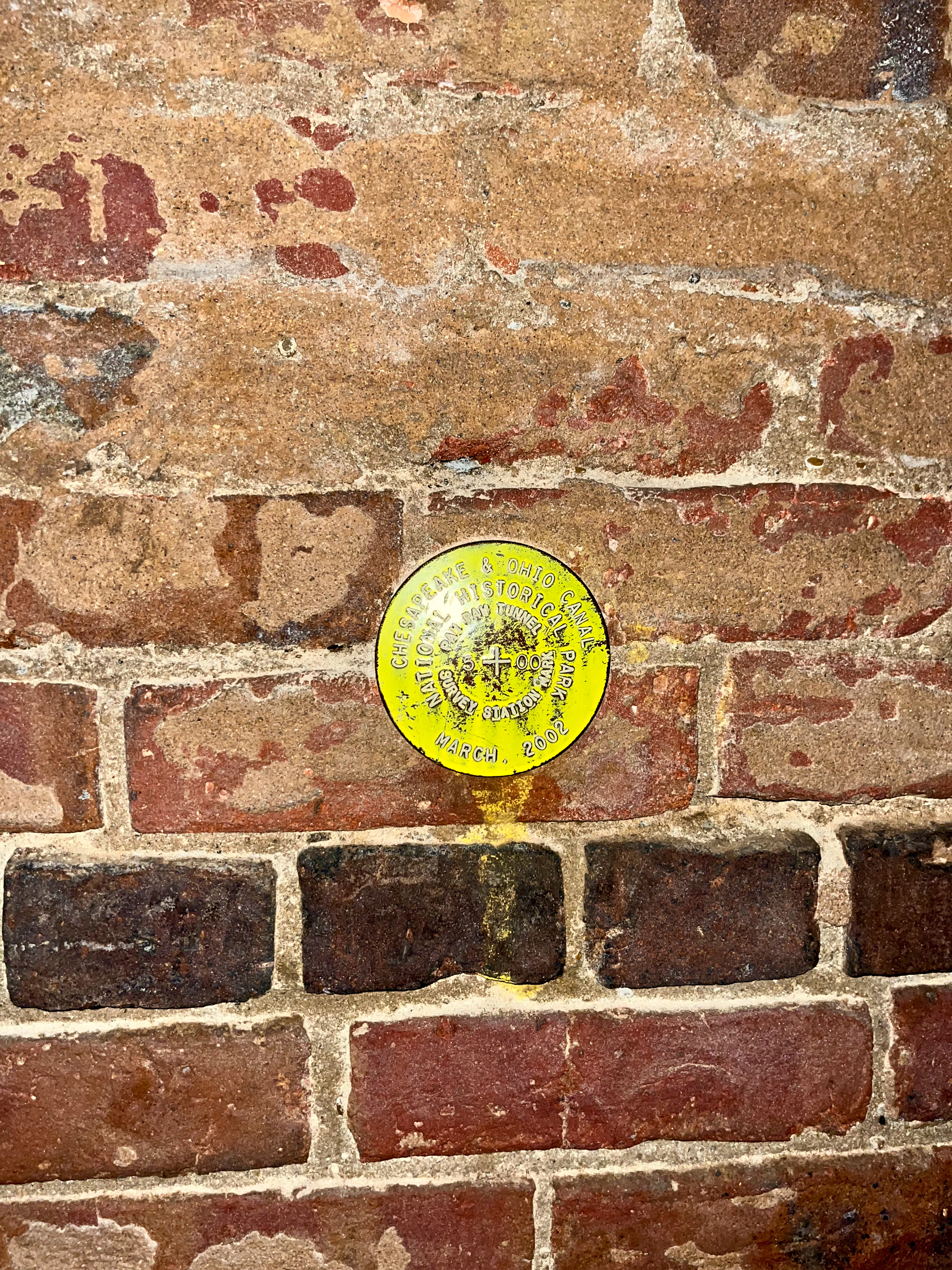
Another survey marker, painted yellow

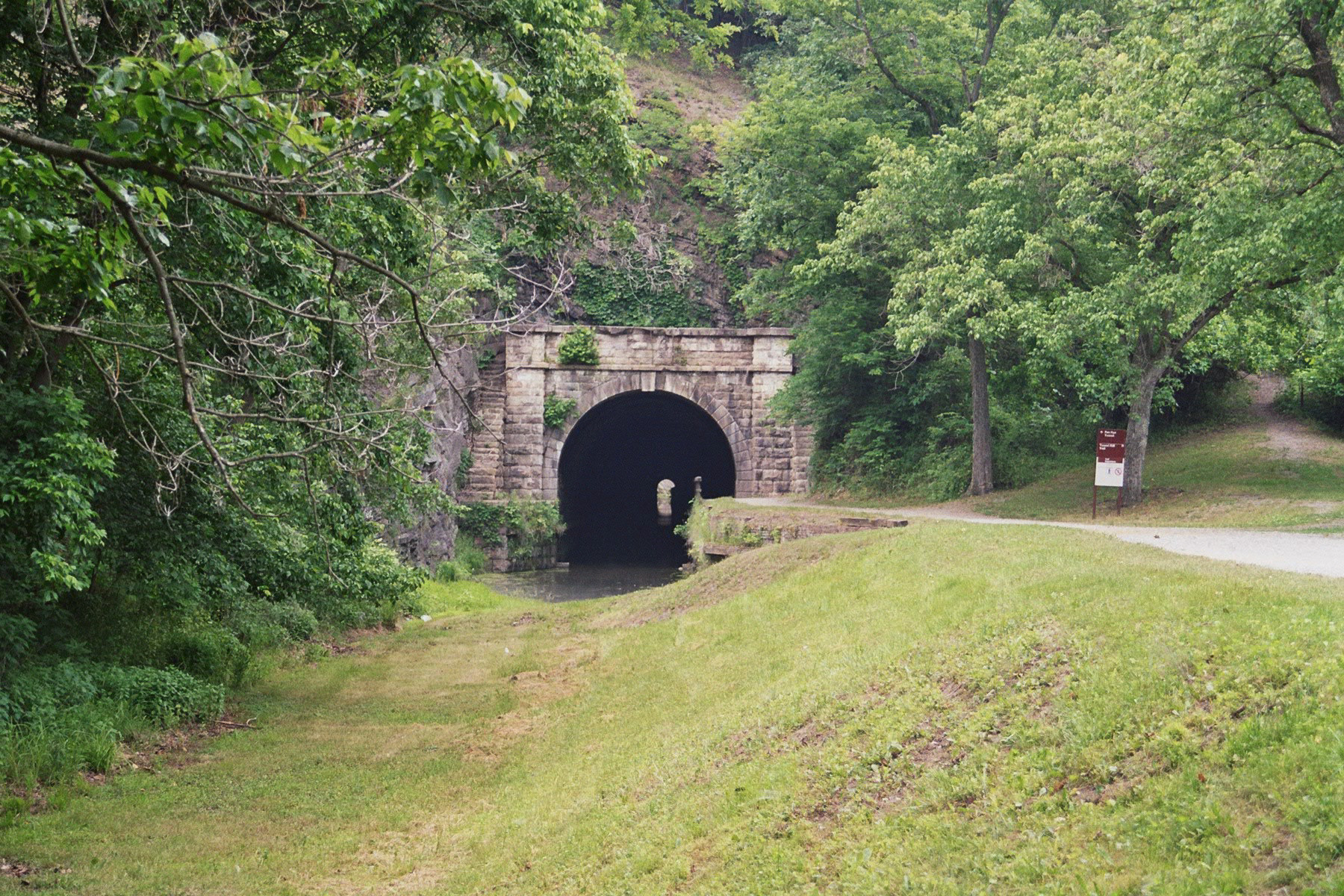
Another view of the upstream side of the tunnel

== See also ==
- Chesapeake and Ohio Canal National Historical Park
