= Indigo Tunnel =

Abandoned railroad tunnel in Allegany County, Maryland, US

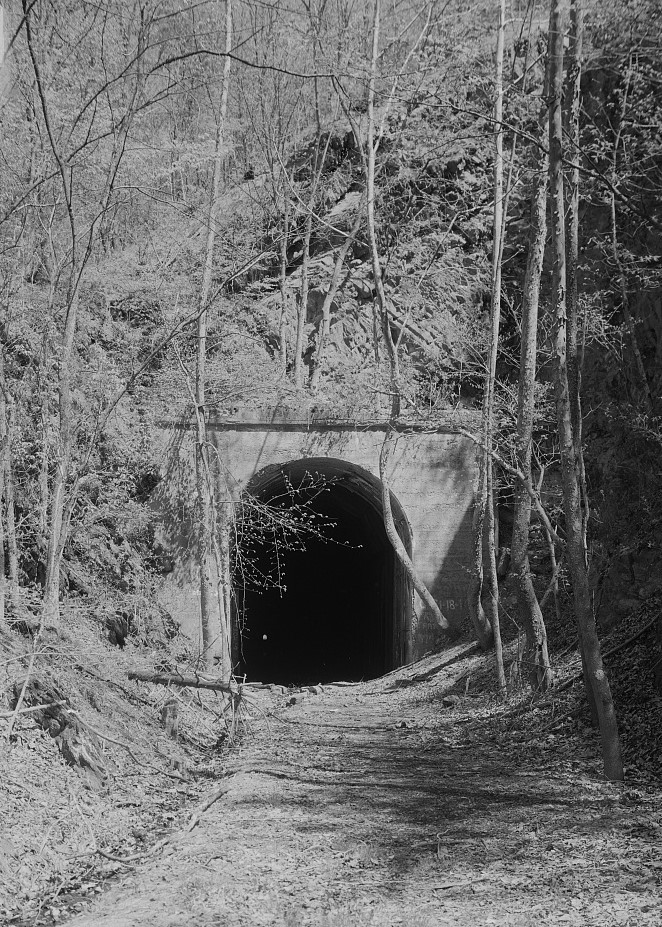
- West portal of the Indigo Tunnel.
- Interactive map of Indigo Tunnel

Overview
- Line: West Subdivision
- Location: Little Orleans, Maryland
- Coordinates: 39.639207°N 78.360929°W
- Status: Abandoned
- System: Western Maryland Railway

Operation
- Opened: 1904
- Closed: 1975
- Owner: WM
- Traffic: Train
- Character: Freight and Passenger

Technical
- Length: 4,350 ft (1,330 m)
- No. of tracks: Single
- Track gauge: 1,435 mm (4 ft 8 1/2 in) standard gauge
- Max elevation: 482.8 ft (147.2 m)
- Grade: 0.24 %

Indigo Tunnel is an abandoned railroad tunnel in Allegany County, Maryland, located about 1 mile (1.6 km) east of Little Orleans. Built by the Western Maryland Railway (WM) in 1904 as part of its Cumberland Extension project from Hagerstown west to Cumberland along the Potomac River valley, which involved construction of four additional tunnels and 23 bridges, Indigo was the WM's longest tunnel. The new rail line opened in 1906. Trains ran through the tunnel until the rail line was abandoned by the newly formed Chessie System in 1975, in favor of the parallel Baltimore and Ohio Railroad line on the opposite side of the Potomac River.

The tunnel was acquired by the National Park Service in 1980 and became part of Chesapeake and Ohio Canal National Historical Park. In 2010, the Park Service identified bat colonies living in the tunnel and closed the tunnel to the public in order to protect the colonies.

The tunnel and adjoining right of way were sold to the State of Maryland to be developed as the Western Maryland Rail Trail (WMRT). The section of WMRT that includes the tunnel opened in 2019, but due to an endangered bat species that inhabits the tunnel, it remains closed to the public. The Park Service installed gates at the tunnel portals to protect the bat habitat. The WMRT bypasses the tunnel via the C&O Canal and towpath–rail trail connections that were constructed near each of the portals.

== See also ==
- Allegheny Highlands Trail of Maryland
- Kessler Tunnel
- Stickpile Tunnel
- Western Maryland Railroad Right-of-Way, Milepost 126 to Milepost 160
