= Saint Charles Catholic Mission Church =

- St. Charles Catholic Mission Church
- U.S. National Register of Historic Places
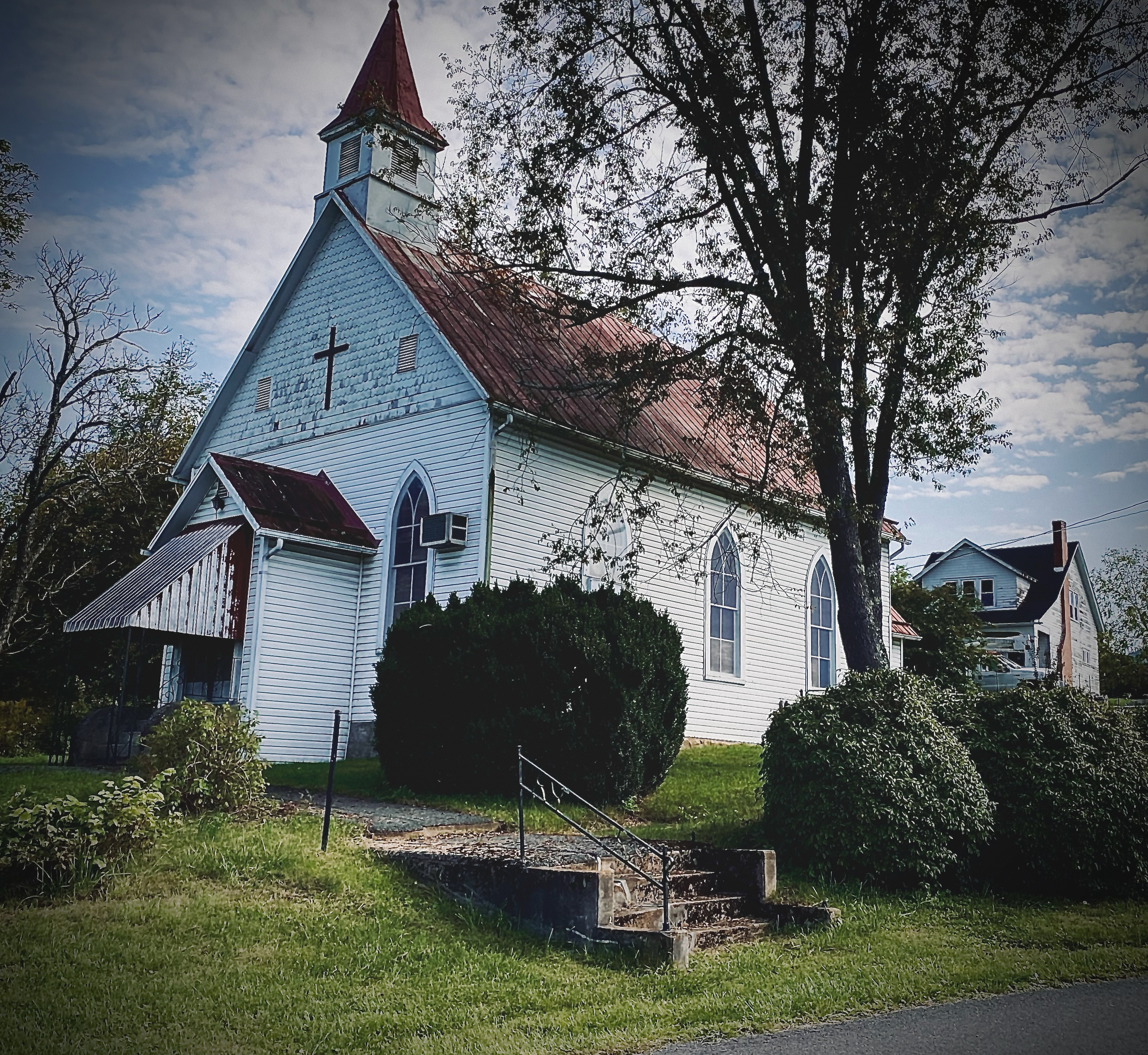
- Saint Charles Catholic Mission Church. October 2, 2023

- Location within Eastern Panhandle of West Virginia Location within West Virginia Location within the United States
- Location: Winchester St., Paw Paw, West Virginia
- Coordinates: 39°31′57″N 78°27′28″W
- Built: 1876
- Architectural style: Simple Gothic Revival
- NRHP reference No.: 100010184
- Added to NRHP: March 28, 2024

The former Saint Charles Catholic Mission Church is an historic building in Paw Paw, Morgan County, West Virginia. It was built in 1876 in a simple Gothic Revival architectural style. It is a rectangular one story woodframe building on a stone foundation. The building served as a place of worship for a small number of Catholic families until 1994.

Per an article in the June 20, 2023 edition of the Morgan Messenger, the firm Practical Preservation in 2021 conducted an historic property survey of Paw Paw, WV and completed a recommendation of eligibility report. The report noted the former Paw Paw Old Mayor's Office and Jail on Lee St., the former St. Charles Catholic Church, and the Paw Paw Train Depot were worthy of individual nominations to the National Register,

It was individually listed on the National Register of Historic Places on March 28, 2024, and is the town's second entry on the National Register.
