= Stickpile Tunnel =

Abandoned railroad tunnel in Allegany County, Maryland, US

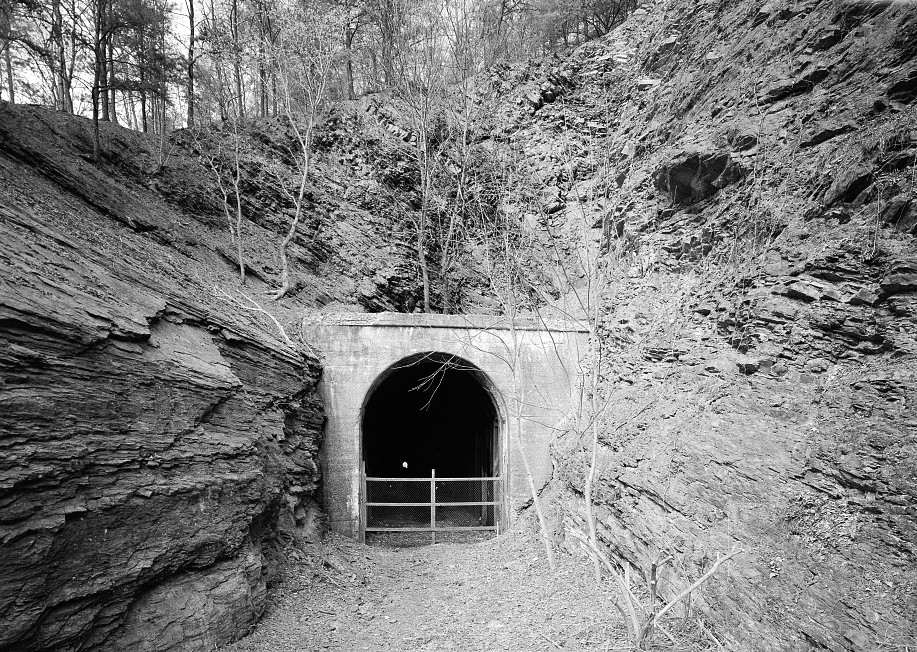
- West portal of Stick Pile Tunnel in 2017
- Interactive map of Stickpile Tunnel

Overview
- Line: West Subdivision
- Location: Little Orleans, Maryland
- Coordinates: 39.596°N 78.428°W
- Status: Abandoned
- System: Western Maryland Railway

Operation
- Opened: 1906
- Closed: 1975
- Owner: WM
- Traffic: Train
- Character: Freight and Passenger

Technical
- Length: 1,706.5 ft (520.1 m)
- No. of tracks: Single
- Track gauge: 1,435 mm (4 ft 8 1/2 in) standard gauge
- Max elevation: 522.2 ft (159.2 m)
- Grade: 0.5%

Stickpile Tunnel, also known as Greenridge Tunnel, is an abandoned railroad tunnel in Allegany County, Maryland, located about 2.5 miles (4.0 km) southwest of Little Orleans. It was built by the Western Maryland Railway (WM) in 1906. It was constructed with concrete arch portals and the roof has wood planking.

The tunnel was part of a major WM project to extend its rail system from Hagerstown west to Cumberland. The difficult route followed the Potomac River valley and involved construction of four additional tunnels and 23 bridges. The new rail line opened for traffic in 1906. Trains ran through the tunnel until 1975 and the rail line was abandoned that same year.

Green Ridge, West Virginia, an abandoned railroad town, was located near the western portal of the tunnel, across the Potomac River.

The National Park Service acquired the tunnel and adjacent portions of the WM right of way in 1980. The site is part of Chesapeake and Ohio Canal National Historical Park.

== See also ==
- Indigo Tunnel
- Kessler Tunnel
- Western Maryland Railroad Right-of-Way, Milepost 126 to Milepost 160
