= Senator P. E. Nixon House =

- U.S. National Register of Historic Places
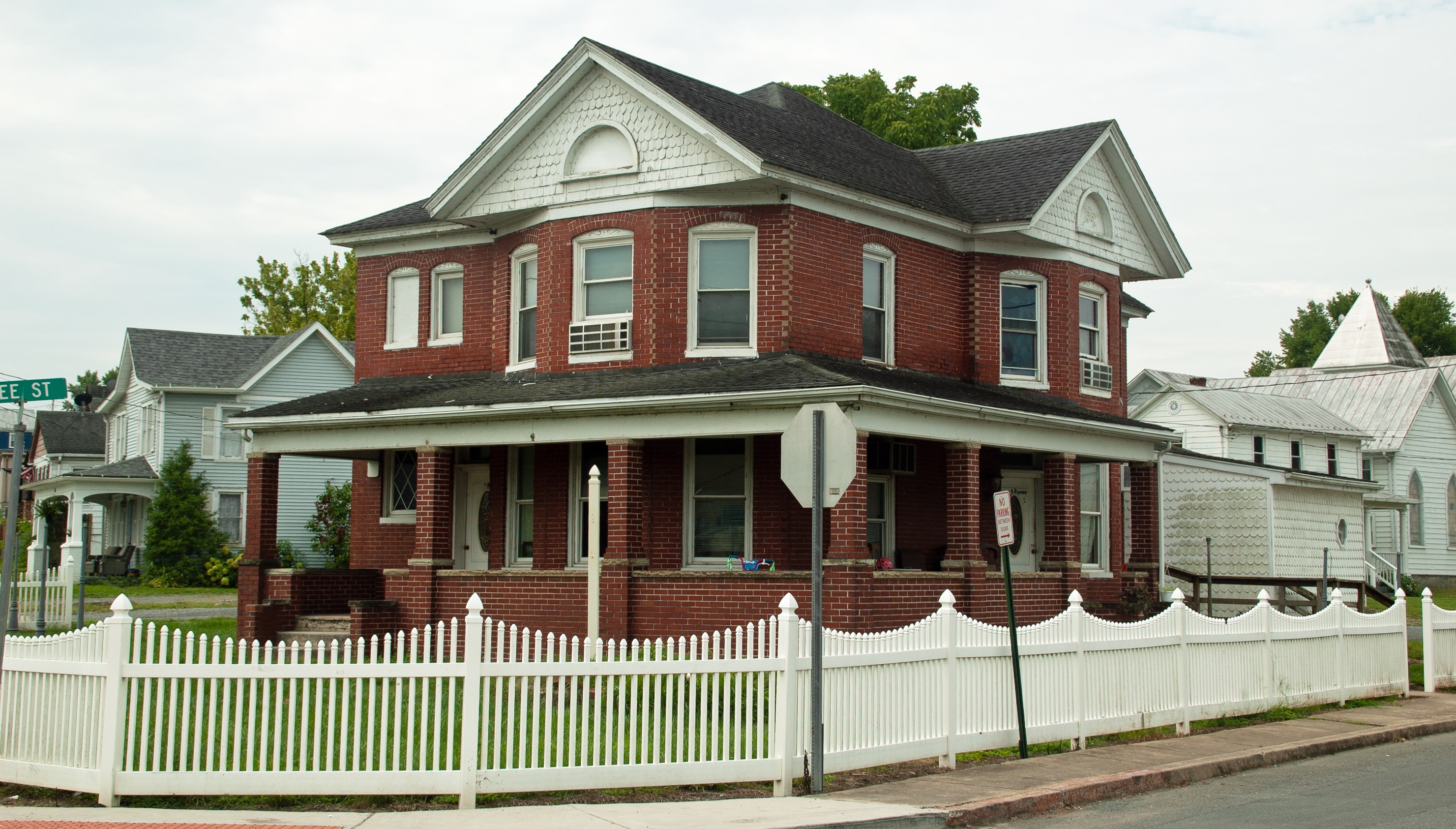
- Senator P. E. Nixon House. September 2024

- Location within Eastern Panhandle of West Virginia Location within West Virginia Location within the United States
- Location: 40 Winchester St., Paw Paw, West Virginia
- Coordinates: 39°32′02″N 78°27′32″W
- Built: 1909
- Architectural style: Queen Anne
- NRHP reference No.: 100011008
- Added to NRHP: November 15, 2024

The Senator P. E. Nixon House is a historic building in Paw Paw, Morgan County, West Virginia. It was built in 1909 by local builder Fowler Hott in a simple Queen Anne Style.

== Description ==
The 3,000 SF home was constructed of red brick on a raised concrete foundation. The home was the residence of prominent local businessman and WV State Senator Nixon and his wife Eva. Although P. E. Nixon died in 1942 the house remained owned and occupied by Eva Nixon until her death in 1954. Only three substantial brick homes were built in Paw Paw - all in a very similar “grand” style - and all for prominent and successful businessmen: P. E. Nixon, 1909; Samuel Moser, c. 1914; and D. G. Bevans, c. 1914. These more prominent brick homes likely reflected a growing prosperity in Paw Paw, at least for business owners in the early years of the 20th century. Of the three brick homes, two are still standing. The third, the Bevans home, after sitting empty for many years and suffering a fire, was demolished around 2020.

The Senator P. E. Nixon House was one of 20 new historic sites in WV added to the National Register of Historic Places in 2024 and one of three in the town of Paw Paw. As part of the year-end wrap up Cody Straley, Structural Historian - National Register and Architectural Survey Coordinator, and contributing editor at WV Explorer wrote: “[Nixon] was instrumental in erecting a bridge across the Potomac River, linking Paw Paw to Maryland. He also owned the town's oldest and most popular general store for many years”.

It was individually listed on the National Register of Historic Places on November 15, 2024, and is the town's fourth entry on the National Register in a period of 12 months.
