= Paw Paw Black School =

- U.S. National Register of Historic Places
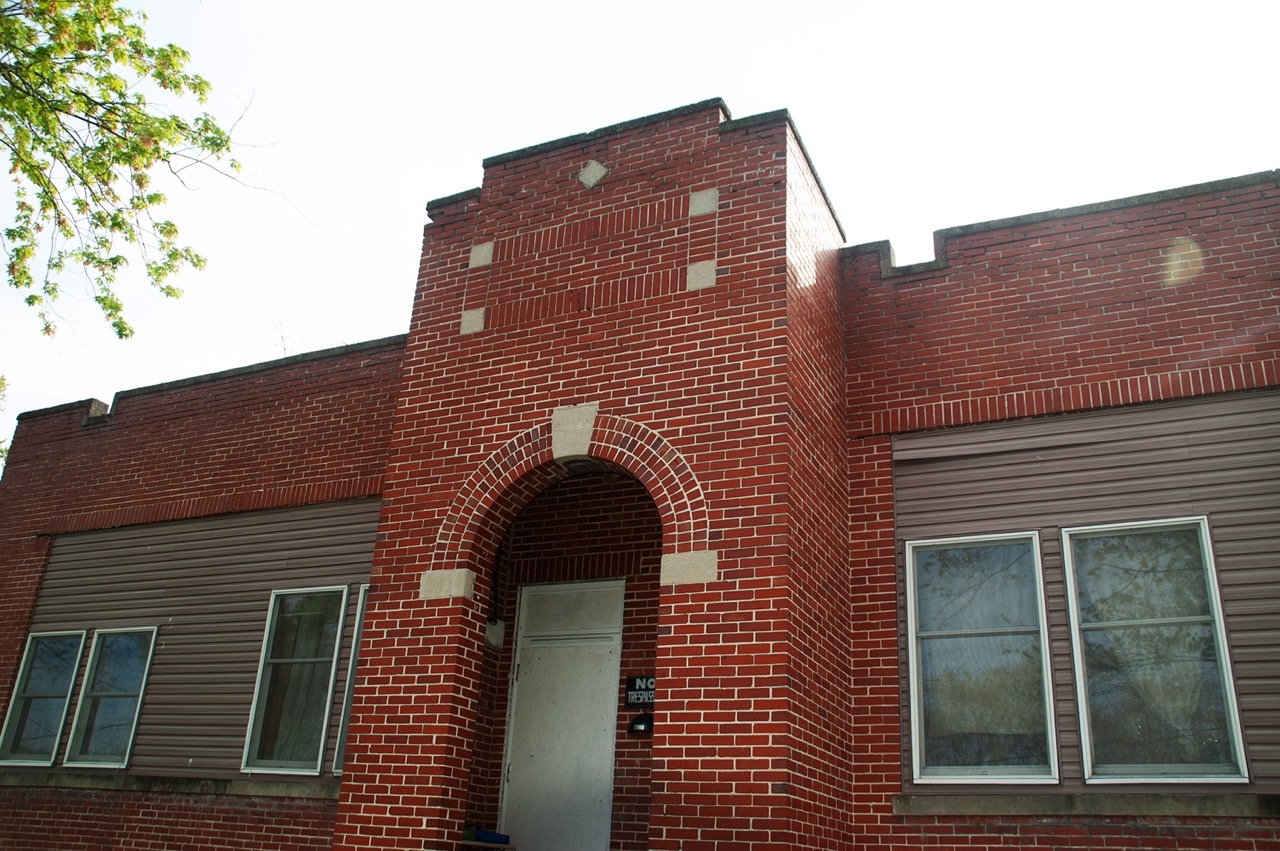
- Paw Paw Black School, April 23, 2024

- Location within Eastern Panhandle of West Virginia Location within West Virginia Location within the United States
- Location: Amelia St., Paw Paw, West Virginia
- Coordinates: 39°31′53″N 78°27′34″W
- Built: 1928
- Architect: Raymond Hunter (builder)
- Architectural style: Collegiate Gothic
- NRHP reference No.: 100010588
- Added to NRHP: July 17, 2024

The Paw Paw Black School is an historic building in Paw Paw, Morgan County, West Virginia. It was built in 1928 by local builder Raymond Hunter from Berkeley Springs, WV in a Collegiate Gothic Revival Style. It is a rectangular brick faced building over hollow ribbed terracotta blocks on a raised concrete foundation. The building taught African-American students through the 8th grade until 1954 when "separate but equal" was declared unconstitutional. The building also served as the social and civic center for the small African American community.

In its 13 August 2014 issue the Morgan Messenger published an article about the Paw Paw Black School titled "Paw Paw Black School was a Historic School of Excellence". This article discussed the quality of the education that was provided for black students during the years the school was open.

It was individually listed on the National Register of Historic Places on July 17, 2024, and is the town's third entry on the National Register.
