= Fort Frederick State Park =

State park in Maryland, US

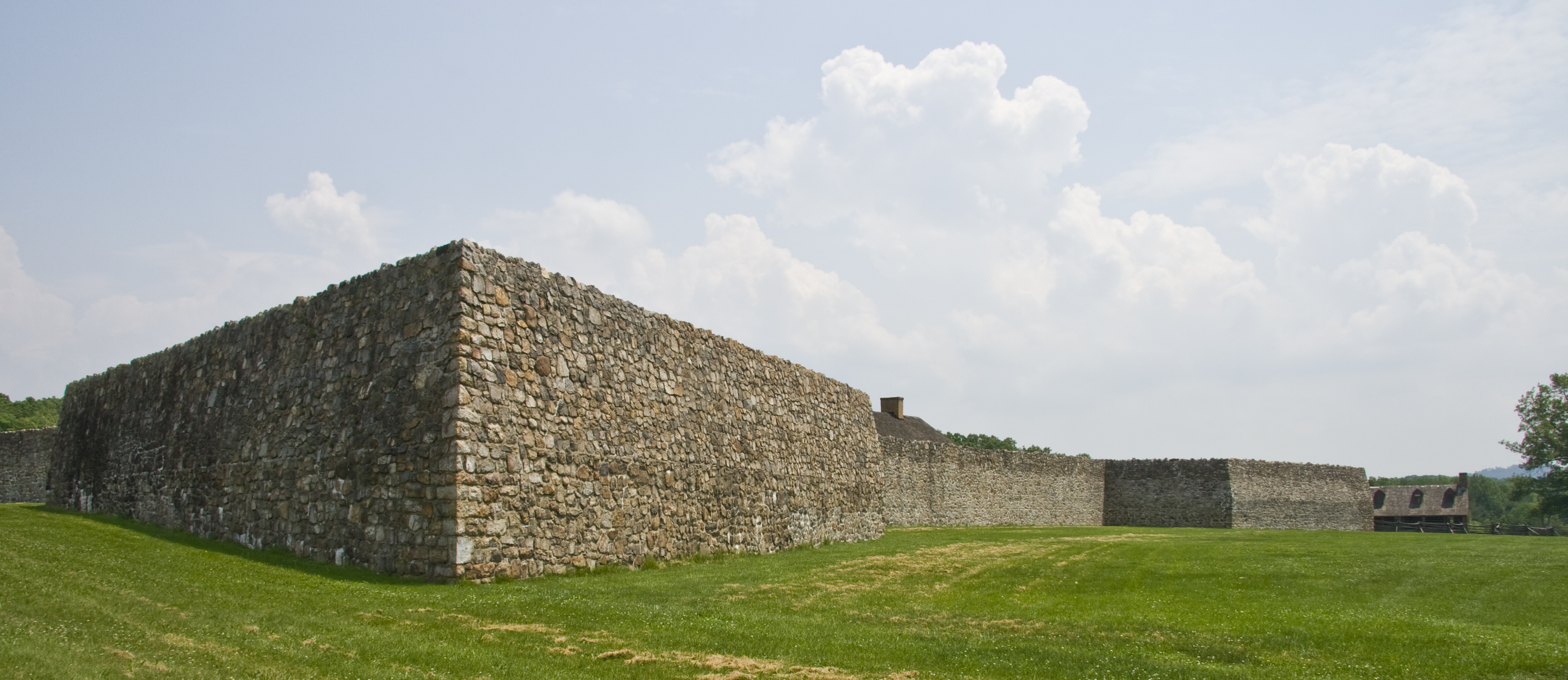

- Location within Maryland
- Location: Washington County, Maryland, United States
- Nearest town: Big Pool, Maryland
- Coordinates: 39°36′37″N 78°00′13″W
- Area: 722 acres (292 ha)
- Elevation: 472 ft (144 m)
- Established: 1922
- Administrator: Maryland Department of Natural Resources
- Designation: Maryland state park
- Website: Official website
- Fort Frederick
- U.S. National Register of Historic Places
- U.S. National Historic Landmark
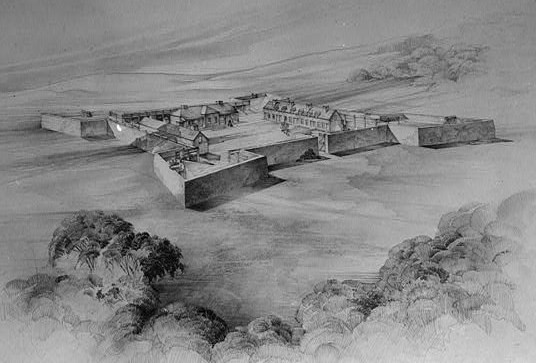
- Rendering of Fort Frederick as it may have appeared in the 18th century
- Location: Washington County, Maryland, USA
- Nearest city: Big Pool, Maryland
- Area: 287 acres (116 ha)
- Built: 1756-58
- NRHP reference No.: 73000939

Significant dates
- Added to NRHP: November 7, 1973
- Designated NHL: November 7, 1973

Fort Frederick State Park is a Maryland state park on the Potomac River surrounding the restored Fort Frederick, a fortification active in the French and Indian War (1754–1763) and the American Revolutionary War (1775-1783). The park lies south of the town of Big Pool, Maryland. The Chesapeake and Ohio Canal runs through the park grounds. The site was designated a National Historic Landmark in 1973.

== History ==
=== French and Indian War ===
Fort Frederick was built in 1756-57 by the colony of Maryland. During the French and Indian War in 1756, a £6000 appropriation was authorized by the Maryland Legislature at the request of Governor Horatio Sharpe to build a fortification on the frontier. The fort, named after Frederick Calvert, 6th Baron Baltimore, was completed the following year. The design of the fort conforms to the style developed early in the 18th century by Sebastien de Vauban, a French military engineer who is considered the father of modern fortification.

The large stone fort was designed primarily as a place of refuge for area settlers. Between 1757 and 1758, small raids by Native people in nearby settlements caused settlers in the surrounding countryside to flee eastward. At the same time men of the 60th Regiment of Foot and local militia soldiers garrisoned the fort. Ranging parties were sent from the fort to patrol the area and to deter if not prevent raids by Native Americans.

The fort was not designed to resist artillery, as it was correctly assumed that the French would not be able to transport artillery to the remote location from the west. The fort served its purpose in 1763 during Pontiac's Rebellion; however, the fort was never directly attacked.

=== American Revolutionary War ===
The fort was used as a prisoner of war camp from 1777 to 1783. As many as 1,000 captured British and German soldiers were incarcerated there after the Battles of Saratoga (1777) and Yorktown (1781).

=== American Civil War ===
Fort Frederick was sold at auction in 1791 and lay abandoned until the American Civil War. The fort was garrisoned at the outbreak of war and was used as a gun emplacement to protect the Chesapeake and Ohio Canal and the Baltimore and Ohio Railroad, which paralleled the canal. The 1st Maryland Infantry (US) occupied the area in December 1861 and Company H fought in a skirmish at the fort against Confederate raiders on Christmas Day, 1861. The regiment left in February 1862. In October 1862, a picket from the 12th Illinois Cavalry briefly occupied the area. The military usefulness of the fort ended by 1862.

=== 20th Century ===
In 1922, the property was acquired by the State of Maryland for use as a Maryland state park. The walls had deteriorated but were standing up to 8 feet (2.4 m) in places. Archaeological investigations and the discovery of the original plans allowed a complete reconstruction. Much of the restoration work of the 1930s was done by the Civilian Conservation Corps.

== Description ==
The fort is a large stone quadrangle with bastions at each corner. Each face of the curtain wall is about 179 feet (55 m) long, 17.5 feet (5.3 m) high and 3 feet (0.91 m) thick at the base. The bastions project diagonally about 100 feet (30 m), are 4.5 feet (1.4 m) thick at the base, and were filled with earth to provide a platform. The main gate is located in the center of the south curtain wall. Two of the three barracks buildings have been restored. The west barrack is reconstructed to its 1758 appearance, while the east barrack contains displays regarding the history of the fort. The north barrack, known as the Governor's House, has not been reconstructed.

== Activities and amenities ==
In addition to tours, displays, and exhibits at the fort, the park also offers a campground, fishing in Big Pool Lake, picnicking facilities, and a nature trail. The 23-mile (37 km) Western Maryland Rail Trail begins immediately to the west of the park.

== See also ==
- List of National Historic Landmarks in Maryland
- National Register of Historic Places listings in Washington County, Maryland
