= North Branch, Maryland =

Unincorporated community in Maryland, United States

- Unincorporated community
- Location within the State of Maryland North Branch, Maryland (the United States)
- Coordinates: 39°35′22″N 78°43′56″W
- Country: United States
- State: Maryland
- County: Allegany
- Elevation: 646 ft (197 m)
- Time zone: UTC-5 (Eastern (EST))
  - Summer (DST): UTC-4 (EDT)
- GNIS feature ID: 586211

North Branch is an unincorporated community in Allegany County, Maryland, United States. The Western Maryland Railroad Right-of-Way, Milepost 126 to Milepost 160 was listed on the National Register of Historic Places in 1981.
