= Big Pool, Maryland =

Unincorporated community in Maryland, United States

- census-designated place
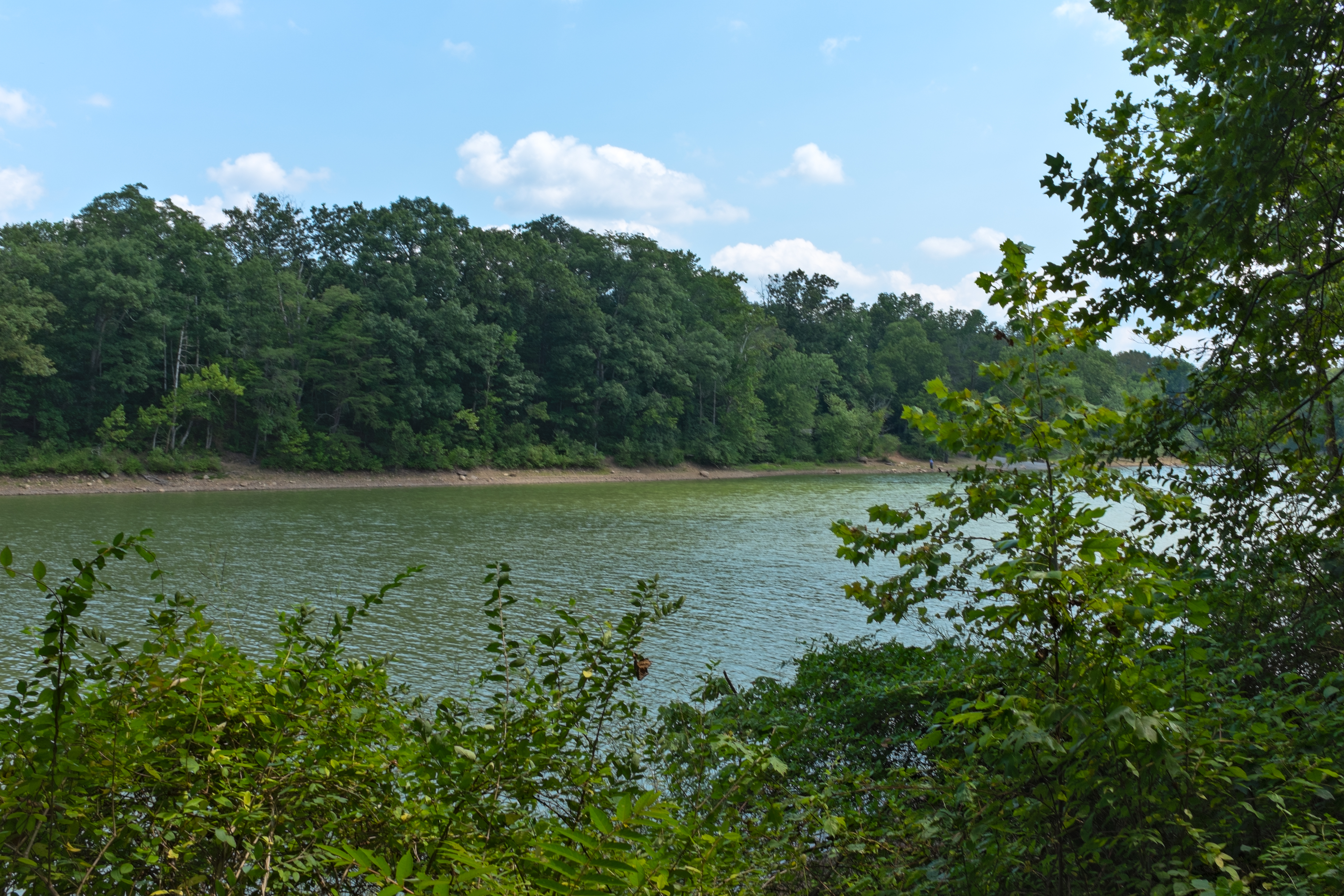
- Big Pool, the body of water formed when the Chesapeake and Ohio Canal was made, which gave the name to the area

- Location within Maryland Location within the United States
- Coordinates: 39°37′26″N 78°00′56″W
- Country: United States
- State: Maryland
- County: Washington

Area
  - Total: 0.11 sq mi (0.28 km^{2})
  - Land: 0.11 sq mi (0.28 km^{2})
  - Water: 0 sq mi (0.00 km^{2})
- Elevation: 443 ft (135 m)

Population (2020)
  - Total: 78
  - Density: 723.9/sq mi (279.51/km^{2})
- Time zone: UTC−5 (Eastern (EST))
  - Summer (DST): UTC−4 (EDT)
- Area codes: 301, 240
- FIPS code: 24-07375
- GNIS feature ID: 2583583

Big Pool is an unincorporated community and census-designated place in western Washington County, Maryland, United States. Its population was 82 as of the 2010 census. It is between Clear Spring, Maryland and Hancock, Maryland along Interstate 70 and is officially a part of the Hagerstown Metropolitan Area.

To the south of Big Pool lies Fort Frederick State Park, a restored fort used during the French and Indian War. Also nearby is the Chesapeake and Ohio Canal National Historical Park, which lies near Ft. Frederick alongside the Potomac River.

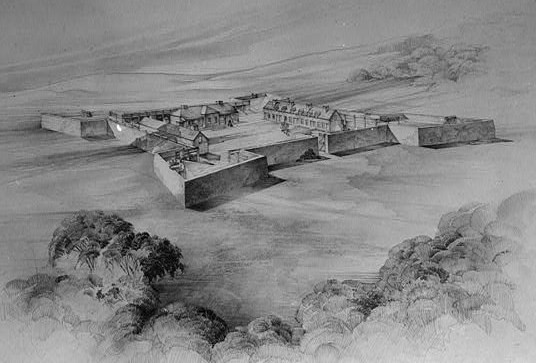
Fort Frederick State Park is located just south of Big Pool.

Big Pool is also the name of a large body of water which is part of the Chesapeake and Ohio Canal. This pool occurs roughly at the 113 mile mark, and it is on what the canallers called the 14 mile level.

Historical population
Census	Pop.	Note	%±
2020	78		—
U.S. Decennial Census
