= Paw Paw Old Mayor's Office and Jail =

Historic Building listed on the National Register of Historic Places

- U.S. National Register of Historic Places
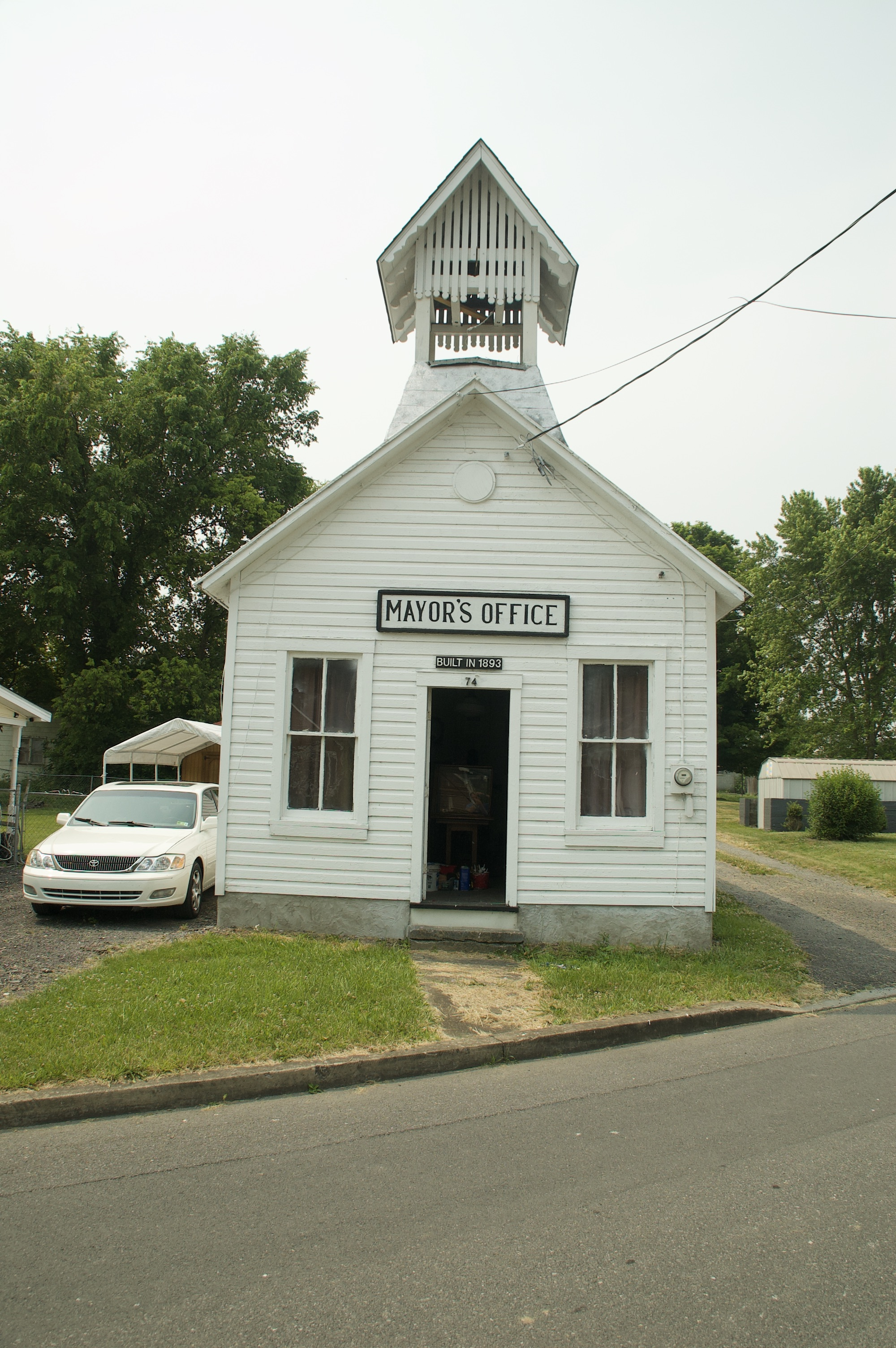
- Paw Paw Old Mayor's Office and Jail. June 2023

- Location within Eastern Panhandle of West Virginia Location within West Virginia Location within the United States
- Location: 93 Lee St., Paw Paw, West Virginia
- Coordinates: 39°32′02″N 78°27′32″W
- Area: 0.21 acres (0.085 ha)
- Built: 1893
- Architectural style: Folk Victorian
- NRHP reference No.: 100009542
- Added to NRHP: November 2, 2023

The Paw Paw Old Mayor's Office and Jail is an historic building in Paw Paw, Morgan County, West Virginia. It was built in 1893 in a simple Folk Victorian architectural style. It is a rectangular one story woodframe building constructed in two distinct sections. The front portion was used as the mayor's office and for town council meetings while the rear portion contained the town jail. The building served as the seat of government, and for social and civil functions until 1977.

The Paw Paw Old Mayor's Office and Jail was one of seventeen new historic sites in WV added to the National Register of Historic Places in 2023. Cody Straley, Structural Historian - National Register and Architectural Survey Coordinator, and contributing editor at WV Explorer wrote: "the landmark remains in excellent condition and is a charming example of small-town government in rural Appalachia."

It was individually listed on the National Register of Historic Places on November 2, 2023 and is the town's first entry on the National Register.
