= Woodmont, Washington County, Maryland =

Unincorporated community in Maryland, United States

Woodmont, Maryland
- Unincorporated community
- Location within Maryland
- Coordinates: 39°37′54″N 78°18′15″W
- Country: United States
- State: Maryland
- County: Washington
- Elevation: 486 ft (148 m)
- Time zone: UTC-5 (Eastern (EST))
  - Summer (DST): UTC-4 (EDT)
- Area codes: 301 & 240
- GNIS feature ID: 591601

Woodmont is an unincorporated community in Washington County, Maryland, United States. Western Maryland Railroad Right-of-Way, Milepost 126 to Milepost 160 was listed on the National Register of Historic Places in 1980.
