= Kessler Tunnel =

Abandoned railroad tunnel in Allegany County, Maryland, US

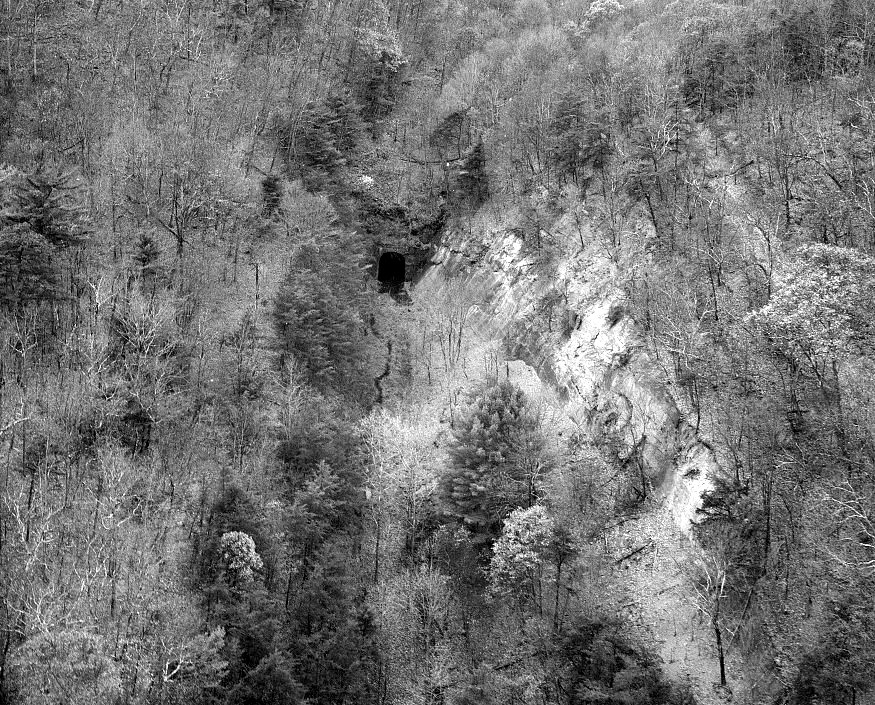
- East portal of the Kessler Tunnel.
- Interactive map of Kessler Tunnel

Overview
- Line: West Subdivision
- Location: Oldtown, Maryland
- Coordinates: 39.558°N 78.442°W
- Status: Abandoned
- System: Western Maryland Railway

Operation
- Opened: 1906
- Closed: 1975
- Owner: WM
- Traffic: Train
- Character: Freight and Passenger

Technical
- Length: 1,843.3 ft (561.8 m)
- No. of tracks: Single
- Track gauge: 1,435 mm (4 ft 8 1/2 in) standard gauge
- Max elevation: 349.3 ft (106.5 m)
- Grade: 0.5%

Kessler Tunnel is an abandoned railroad tunnel in Allegany County, Maryland, located about 8.5 miles (13.7 km) east-northeast of Oldtown. It was built by the Western Maryland Railway (WM) in 1906. It was constructed with concrete arch portals and the roof has wood planking. The tunnel was named for landowner John Kessler.

The tunnel was part of a major WM project to extend its rail system from Hagerstown west to Cumberland. The difficult route followed the Potomac River valley and involved construction of four additional tunnels and 23 bridges. The new rail line opened for traffic in 1906. Trains ran through the tunnel until 1975 and the rail line was abandoned that same year by the Chessie System, which had taken over the WM and combined the WM's operations with those of the Baltimore and Ohio Railroad.

The National Park Service acquired the tunnel and adjacent portions of the WM right of way in 1980. The site is part of Chesapeake and Ohio Canal National Historical Park.

== See also ==
- Indigo Tunnel
- Western Maryland Railroad Right-of-Way, Milepost 126 to Milepost 160
