= Paw Paw, West Virginia =

- Town
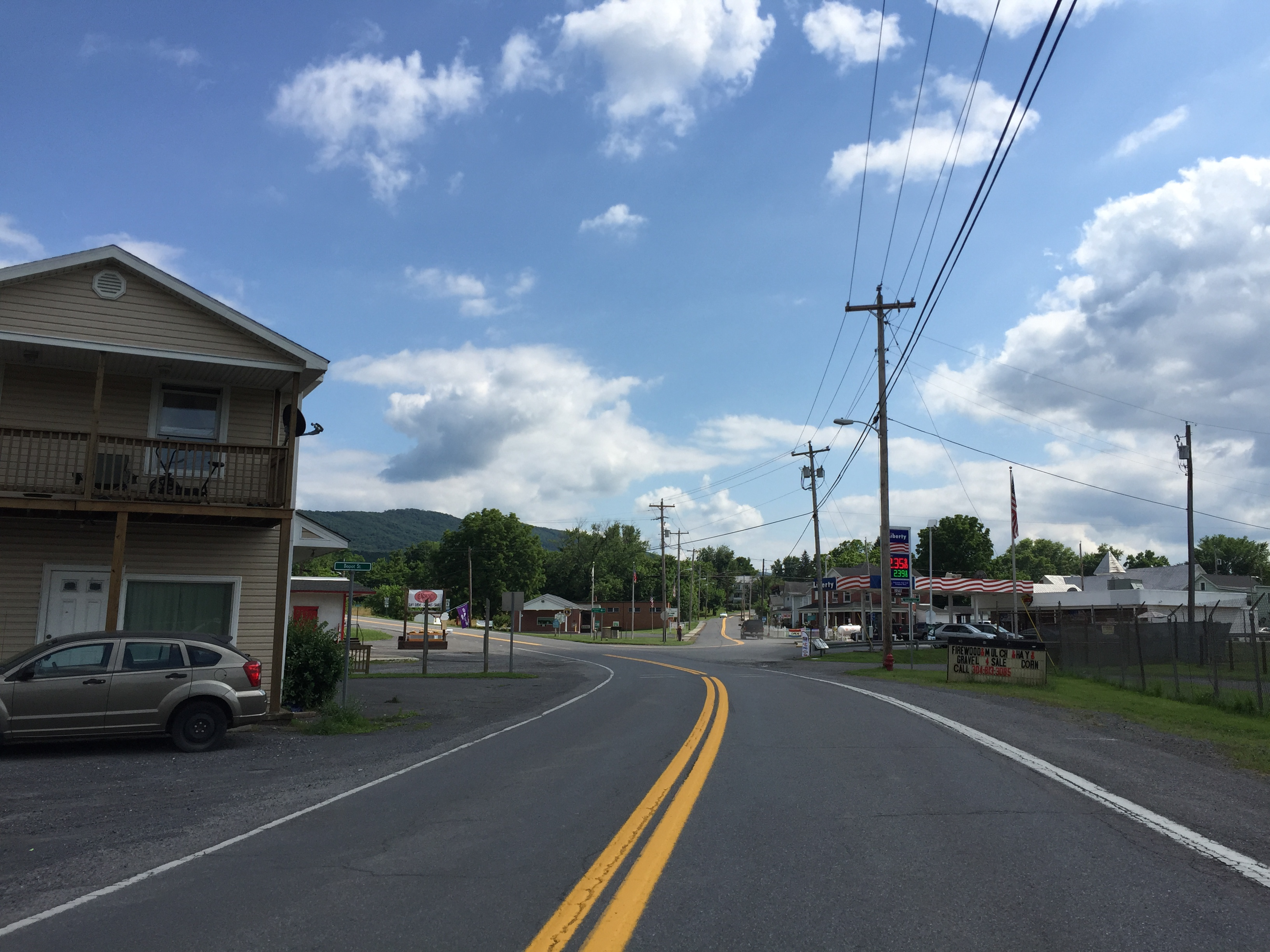
- WV 9 in Paw Paw

- Location of Paw Paw in Morgan County, West Virginia.
- Coordinates: 39°31′53″N 78°27′19″W
- Country: United States
- State: West Virginia
- County: Morgan

Area
  - Total: 0.53 sq mi (1.37 km^{2})
  - Land: 0.53 sq mi (1.37 km^{2})
  - Water: 0 sq mi (0.00 km^{2})
- Elevation: 561 ft (171 m)

Population (2020)
  - Total: 410
  - Density: 928.0/sq mi (358.32/km^{2})
- Time zone: UTC-5 (Eastern (EST))
  - Summer (DST): UTC-4 (EDT)
- ZIP code: 25434
- Area code: 304
- FIPS code: 54-62332
- GNIS feature ID: 2391352
- Website: www.townofpawpaw.com

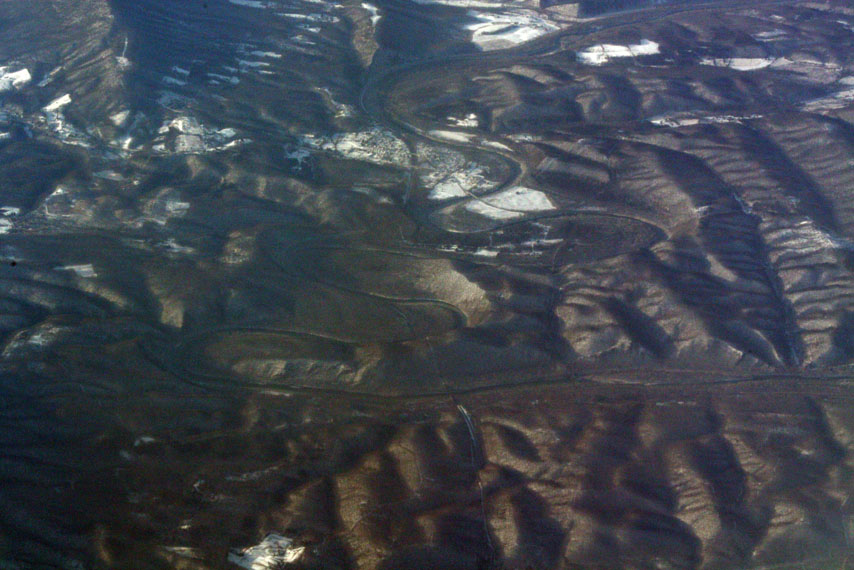
Meanders in the Potomac River with Paw Paw just above center.

Paw Paw is a town in Morgan County, West Virginia, United States. The population was 410 at the 2020 census. The town is known for the nearby Paw Paw Tunnel. Paw Paw was incorporated by the Circuit Court of Morgan County on April 8, 1891, and named after pawpaw, a wild fruit that grows in abundance throughout this region. On September 14, 2024, a group of local citizens organized by Maria Gloyd hosted the inaugural Pawpaw Festival in the Town Park. Hundreds of people attended the festival to hear lectures on how to grow and cultivate Pawpaw fruit, and listen to Appalachian music performed by the Paw Paw Community Choir, Ben Townsend, the Critton Hollow String Band, and Mary Hott with the Carpenter Ants. Paw Paw is the westernmost incorporated community in Morgan County, and the Hagerstown-Martinsburg, MD-WV Metropolitan Statistical Area.

Paw Paw is located along the section of the Potomac River known as the Paw Paw Bends. The Paw Paw Valley is surrounded by the ridges of Sideling Hill, Green Ridge, Purslane Mountain and Town Hill.

While the town's name is usually associated with the nearby Paw Paw Tunnel, which was part of the Chesapeake and Ohio Canal, it is more likely the town was named for the Paw Paw Tunnel constructed by the B&O railroad in the 1830s through the Paw Paw Ridge east of the town. The construction of the Paw Paw tunnel across the river in Maryland began in 1836 and was completed in 1850, 12 years behind schedule. Today, the tunnel and nearby canal are part of the Chesapeake and Ohio Canal National Historical Park.

== Geography ==
According to the United States Census Bureau, the town has a total area of 0.53 square miles (1.37 km^{2}), all of it land.

== History ==
The earliest human habitation in the upper Potomac River Valley probably dates from 10,000 BC when humans migrated across the Bering Straits into North America. In the 17th century, Europeans began arriving in increasing numbers. As European settlements gradually spread across western Virginia, the tribes were pushed from their villages and fields, which were then claimed and cultivated by the new settlers.

In 1681, England’s King Charles II made the first land grants in what is now the Eastern Panhandle of West Virginia. The territory, which includes Morgan County, was eventually inherited by Thomas, sixth Lord Fairfax and became known as the Fairfax Land Grant. In 1746, Thomas Jefferson’s father Peter was part of the survey party that reached the source of the Potomac River and set down the landmark known as the Fairfax Stone, now part of the Fairfax Stone Historical Monument State Park.

The following year, George Washington surveyed the region and later purchased land on the Paw Paw Bends, so named because of the way the Potomac River twists and turns for 31 miles between the towns of Paw Paw and Little Orleans. Washington described the land as being “In the shape of a horseshoe, the river running almost around it—two hundred acres of rich low grounds with a great abundance of walnut trees.”

By 1749, the Potomac River near present-day Paw Paw was being navigated by fur traders of the Ohio Company, while settlers were establishing farms on the surrounding land.

In 1836, the C&O Canal Company began work on a tunnel that was designed to eliminate seven miles of navigation on the river near Paw Paw. Two years later, construction of the Baltimore and Ohio Railroad began. Because of its proximity to both the railroad and the river, Paw Paw was considered a place of strategic importance during the American Civil War and was occupied by some 16,000 Union troops, most whom were quartered at Camp Chase (now Camp Hill), located east of Paw Paw, under the command of Brigadier General Frederick W. Lander.

In 1868, J.B. Hoyt and Company of New York established a leather factory in Paw Paw, which provided hundreds of jobs until its closure in 1951. Paw Paw also became well known for its local orchards and fruit packing houses. The Morgan News reported in 1894 "Paw Paw at the present time is more beautiful than in any former time of her history. The streets are superb, plank pavements elegant and her street lights refulgent." The streets were lit by oil lamps until 1926 when the Paw Paw Electric Company was awarded the franchise to bring electricity to the town. The first public school in Paw Paw started in the early 1870s in a building erected on the grounds of the tannery, but was washed away in the flood of 1877.

In 1893, two years after incorporation, the town constructed its Mayor's Office and Jail. The building was used as mayor's office, town council chambers and for civil and social functions until 1977. The building was added to the National Register of Historic Places in November 2023 and was the first entry for Paw Paw on the National Register. The former Saint Charles Catholic Mission Church constructed in 1876 and used by a small number of Catholic families until 1994 was added to the National Register of Historic Places in March 2024. A third building, the 1928 Paw Paw Black School, was added to the National Register of Historic Places in July 2024. The school was in use from 1928 until the end of "separate but equal education" in 1954. A fourth building, the 1909 WV State Senator P. E. Nixon House, home of prominent local businessman and politician P. E. Nixon, was added to the National Register in November 2024. In addition to these four buildings the WV State Historic Preservation Office has determined three additional buildings are also currently eligible based on their historic significance these are: the circa 1882 B&O Train Depot; the 1940 Consolidated Orchard Apple Packing Plant; and the 1942 Consolidated Distributors Headquarters - currently the Paw Paw Town Hall.

== Transportation ==
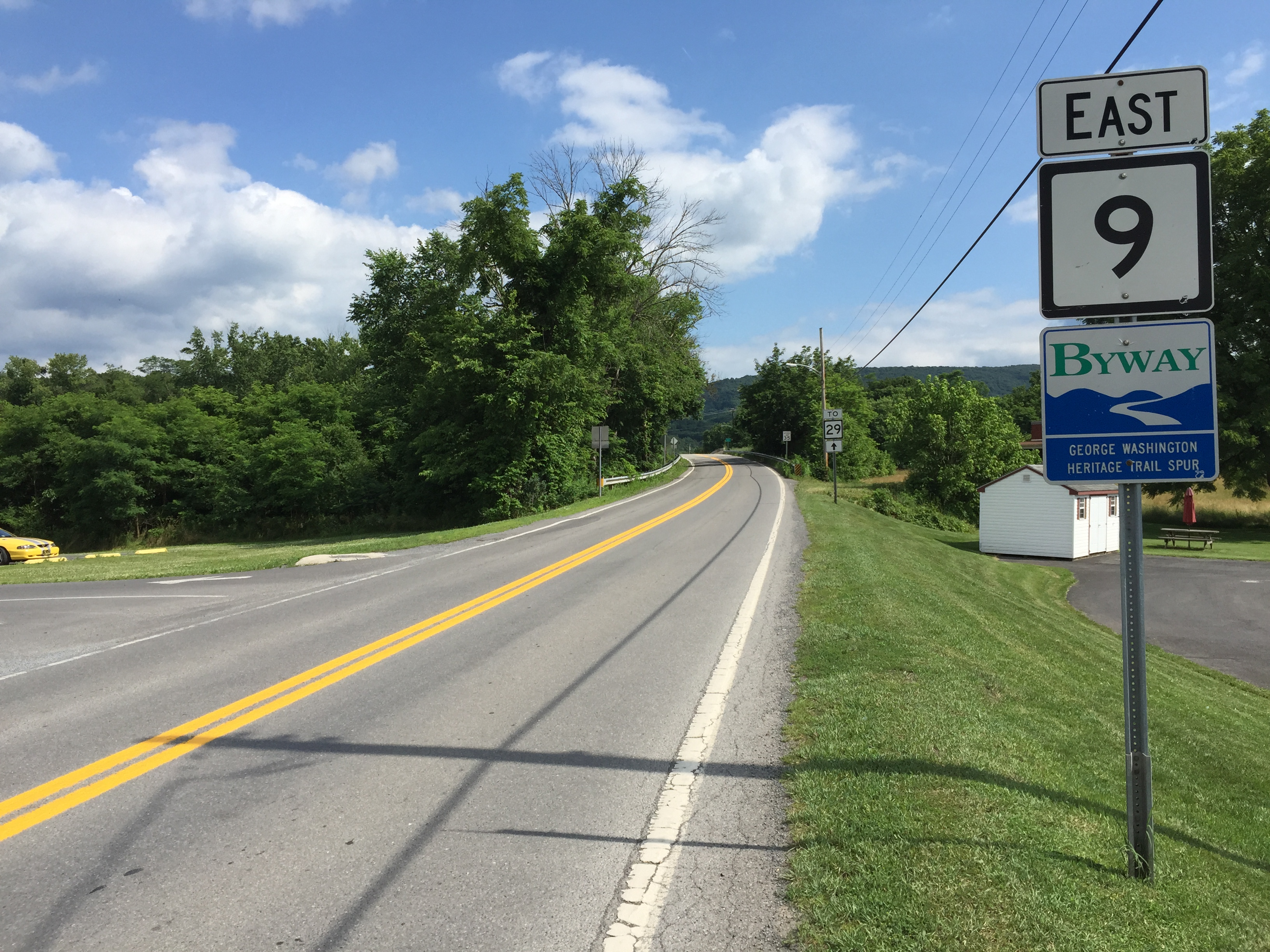
WV 9 heading east out of Paw Paw

The C&O Canal and the B&O Railroad both played important roles in the town's growth and prosperity. The Potomac River was dangerous and difficult to navigate, and the charter to build a canal to create a trade route with western settlements in Ohio and beyond was granted on May 17, 1785, to the Potowmack Company whose investors included George Washington. Three decades later, more than $729,000 had been spent on the project, but navigation on the river was still limited to only 45 days a year. The charter was taken over by the newly formed C&O Canal Company in 1828.

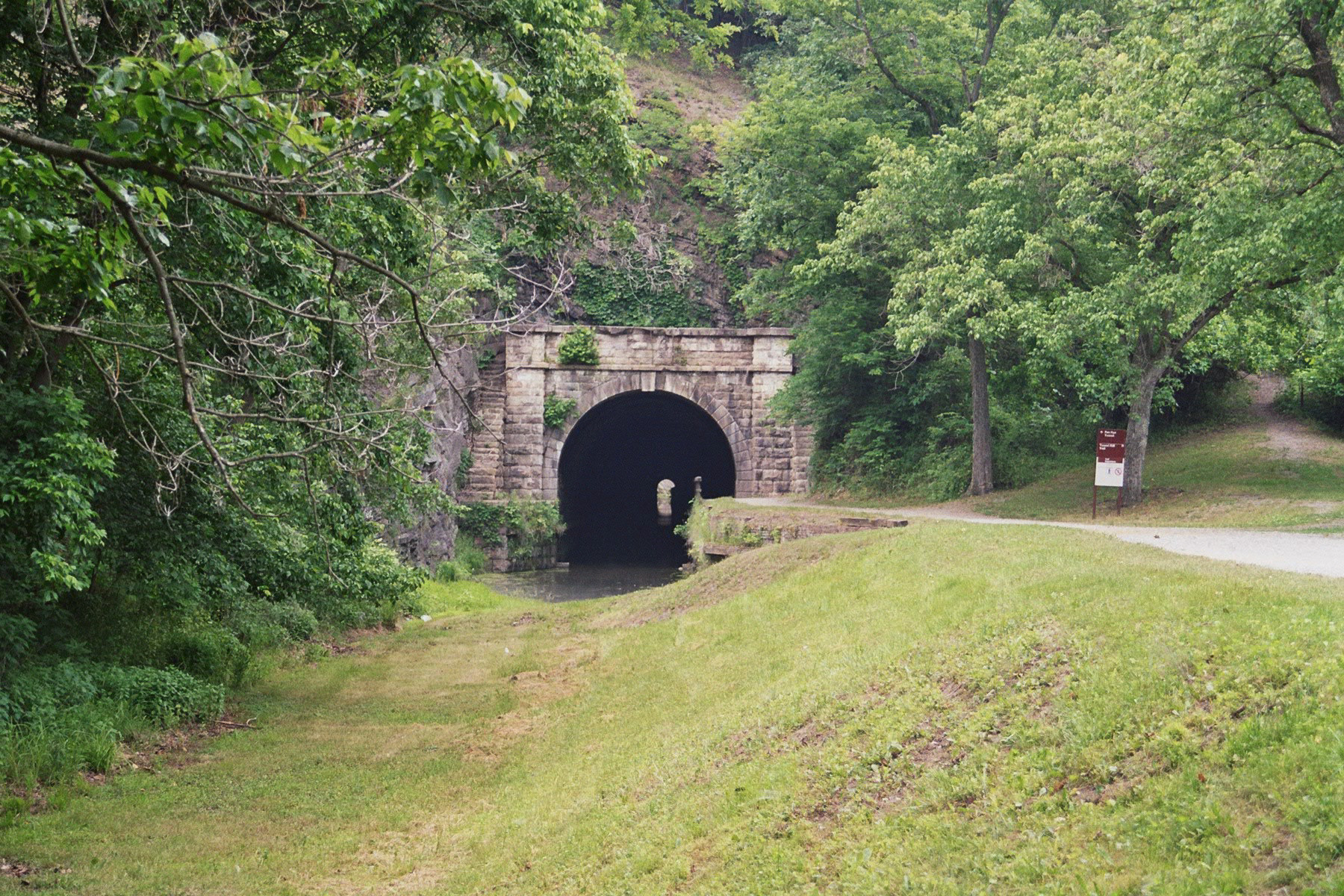
Paw Paw Tunnel South Portal

Construction on the Paw Paw Tunnel began in 1836 with a workforce composed largely of English, Welsh, German and Irish laborers. Plagued by accidents, disease, worker riots, and financial woes, the tunnel finally opened in 1850. Six million bricks were used in its construction which required cutting through 3,118 feet through stratified shale with hand tools and black powder charges. A strike in 1922, a flood in 1924, and the decline in demand for coal, which was a major source of freight revenue for the canal, after World War I led to its closure in 1925.

The B&O Railroad began construction after the C&O Canal but reached Cumberland, Maryland, in 1842, eight years ahead of the canal. Railroad construction started in Paw Paw in 1838, and over the next half century, the town became an important focal point for trade, bringing jobs and prosperity to the region. In 1905, the Western Maryland Railroad was constructed north of Paw, and in 1914, the B&O built a shortline through Paw Paw, with six local stops each day. The B&O removed the main line track from Paw Paw in 1961, bringing regular passenger service in Paw Paw to an end. The Paw Paw railroad depot, designed by noted B&O architect E. Francis Baldwin and constructed around 1882 replaced an earlier one opened in 1845, was permanently closed in 1961.

In 1928, the first bridge was built over the Potomac River from Paw Paw into Maryland, enabling the completion of a road directly into Cumberland. Previously, a ferry was used to cross the river.

Today, Paw Paw is served by Potomac Valley Transit's " Route 202" and West Virginia Route 9. WV 9 heads eastward to Berkeley Springs, the county seat, where it connects with U.S. Route 522. WV 9 also continues eastward from Berkeley Springs to Martinsburg. To the west, WV 9 crosses the Potomac River into Allegany County, Maryland, where it becomes Maryland Route 51. MD 51 continues westward to Cumberland, ending at a junction with Interstate 68, U.S. Route 40 and U.S. Route 220.

== Demographics ==
Historical population
Census	Pop.	Note	%±
1890	772		—
1900	693		−10.2%
1910	725		4.6%
1920	698		−3.7%
1930	781		11.9%
1940	990		26.8%
1950	820		−17.2%
1960	789		−3.8%
1970	706		−10.5%
1980	644		−8.8%
1990	538		−16.5%
2000	524		−2.6%
2010	508		−3.1%
2020	410		−19.3%
U.S. Decennial Census

=== 2010 census ===
As of the census of 2010, there were 508 people, 223 households, and 131 families living in the town. The population density was 958.5 inhabitants per square mile (370.1/km^{2}). There were 262 housing units at an average density of 494.3 per square mile (190.9/km^{2}). The racial makeup of the town was 92.9% White, 2.4% African American, 2.0% Native American, 0.4% Asian, 0.4% from other races, and 2.0% from two or more races. Hispanic or Latino of any race were 2.6% of the population.

There were 223 households, of which 30.0% had children under the age of 18 living with them, 41.3% were married couples living together, 12.6% had a female householder with no husband present, 4.9% had a male householder with no wife present, and 41.3% were non-families. 37.7% of all households were made up of individuals, and 19.7% had someone living alone who was 65 years of age or older. The average household size was 2.28 and the average family size was 2.96.

The median age in the town was 38.6 years. 23.6% of residents were under the age of 18; 7.5% were between the ages of 18 and 24; 27.6% were from 25 to 44; 25% were from 45 to 64; and 16.3% were 65 years of age or older. The gender makeup of the town was 49.0% male and 51.0% female.

=== 2000 census ===
As of the census of 2000, there were 524 people, 224 households, and 144 families living in the town. The population density was 999.4 inhabitants per square mile (385.9/km^{2}). There were 249 housing units at an average density of 474.9 per square mile (183.4/km^{2}). The racial makeup of the town was 89.50% White, 7.63% African American, 2.29% from other races, and 0.57% from two or more races. Hispanic or Latino of any race were 3.44% of the population.

There were 224 households, out of which 27.7% had children under the age of 18 living with them, 43.8% were married couples living together, 14.7% had a female householder with no husband present, and 35.3% were non-families. 28.6% of all households were made up of individuals, and 17.4% had someone living alone who was 65 years of age or older. The average household size was 2.32 and the average family size was 2.87.

In the town, the population was spread out, with 22.5% under the age of 18, 10.1% from 18 to 24, 25.2% from 25 to 44, 23.3% from 45 to 64, and 18.9% who were 65 years of age or older. The median age was 40 years. For every 100 females, there were 90.5 males. For every 100 females age 18 and over, there were 82.9 males.

The median income for a household in the town was $25,625, and the median income for a family was $30,250. Males had a median income of $27,500 versus $23,125 for females. The per capita income for the town was $17,377. About 14.9% of families and 18.1% of the population were below the poverty line, including 25.7% of those under age 18 and 14.0% of those age 65 or over.

== Notable people ==
Paul "Oz" Bach, founder and bass player for the popular musical group Spanky and Our Gang, was born in Paw Paw on June 24, 1939.

The Texas swing band Asleep at the Wheel got its start in Paw Paw, according to founder Ray Benson.

== Gallery of buildings eligible for the National Register of Historic Places ==
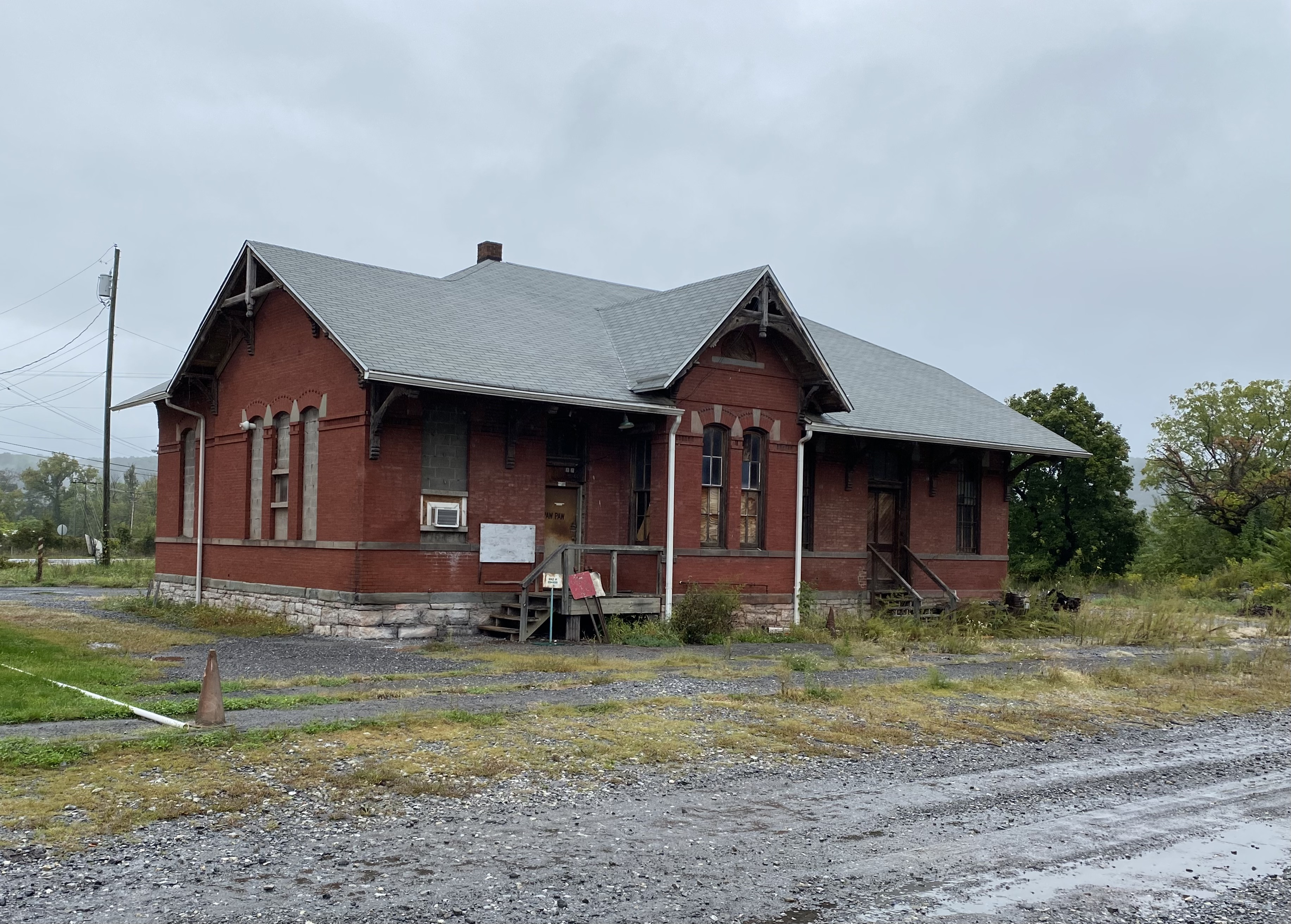
Circa 1882 B&O Train Depot

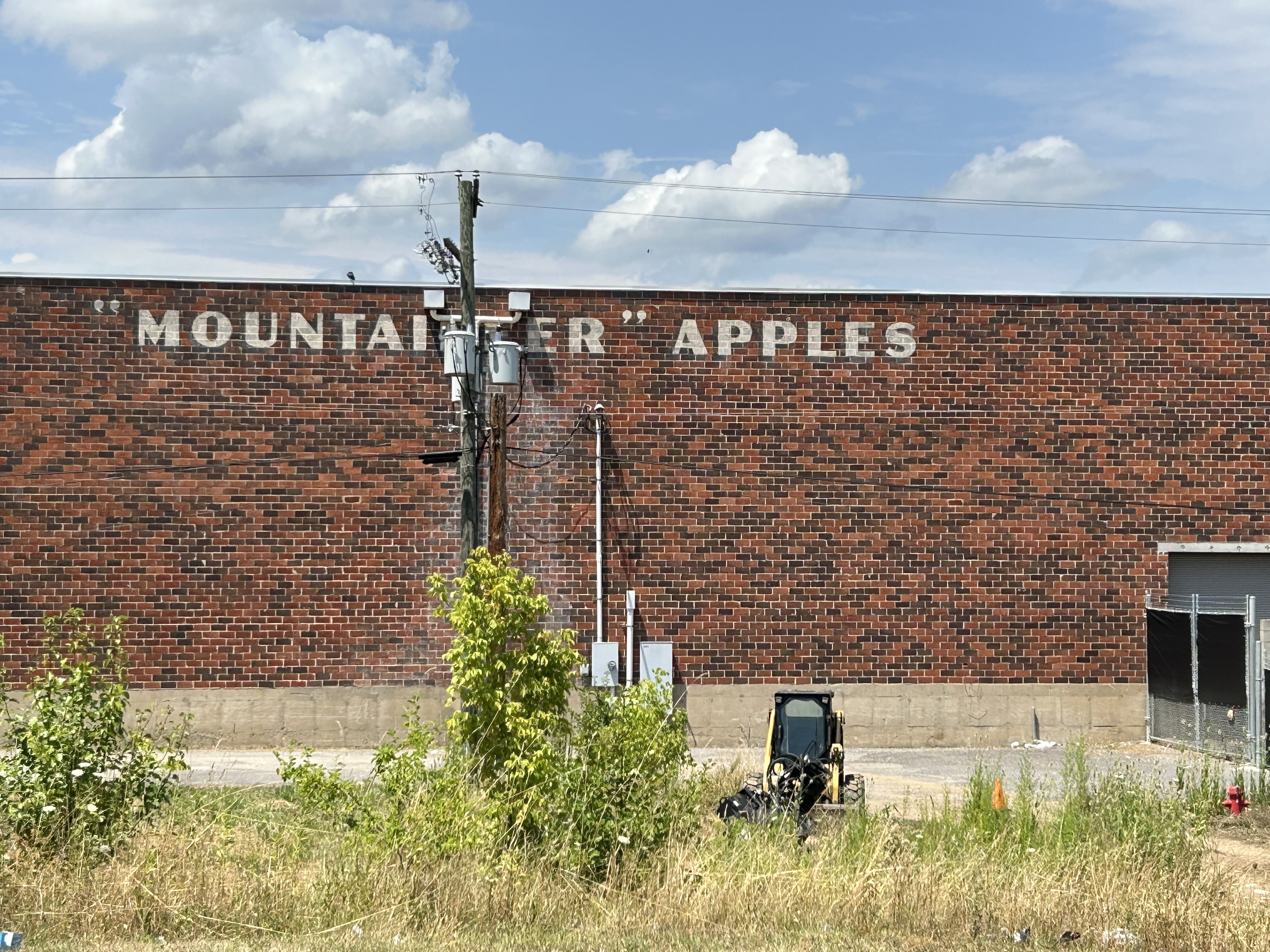
1940 Consolidated Orchard Apple Packing Plant

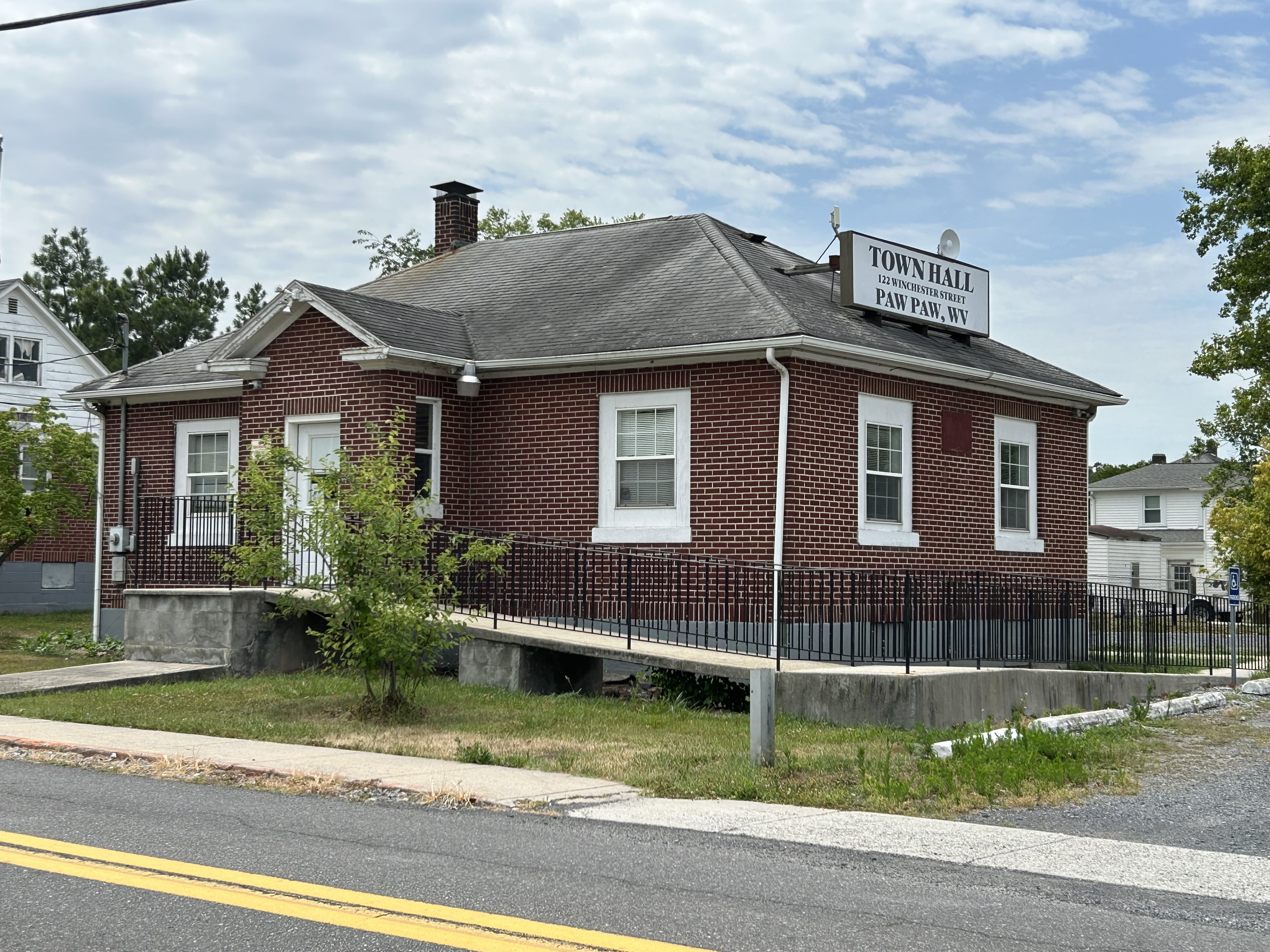
1942 Consolidated Distributors Headquarters
