= Little Orleans, Maryland =

- Census-designated place
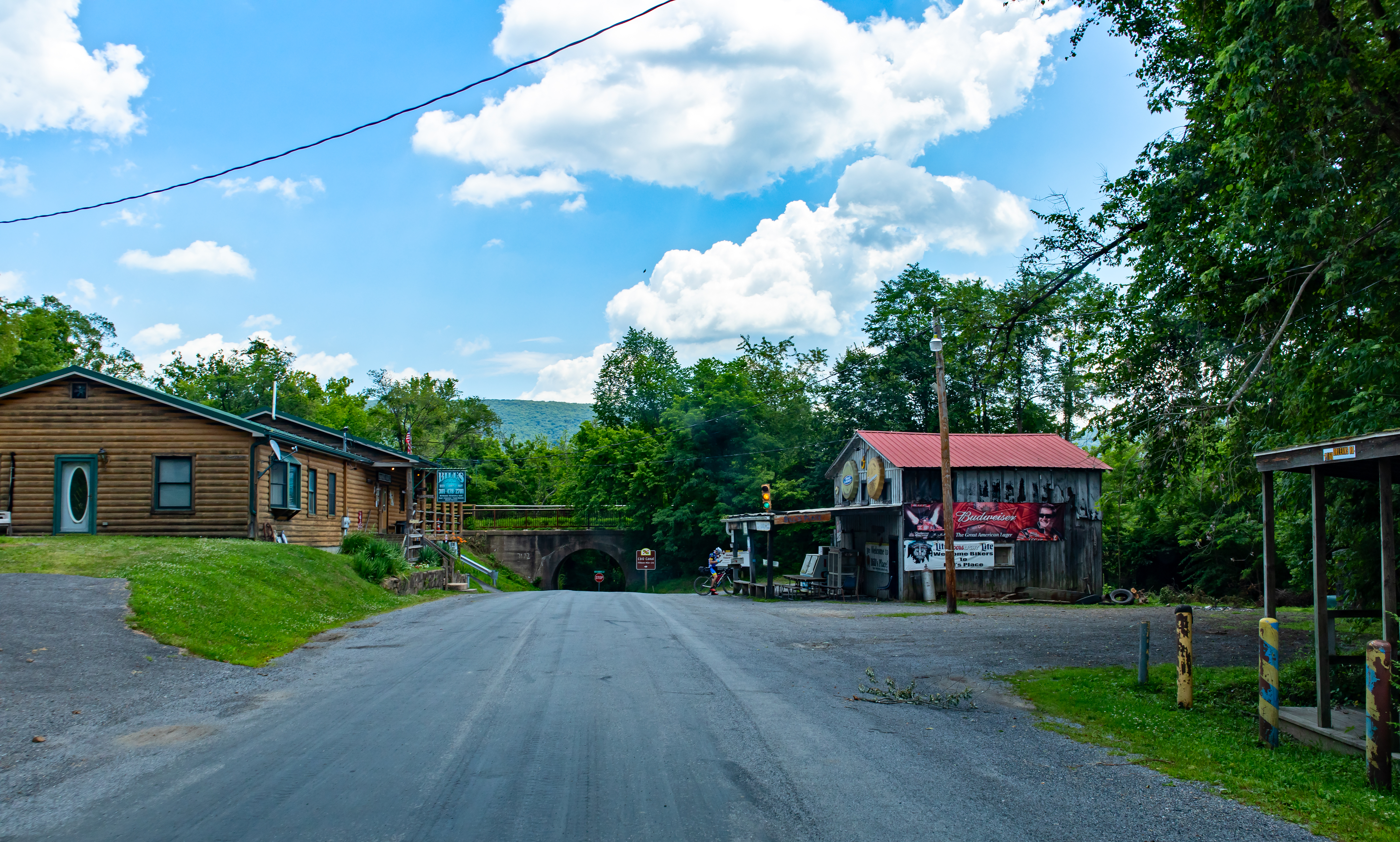
- Little Orleans

- Location within the State of Maryland Little Orleans, Maryland (the United States)
- Coordinates: 39°37′33″N 78°23′38″W
- Country: United States
- State: Maryland
- County: Allegany

Area
  - Total: 1.25 sq mi (3.23 km^{2})
  - Land: 1.24 sq mi (3.22 km^{2})
  - Water: 0.0039 sq mi (0.01 km^{2})
- Elevation: 581 ft (177 m)

Population (2020)
  - Total: 65
  - Density: 52/sq mi (20.2/km^{2})
- Time zone: UTC−5 (Eastern (EST))
  - Summer (DST): UTC−4 (EDT)
- ZIP code: 21766
- Area code: 301
- FIPS code: 24-47275
- GNIS feature ID: 2583650

Little Orleans is an unincorporated community and census-designated place (CDP) in Allegany County, Maryland, United States. As of the 2010 census it had a population of 42.

Little Orleans is located on the Potomac River at the mouth of Fifteenmile Creek across from Orleans Cross Roads, West Virginia. Little Orleans was served by the Chesapeake & Ohio Canal, and by the Western Maryland Railway, both of which have been abandoned. "Bill's Place", a restaurant and store, is located adjacent to the canal. An annual event hosted by Ken Appel, "Apple's East Coast Motorcycle Rally" (formerly East Coast Sturgis) attracts thousands of visitors every August to this otherwise sleepy little town.

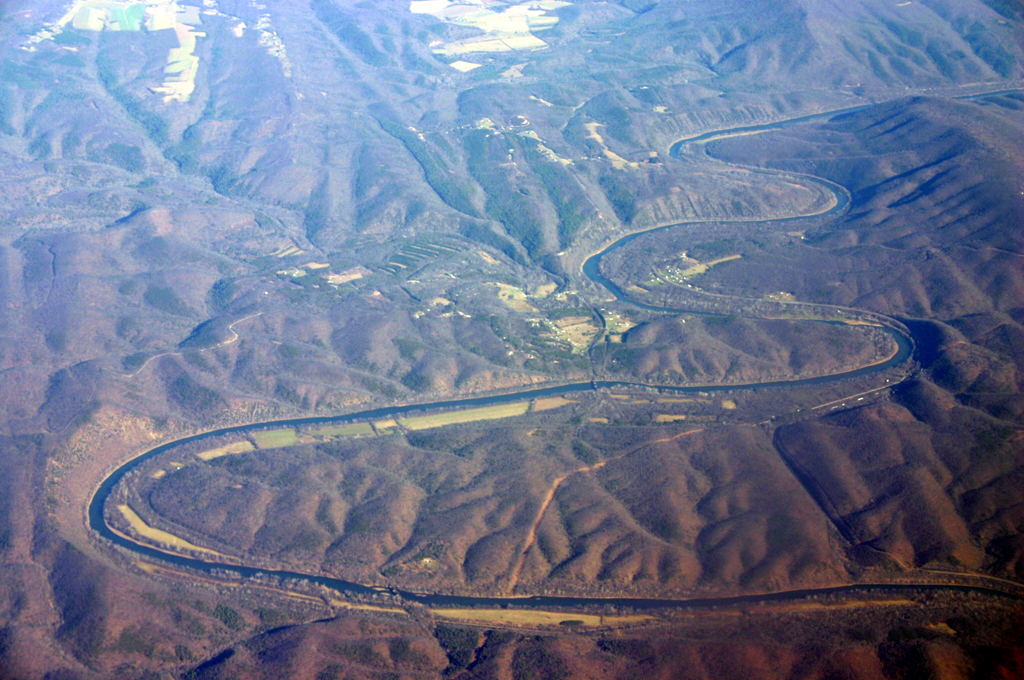
Oblique air photo of the meandering Potomac River at Little Orleans (center), facing north. The photo shows Allegany County, Maryland (left), Morgan County, West Virginia (right), Sideling Hill (right), and the Chesapeake and Ohio Canal.

== Demographics ==
Historical population
Census	Pop.	Note	%±
2020	65		—
U.S. Decennial Census
