= National Register of Historic Places listings in Morgan County, West Virginia =

Location of Morgan County in West Virginia

This is a list of the National Register of Historic Places listings in Morgan County, West Virginia.

This is intended to be a complete list of the properties and districts on the National Register of Historic Places in Morgan County, West Virginia, United States. The locations of National Register properties and districts for which the latitude and longitude coordinates are included below, may be seen in an online map.

There are 20 properties and districts listed on the National Register in the county.

This National Park Service list is complete through NPS recent listings posted September 26, 2025.

Contents: Counties in West Virginia

Barbour - Berkeley - Boone - Braxton - Brooke - Cabell - Calhoun - Clay - Doddridge - Fayette - Gilmer - Grant - Greenbrier - Hampshire - Hancock - Hardy - Harrison - Jackson - Jefferson - Kanawha - Lewis - Lincoln - Logan - Marion - Marshall - Mason - McDowell - Mercer - Mineral - Mingo - Monongalia - Monroe - Morgan - Nicholas - Ohio - Pendleton - Pleasants - Pocahontas - Preston - Putnam - Raleigh - Randolph - Ritchie - Roane - Summers - Taylor - Tucker - Tyler - Upshur - Wayne - Webster - Wetzel - Wirt - Wood - Wyoming

== Current listings ==
	Name on the Register	Image	Date listed	Location	City or town	Description
1	Ambrose Chapel		December 15, 1998 (#98001470)	Winchester Grade Rd. 39°31′42″N 78°13′53″W	Stotlers Crossroads	
2	Berkeley Springs State Park	Berkeley Springs State Park	May 24, 1976 (#76001943)	S. Washington and Fairfax Sts. 39°37′35″N 78°13′44″W	Berkeley Springs	
3	Berkeley Springs Train Depot	Berkeley Springs Train Depot	March 23, 2001 (#00001313)	342 N. Washington St. 39°37′52″N 78°13′28″W	Berkeley Springs	
4	Chesapeake and Ohio Canal National Historical Park	Chesapeake and Ohio Canal National Historical Park	October 15, 1966 (#66000036)	Bordering the Potomac River from Georgetown, D.C. to Cumberland, Maryland; 38°53′59″N 77°03′28″W	Harpers Ferry, Paw Paw, and Shepardstown	
5	T. H. B. Dawson House	T. H. B. Dawson House	February 10, 1983 (#83003247)	139 S. Green St. 39°37′27″N 78°13′39″W	Berkeley Springs	
6	Clarence Hovermale House	Clarence Hovermale House	May 2, 2003 (#03000350)	167 Wilkes St. 39°37′42″N 78°13′41″W	Berkeley Springs	
7	Great Cacapon Bridge	Great Cacapon Bridge	September 8, 2025 (#100012205)	WV Route 9 over the Cacapon River; 39°37′06″N 78°16′59″W	Great Cacapon	
8	Largent Bridge	Largent Bridge	September 8, 2025 (#100012204)	WV Route 9 over the Cacapon River; 39°28′52″N 78°23′04″W	Largent	
9	Morgan County Courthouse	Morgan County Courthouse	September 7, 2005 (#05001004)	202 Fairfax St. 39°37′44″N 78°13′39″W	Berkeley Springs	After a fire the courthouse was demolished in 2006
10	New Deal Resources in Cacapon State Park Historic District	New Deal Resources in Cacapon State Park Historic District	August 12, 2019 (#100002853)	818 Cacapon Lodge Drive; 39°30′21″N 78°18′07″W	Berkeley Springs	
11	Senator P. E. Nixon House	Senator P. E. Nixon House	November 15, 2024 (#100011008)	40 Winchester Street; 39°32′03″N 78°27′27″W	Paw Paw	
12	Paw Paw Old Mayor's Office and Jail	Paw Paw Old Mayor's Office and Jail	November 2, 2023 (#100009542)	93 Lee Street; 39°32′02″N 78°27′32″W	Paw Paw	
13	Paw Paw Black School	Paw Paw Black School	July 17, 2024 (#100010588)	149 North Amelia Street; 39°31′53″N 78°27′35″W	Paw Paw	
14	John Herbert Quick House	John Herbert Quick House	August 23, 1984 (#84003639)	73 Manor House Ln. 39°34′56″N 78°16′03″W	Berkeley Springs	
15	Saint Charles Catholic Mission Church	Saint Charles Catholic Mission Church	March 28, 2024 (#100010184)	153 Winchester Street; 39°31′57″N 78°27′28″W	Paw Paw	
16	Sloat-Horn-Rossell House	Sloat-Horn-Rossell House	August 23, 1984 (#84003643)	234 Fairfax St. 39°37′37″N 78°13′34″W	Berkeley Springs	
17	Samuel Taylor Suit Cottage	Samuel Taylor Suit Cottage	November 28, 1980 (#80004035)	276 Cacapon Rd. 39°37′38″N 78°13′49″W	Berkeley Springs	
18	Town of Bath Historic District	Town of Bath Historic District	April 23, 2009 (#09000245)	Roughly Washington and Fairfax Sts. and adjacent blocks 39°37′36″N 78°13′40″W	Berkeley Springs	
19	Western Maryland Railroad Right-of-Way, Milepost 126 to Milepost 160	Western Maryland Railroad Right-of-Way, Milepost 126 to Milepost 160	July 23, 1981 (#81000078)	Milepost 126 to Milepost 160; 39°33′53″N 78°32′08″W	Jerome	
20	Judge John W. Wright Cottage	Judge John W. Wright Cottage	April 28, 1986 (#86000896)	156 S. Green St. 39°37′28″N 78°13′40″W	Berkeley Springs	

== See also ==
- List of National Historic Landmarks in West Virginia
- National Register of Historic Places listings in West Virginia
