= Quick House =

Quick House may refer to:

- William LaFayette Quick House, New Market, Alabama, listed on the Alabama Register of Landmarks and Heritage
- James A. and Lottie J. (Congdon) Quick House, Gaylord, Michigan
- Martin A. Quick House, Bath, New York, listed on the National Register of Historic Places
- John Herbert Quick House, Morgan County, West Virginia
