= Coolfont Resort =

Hotel in West Virginia, United States

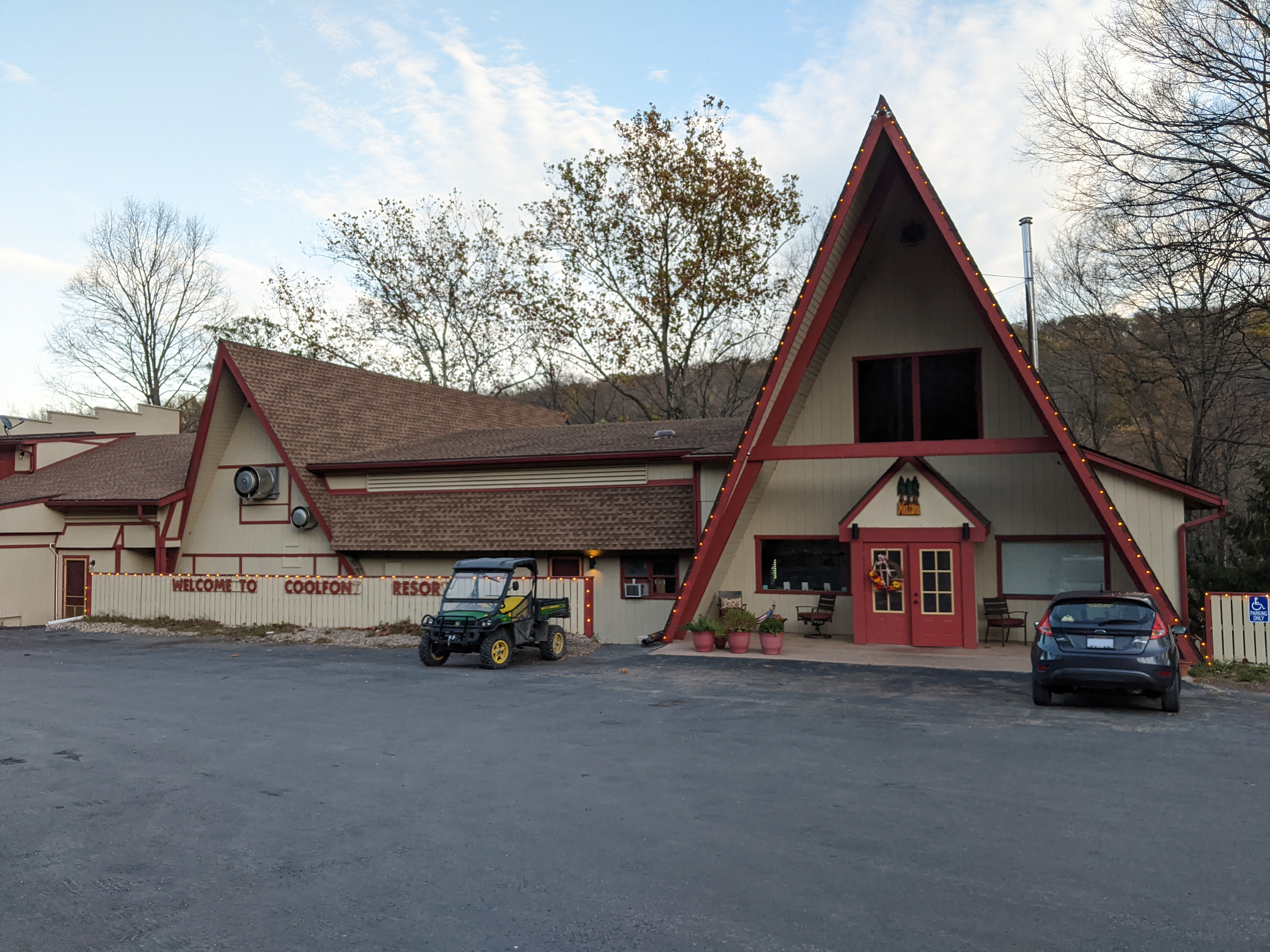
- Coolfont Resort main building in November 2020
- Interactive map of the Coolfont Resort area

General information
- Architectural style: A-frame
- Location: 3621 Cold Run Valley Road, Berkeley Springs, West Virginia
- Coordinates: 39.578315°N 78.268131°W
- Opened: 1965; 61 years ago
- Owner: Larry Omps

Website
- www.coolfont.com

Coolfont Resort is a resort hotel in Berkeley Springs, West Virginia, operating from 1965 to 2006 and from 2020 to present.

== History ==
In 1961, Sam Ashelman (1913–2010), a Washington, D.C. businessman who had been influential in the consumer cooperative movement, bought the property, consisting of about 1,200 acres including a landmark 1913 house built by author John Herbert Quick and called Coolfont in reference to nearby springs. In 1965, Ashelman, together with his wife Martha and Rosalyn and Alden Capen, established the hotel. The Ashelmans added numerous cabins, private homes, a conference center, and other buildings on the grounds. It became a West Virginia landmark visited by numerous famous guests, and noted as a retreat for Washington politicians who used the facility for both recreation and for policy discussions. Among the hotel's best known regular guests were Al and Tipper Gore, who famously got lost in the woods while hiking at Coolfont a few days after Al Gore was elected Vice President of the United States in the 1992 election.

By 2003, Ashelman's son Randall was in charge of operations, while Sam Ashelman remained active and continued the activities of the non-profit Coolfont Foundation for the Arts, which brought musicians, writers, and others to the resort. In 2005 the Coolfont was sold for a reported $7.8 million to the Carl M. Freeman Companies, a real estate developer with aspirations to upgrade the resort and create a community of homes. However, company CEO Joshua Freeman was killed in a helicopter crash the following year, and the resort lay dormant and in disrepair.

In 2014 the company removed a substantial amount of timber from the property. The property was listed for sale and in 2016 was put up for auction. The entire remaining resort property, amounting to 988 acres, was sold in nine parcels for a total of $2.673 million.

In 2019 the resort began reconstruction and was set to reopen by May 2020. The restaurant and some lodging reopened during early- and mid-2020. A brewpub opened on the resort campus in 2019.

On January 26, 2025, a multi-alarm fire broke out in the main building of Coolfont Resort, leading to the "complete loss" of the main hotel building.

== Gallery ==
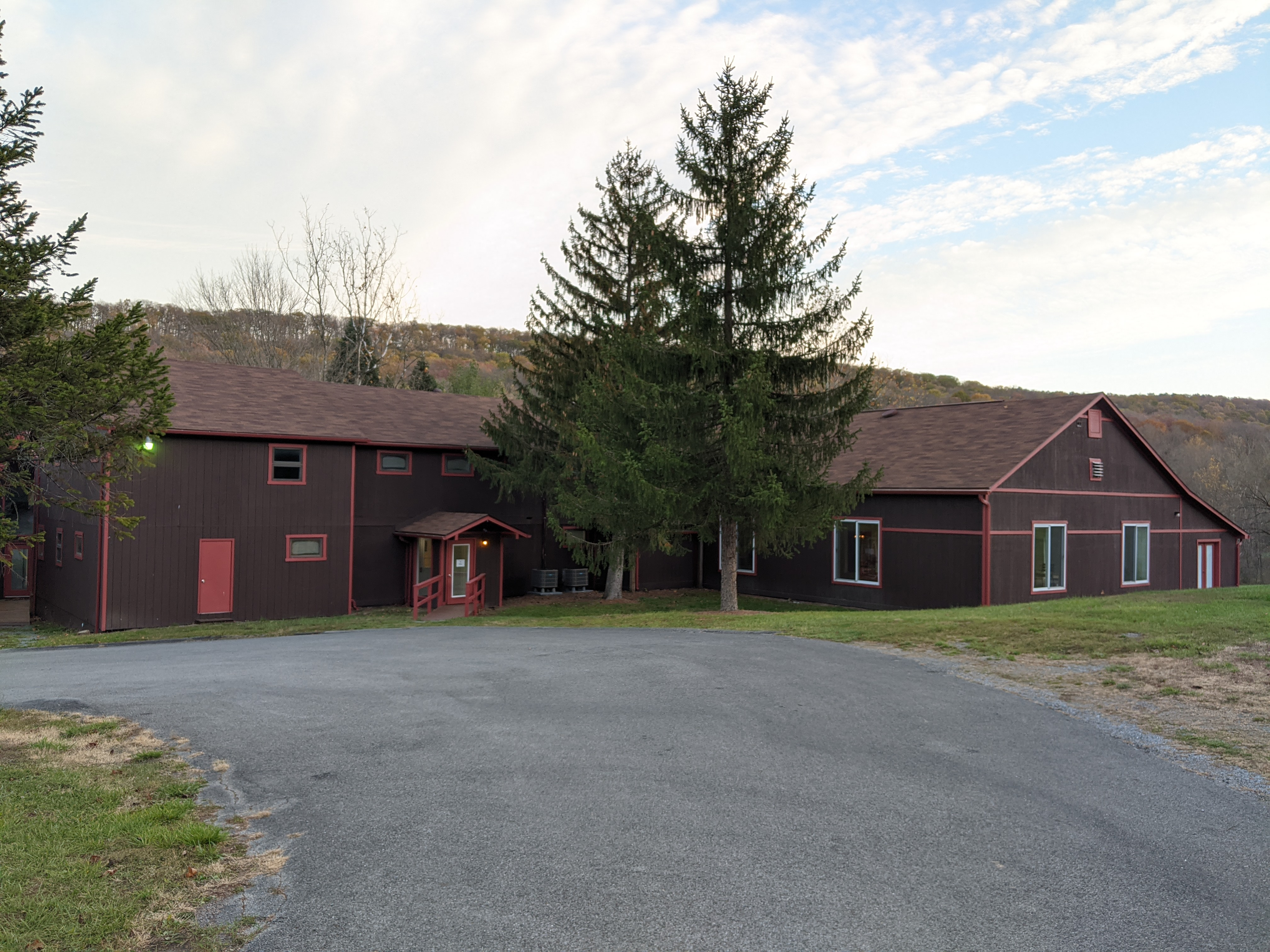
Recreational building at Coolfont Resort in November 2020

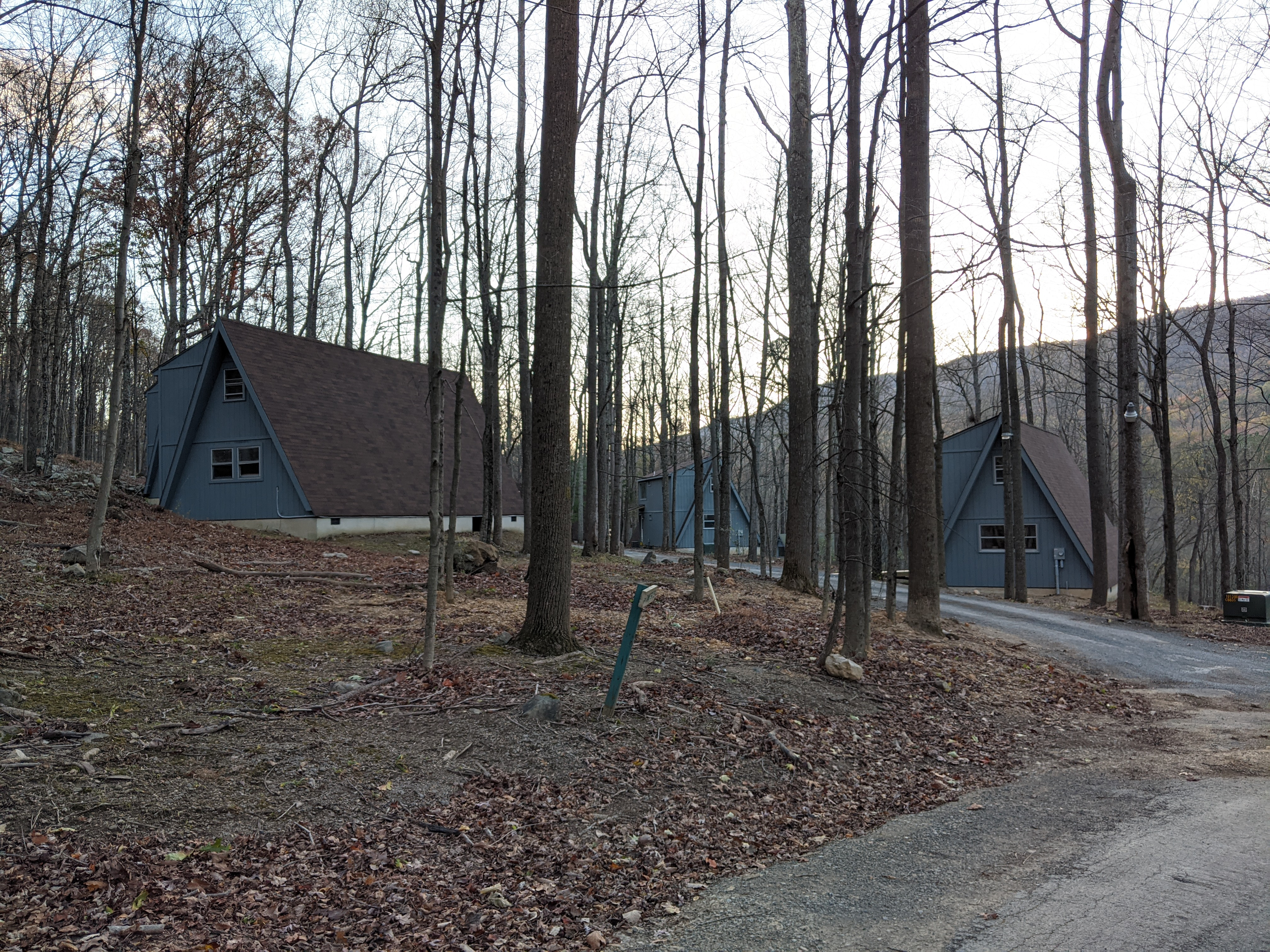
Alpine Village Lodges at Coolfont Resort in November 2020

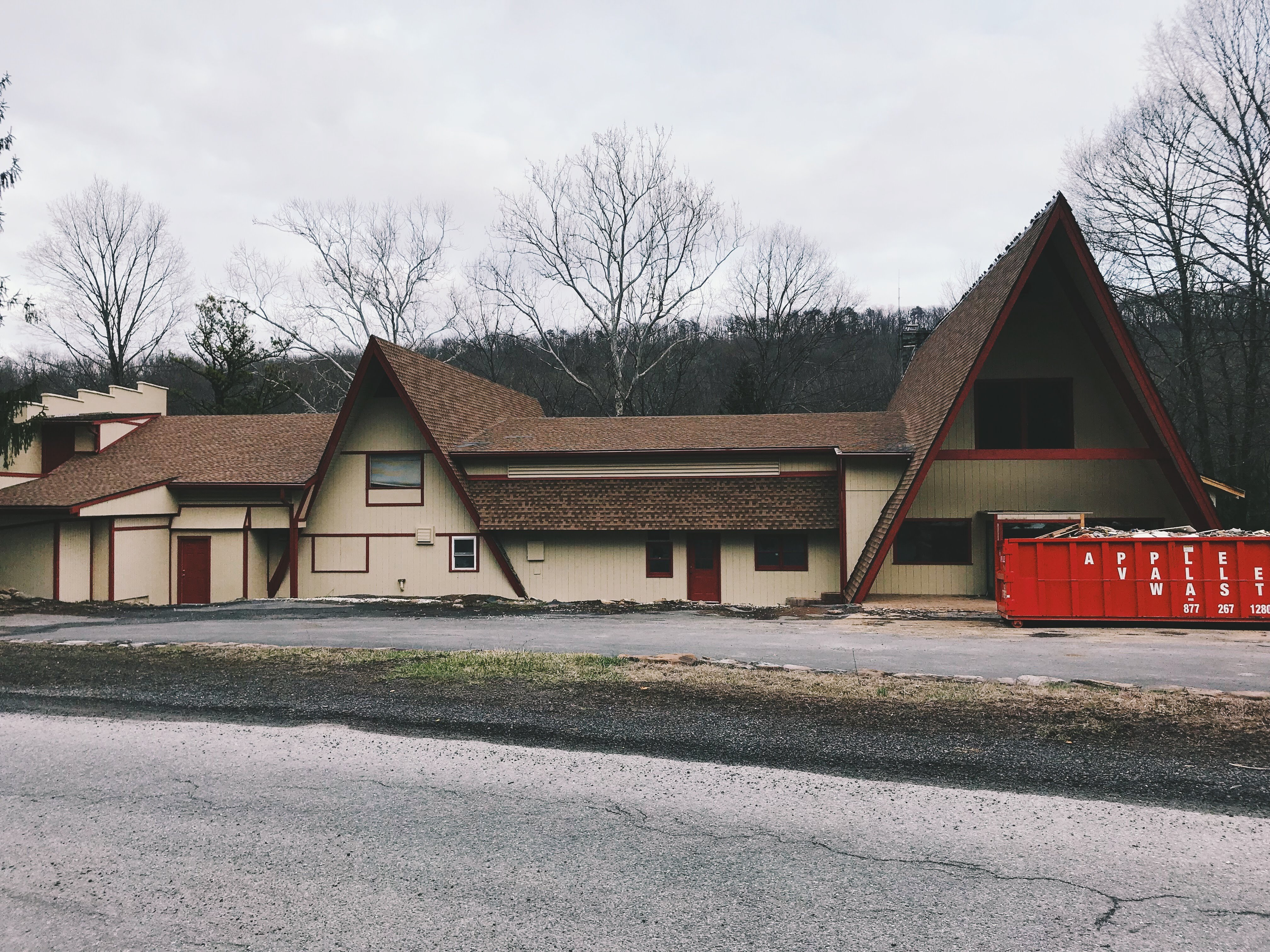
The updated resort building pre-opening

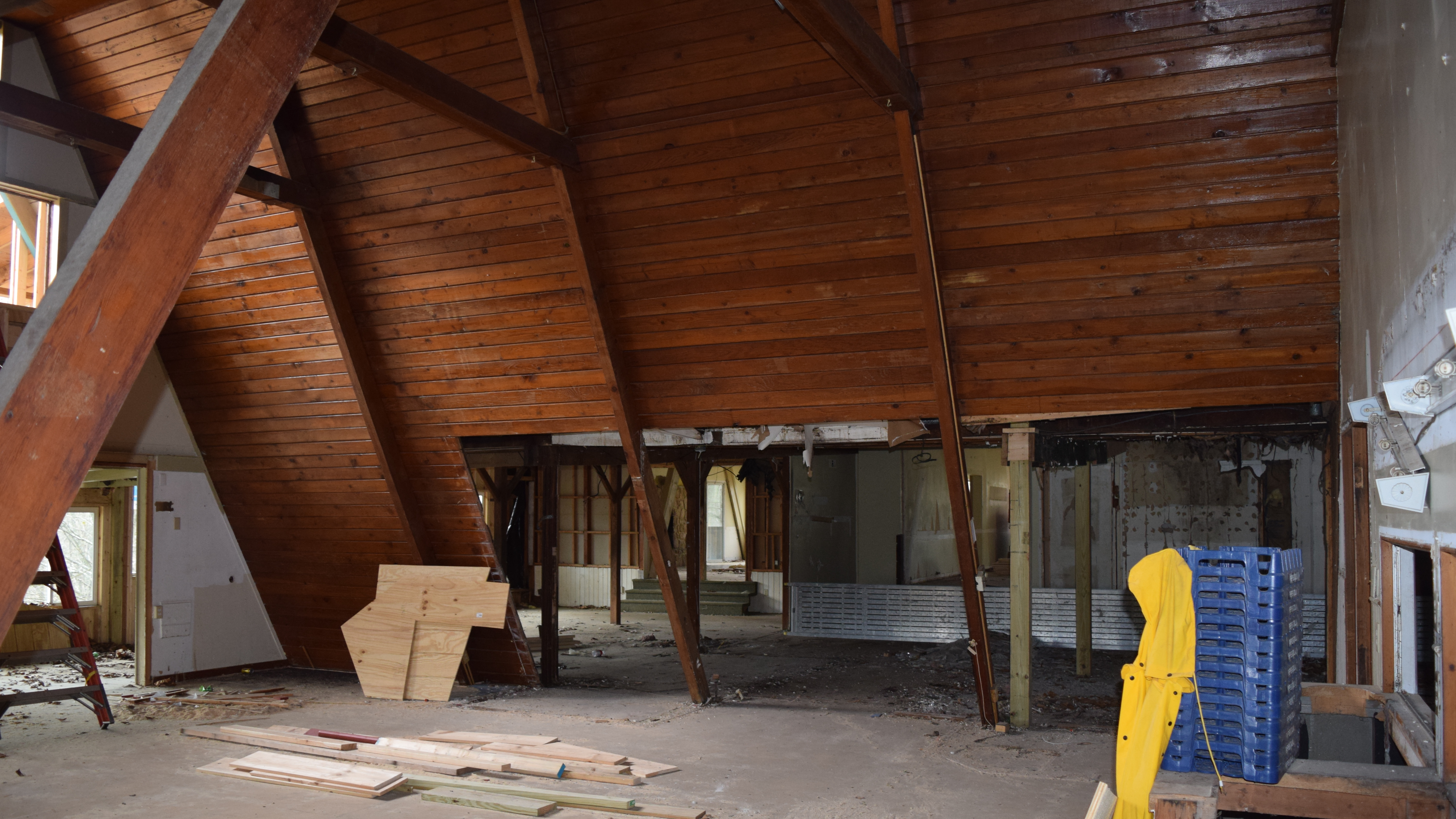
Lobby during reconstruction
