= Bath, Virginia =

Bath, Virginia may refer to:

- Bath (Berkeley Springs), West Virginia, before 1863
- Bath County, Virginia
