= Double Trouble (1915 film) =

1915 film by Christy Cabanne

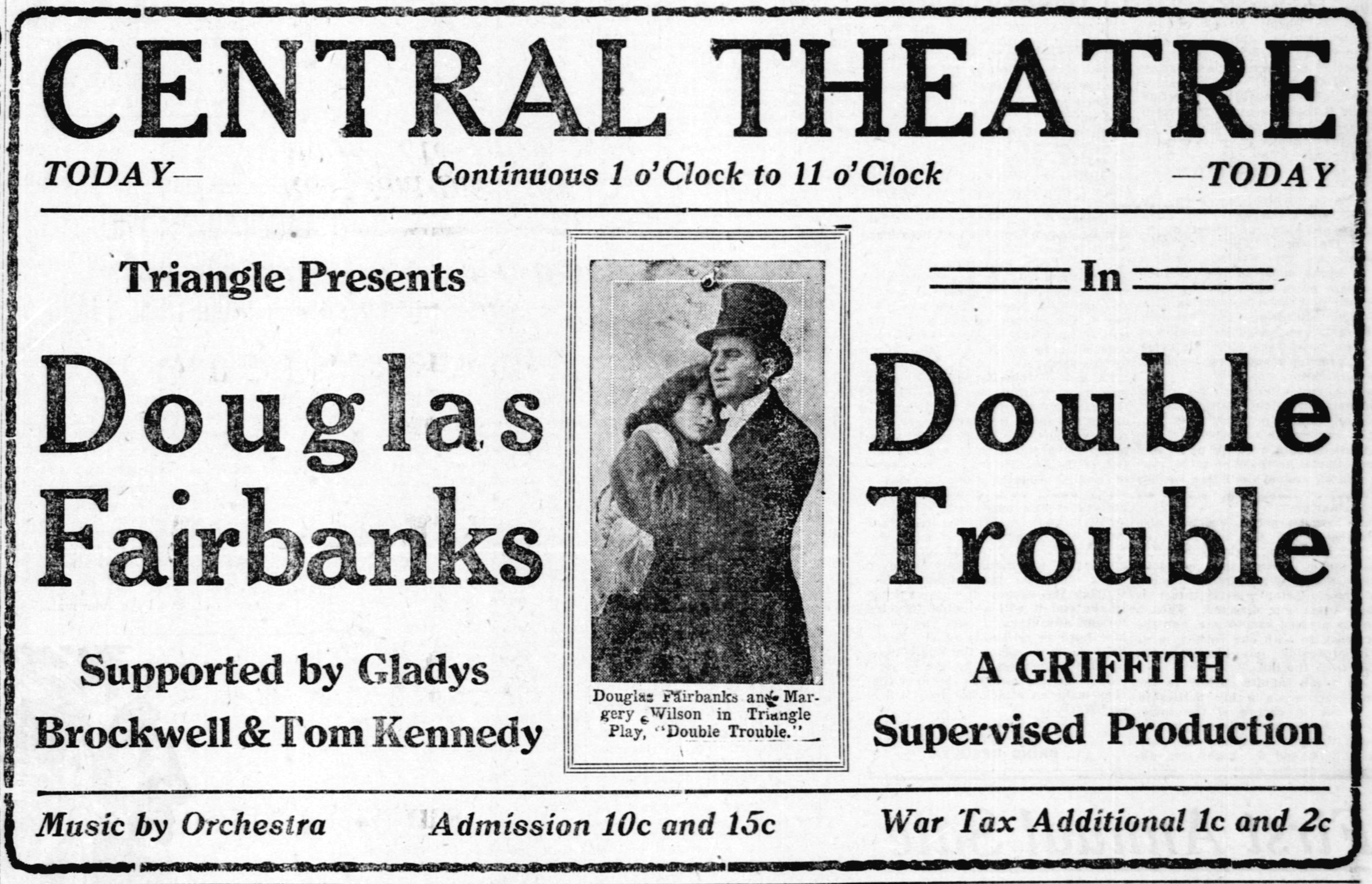
- Newspaper advertisement
- Directed by: Christy Cabanne
- Written by: Christy Cabanne
- Based on: Double Trouble; 1906 novel by Herbert Quick
- Produced by: D. W. Griffith
- Starring: Douglas Fairbanks
- Cinematography: William Fildew
- Music by: Joseph Carl Breil
- Production company: Fine Arts Film Company
- Distributed by: Triangle Distributing
- Release date: December 5, 1915
- Running time: 50 minutes
- Country: United States
- Languages: Silent; English intertitles

Double Trouble is a 1915 American silent romantic comedy film written and directed by Christy Cabanne, produced by D.W. Griffith, and starring Douglas Fairbanks in one of his earliest motion pictures. The film is based on the novel of the same name by Herbert Quick. The plot, a variant on the theme of Jekyll and Hyde, revolves around a very shy, "effeminate" banker who acquires a second, rakish and flirtatious personality after receiving a blow on the head. The film was a popular and critical success.

A print of the film is held by the Cohen Media Group.

== Plot summary ==
The plot revolves around Florian Amidon, a shy and timid banker who goes on vacation only to be assaulted, robbed, and knocked unconscious. When he finally wakes up, he finds himself in the bustling oil town of Bakerstown with no memory of how he got there and a five-year gap in his life.

Confused and disoriented, Florian enlists the help of his friend, Judge Blodgett, and together they seek the assistance of Madame Leclaire, a clairvoyant. Madame Leclaire puts Florian in a trance, and to everyone's surprise, he awakens as a man named Mr. Brassfield. Mr. Brassfield recounts his experience of waking up in Bakerstown after the head injury, completely unaware of his past and even his own name. Embracing his new identity, Mr. Brassfield strikes oil and amasses great wealth, ultimately being nominated for the position of mayor.

However, as Mr. Brassfield becomes involved in romantic affairs and unscrupulous business dealings, the old judge and Madame Leclaire recognize the need to bring Florian Amidon back. They return to Bakerstown, hoping that Florian can take back control of his life as the respected banker he once was. Unfortunately, Florian struggles to handle the ambitious business empire created by Mr. Brassfield.

With the clairvoyant's intervention, Florian temporarily transforms back into Mr. Brassfield, displaying great success in both business and politics. However, he also reveals unscrupulous behavior, such as unjustly treating a poor man who resisted bribery and engaging in flirtatious behavior with other women while being committed to his sweetheart.

Recognizing the need for balance and redemption, the clairvoyant works to merge the two identities of Florian Amidon and Mr. Brassfield. As Florian, he saves a struggling family from a gas leak and secures the release of an innocent man from jail. Additionally, with the clairvoyant's guidance, Florian reconciles with his sweetheart, explaining that the process will lead to a harmonious blending of their respective qualities, with the negative aspects neutralized.

== Cast ==
- Douglas Fairbanks - Florian Amidon/Eugene Brassfield
- Margery Wilson - Elizabeth Waldron
- Richard Cummings - Judge Blodgett
- Olga Grey - Madame Leclaire
- Gladys Brockwell - Daisy "Strawberry" Scarlett
- Monroe Salisbury - Hotel Clerk
- William Lowery - Brassfield's Political Opponent
- Tom Kennedy - Brassfield's Heavy
- Kate Toncray - Wife of Brassfield's Political Opponent
- Lillian Langdon - Mrs. Waldron

Double Trouble (1915)
