= Berkeley Springs station =

- Berkeley Springs Train Depot
- U.S. National Register of Historic Places
- U.S. Historic district – Contributing property
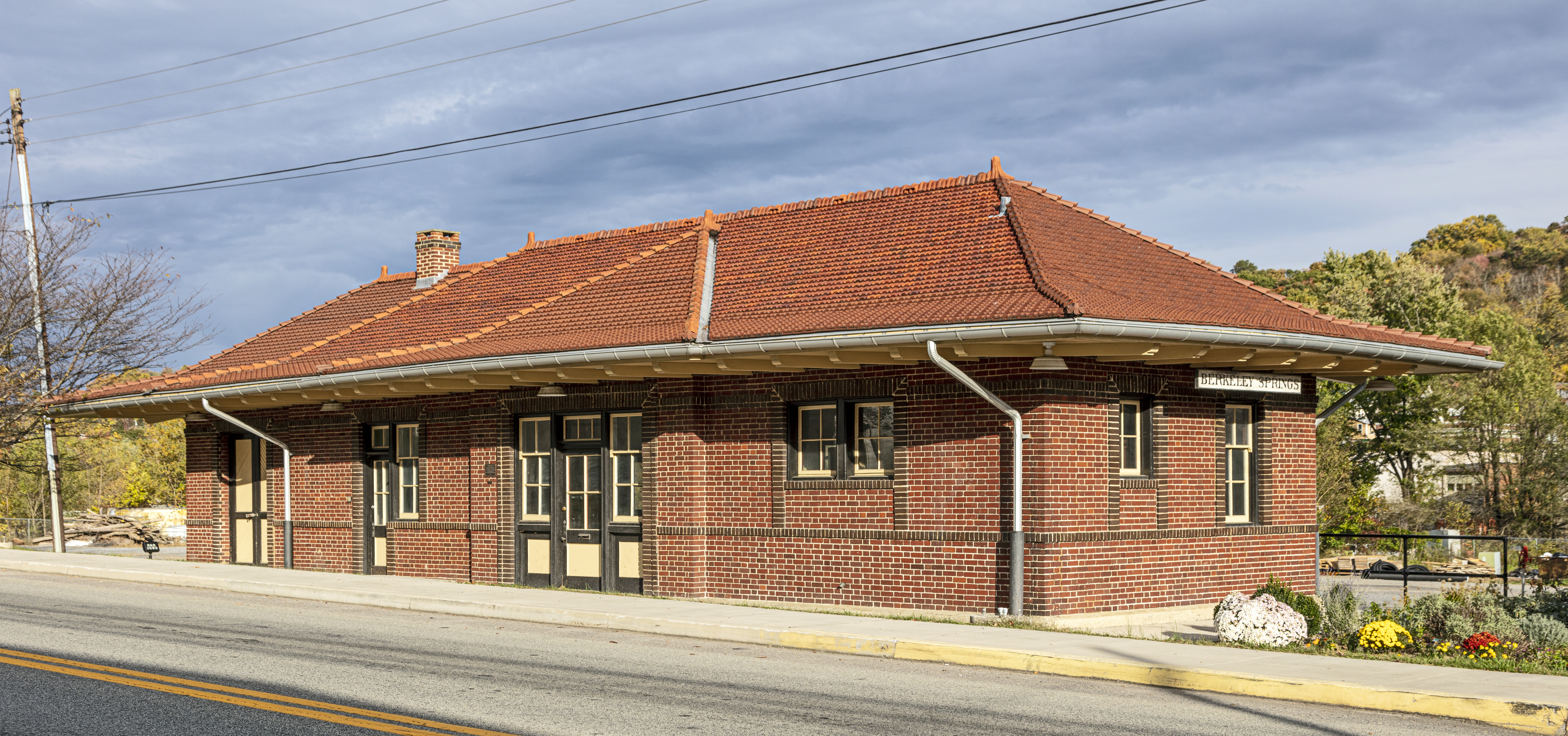
- Berkeley Springs Train Depot in 2020

- Location within Eastern Panhandle of West Virginia Location within West Virginia Location within the United States
- Location: 342 N. Washington St., Berkeley Springs, West Virginia
- Coordinates: 39°37′52″N 78°13′28″W
- Area: less than one acre
- Built: 1915
- Architect: Baltimore and Ohio Railroad
- Architectural style: Mission/Spanish Revival
- NRHP reference No.: 00001313
- Added to NRHP: March 23, 2001

Berkeley Springs station is a historic railway depot located at Berkeley Springs, Morgan County, West Virginia. The depot is a one-story, rectangular red brick building with a bell-cast, red tile roof and measures approximately 80 feet long by 20 feet wide. It features Mission Revival style details.

== History ==
It was built in 1915 by the Baltimore and Ohio Railroad. At its peak in the 1920s and 1930s the railroad spur was used for shipping produce and pulpwood. It ceased use as a passenger depot in 1935. Up until the 1990s, the town's administrative office, municipal court and police department were housed in the depot. After that it was used as a music shop and art gallery, among other things. It is located within the Town of Bath Historic District, listed on the National Register of Historic Places in 2001 as the Berkeley Springs Train Depot. It is owned by the Town of Bath along with the adjoining 2.1 acres acquired from CSX.

== Rehabilitation ==
A group of volunteers organized in 2008 to rehabilitate the depot. In 2009 and 2010, the West Virginia State Historic Preservation Office and the Governor's Office of Economic Development provided a grant to the town for initial work to repair the roof and in 2010, the WV Eastern Panhandle Regional Planning and Development Council awarded the town a $32,000 West Virginia Energy Efficiency & Conservation Grant to pay some of the cost of installation and replacement of the HVAC system and insulation. That year, extensive carpentry repair of the roof sheathing was performed and during the summer, most of the historic roof tiles were removed and stored for incorporating into a roof rehabilitation. Then, in 2011, the depot was issued a Federal Highway Administration Transportation Enhancement grant to refurbish the distinctive tile roof, restore the interior to its 1915-era look and rehabilitate some of the surrounding land. Work on the first phase of the rehabilitation, dealing with the exterior and the roof, begin in April 2015. The tiles that were removed and those that were missing were an exact match to those from 100 years ago. In 2016, the Town received a federal Transportation Alternatives grant toward design of the interior restoration; hazardous material remediation; waterproofing of the structure's cellar; electrical-system and plumbing upgrades; and design of a new heating, ventilation and air-conditioning system.

In November 2024 the town signed a ten-year lease with Travel Berkeley Springs (Morgan County's Convention & Visitor's Bureau) to serve as the official welcome center.
