= Sloat-Horn-Rossell House =

Historic house in West Virginia, United States

- U.S. National Register of Historic Places
- U.S. Historic district – Contributing property
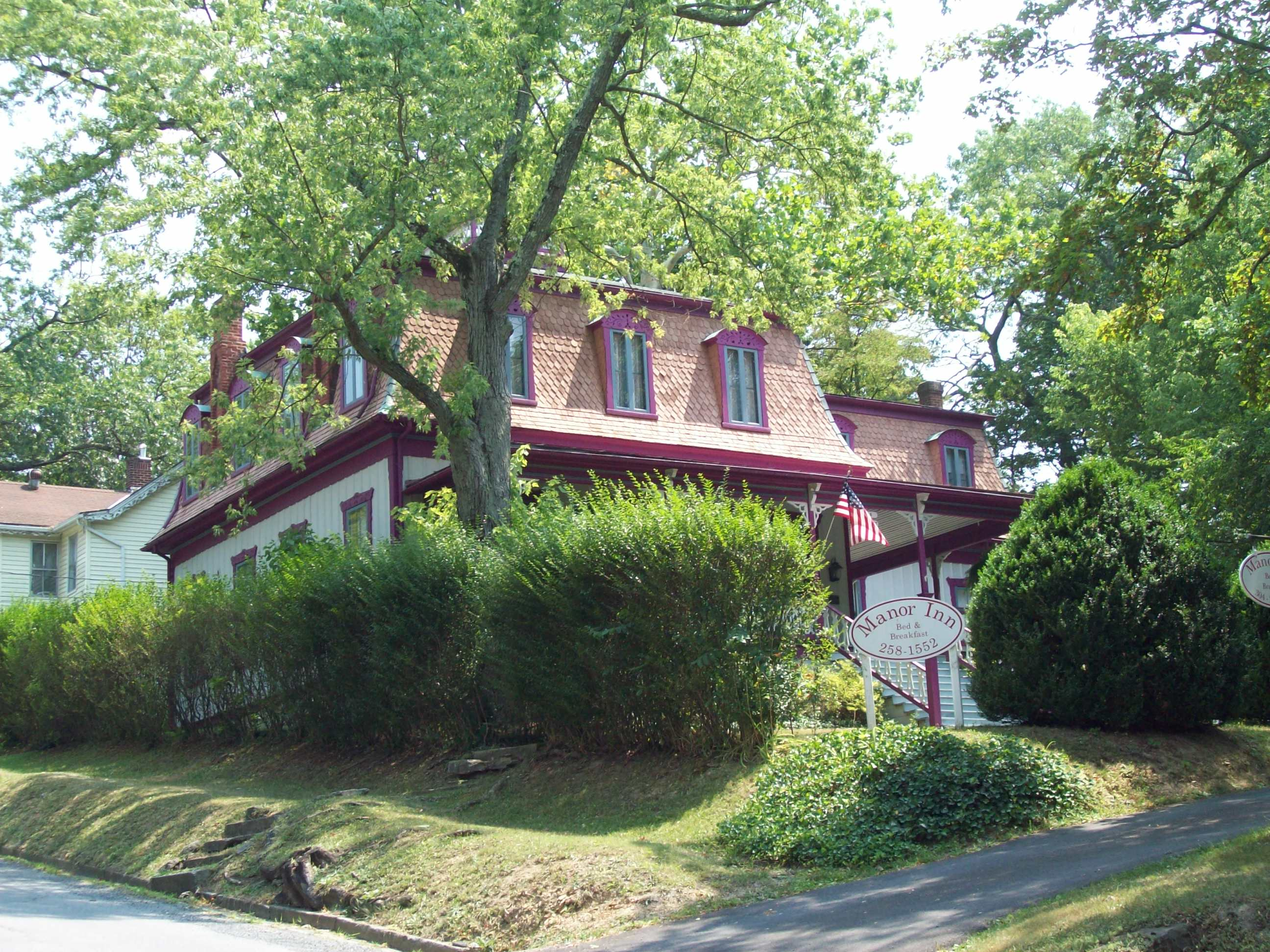
- Sloat-Horn-Rossell House, July 2011

- Location within Eastern Panhandle of West Virginia Location within West Virginia Location within the United States
- Location: 234 Fairfax St., Berkeley Springs, West Virginia
- Coordinates: 39°37′37″N 78°13′34″W
- Area: 0.5 acres (0.20 ha)
- Built: 1879
- Architect: Hunter, John W. & J. D.
- Architectural style: Second Empire
- NRHP reference No.: 84003643
- Added to NRHP: August 23, 1984

Sloat-Horn-Rossell House, also known as "The Manor," is a historic home located at Berkeley Springs, Morgan County, West Virginia. It was built in 1879, and is a large two-story Second Empire style dwelling with board-and-batten siding. It is roughly L-shaped consisting of a roughly square main unit and a smaller rectangular kitchen and servant quarter extension.

It was listed on the National Register of Historic Places in 1984. It is located within the Town of Bath Historic District, listed on the National Register of Historic Places in 2009.
