= T. H. B. Dawson House =

Historic house in West Virginia, United States

- U.S. National Register of Historic Places
- U.S. Historic district – Contributing property
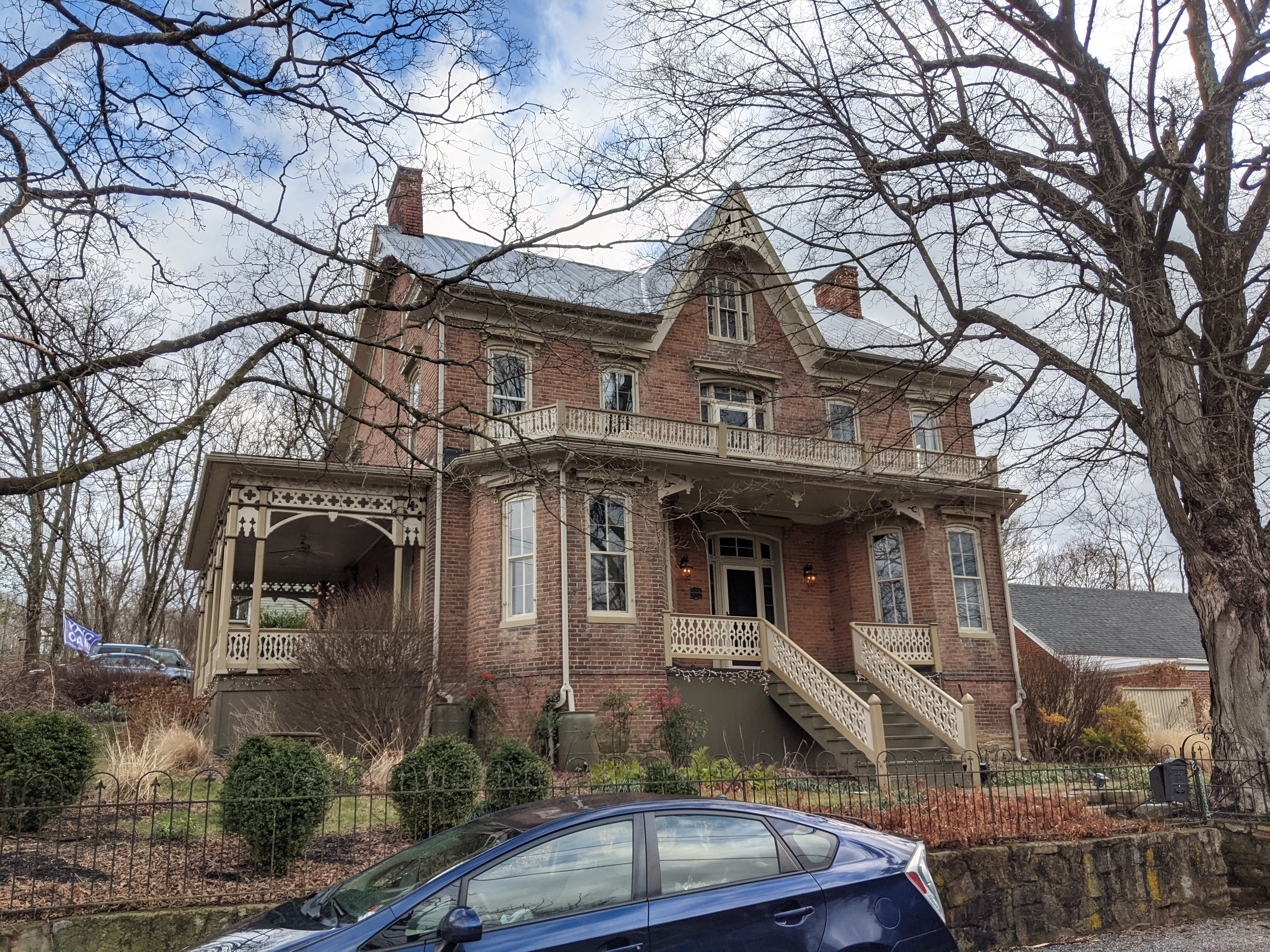
- T. H. B. Dawson House, January 2021

- Location within Eastern Panhandle of West Virginia Location within West Virginia Location within the United States
- Location: 139 S. Green St., Berkeley Springs, West Virginia
- Coordinates: 39°37′27″N 78°13′39″W
- Area: 0.3 acres (0.12 ha)
- Built: 1880
- Architect: Hunter, H.H. & J.W.
- Architectural style: Gothic, Italianate
- NRHP reference No.: 83003247
- Added to NRHP: February 10, 1983

T. H. B. Dawson House is a historic home located at Berkeley Springs, Morgan County, West Virginia. It was built in 1880 and is an L-shaped, two-story, brick house with highly ornate porches at the front and side elevations. It features Gothic Revival and Italianate decorative elements. The house was built for T. H. B. (Thomas Hart Benton) Dawson (1840-1921), a native of Berkeley Springs who attained prominence in community service and business affairs. It 1866, he was elected county clerk of Morgan County and held that position for 36 years.

It was listed on the National Register of Historic Places in 1983. It is located within the Town of Bath Historic District, listed on the National Register of Historic Places in 2009.
