= Judge John W. Wright Cottage =

Historic house in West Virginia, United States

- U.S. National Register of Historic Places
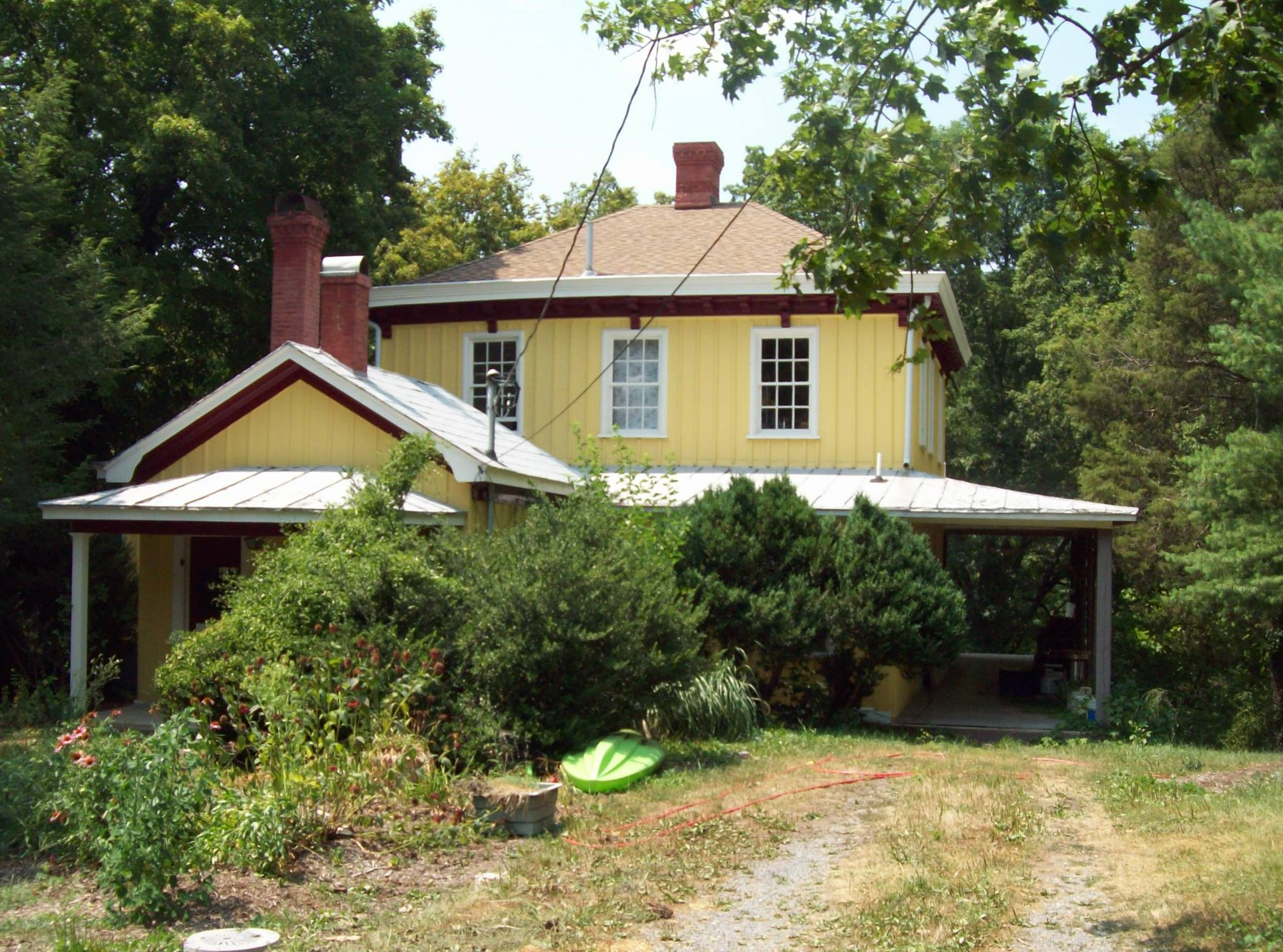
- Judge John W. Wright Cottage, July 2011

- Location within Eastern Panhandle of West Virginia Location within West Virginia Location within the United States
- Location: 156 S. Green St., Berkeley Springs, West Virginia
- Coordinates: 39°37′28″N 78°13′40″W
- Area: 0.4 acres (0.16 ha)
- Built: 1872
- Architectural style: Italianate
- NRHP reference No.: 86000896
- Added to NRHP: April 28, 1986

Judge John W. Wright Cottage, also known as "Wisteria Cottage," is a historic home located at Berkeley Springs, Morgan County, West Virginia. It was built in 1872, and is a two-story, frame residence of board-and-batten construction in the late Italianate style. It features a simple hipped roof and a three-sided Victorian-era verandah and a one-story gable-roofed kitchen wing. The house was originally built as a summer home for John W. Wright, an influential 19th-century Federal jurist and associate of Abraham Lincoln.

It was listed on the National Register of Historic Places in 1986. It is located within the Town of Bath Historic District, listed on the National Register of Historic Places in 2009.
