= Clarence Hovermale House =

Historic house in West Virginia, United States

- U.S. National Register of Historic Places
- U.S. Historic district – Contributing property
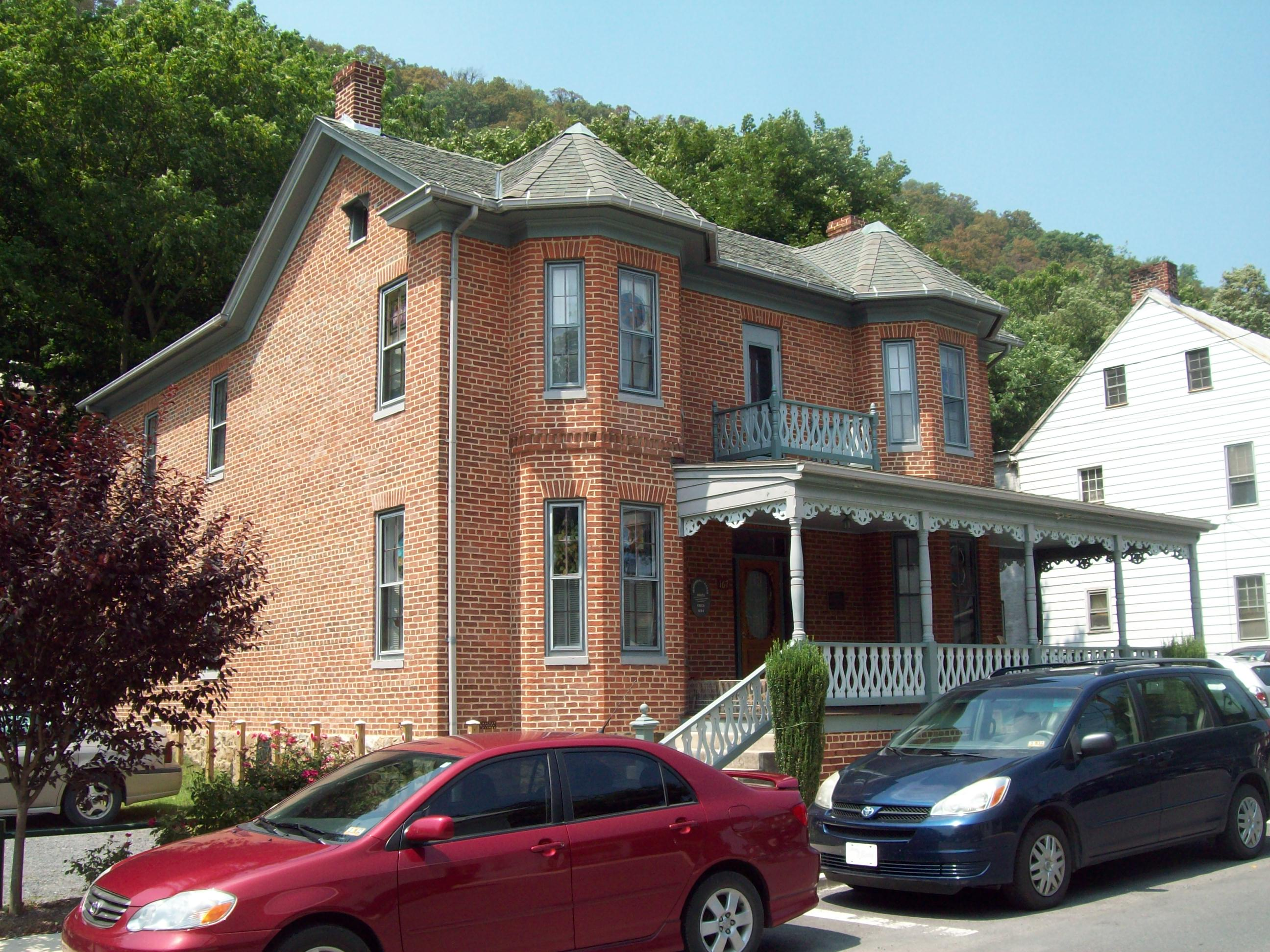
- Clarence Hovermale House, July 2011

- Location within Eastern Panhandle of West Virginia Location within West Virginia Location within the United States
- Location: 167 Wilkes St., Berkeley Springs, West Virginia
- Coordinates: 39°37′42″N 78°13′41″W
- Area: less than one acre
- Built: 1884
- Architectural style: Queen Anne
- NRHP reference No.: 03000350
- Added to NRHP: May 2, 2003

Clarence Hovermale House, also known as Hovermale-Mendenhall House and most recently the Mendenhall 1884 Inn, is a historic home located at Berkeley Springs, Morgan County, West Virginia. It was built in 1884, and is a two-story, brick Queen Anne style dwelling that follows a modified, ell-shaped "I"-house plan. Also on the property is a shed, built about 1860.

It was listed on the National Register of Historic Places in 2003. It is located within the Town of Bath Historic District, listed on the National Register of Historic Places in 2009.
