= Town of Bath Historic District =

Historic district in West Virginia, United States

- U.S. National Register of Historic Places
- U.S. Historic district
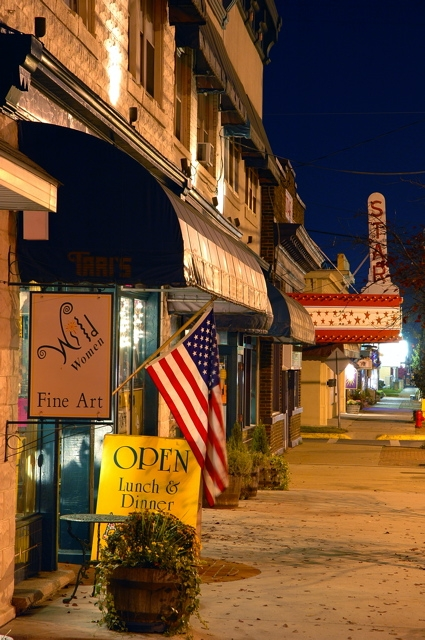
- Downtown Berkeley Springs, 2004

- Location within Eastern Panhandle of West Virginia Location within West Virginia Location within the United States
- Location: Roughly Washington and Fairfax Sts. and adjacent blocks, Berkeley Springs, West Virginia
- Coordinates: 39°37′36″N 78°13′40″W
- Area: 115 acres (47 ha)
- Built: 1776-1959
- Architect: Hunter, H.H. (builder)
- NRHP reference No.: 09000245
- Added to NRHP: April 23, 2009

Town of Bath Historic District is a national historic district located at Berkeley Springs, Morgan County, West Virginia. The district originally encompassed 218 contributing buildings, 3 contributing sites, 6 contributing structures, and 1 contributing object. It consists of the community's central business district, along with the previously listed Berkeley Springs State Park, a small industrial area east of the downtown, and residential areas surrounding the downtown which also contain several churches and two cemeteries. The buildings are generally two stories in height and are primarily built of brick, wood, and concrete block, and set on foundations of native limestone and brick. Located within the district boundaries are the previously listed Berkeley Springs Train Depot, T. H. B. Dawson House, the Clarence Hovermale House also known as the Mendenhall 1884 Inn, the Sloat-Horn-Rossell House, and the Judge John W. Wright Cottage.

== 2021 resurvey ==
In 2021 a contract was let to undertake a periodic resurvey of the historic district to assess the condition, and look at possible expansion. The report noted the historic fabric was in poor condition, and very few buildings since 1950 had not undergone character-altering modifications. Most of the historic buildings have been re-sided with vinyl or aluminum and/or have vinyl replacement windows and replacement porch parts, with original millwork either truncated or missing entirely. The report also recommended two buildings be removed due to a lack of historic integrity, and noted seven contributing buildings/structures had been demolished since the original survey of the district in 2008.

== 2024 update ==
The Town of Bath Historic Landmarks Commission (HLC) met on January 25, 2024, and voted to remove three properties from the list of contributing buildings to the Town of Bath Historic District list. Two properties were removed because of recent exterior modifications done by the property owners, and the third was removed due to it inadvertently being listed based on an incorrect construction date. In addition to voting to remove three properties the meeting agenda also called for discussion on removing two other properties from the list of contributing buildings due to safety concerns over their structural condition. No action was taken on their removal at the meeting.

The Town of Bath Historic District was listed on the National Register of Historic Places in 2009.
