= Herbert Quick =

American novelist

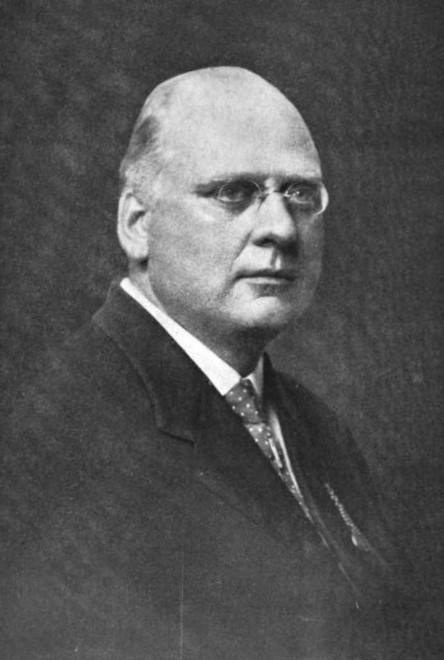

27th Mayor of Sioux City, Iowa
- In office January 1, 1898 – January 1, 1900
- Preceded by: J. M. Cleland
- Succeeded by: A. H. Burton

Personal details
- Born: John Herbert Quick; October 23, 1861 Steamboat Rock, Iowa, U.S.
- Died: May 10, 1925 (aged 63) Columbia, Missouri, U.S.
- Spouse: Ella Corey
- Occupation: Lawyer; author; businessman

John Herbert Quick (October 23, 1861 – May 10, 1925) was an American writer and politician.

== Biography ==
Born October 23, 1861, near Steamboat Rock, Grundy County, Iowa, to Martin and Margaret Coleman Quick, he was afflicted with polio as a child. He married Ella Corey in 1890.

When he was eight, Quick's family moved to Grundy Center, where he lived until 1880. Around that time he became a teacher, an occupation he followed until he passed the bar exam and moved to Sioux City. In 1908 he was the associate editor of Robert LaFollette's Weekly Magazine, in Madison, Wisconsin. From 1909 to 1916 he was the editor of the magazine Farm and Fireside, published in Springfield, Ohio.

Quick established a law firm in Sioux City, where he practiced for 19 years. He also became a businessman and later served as the 27th Mayor of Sioux City, Iowa from 1898 to 1900. An historical marker, Herbert Quick Ravine, can be found in Sioux City. The plaque reads "Named in Memory of Herbert Quick. Statesman, Writer, Mayor of Sioux City. He Knew and Loved the Prairie's of Iowa, 1861-1925."

His best known works are the Midland Trilogy of Vandemark's Folly (1922), The Hawkeye (1923), and The Invisible Woman (1924). The fictional stories describe the life of an Iowa pioneer.

An early environmentalist, his best known non-fiction work was On Board the Good Ship Earth (1913). He also wrote an autobiography, One Man's Life (1925).

Quick's 1906 comic novel, Double Trouble, or, Every Hero His Own Villain was the basis for a 1915 silent film produced by D.W. Griffith, directed by Christy Cabanne, and starring Douglas Fairbanks in one of his earliest film roles.

Quick died on May 10, 1925, in Columbia, Missouri.

== Legacy ==
The John Herbert Quick House near Berkeley Springs, Morgan County, West Virginia, was listed on the National Register of Historic Places in 1984. The Herbert Quick Schoolhouse, a historical, one-room schoolhouse, is in Grundy Center, Iowa.
