= James A. and Lottie J. (Congdon) Quick House =

Historic house in Michigan, United States

- U.S. National Register of Historic Places
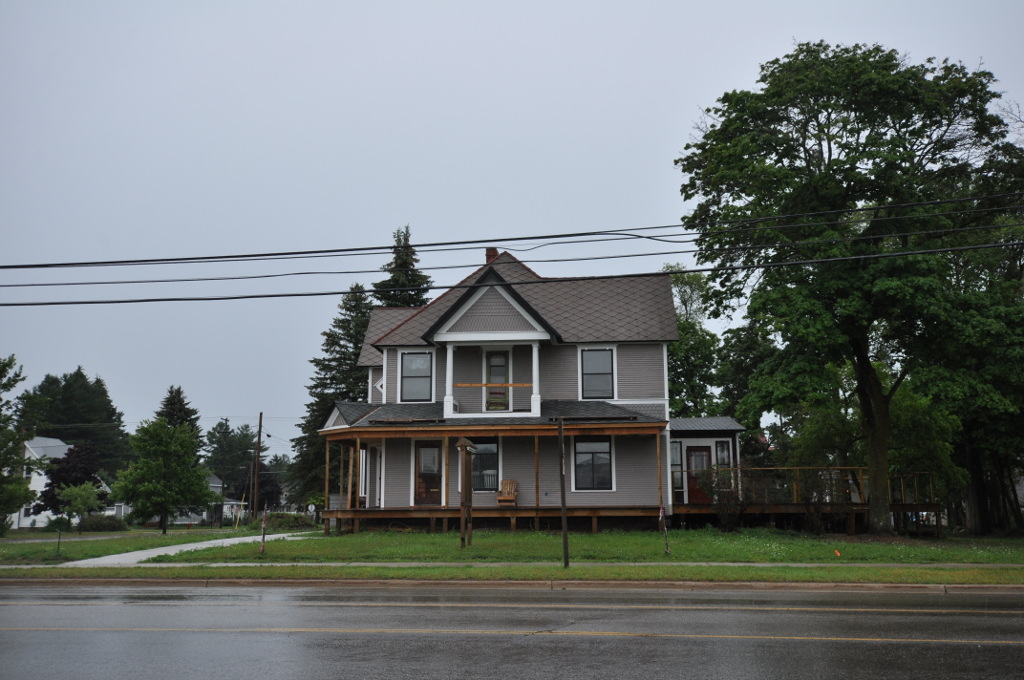
- Quick House in 2017

- Location within Michigan Location within the United States
- Interactive map
- Location: 120 N. Center Ave., Gaylord, Michigan
- Coordinates: 45°1′41″N 84°40′25″W
- Built: 1900
- Architectural style: Queen Anne
- NRHP reference No.: 16000509
- Added to NRHP: August 4, 2016

The James A. and Lottie J. (Congdon) Quick House is a private house located at 120 North Center Avenue in Gaylord, Michigan. It was listed on the National Register of Historic Places in 2016.

== History ==
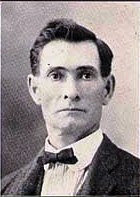
James A Quick

James A. Quick was one of the prominent citizens of Gaylord. He was born in Oakland County, Michigan, on October 7, 1857, and worked on his father's farm until he moved to the Gaylord area in 1881, following his older brother Charles who had moved to the area two years earlier. The two established a livery barn located across the street from where this house now stands. They operated the barn until 1891, after which the brothers started a mercantile business in Gould City, Michigan. They returned to Gaylord in 1895 and opened a new Quick Brothers store. The brothers partnered with Almon Comstock and established a hardware store, a bank, and were active in real estate.

James and Charles Quick purchased the lot this house sits on in 1890. James Quick constructed a house on the lot in 1900, but did not buy out his brother's interest until 1903. In 1902, James Quick suffered an illness that caused him to withdraw from his business, although he did later serve as a village trustee. He lived in this house until his death in 1909.

James' wife Lottie took over his business after his death in 1909, as well as running a millinery store she had opened in 1906. However, by 1912 she had sold her Gaylord business, opened a new millinery store in Detroit, and moved to that city, although she continued to manage the Quick businesses in Gaylord. The Quick house remained vacant for a year, and in 1913 Dr. Harry Knapp purchased it, intending to use it for his residence and medical office. Knapp constructed a separate patient entrance to the house.

In 1919, the dentist Dr. William Housen moved into the house. and in 1921 another dentist, Dr. Charles Saunders, purchased the house. Saunders both lived in and practiced dentistry out of the house for a time, but by 1936 had relocated his practice downtown. In about 1950 he constructed an addition to the house. Saunders lived in the Quick house until his death in 1970. His wife Helen continued to live in the house until her death in 1999. The house has been vacant since that time. Applegate Building purchased the house in 2013 and as of 2016 plans to rehabilitate it into a restaurant.

== Description ==
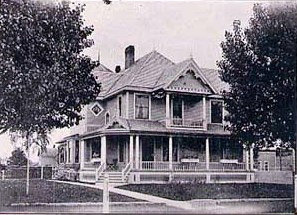
Quick House in 1905

The Quick house is a two-story cross-gable hipped roof wood frame Queen Anne home, with clapboard siding and decorative shingling, constructed in 1900. It sits on an uncoursed fieldstone foundation, and is roofed with faux diamond slate asphalt shingles applied over cedar shingles.

The front of the house features a wraparound hipped roof open porch, with a turned-baluster railing that spans the entire facade. The opening to the porch is framed by Tuscan columns. One bay of the porch was enclosed in the mid-twentieth century to form a sunroom. The original wood front door is still on the porch, near a large window. Above the porch is a second-story balcony. The gable above is shingled, and to either side displays a large one-over-one double-hung window.

The interior of the house is substantially original. The first-floor woodwork is primarily tiger maple, and has never been painted. The original wood flooring is in place throughout the house, save for the kitchen and bathrooms. The entryway, dining room, and front parlor have wood floors finished in concentric squares with alternating maple and oak wood planks. The second-story wood trim is pine. The house also has its original cast iron floor and wall registers and plaster on wood lathe walls.
