= Stotlers Crossroads, West Virginia =

Stotlers Crossroads
- Unincorporated community
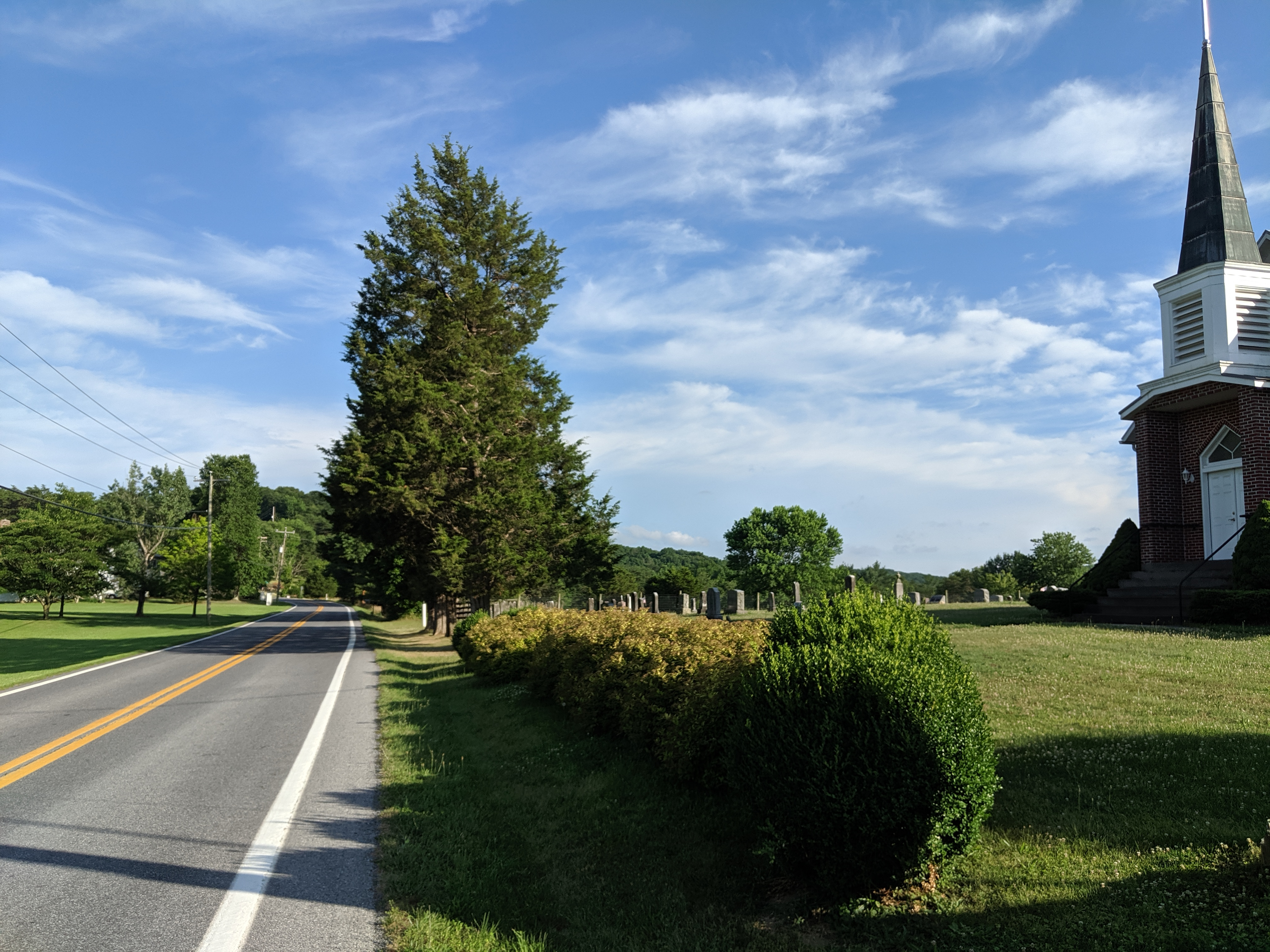
- Mount Olivet Church and cemetery along Winchester Grade Road through Stotlers Crossroads

- Location within the state of West Virginia Stotlers Crossroads (the United States)
- Coordinates: 39°30′48″N 78°13′26″W
- Country: United States
- State: West Virginia
- County: Morgan
- Elevation: 728 ft (222 m)
- Time zone: UTC-5 (Eastern (EST))
  - Summer (DST): UTC-4 (EDT)
- GNIS feature ID: 1555723

Stotlers Crossroads is a small unincorporated community hamlet in southeastern Morgan County, West Virginia. It is situated along Winchester Grade Road (CR 13) between the South and Middle Forks of Sleepy Creek on the eastern flanks of Highland Ridge (942 feet).

The community was named after W. R. Stotler, a merchant at the namesake crossroads. Stotlers Crossroads is the location of several historic buildings, including the Mount Olivet United Methodist Church (1888) and Ambrose Chapel, listed on the National Register of Historic Places.

Stotlers Crossroads is a junction of Winchester Grade Road (CR 13) with the Virginia Line and Highland Ridge Roads (CR 8).
