= Ambrose Chapel =

Historic church and cemetery in Morgan County, West Virginia

- U.S. National Register of Historic Places
- Location within Eastern Panhandle of West Virginia Location within West Virginia Location within the United States
- Location: Winchester Grade Rd., Stotlers Crossroads, West Virginia
- Coordinates: 39°31′43″N 78°13′52″W
- Area: 1.5 acres (0.61 ha)
- Built: 1851
- NRHP reference No.: 98001470
- Added to NRHP: December 15, 1998

Ambrose Chapel is a historic Methodist chapel located at Stotlers Crossroads, Morgan County, West Virginia. The land was deeded for a free meeting house for anyone who preached the gospel of Jesus Christ, in 1797 by (William) Henry Ambrose. The original building was a log structure and was later replaced. The current Chapel was built in 1851 and is a 1 1/2-story rectangular building with hewn log framing, stone foundation, clapboard siding, and metal roof. Also on the property is a cemetery with over 300 burials dating from the early 19th century to about 1945. During the American Civil War it was used as a Confederate field hospital in January, 1862 during Stonewall Jackson's Bath Romney Campaign.

It was listed on the National Register of Historic Places in 1998.
