= John Herbert Quick House =

Historic house in West Virginia, United States

- U.S. National Register of Historic Places
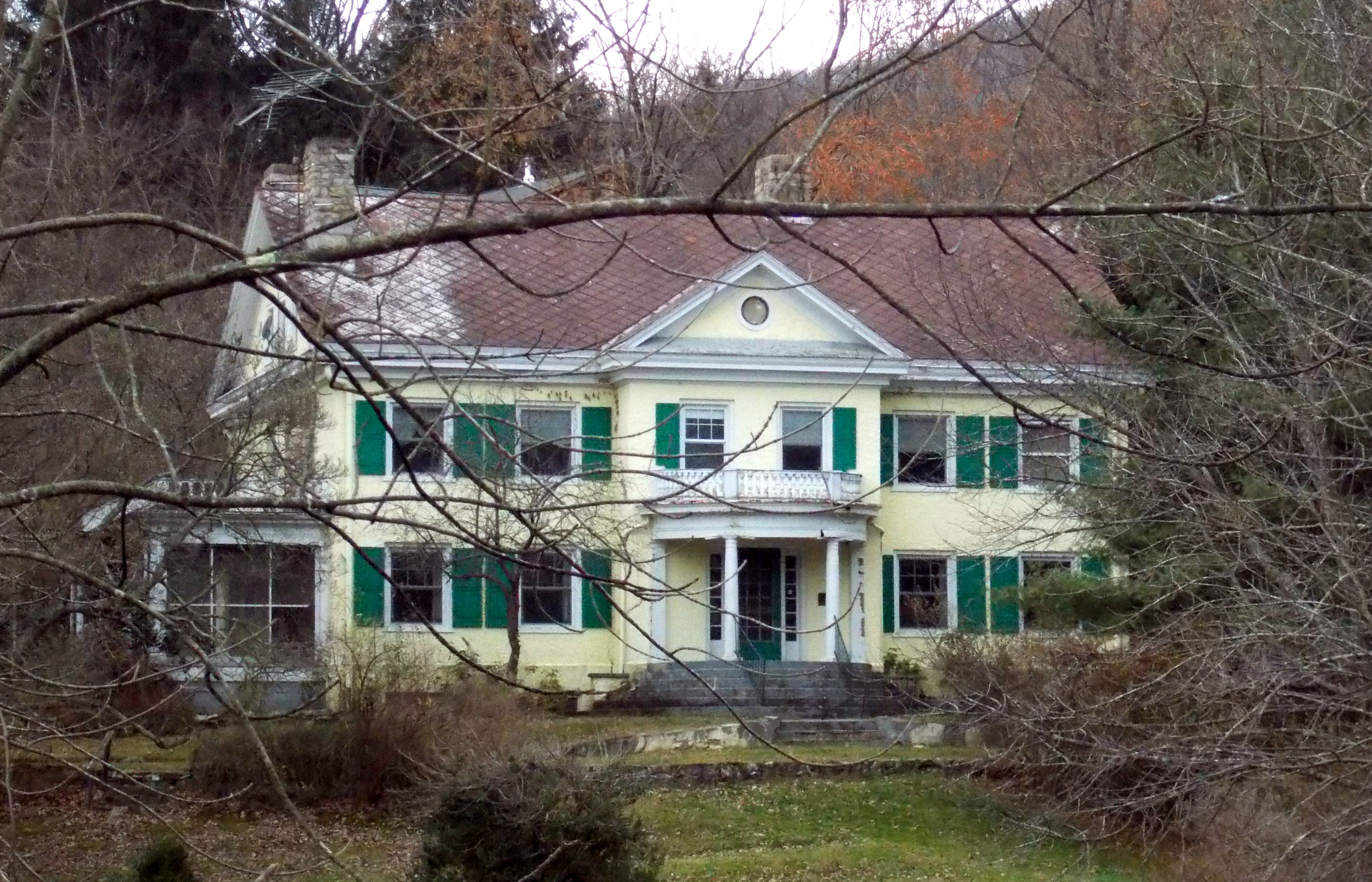
- John Herbert Quick House, November 2012

- Location within Eastern Panhandle of West Virginia Location within West Virginia Location within the United States
- Location: 73 Manor House Lane, Berkeley Springs, West Virginia
- Coordinates: 39°34′56″N 78°16′3″W
- Area: 2 acres (0.81 ha)
- Built: 1913
- Architectural style: Colonial Revival
- NRHP reference No.: 84003639
- Added to NRHP: August 23, 1984

John Herbert Quick House — also known as "Coolfont Manner House" — is a historic home located near Berkeley Springs, Morgan County, West Virginia, US. It was built in 1913, and is a large 2 1/2-story mansion in the Colonial Revival style. The front facade is two stories and features a pediment, with a one-story rounded portico topped by a balustrade. It was built by author John Herbert Quick (1861-1925).

In 1961 the house and about 1200 surrounding acres were acquired by businessman Sam Ashelman, who went on to establish a hotel called the Coolfont Resort in 1965. The property, including the house, was sold to a real estate developer in 2005. In 2017 the house sold to an unnamed bidder for $225,000 as part of an auction of the entire former resort property.

The house was listed on the National Register of Historic Places in 1984. It was called Coolfont Manner House after the springs of the same name.
