= Berkeley Springs, West Virginia =

- Town
- Town of Bath
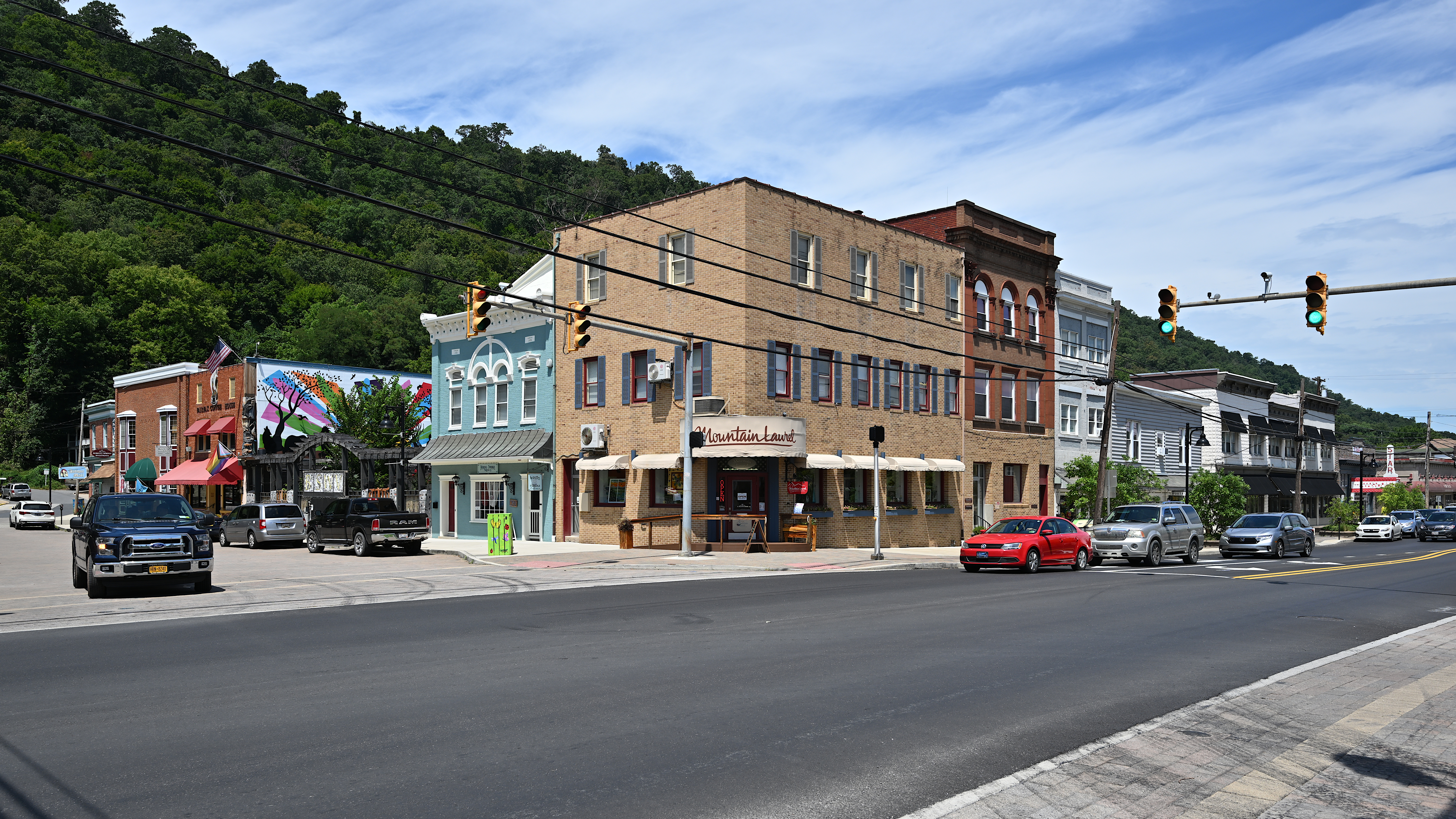
- Town square in Berkeley Springs

- Seal
- Motto: "America's First Spa"
- Interactive map of Berkeley Springs, West Virginia
- Location within West Virginia Location within the United States
- Coordinates: 39°37′32″N 78°13′37″W
- Country: United States
- State: West Virginia
- County: Morgan
- Incorporation: December 1776

Government
  - Type: Mayor–council
  - Mayor: Greg Schene

Area
  - Total: 0.34 sq mi (0.87 km^{2})
  - Land: 0.34 sq mi (0.87 km^{2})
  - Water: 0 sq mi (0.00 km^{2})
- Elevation: 656 ft (200 m)

Population (2020)
  - Total: 753
  - Estimate (2021): 755
  - Density: 1,775.8/sq mi (685.65/km^{2})
- Time zone: UTC−5 (Eastern (EST))
  - Summer (DST): UTC−4 (EDT)
- ZIP Code: 25411
- Area code: 304
- FIPS code: 54-04876
- GNIS feature ID: 1877535
- Website: townofbathwv.gov

Berkeley Springs, formally named Bath, is a town in Morgan County, West Virginia, United States, and its county seat. The population was 758 at the 2020 census. In 1776, the Virginia Legislature incorporated a town around the springs and named it Bath. Since 1802, it has been referred to by the name of its original post office, Berkeley Springs. It is located in the eastern panhandle of West Virginia and is part of the Hagerstown–Martinsburg metropolitan area.

The area contains mineral water springs frequented by Native Americans indigenous to the area, possibly for thousands of years. After settlement by Europeans, the mineral springs drew many visitors from urban areas. Notable colonial visitors to the area included George Washington and James Rumsey. Berkeley Springs remained a popular resort area during the United States' early years. It is the home of the Berkeley Springs International Water Tasting, the longest-running and largest such event in the world. Another local tradition is the Apple Butter Festival, started by a group of local business owners and led by then Mayor Frank Heiner, in 1974. It continues to be a popular resort area, with tourism the primary industry in the county and there being six full-service spas using mineral water.

== History ==
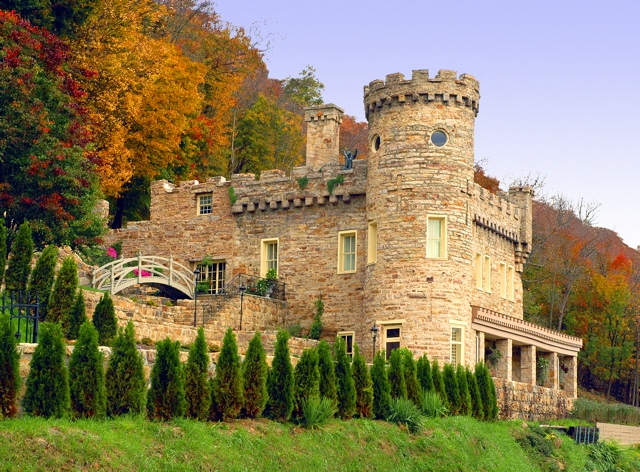
The Samuel Taylor Suit Cottage overlooks the town

During colonial times in 1748, George Washington, then just 16 years old, was part of the team that surveyed the eastern panhandle region for Thomas Fairfax, 6th Lord Fairfax of Cameron. Washington returned several times over the next several years with his half-brother, Lawrence, who was ill, hoping that the warm springs might improve his health. The springs, and their rumored medicinal benefits, attracted numerous Native Americans and Europeans to the area.

While vacationing in the area in 1767, Washington noted how busy the colonial town had become. Lord Fairfax had built a summer home there and a "private bath," making the area a popular destination for Virginia's social elite. With the advent of independence, An act for establishing a town at the Warm Springs in the county of Berkeley was adopted by the Virginia General Assembly in December 1776. Officially, the town was named Bath, in honor of England's spa city Bath.

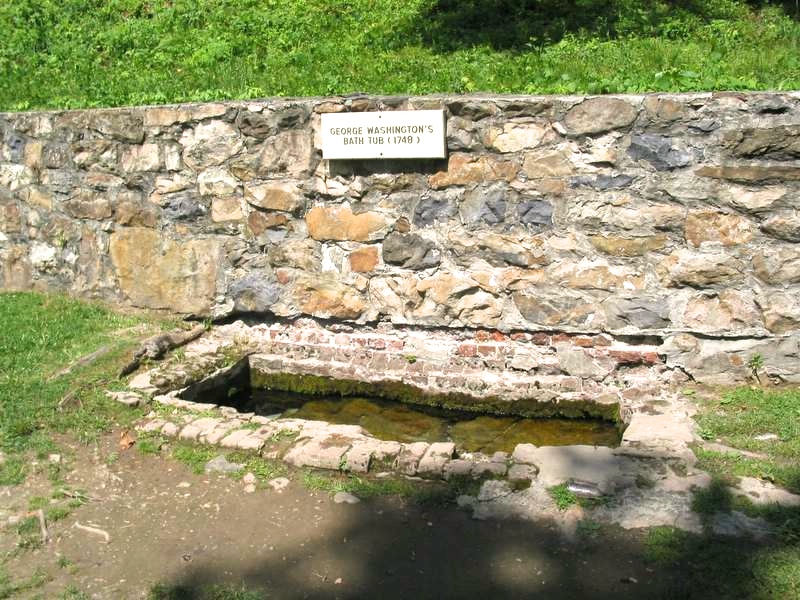
"Bathtub" used by George Washington

George Washington, his family members, and several colonial elites were among the town's first landowners. The town's main north-south street was named Washington, and the main east-west street was named Fairfax. Also, four acres were set aside for "suffering humanity." The area around the springs always was public land known as The Grove and overseen by a state-appointed group of Bath Trustees. This would become Berkeley Springs State Park with its springs and bathhouses, which was made part of the West Virginia state park system in 1925. Nearby, Cacapon State Park was opened in 1933. The mountain that gives its name to the park has an elevation of 2,320 feet (710 m) above sea level.

Bath's population increased during and immediately after the Revolutionary War, as wounded soldiers and others came to the area believing that the warm springs had medicinal qualities.

=== Chronology of names ===
In 1772, the springs were part of the newly formed Berkeley County, named after its colonial governor, Norborne Berkeley. The waters became known as Berkeley Springs because the existing protocol was to name springs after the colonial Virginia county in which they were located. Previously, the area had been called Warm Springs and Medicinal Springs among other names.

Bath became known permanently to the world as Berkeley Springs in 1802 when the Virginia postal system was established in the new nation, and there already was a Bath, Virginia, in Bath County.

In 1861, many residents of Virginia were opposed to Virginia's secession from the United States, some calling the act of secession treasonous. Following the Wheeling Conventions of 1861, a referendum was held in 41 mostly northwestern Virginia counties on whether to secede from Virginia and seek admission to the United States as a new state. An overwhelming majority of voters in these counties voted in favor of the proposal. Confederates commanded by Stonewall Jackson captured Bath during the Romney Expedition in January 1862, and ransacked the homes of local unionists. The United States admitted the State of West Virginia on June 20, 1863. Berkeley Springs remained the conventional name used for the town.

== Geography ==
Berkeley Springs is located in the Appalachian Mountains. The town lies in the eastern panhandle of West Virginia 26 miles (42 km) northwest of Martinsburg, West Virginia and 36 miles (58 km) west of Hagerstown, Maryland. Berkeley Springs is the county seat of Morgan County. Morgan County makes up one of the central counties in the eastern panhandle.

According to the United States Census Bureau, the incorporated town of Bath has a total area of 0.34 square miles (0.88 km^{2}), all land.

There are two rivers in Morgan County. The Potomac makes up the northern border, and the Cacapon River cuts through the center of the county connecting with the Potomac at Great Cacapon. Cacapon and Sleepy Creek Mountain are the two most notable mountains in the county. Berkeley Springs is nestled northwest of the Shenandoah Valley at an elevation of approximately 656 feet (200 m). Warm Spring Run cuts through the center of the town and eventually connects with the Potomac River near Hancock Station. Sleepy Creek connects with the Potomac along River Road north and east of the town.

== Demographics ==
Historical population
Census	Pop.	Note	%±
1850	77		—
1860	2,982		3,772.7%
1870	407		−86.4%
1880	534		31.2%
1900	781		—
1910	864		10.6%
1920	980		13.4%
1930	1,039		6.0%
1940	1,145		10.2%
1950	1,213		5.9%
1960	1,138		−6.2%
1970	944		−17.0%
1980	789		−16.4%
1990	735		−6.8%
2000	663		−9.8%
2010	624		−5.9%
2020	753		20.7%
2021 (est.)	755	▲	0.3%
U.S. Decennial Census

=== 2010 census ===
As of the census of 2010, there were 624 people, 314 households, and 158 families residing in the incorporated town of Bath. The population density was 1,835.3 inhabitants per square mile (708.6/km^{2}). There were 416 housing units at an average density of 1,223.5 per square mile (472.4/km^{2}). The racial makeup of the town was 96.5% White, 0.5% Native American, 0.3% Asian, 1.0% from other races, and 1.8% from two or more races. Hispanic or Latino of any race were 2.7% of the population.

There were 314 households, of which 23.9% had children under the age of 18 living with them, 31.8% were married couples living together, 14.6% had a female householder with no husband present, 3.8% had a male householder with no wife present, and 49.7% were non-families. 43.0% of all households were made up of individuals, and 17.5% had someone living alone who was 65 years of age or older. The average household size was 1.99, and the average family size was 2.74.

The median age in the town was 42.9 years. 21.2% of residents were under the age of 18; 6.5% were between the ages of 18 and 24; 25.1% were from 25 to 44; 27% were from 45 to 64; and 19.9% were 65 years of age or older. The gender makeup of the town was 47.8% male and 52.2% female.

=== 2000 census ===
As of the census of 2000, there were 663 people, 331 households, and 160 families residing in the town. The population density was 2,706.0 inhabitants per square mile (1,044.8/km^{2}). There were 379 housing units at an average density of 1,546.9 per square mile (597.3/km^{2}). The racial makeup of the town was 97.1% White, 1.7% African American, 0.2% Native American, 0.3% from other races, and 0.8% from two or more races. Hispanic or Latino of any race were 0.6% of the population.

There were 331 households, out of which 20.5% had children under the age of 18 living with them, 35.6% were married couples living together, 10.0% had a female householder with no husband present, and 51.4% were non-families. 46.5% of all households were made up of individuals, and 25.1% had someone living alone who was 65 years of age or older. The average household size was 1.98, and the average family size was 2.85.

In the town, the population was spread out, with 19.5% under 18, 11.0% from 18 to 24, 23.4% from 25 to 44, 22.3% from 45 to 64, and 23.8% who were 65 years or older. The median age was 41 years. For every 100 females, there were 80.2 males. For every 100 females age 18 and over, there were 77.4 males.

The median income for a household in the town was $24,934, and the median income for a family was $33,333. Males had a median income of $25,156 versus $23,611 for females. The per capita income for the town was $14,917. About 13.4% of families and 18.7% of the population were below the poverty line, including 26.8% of those under age 18 and 15.7% of those age 65 or over.

== Transportation ==
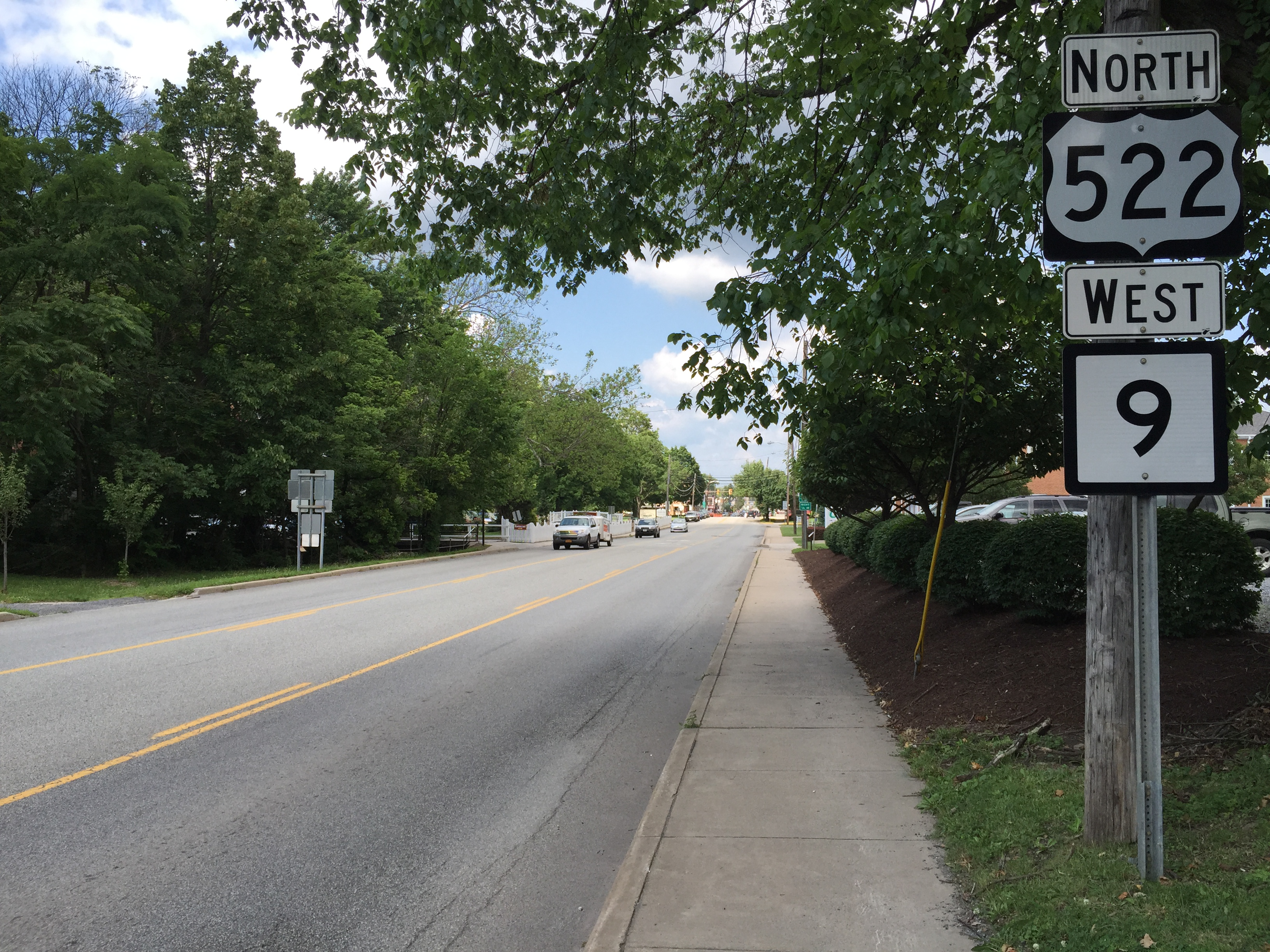
US 522 northbound and WV 9 westbound in Berkeley Springs

Two main highways serve Berkeley Springs. The most prominent of these is U.S. Route 522. US 522 traverses the region in a general north-northeast to south-southwest direction. To the north, US 522 connects Berkeley Springs to Interstate 70 and Interstate 68 near Hancock, Maryland, while heading south provides a connection to Interstate 81 near Winchester, Virginia. The other primary highway serving Berkeley Springs is West Virginia Route 9, oriented in a general northwest-to-southeast alignment. WV 9 heads westward to Paw Paw and continues east to Martinsburg. The two highways run concurrently for a short stretch along Main Street in Berkeley Springs.

== Notable people ==
- Beirne Lay, Jr., U.S. Army aviator
- Tom Netherton, singer, Lawrence Welk Show
- Charles Triplett O'Ferrall, politician
- John Herbert Quick, author
- James Rumsey, early steamboat inventor
- David Hunter Strother, journalist, artist, politician and diplomat
- Lajos Veress, Hungarian military officer, buried in Berkeley Springs

== In popular culture ==
A location in the online multiplayer game Fallout 76 was named and inspired by Berkeley Springs.

== Gallery ==
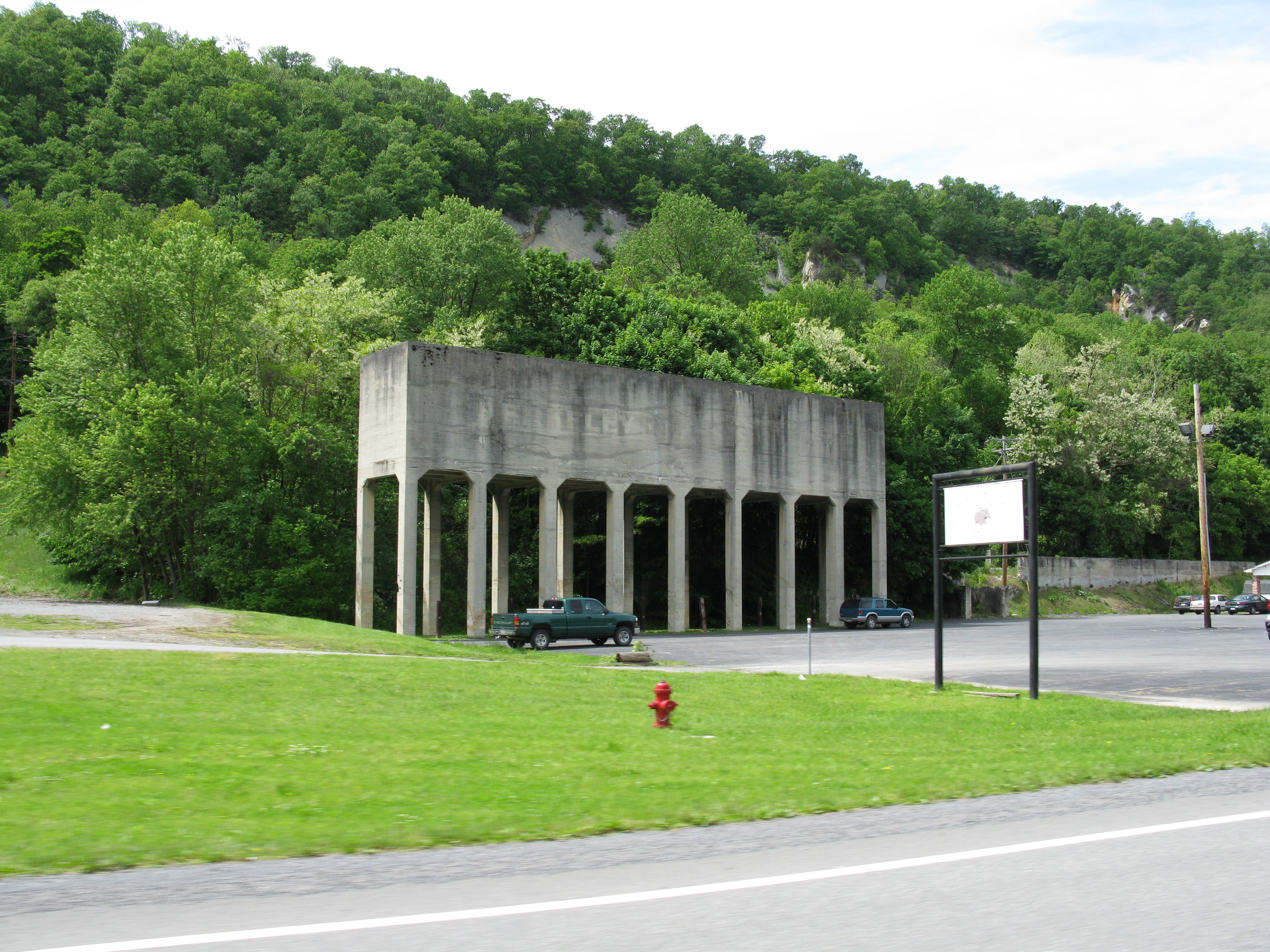
Storage bins no longer in use. At one time, they were used by the local sand mine for loading train cars for distribution.

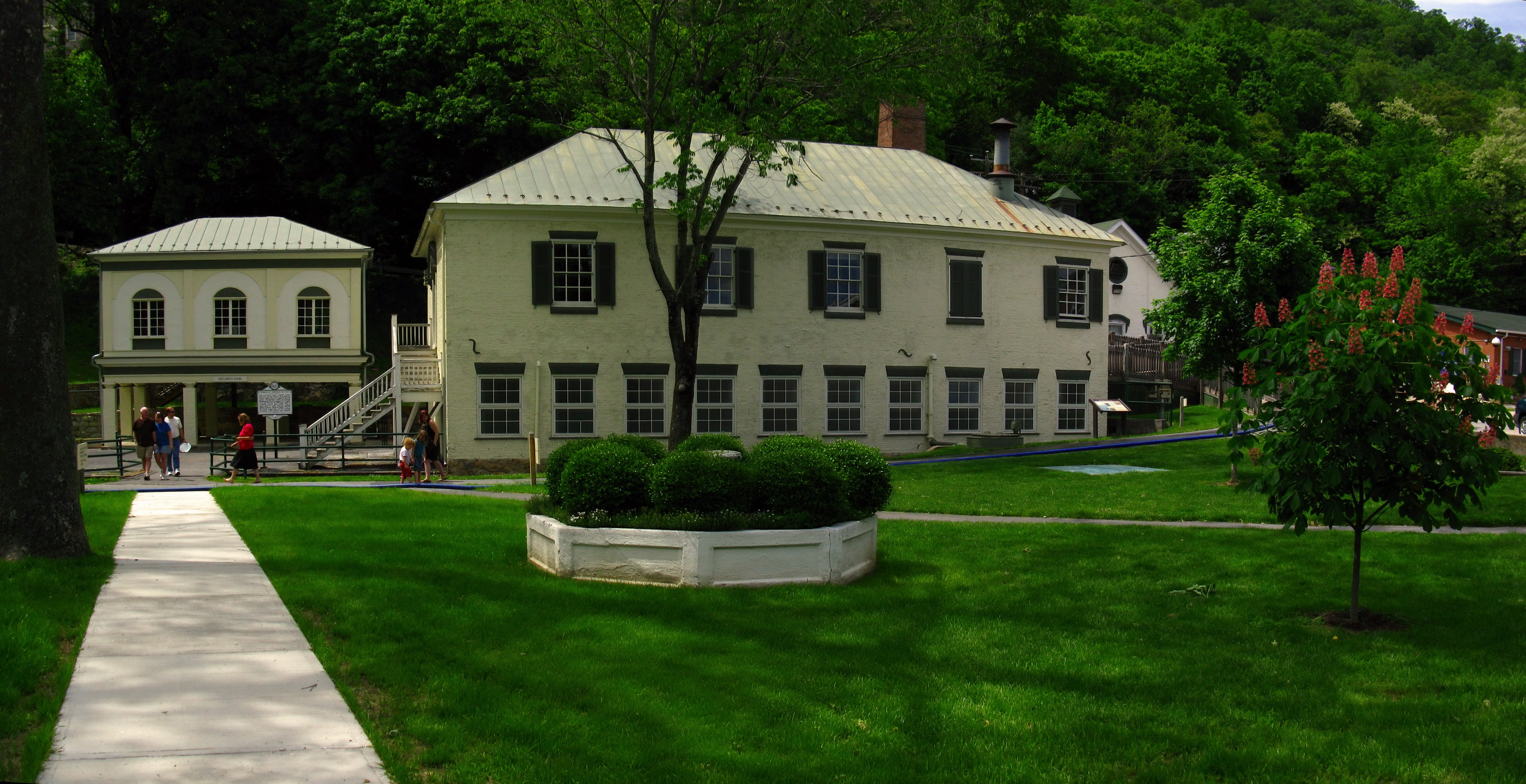
View of part of Berkeley Springs State Park

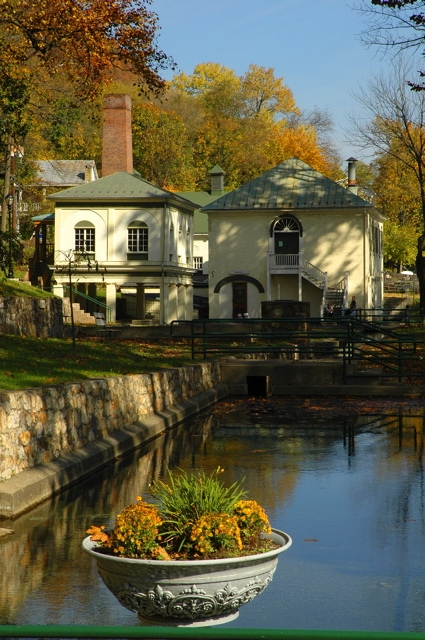
Another view of part of Berkeley Springs State Park, with fall colors

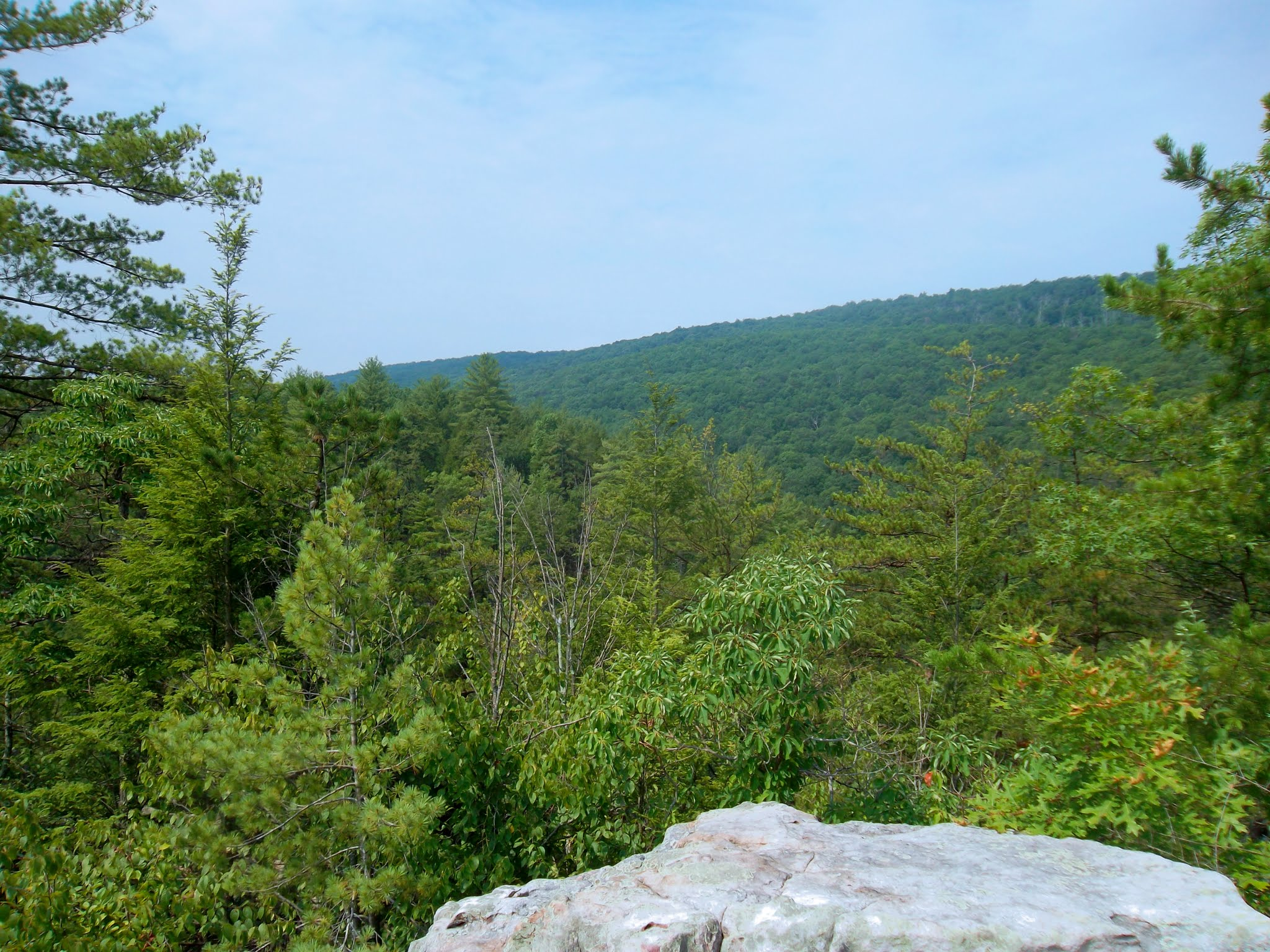
View of Sleepy Creek Mountain from Devil's Nose

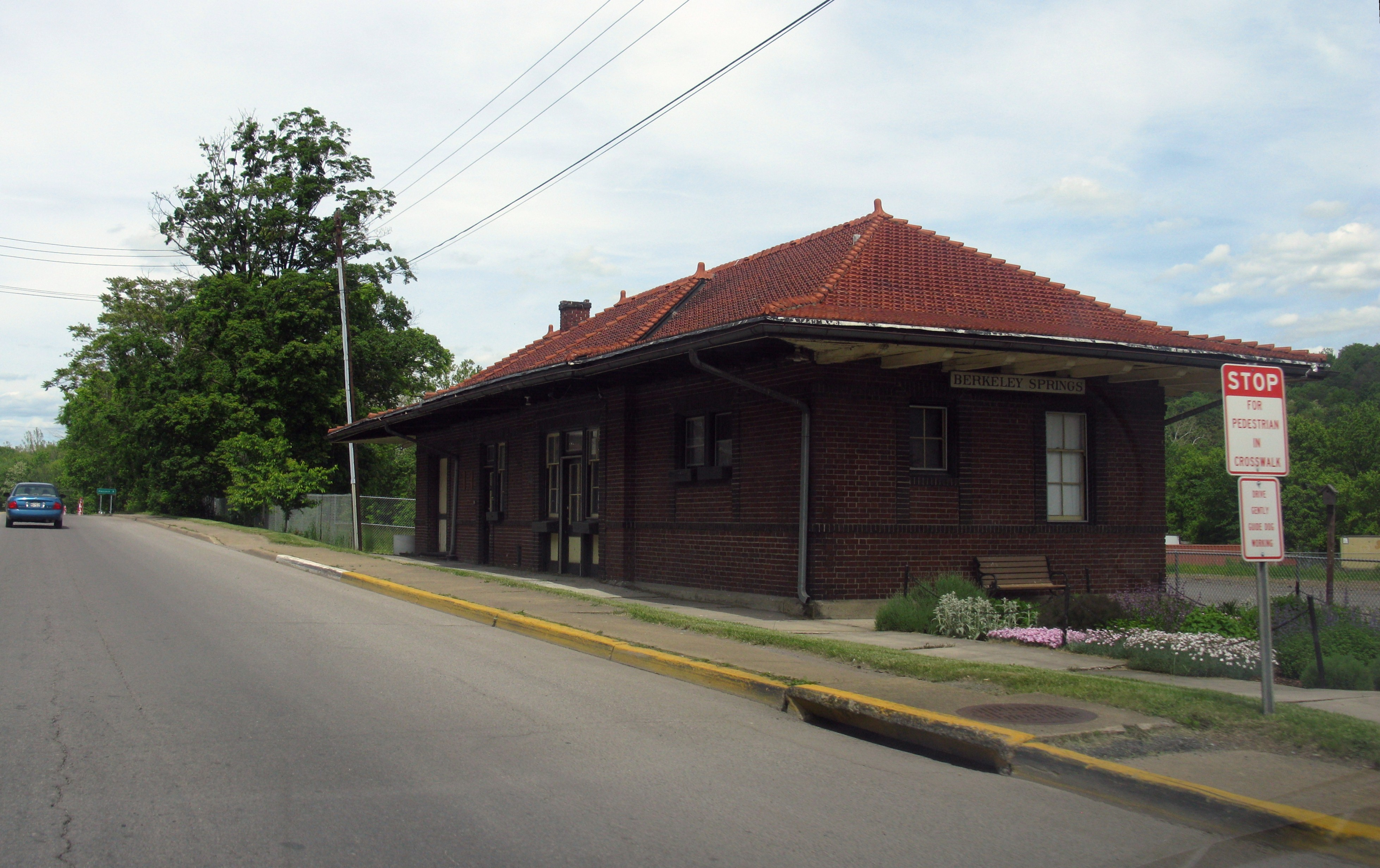
The former train station
