= Winchester metropolitan area, Virginia =

Metropolitan area in the United States

Coordinates: 39°15′N 78°10′W

Winchester metropolitan area
- Metropolitan Statistical Area
- Winchester, VA–WV; Metropolitan Statistical Area
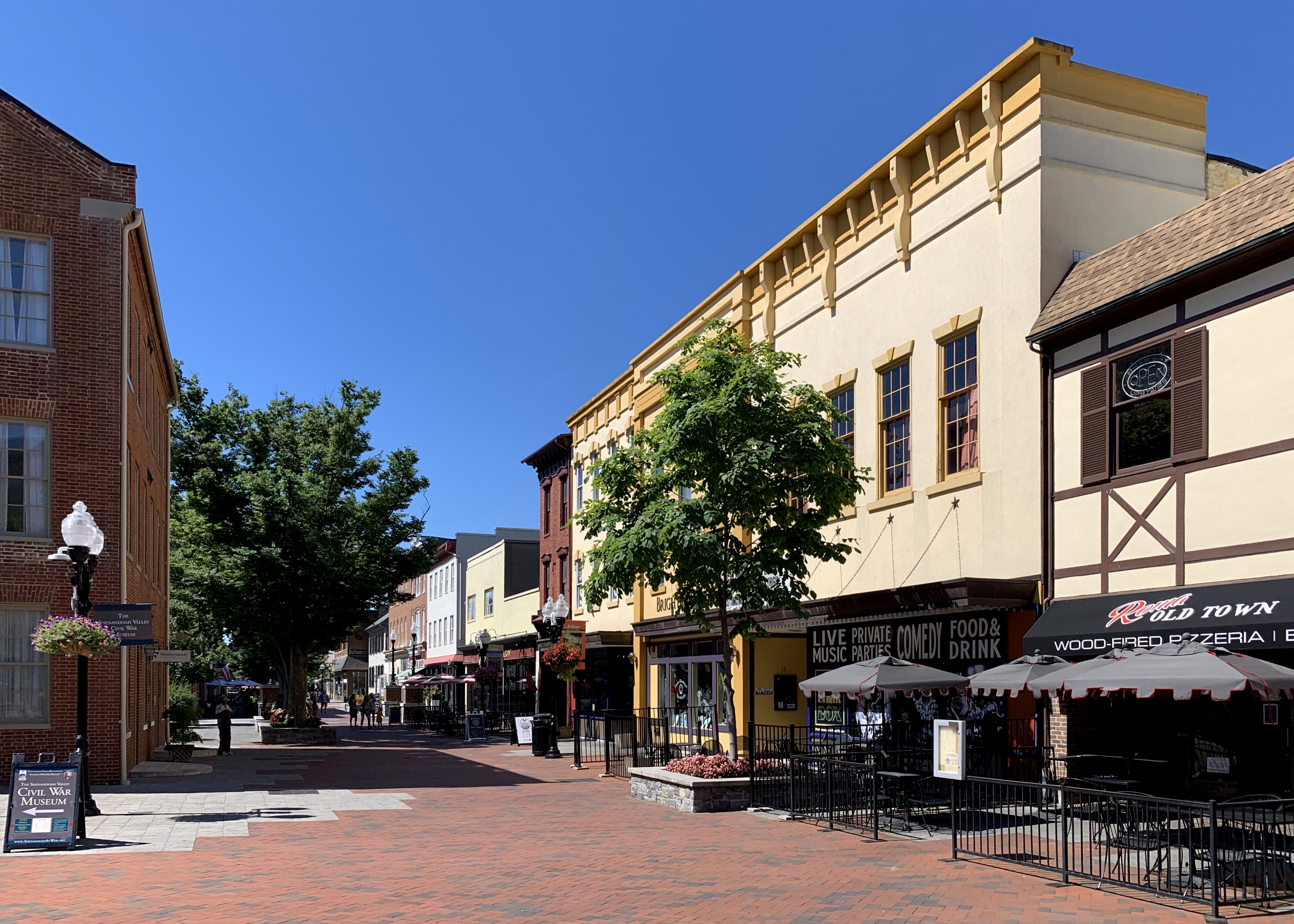
- Loudoun Street Mall in Winchester in July 2020
Map of Winchester, VA–WV MSA
City of Winchester
Winchester, VA–WV MSA
Other Areas in the Washington–Baltimore CSA
- Country: United States
- State: Virginia; West Virginia
- Largest city: Winchester, Virginia
- Other city: Romney, West Virginia

Area
  - Total: 1,063 sq mi (2,754 km^{2})
- Time zone: UTC−5 (EST)
  - Summer (DST): UTC−4 (EDT)

Winchester, VA–WV MSA is a U.S. metropolitan statistical area (MSA) as defined by the United States Office of Management and Budget (OMB) as of June 2003. This should not be confused with the City of Winchester, Virginia, the most populous community within this MSA. The population of the MSA as the 2015 U.S. Census Bureau estimates is 133,836.

== MSA components ==
Note: Since a state constitutional change in 1871, all cities in Virginia are independent cities and they are not legally located in any county. The OMB considers these independent cities to be county-equivalents for the purpose of defining MSAs in Virginia. Each MSA is listed by its counties, then cities, each in alphabetical order, and not by size.

Winchester, VA–WV MSA includes areas in Virginia and the State of West Virginia.

=== Counties ===
- Frederick County, Virginia
- Hampshire County, West Virginia

=== Independent Cities ===
- City of Winchester, Virginia

County	2021 Estimate	2020 Census	Change	Area	Density
Frederick County	93,717	91,419	+2.51%	414 sq mi (1,070 km^{2})	226/sq mi (87/km^{2})
Winchester	28,136	28,120	+0.06%	9.19 sq mi (23.8 km^{2})	3,062/sq mi (1,182/km^{2})
Hampshire County	23,302	23,093	+0.91%	640 sq mi (1,700 km^{2})	36/sq mi (14/km^{2})
Total	145,155	142,632	+1.77%	1,063.19 sq mi (2,753.6 km^{2})	137/sq mi (53/km^{2})

== Communities ==
=== Places with more than 10,000 inhabitants ===
- Winchester (principal city)

=== Places with 1,000 to 10,000 inhabitants ===
- Shawnee Land, Virginia (census-designated place)
- Romney, West Virginia
- Stephens City, Virginia
- Middletown, Virginia

=== Places with fewer than 1,000 inhabitants ===
- Springfield, West Virginia (census-designated place)
- Capon Bridge, West Virginia
- Green Spring, West Virginia (census-designated place)
- Lake Holiday, Virginia (census-designated place)

=== Unincorporated places ===
- Albin, Virginia
- Armel, Virginia
- Augusta, West Virginia
- Barnes Mill, West Virginia
- Bartonsville, Virginia
- Bloomery, West Virginia
- Blues Beach, West Virginia
- Brucetown, Virginia
- Bubbling Spring, West Virginia
- Burnt Factory, Virginia
- Capon Lake, West Virginia
- Capon Springs, West Virginia
- Capon Springs Station, West Virginia
- Cedar Grove, Virginia
- Cedar Hill, Virginia
- Clear Brook, Virginia
- Cold Stream, West Virginia
- Creekvale, West Virginia
- Cross Junction, Virginia
- Davis Ford, West Virginia
- De Haven, Virginia
- Delray, West Virginia
- Dillons Run, West Virginia
- Donaldson, West Virginia
- Forks of Cacapon, West Virginia
- Frenchburg, West Virginia
- Gainesboro, Virginia
- Glebe, West Virginia
- Good, West Virginia
- Gore, Virginia
- Grace, West Virginia
- Gravel Springs, Virginia
- Greenwood, Virginia
- Green Spring, Virginia
- Grimes, Virginia
- Hainesville, West Virginia
- Hanging Rock, West Virginia
- Hayfield, Virginia
- Higginsville, West Virginia
- High View, West Virginia
- Hooks Mills, West Virginia
- Hoy, West Virginia
- Indian Hollow, Virginia
- Intermont, West Virginia
- Jericho, West Virginia
- Jordan Springs, Virginia
- Junction, West Virginia
- Kernstown, Virginia
- Kirby, West Virginia
- Largent, West Virginia
- Leetown, Virginia
- Lehew, West Virginia
- Levels, West Virginia
- Little Cacapon, West Virginia
- Loom, West Virginia
- Marlboro, Virginia
- McQuire, Virginia
- Meadow Mills, Virginia
- Mechanicsburg, West Virginia
- Millbrook, West Virginia
- Millen, West Virginia
- Mill Race Estates, Virginia
- Mount Pleasant, Virginia
- Mount Williams, Virginia
- Mountain Falls, Virginia
- Mountain Falls Park, Virginia
- Nain, Virginia
- Neals Run, West Virginia
- Nero, West Virginia
- North River Mills, West Virginia
- Okonoko, West Virginia
- Opequon, Virginia
- Pancake, West Virginia
- Parkins Mills, Virginia
- Pin Oak, West Virginia
- Pleasant Dale, West Virginia
- Purgitsville, West Virginia
- Rada, West Virginia
- Raven Rocks, West Virginia
- Rest, Virginia
- Reynolds Store, Virginia
- Ridgedale, West Virginia
- Ridings Mill, Virginia
- Rio, West Virginia
- Rock Enon Springs, Virginia
- Round Hill, Virginia
- Ruckman, West Virginia
- Sector, West Virginia
- Sedan, West Virginia
- Shanks, West Virginia
- Shiloh, West Virginia
- Shockeysville, Virginia
- Siler, Virginia
- Slanesville, West Virginia
- South Branch Depot, West Virginia
- Star Tannery, Virginia
- Stephenson, Virginia
- Three Churches, West Virginia
- Valley, West Virginia
- Vance, West Virginia
- Vanderlip, West Virginia
- Vaucluse, Virginia
- Wappocomo, West Virginia
- Welltown, Virginia
- Whitacre, Virginia
- White Hall, Virginia
- Wilde Acres, Virginia
- Woodrow, West Virginia
- Yellow Spring, West Virginia

== See also ==
- Virginia statistical areas
