= Cedar Creek (North Fork Shenandoah River tributary) =

Creek in Virginia United States

Coordinates: 38°59′1.39″N 78°18′58.01″W

Cedar Creek is a 40.5-mile-long (65.2 km) tributary stream of the North Fork Shenandoah River in northern Virginia in the United States. It forms the majority of the boundary between Frederick and Shenandoah counties. Cedar Creek's confluence with the North Fork Shenandoah is located at Strasburg.

It was the site of the 1864 Battle of Cedar Creek in the American Civil War.

== Tributaries ==
Tributary streams are listed from Cedar Creek's headwaters to its mouth.

- Shell Run
- Cold Spring Run
- Paddy Run
- Gravel Springs Run
- Duck Run
- Fall Run
- Lick Run
- Turkey Run
  - Eishelman Run
  - Indian Run
  - Swamp Run
- Mulberry Run
  - Zanes Run
- Middle Marsh Brook
  - Watson Run
- Meadow Brook
- Stickley Run

== List of cities and towns along Cedar Creek ==
- Gravel Springs
- Lebanon Church
- Marlboro
- Meadow Mills
- Oranda
- Star Tannery
- Strasburg
- Zepp

== See also ==
- List of rivers of Virginia
