= John M. Silver =

American politician (1846–1912)

Member of the Virginia House of Delegates from the Frederick County district
- In office December 8, 1887 – March 6, 1890
- Preceded by: John V. Tavenner
- Succeeded by: Joseph A. Miller

Personal details
- Born: John Moore Silver; 1846 Berkeley County, West Virginia, U.S.
- Died: March 17, 1912 (aged 65–66) Welltown, Virginia, U.S.
- Resting place: Winchester, Virginia, U.S.
- Party: Democratic
- Spouse(s): Margaret Davis Parkins (m. 1880; died 1890) Anna Janney (m. 1896)
- Relations: Gray Silver (nephew)
- Children: 4
- Occupation: Farmer; sheriff; politician

John Moore Silver (1846 – March 17, 1912) was an American politician and sheriff from Virginia. He served as a member of the Virginia House of Delegates from 1887 to 1890.

== Early life ==
John Moore Silver was born in 1846 in Berkeley County, West Virginia, to Zepheniah Silver.

== Career ==
Silver was a farmer. He was a member of the board of supervisors of Frederick County, Virginia. He was a Democrat. He served in the Virginia House of Delegates for two terms, representing Frederick County from December 8, 1887, to March 6, 1890. He was a court clerk.

Silver served as sheriff of Frederick County for two terms. He resigned as sheriff in January 1875. He later succeeded Clark H. Purcell as sheriff on July 17, 1910, and served in the role until his death.

== Personal life ==
Silver married Margaret "Maggie" Davis Parkins of Frederick County on April 28, 1880. She died in 1890. They had two sons, Harry and Byard. He married Anna M. Janney, daughter of Daniel Janney and niece of Eli H. Janney, of Frederick County on September 7, 1896. They had two children. His nephew was state senator Gray Silver.

Silver was the elder of the Loudon Street Church in Winchester from September 14, 1891, to March 20, 1900. He died of heart disease on March 17, 1912, aged 66, at his home in Welltown. He was buried at a cemetery in Winchester.
