= Isaacs Creek (Virginia) =

River in Virginia, United States

Coordinates: 39°17′49″N 78°13′34″W

Isaacs Creek is a 15.0-mile-long (24.1 km) tributary stream of Back Creek in Frederick County, Virginia. Isaacs Creek rises on Timber Ridge at the boundary line with Hampshire County, West Virginia, and flows into Back Creek at Grave Hill shortly before Back Creek's confluence with Hogue Creek. The stream is dammed (along with Yeiders Run and other small streams) to create Lake Holiday.

== Tributaries ==
Tributary streams are listed from headwaters to mouth.

- Johnson Run
- Nixon Run
- Big Hollow Run
- Yeiders Run
  - Miller Run
- Little Isaacs Creek
  - Woodpile Hollow Run
  - Crockett Run

== See also ==
- List of Virginia rivers
