= Portsmouth Council =

Portsmouth Council may be:

- Portsmouth City Council, Hampshire, England
- City of Portsmouth city council, New Hampshire, United States
- Boy Scout councils
  - Portsmouth Council, Virginia (historical)
  - Portsmouth Council, New Hampshire (historical)
  - Portsmouth Area Council, Virginia (historical)
