= Vaucluse (disambiguation) =

Vaucluse is a department in Southern France.

Vaucluse may also refer to:

== France ==
- Vaucluse, Doubs, a commune of the Doubs department
- Vaucluse Mountains, a mountain range of the French Prealps
- Vaucluse (monastery), a former charterhouse by the River Ain in Jura

== Australia ==
- Vaucluse, New South Wales, a suburb of the city of Sydney, Australia
- Electoral district of Vaucluse, a state district in Sydney
- Vaucluse (ferry), a ferry that ran between Circular Quay and Watsons Bay in Sydney
- Vaucluse House, in Sydney
- Vaucluse College, in Richmond, Victoria
- Vaucluse High School
- Vaucluse Public School

== United States ==
- Vaucluse, South Carolina, a town in Aiken County, United States
- Vaucluse, Virginia, a town in Frederick County, United States
- Vaucluse (Bridgetown, Virginia), a historic plantation house
- Vaucluse, Pleasants County, West Virginia
- Vaucluse (plantation), a plantation in Fairfax County, Virginia, United States

== Other ==
- Vaucluse (horse)
