= Green Spring, Virginia =

Green Spring refers to the following places in the U.S. state of Virginia:

- Green Spring Plantation in James City County
- Green Spring, Frederick County, Virginia
- Green Spring, Washington County, Virginia
- Green Spring, West Virginia (prior to West Virginia statehood in 1863)
