= John V. Tavenner =

American politician (died 1913)

Member of the Virginia House of Delegates from the Winchester and Frederick County district
- In office 1885–1887
- Preceded by: Robert T. Barton
- Succeeded by: John M. Silver

Personal details
- Born: John Valentine Tavenner Ohio, U.S.
- Died: January 16, 1913 (aged 75) Campostella Heights, Virginia, U.S.
- Resting place: Leesburg, Virginia, U.S.
- Party: Democratic
- Spouse: Margaret Ellis Thomas (m. 1865; died 1910)
- Children: 5
- Education: Union College
- Occupation: Politician; farmer; real estate businessman

John Valentine Tavenner (died January 16, 1913) was an American politician from Virginia. He served in the Virginia House of Delegates from 1885 to 1887.

== Early life ==
John Valentine Tavenner was born in Ohio to Pleasants (née Percell) and Stacey Tavenner. At the age of one, he moved to Frederick County, Virginia. He attended Union College in 1861, but left the same year to serve in the Confederate States Army during the Civil War. He later graduated in 1864.

== Career ==
Tavenner worked as a farmer in Frederick County. He was a Democrat. He served in the Virginia House of Delegates, representing Winchester and Frederick County, from 1885 to 1887. He later moved to Loudoun County.

Following his political career, Tavenner worked in the real estate business. He worked in Roanoke and moved to Berkley in 1900. He started a real estate business with L. Berkley and later formed the firm Tavenner & Keister. He later retired and Z. E. Keister purchased his interest in the firm.

== Personal life ==
Tavenner married Margaret Ellis Thomas, daughter of Martha and James Thomas, of Loudoun County on December 6, 1865. They had five children, Lula, Marie Rebecca, Mrs. H. C. Beall, Emma Belle and Mrs. S. M. Birdsong. His wife died in 1910. They lived in Leesburg. After living in Berkley, the family moved to Campostella Heights. He was an elder of Armstrong Memorial Presbyterian Church.

Tavenner died on January 16, 1913, aged 75, at his home in Arlington Avenue in Campostella Heights. He was buried in Leesburg.
