= White Hall, Frederick County, Virginia =

Unincorporated community in Virginia, United States

- Unincorporated community
- Location within Virginia Location within the United States
- Coordinates: 39°17′28″N 78°8′53″W
- Country: United States
- State: Virginia
- County: Frederick
- Time zone: UTC−5 (Eastern (EST))
  - Summer (DST): UTC−4 (EDT)
- GNIS feature ID: 1477872

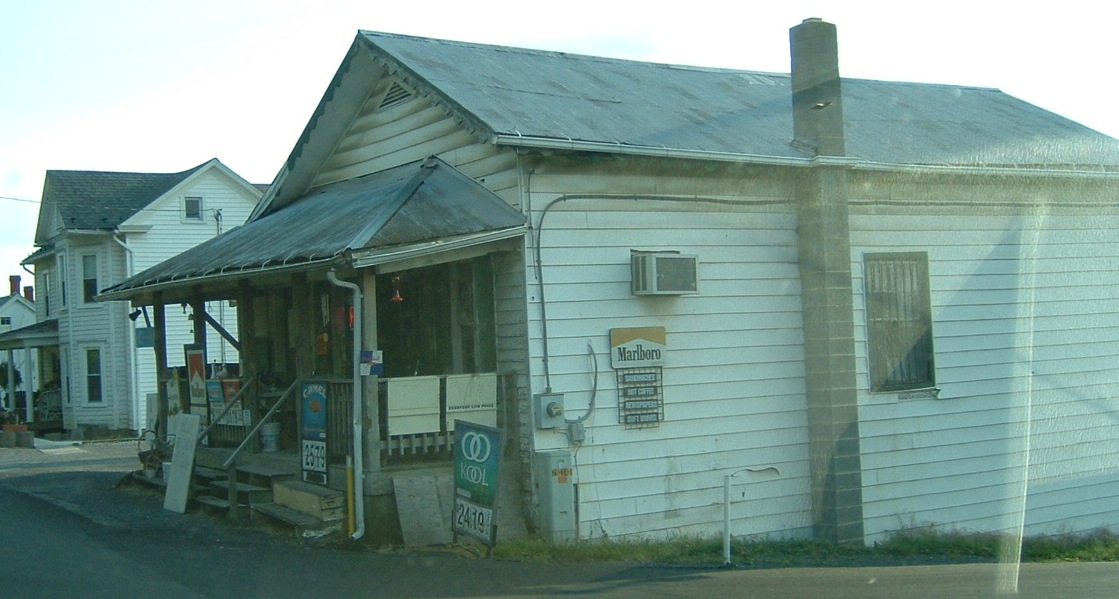
Downtown White Hall, Virginia White Hall Grocery Store

White Hall is an unincorporated farming community in northern Frederick County, Virginia, United States, established in the late 1810s and located near the crossroads of Apple Pie Ridge Road (VA 739) with Green Spring and White Hall (VA 671) Roads, astride Apple Pie Ridge (922 feet/281 meters).

== Geography ==
Apple Pie Ridge Road runs 8.8 miles along the key local terrain feature, which is the Apple Pie Ridge located between the city of Winchester and the West Virginia border, starting at U.S. 522 beside James Wood High School. The road passes the Upper Ridge Quaker Cemetery, then continues past Hiatt's Hill and Hiatt Road, where Edward Braddock led a march of British forces past this area on the way to capture Fort Duquesne near Pittsburgh, Pennsylvania.

The center of the White Hall community is marked by the White Hall Grocery store at the VA 739 and VA 671 intersection. Nearby is the White Hall United Methodist Church, the old White Hall School, the Crumley-Lynn-Lodge House (c. 1759) and the historical sites of an old blacksmith shop, cider mill, tavern and the Lower Quaker Meeting House. Bracketing the White Hall community are many of the prime apple orchard farms of Frederick County.

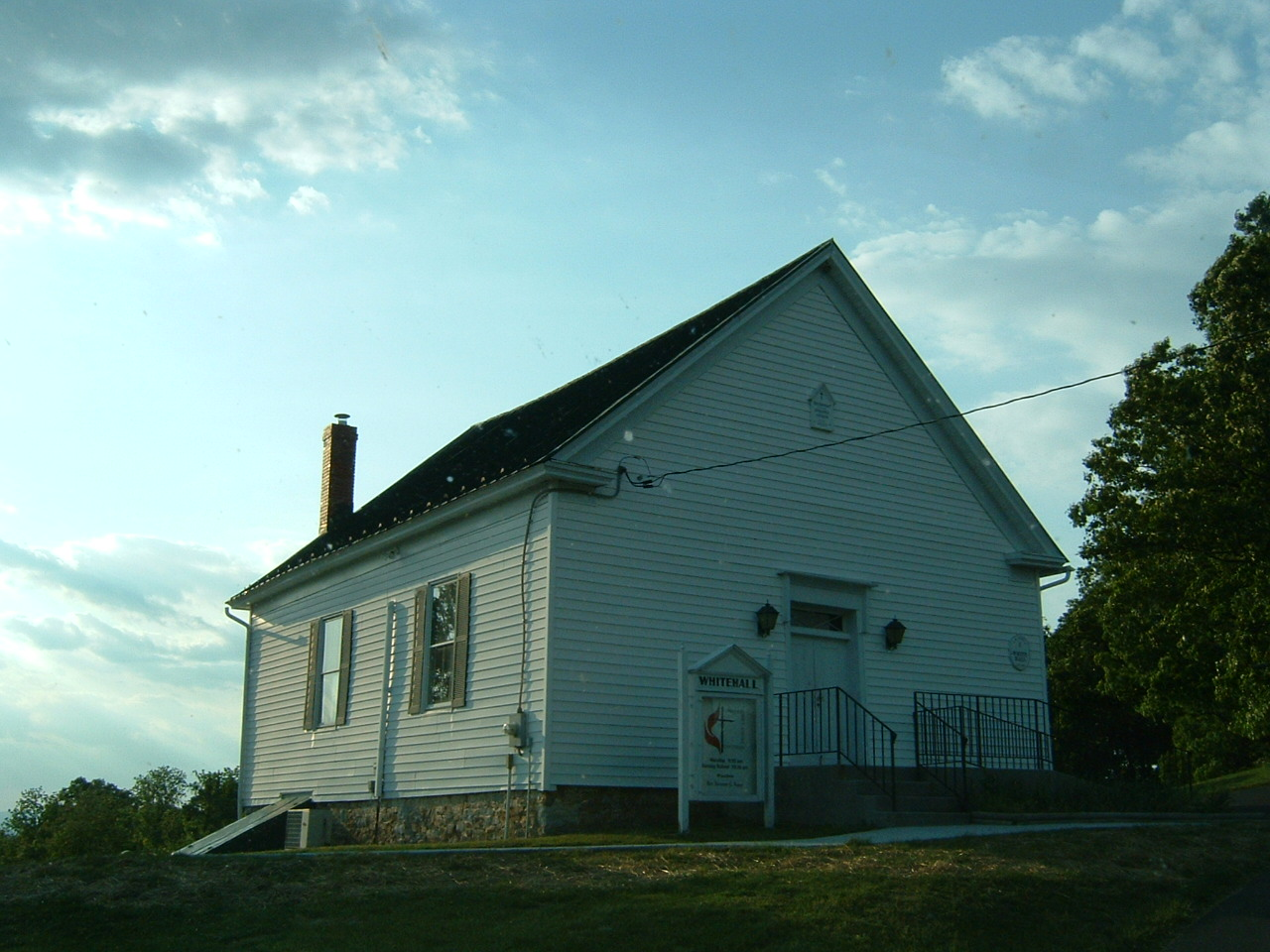
White Hall United Methodist Church

== Colonial history ==
The history of this community goes back to 1751, when the road was simply known as Ridge Road by an order of the court. As Quaker families settled in this area, migrating southward "up" the Great Appalachian Valley, orchards, wheat farms and cattle farms sprang up around the area. The road supposedly became known as Apple Pie Ridge Road when Hessian soldiers, captured during the American Revolutionary War, were quartered on the Glaize farm west of Winchester, Virginia, and would walk north to the ridge to eat apple pies cooked by Quakers.

In Varle's 1809 map of Frederick County the Apple Pie Ridge Road is shown with its new name, and many subsequent maps distinctly mark the White Hall intersection as a landmark. The Quaker meeting in this community was named the Hopewell Meeting, which was the name of three Quaker meetings in the local area, along Apple Pie Ridge and at Pugh's town (Gainesboro, Virginia) as well as on Crooked Run (east of Stephens City). Several historical schools stood along this road, including the Lower Ridge Quaker School, Ridge School, Barrett School, the White Hall School and two private schools in White Hall, including Lodge School.

== Civil War history ==
The White Hall community played a role in the various American Civil War battles surrounding Winchester, and wounded soldiers were treated in the White Hall United Methodist Church. Union forces were completely routed twice in two major defeats which sent disintegrated Union units fleeing to the north and west of Winchester through this area, particularly after the Second Battle of Winchester, when roads to Martinsburg, West Virginia were cut off by advancing Confederate troops on their way to Gettysburg, Pennsylvania in June 1863. Many partisan and Virginia Militia cavalry forces were sourced and operated in this area as part of the Confederate strategy to threaten and sever the Baltimore and Ohio Railroad, the Chesapeake and Ohio Canal and accompanying roads and telegraph lines north of here. Throughout the war, the White Hall community helped the Confederate States Army through provision of fodder, wheat, and cattle.

== Recent ==
Apple Pie Meadows Community at White Hall

Today new housing communities have sprung up near White Hall along Apple Pie Ridge, and are interspersed with old cattle farms and apple orchards with some farm houses still standing from the mid-18th century. The White Hall community offers scenic views of Green Spring and Frog Hollow in the foothills of the North Mountain to the west, as well as views of the greater Shenandoah Valley to the east.

The Old Stone Church was listed on the National Register of Historic Places in 2001, and the Crumley-Lynn-Lodge House was listed on the National Register of Historic Places in 2006.

== Notable people ==
- Gray Silver (1870–1935), West Virginia state senator and founder of the American Farm Bureau Federation

== Sources ==
- Hopewell Friends History, 1734-1934, Frederick County, Virginia: Records of Hopewell Monthly Meetings and Meetings Reporting to Hopewell; Two Hundred Years of History and Genealogy compiled from official records and published by a Joint Committee of Hopewell Friends, assisted by John W. Wayland. Baltimore, MD: Genealogical Publishing Co., 1975. 671 pp. Reprint of the 1936 ed.
