= Rock Enon Springs, Virginia =

Unincorporated community in Virginia, United States

- Unincorporated community
- Location within Virginia Location within the United States
- Coordinates: 39°12′43″N 78°23′11″W
- Country: United States
- State: Virginia
- County: Frederick
- Time zone: UTC−5 (Eastern (EST))
  - Summer (DST): UTC−4 (EDT)
- GNIS feature ID: 1493499

Rock Enon Springs is an unincorporated community in Frederick County, Virginia. United States. Rock Enon Springs is located 18 miles west of Winchester on Rock Enon Springs Road (VA 683) off Back Creek Road (VA 704) south of Gore. The community was known for its Rock Enon Springs Resort, which was sold in 1945 and is now owned by the Boy Scouts as Camp Rock Enon. Rock Enon Springs had a station along the Winchester and Western Railroad until the 1930s, when the railroad was shortened to Gore.

== Rock Enon Springs Resort ==
Rock Enon Springs Resort was built up around a mineral water spring and was originally called Capper Springs after an early settler, John Capper. In 1856, William Marker bought the property and built a hotel to accommodate guests at the springs. The resort contained six types of springs on the 942 acres (381 hectares) of property. During the mid 19th century, it became very popular as a place for people to heal various ailments by soaking in the spring's "medicine" waters. The resort survived the American Civil War and continued to draw Virginia's elite. In 1917 the Winchester and Western Railroad connected Rock Enon Springs with Winchester, moving both vacationers and supplies with far greater speed. It changed owners several times until, in 1919, it was purchased by Fred Glaize, Sr. and Lee Herrellin who tore down several buildings and the original wing of the hotel. The resort continued to lose business until 1944 when the Glaize Family sold the resort to the Shenandoah Area Council, Boy Scouts of America who now use it as their year-round camp, Camp Rock Enon.
