= Whitacre, Virginia =

Unincorporated community in Virginia, United States

- Unincorporated community
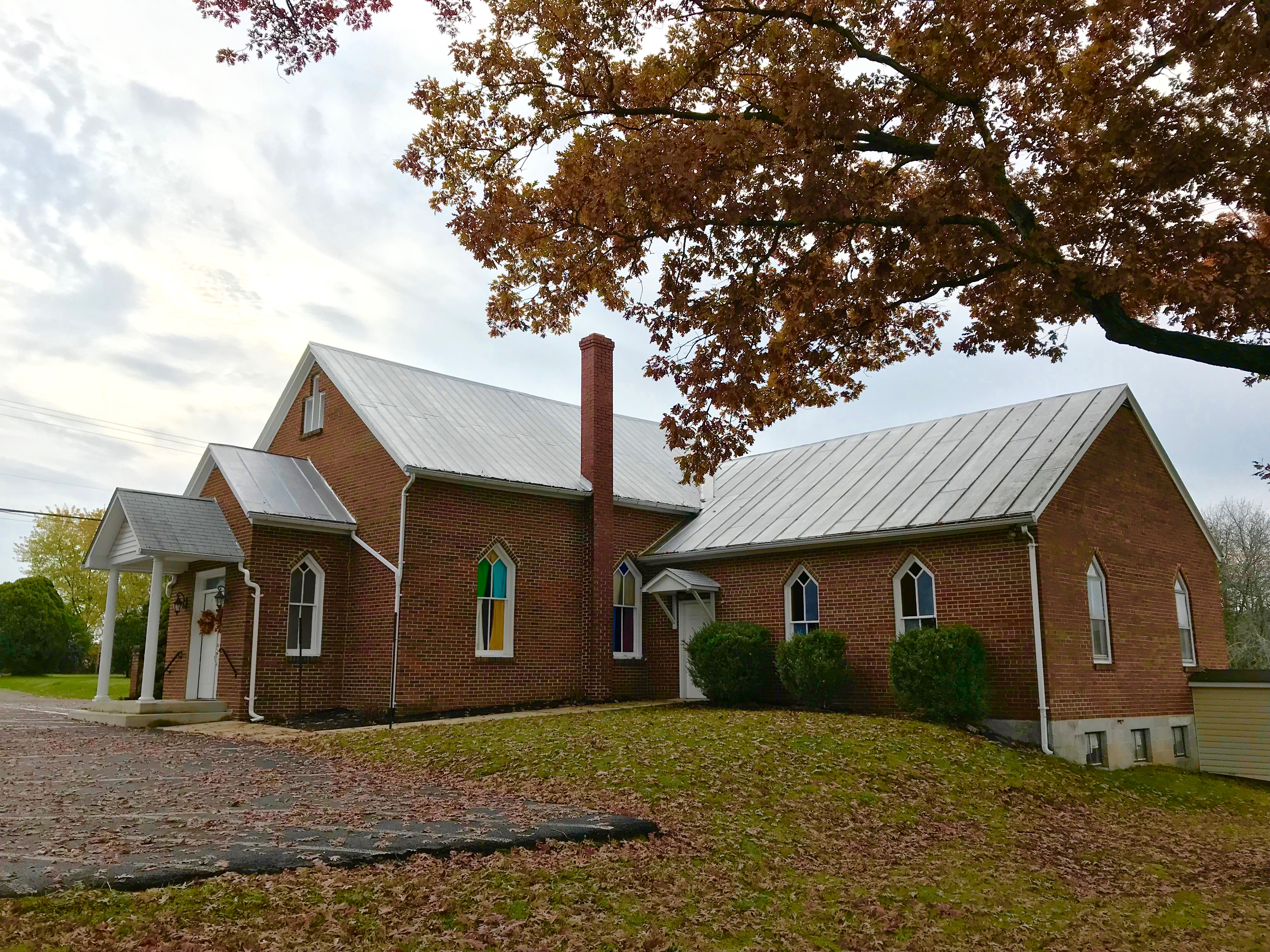
- New Hope Baptist Church (formerly Redland Church), 2017

- Location within Virginia Location within the United States
- Coordinates: 39°19′56″N 78°19′38″W
- Country: United States
- State: Virginia
- County: Frederick
- Time zone: UTC−5 (Eastern (EST))
  - Summer (DST): UTC−4 (EDT)
- GNIS feature ID: 1477871

Whitacre is an unincorporated community in northern Frederick County, Virginia, United States. Whitacre lies on the old Braddock Road on the eastern flanks of Timber Ridge between Good and Cross Junction. Whitacre is located north of Lake Holiday. The community takes its name from the Whitacre family that owned land in its vicinity.

== Historic sites ==
- Redland Church
