= Burnt Factory =

Burnt Factory may refer to:

- Burnt Factory, Virginia, an unincorporated community in Frederick County
- Burnt Factory, West Virginia, an unincorporated community in Morgan County
