= Lake Frederick, Virginia =

Coordinates: 39°02′35″N 78°09′42″W

Lake Frederick is an unincorporated community located in Frederick County, Virginia. The primary geographic feature is a 117 acres (47 ha) lake impoundment owned by the Virginia Department of Game and Inland Fisheries. Shea Homes, Ryan Homes, and Van Metre Homes have constructed communities along the lakeside.
