= Grimes, Virginia =

Unincorporated community in Virginia, United States

- Unincorporated community
- Location within Virginia Location within the United States
- Coordinates: 39°16′41″N 78°7′34″W
- Country: United States
- State: Virginia
- County: Frederick
- Time zone: UTC−5 (Eastern (EST))
  - Summer (DST): UTC−4 (EDT)
- GNIS feature ID: 1499505

Grimes is an unincorporated community in northern Frederick County, Virginia, United States. Grimes lies to the west of Cedar Hill on Welltown Road (VA 661).
