= Mount Williams, Virginia =

Unincorporated community in Virginia, United States

- Unincorporated community
- Location within Virginia Location within the United States
- Coordinates: 39°9′7″N 78°19′58″W
- Country: United States
- State: Virginia
- County: Frederick
- Time zone: UTC−5 (Eastern (EST))
  - Summer (DST): UTC−4 (EDT)
- GNIS feature ID: 1495978

Mount Williams is an unincorporated community in Frederick County, Virginia, United States. Mount Williams is located on Wardensville Grade (VA 608) to the southwest of Mount Pleasant. It was also known as Lookout.
