= Canterburg, Virginia =

Unincorporated community in Virginia, United States

- Unincorporated community
- Location within Virginia Location within the United States
- Coordinates: 39°2′48″N 78°11′3″W
- Country: United States
- State: Virginia
- County: Frederick
- Elevation: 692 ft (211 m)
- Time zone: UTC−5 (Eastern (EST))
  - Summer (DST): UTC−4 (EDT)
- GNIS feature ID: 1779205

Canterburg is an unincorporated community in eastern Frederick County, Virginia, United States.
