= Old Stone Church (White Hall, Virginia) =

Historic church in Virginia, United States

- U.S. National Register of Historic Places
- Virginia Landmarks Register
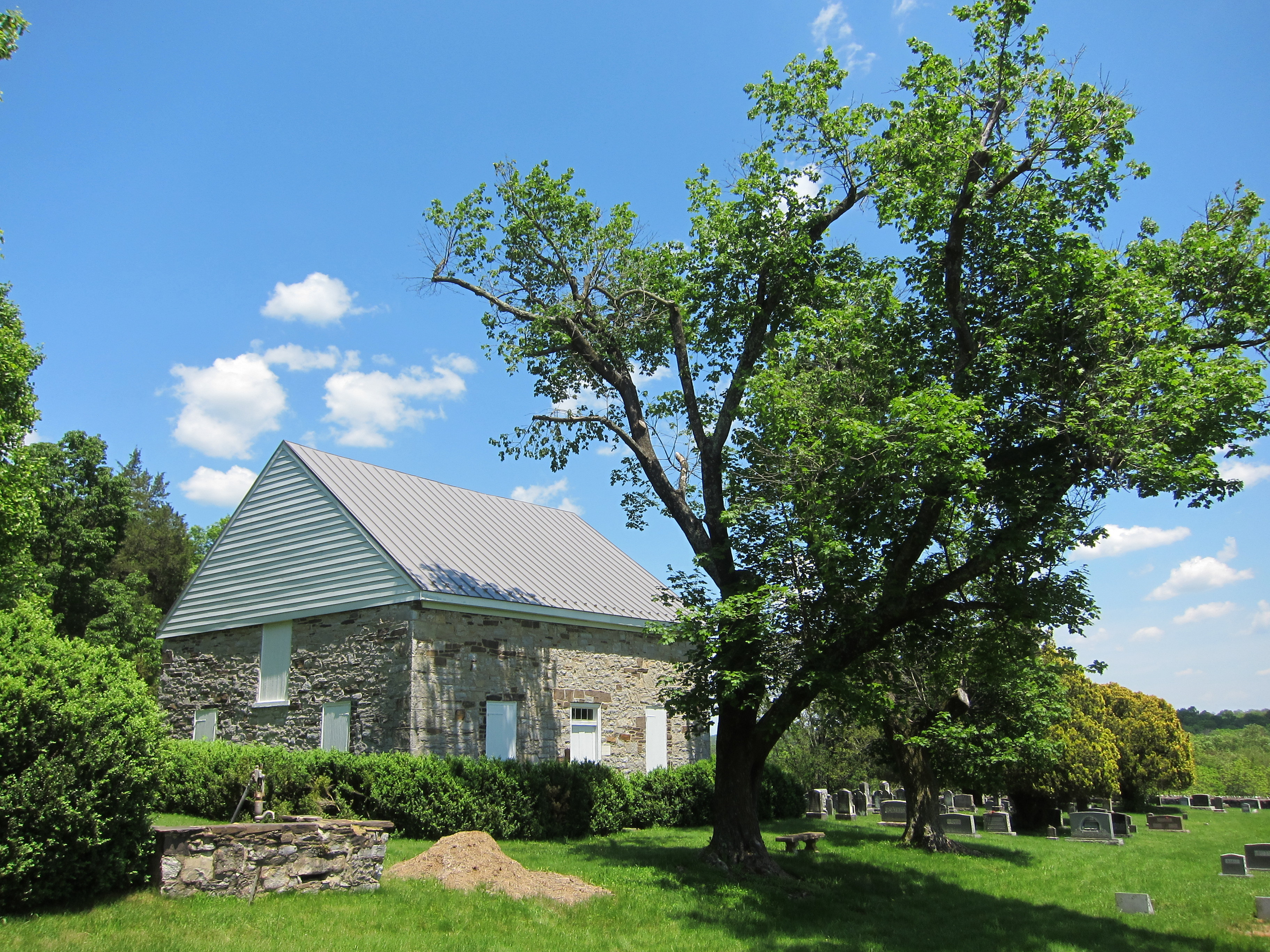
- Old Stone Church in 2016

- Location within Virginia Location within the United States
- Location: Approx. 1 mi. W of jct. of VA 671 and VA 739, White Hall, Virginia
- Coordinates: 39°18′4″N 78°10′5″W
- Area: 3.1 acres (1.3 ha)
- Built: 1820
- Architectural style: Early Republic
- NRHP reference No.: 01000689
- VLR No.: 034-0023

Significant dates
- Added to NRHP: July 5, 2001
- Designated VLR: December 6, 2000

Old Stone Church, also known as Green Spring Church and Stone Church, is a historic Lutheran church located at White Hall, Frederick County, Virginia. It was built about 1820, and rebuilt in 1838 after a fire. It is a one-story, gable-roofed, cut stone church. Also on the property is a contributing cemetery with many headstones dating from the early to mid-19th century and two stone gate pillars. It is the second oldest stone church surviving in Frederick County.

It was listed on the National Register of Historic Places in 2001.

== See also ==
- National Register of Historic Places listings in Frederick County, Virginia
