= Gray Silver =

American politician (1870–1935)

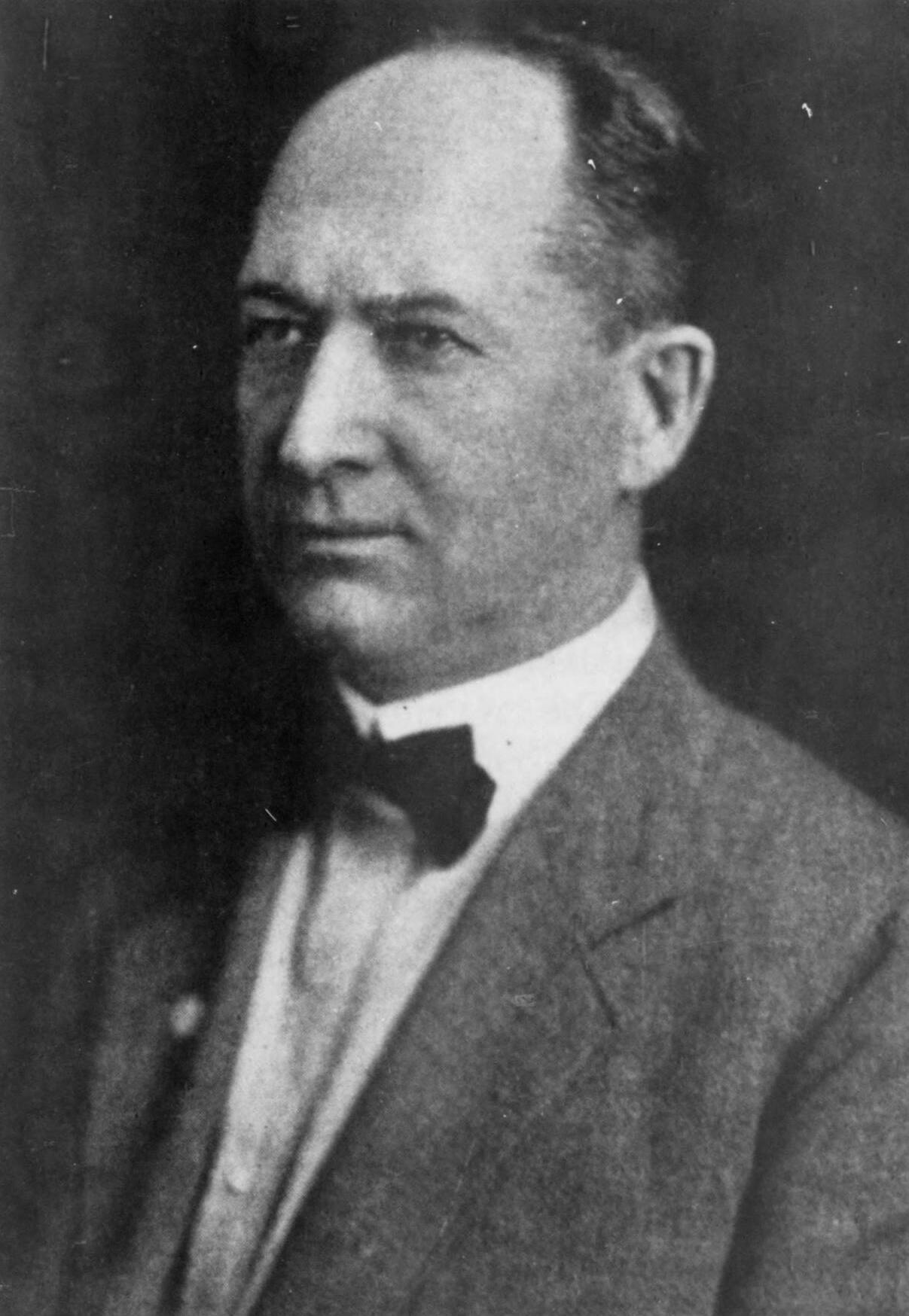
- Silver in a 1925 publication

Member of the West Virginia Senate from the 15th district
- In office 1907–1914 Serving with William Campbell

Personal details
- Born: February 17, 1870 White Hall, Frederick County, Virginia, U.S.
- Died: July 27, 1935 (aged 65) Martinsburg, West Virginia, U.S.
- Party: Democratic
- Spouse: Kate Bishop (m. 1908)
- Relations: John M. Silver (uncle)
- Children: 5
- Occupation: Politician; farmer; businessman

Gray Silver (February 17, 1870 – July 27, 1935) was an American politician, farmer, and agricultural leader from West Virginia. He served as a member of the West Virginia Senate from 1907 to 1914. He was one of the founders of the American Farm Bureau Federation.

== Early life ==
Gray Silver was born on February 17, 1870, in White Hall, Frederick County, Virginia, to Mary Anne (née Gray) and Francis Silver III. His father was a veteran of the Confederate States Army. His father died at a young age.

== Career ==
Silver was a farmer and raised cattle. On December 16, 1903, his farm in Inwood, West Virginia, burned down.

Silver was a Democrat. He defeated W. E. Outcalt in November 1906 and served as a member of the West Virginia Senate, representing the 15th senatorial district. He served in the state senate until 1914. In the spring of 1907, he voted against a prohibition amendment to the West Virginia constitution stating that the amendment would "be immediat[e]" and would require "property, stock and plants of those engaged in any district in the business of selling or manufacturing intoxicants" to be confiscated. The Shepherdstown Register refuted his statements citing the amendment, if passed, would not take effect until July 1909. In September 1909, he was arrested and accused of poisoning dogs that had gone sick and died throughout Martinsburg. Witnesses stated they had seen him purchase poison prior to the deaths. The grand jury found there was not enough evidence to proceed. On August 3, 1913, he was appointed by Governor Henry D. Hatfield as the West Virginia representative to the Lincoln Highway project. He was an advocate for the Good Roads Movement in West Virginia and helped the state raise $50,000,000 in state bonds for an inter-county road system. He also helped broaden the scope of the College of Agriculture at the West Virginia University. In July 1914, the Democrats of his district nominated judge Frank Beckwith over him.

In 1912, Silver was president and manager of Applepie Ridge Orchards near Inwood. After his second term, he continued superintending his farm, developing his orchards, and breeding and selling livestock. In 1918, Silver was chairman of the war savings stamps committee and the liberty loan committee of Berkeley County. In November 1918, Howard Mason Gore and Silver represented the West Virginia Farm Bureau Federation at the formation of the American Farm Bureau Federation. From 1920 to 1924, he was the organization's legislative agent in Washington, D.C. During that period, the Federal Intermediate Credit Bank system was established and changes to individual loan regulations for farmland banks were made. In 1924, he became president of the United States Grain Marketing Corporation, a farming co-operative based in Chicago. In 1925, he returned to manage his orchard and farm in Martinsburg, West Virginia.

In 1928 and 1932, Silver was considered for the Democratic nomination for governor of West Virginia, but did not run. He planned to run for the U.S. senate in 1934, but his health prevented it. Democratic senator Matthew M. Neely publicly opposed the potential nomination of Silver, stating "I shall under no circumstances support the candidacy of Gray Silver, for reasons of which Mr. Silver himself is fully aware." Silver retorted in a newspaper, "I shall under no circumstances support the candidacy of M. M. Neely, for reasons of which Mr. Neely is fully aware."

Silver attended Democratic National Conventions for 28 years. He was one of eight West Virginia delegates elected for the 1932 Democratic National Convention. He also owned farmland in Oklahoma and Illinois.

== Personal life ==
Silver married Kate Bishop of Berkeley County on December 6, 1908. They had five children, Mrs. John Burnside, Gray Jr., Mrs. Nathaniel Boyd, Francis V, and Katharine DuBois. His uncle was sheriff and Virginia legislator John M. Silver.

Silver was a deacon of the Presbyterian Church in Martinsburg. He was a 32nd degree Mason and was a member of the Knights Templar, Elks, Sons and Daughter of Pilgrims, American Clan Gregor and the Sons of American Revolution. He was a member of the Rotary Club of Martinsburg. In 1913, he became a member of the Luther Burbank Society. In 1911, he lived on West Martin Street in Martinsburg. He lived on South Queens Street in Martinsburg. In 1914, he escaped an armed burglary at his home.

In May 1926, Silver was hospitalized for appendicitis. On October 11, 1929, he and his wife were struck by a train in an automobile near Williamsport, Maryland. Silver fractured his skull and his wife broke her leg. He died of heart disease on July 27, 1935, at his home in Martinsburg.

== Legacy ==
In 1911, Silver and Septimius Hall, both chairmen of the legislature's finance committees, had Silver Hall, a building of the Girls' Industrial Home in Salem, West Virginia, named in their honor.
