= Crumley–Lynn–Lodge House =

Historic house in Virginia, United States

- U.S. National Register of Historic Places
- Virginia Landmarks Register
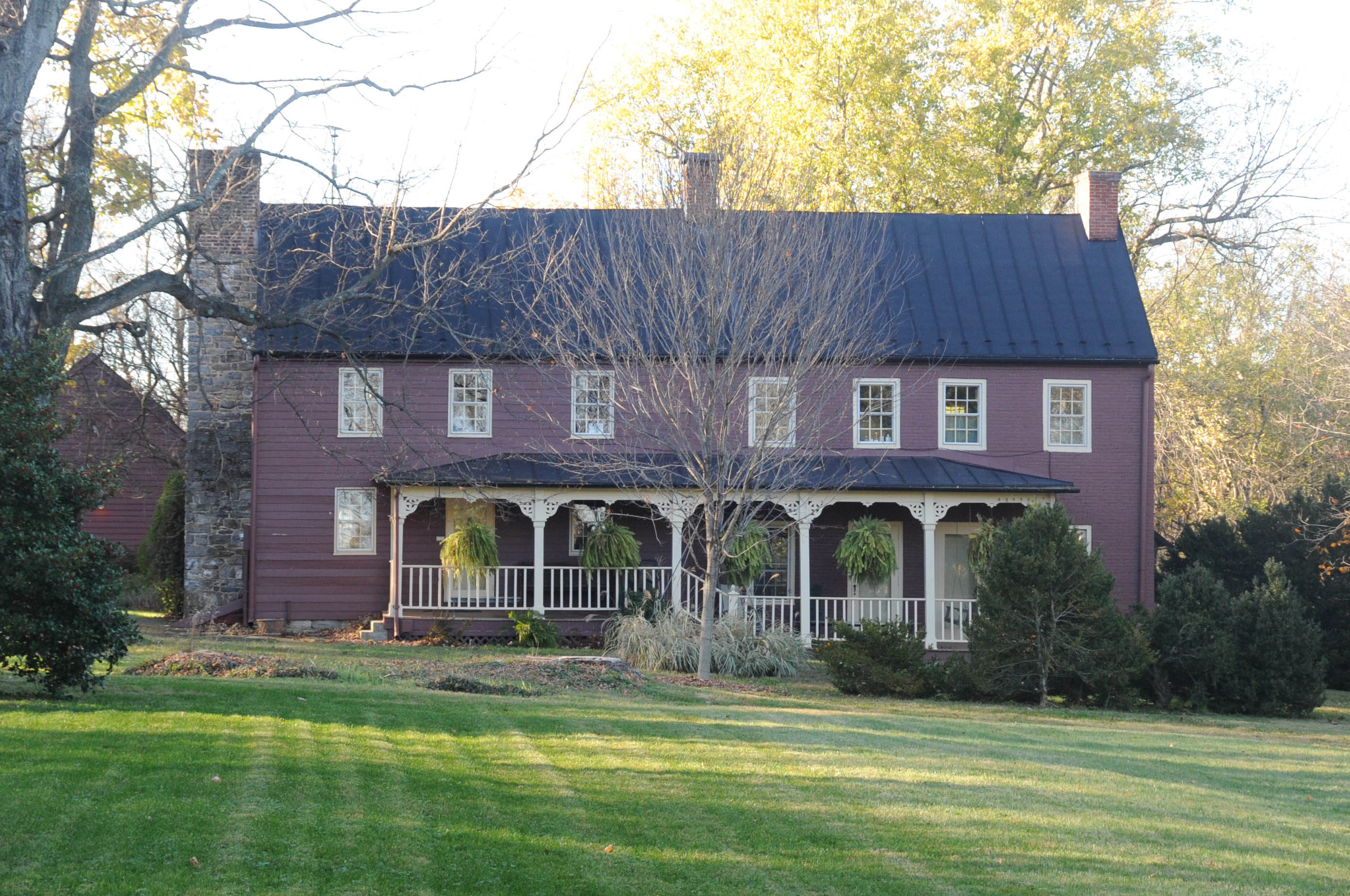

- Location within Virginia Location within the United States
- Location: 3641 Apple Pie Ridge Rd., near Winchester, Virginia
- Coordinates: 39°18′09.1″N 78°08′32.2″W
- Area: 5 acres (2.0 ha)
- Built: c. 1759, c. 1830, c. 1850
- Architectural style: Colonial, Federal
- NRHP reference No.: 06000806
- VLR No.: 034-0152

Significant dates
- Added to NRHP: September 6, 2006
- Designated VLR: June 8, 2006

Crumley–Lynn–Lodge House is a historic home located near Winchester, Frederick County, Virginia. The earliest section was built about 1759, and was a 1 1/2-story, log section raised to a full two stories about 1850. About 1830, a two-story, Federal style brick section was added. A two-story frame section was added to the original log section in 1987–1994. The front facade features a folk Victorian-style front porch with square columns, sawn brackets and pendants, and plain handrail and balusters. Also on the property are the contributing mid-19th-century brick granary, and log meat house, as well as a late-19th century corn crib, and the stone foundation of a barn.

It was listed on the National Register of Historic Places in 2006.

== See also ==
- National Register of Historic Places listings in Frederick County, Virginia
