= Frederick County Courthouse =

Historic courthouse in Virginia, US

- U.S. National Register of Historic Places
- Virginia Landmarks Register
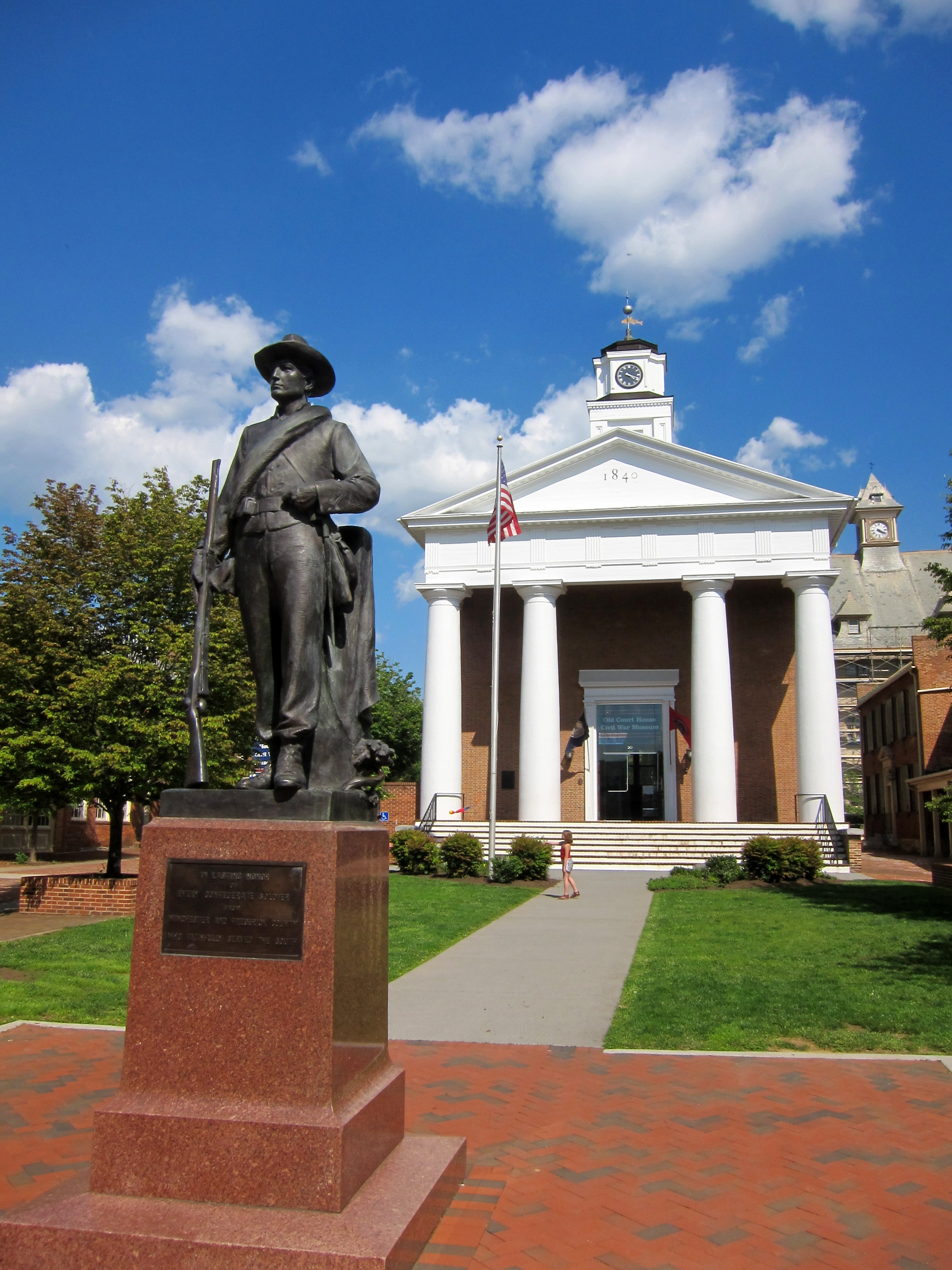
- Old Courthouse and Confederate monument, 2016

- Location within Virginia Location within the United States
- Interactive map showing the location of Frederick County Courthouse
- Location: 20 N. Loudoun St., Winchester, Virginia
- Coordinates: 39°11′2″N 78°9′52″W
- Area: less than one acre
- Built: 1840
- Architectural style: Greek Revival
- NRHP reference No.: 01000690
- VLR No.: 034-5062

Significant dates
- Added to NRHP: July 5, 2001
- Designated VLR: March 14, 2001

Frederick County Courthouse is a historic county courthouse located at Winchester, Frederick County, Virginia. It was built in 1840, and is a two-story, rectangular, brick building on a stone foundation and partial basement in the Greek Revival style. It measures 50 feet by 90 feet, and features a pedimented Doric order portico and a gabled roof surmounted by a cupola. Also on the property is a contributing Confederate monument, dedicated in 1916, consisting of a bronze statue of a soldier on a stone base.

The building currently houses the Shenandoah Valley Civil War Museum.

It was listed on the National Register of Historic Places in 2001. It is located in the Winchester Historic District.

== See also ==
- National Register of Historic Places listings in Frederick County, Virginia
