= Hogue Creek =

Stream in Virginia, United States

Coordinates: 39°15′40.67″N 78°14′40.4″W

Hogue Creek is a 17.3-mile-long (27.8 km) tributary stream of Back Creek in Frederick County, Virginia. Hogue Creek rises on Great North Mountain and flows into Back Creek at Graves Hill.

== Tributaries ==
Tributary streams are listed from headwaters to mouth.

- Bucher Run
- Indian Hollow Run

== List of communities along Hogue Creek ==
- Hayfield
- Indian Hollow
- McQuire

== See also ==
- List of Virginia rivers
