= Reynolds Store, Virginia =

Unincorporated community in Virginia, United States

- Unincorporated community
- Location within Virginia Location within the United States
- Coordinates: 39°22′59″N 78°17′56″W
- Country: United States
- State: Virginia
- County: Frederick
- Time zone: UTC−5 (Eastern (EST))
  - Summer (DST): UTC−4 (EDT)
- GNIS feature ID: 1473171

Reynolds Store is an unincorporated community in northern Frederick County, Virginia, United States. Reynolds Store is located along the North Frederick Pike (U.S. Route 522) at its crossroads with Cumberland Trail Road (VA 694) and Reynolds Road. The post office of neighboring Cross Junction serves the community.

== Historic sites ==
- Timber Ridge Church
- Wesley Chapel (Wesley United Methodist Church)
