= Cedar Grove, Frederick County, Virginia =

Unincorporated community in Virginia, United States

- Unincorporated community
- Location within Virginia Location within the United States
- Coordinates: 39°16′5″N 78°11′21″W
- Country: United States
- State: Virginia
- County: Frederick
- Time zone: UTC−5 (Eastern (EST))
  - Summer (DST): UTC−4 (EDT)
- GNIS feature ID: 1499227

Cedar Grove is an unincorporated community in Frederick County, Virginia, United States. Cedar Grove lies at the intersection of Cedar Grove, Saint Clair, and Old Baltimore Roads.
