= Shawnee Land, Virginia =

Shawneeland, Virginia
- Census-designated place
- Location within Virginia Location within the United States
- Coordinates: 39°11′29″N 78°20′44″W
- Country: United States
- State: Virginia
- County: Frederick

Area
  - Total: 7.39 sq mi (19.15 km^{2})
  - Land: 7.36 sq mi (19.06 km^{2})
  - Water: 0.035 sq mi (0.09 km^{2})

Population (2010)
  - Total: 1,873
  - Density: 255/sq mi (98.3/km^{2})
- Time zone: UTC−5 (Eastern (EST))
  - Summer (DST): UTC−4 (EDT)
- ZIP code: 22602
- FIPS code: 51-71625
- GNIS feature ID: 2630782

Shawnee Land is a residential community in Frederick County, Virginia, United States. Shawnee Land is located on the eastern slopes of Great North Mountain. The U.S. Census Bureau defines it as a census-designated place (listed as Shawneeland), with a population of 1,873 as of 2010. In its past, Shawnee Land was a ski resort, with a number of slopes located on the eastern side of Great North Mountain. Shawnee Land thrived for a few years, but eventually the investors abandoned the project and the ski slopes were closed.

== Geography ==
The community is in western Frederick County, 10 miles (16 km) west of Winchester and 3 miles (5 km) east of the West Virginia border. The mountainside community rises from a base elevation of 850 feet (260 m) above sea level in the southeast, along Back Mountain Road, to the 2,300-foot (700 m) summit ridge of Great North Mountain in the northwest. The community drains east to the valley of Hogue Creek, which flows northeast to join Back Creek, a tributary of the Potomac River.

According to the U.S. Census Bureau, the Shawneeland CDP has a total area of 7.4 square miles (19.1 km^{2}), of which 0.04 square miles (0.1 km^{2}), or 0.48%, are water.

== Demographics ==
Historical population
Census	Pop.	Note	%±
2010	1,873		—
2020	2,248		20.0%
U.S. Decennial Census; 2010 2020

Shawneeland was first listed as a census designated place in the 2010 U.S. census.
