= Rest, Virginia =

Unincorporated community in Virginia, United States

- Unincorporated community
- Location within Virginia Location within the United States
- Coordinates: 39°17′25″N 78°4′58″W
- Country: United States
- State: Virginia
- County: Frederick
- Time zone: UTC−5 (Eastern (EST))
  - Summer (DST): UTC−4 (EDT)
- GNIS feature ID: 1496140

Rest is an unincorporated community in northern Frederick County, Virginia, United States. Rest is located along U.S. Route 11 south of the West Virginia state line with Berkeley County. The community of Ridgeway lies to its north.
