= Tidewater Council =

Scouting America council near Virginia Beach

Tidewater Council (#596)
- Owner: Scouting America
- Headquarters: Virginia Beach, Virginia
- Country: United States
- Founded: 1911
- Website http://www.tidewaterbsa.com/

Tidewater Council is a local council of Scouting America. It serves southeastern Virginia and northeastern North Carolina, a region often referred to as South Hampton Roads or the Tidewater area. The council’s Order of the Arrow counterpart is the Blue Heron Lodge, which was founded in 1946 when a team from Octoraro Lodge in Pennsylvania inducted the first members of Blue Heron Lodge.

== Organization ==
Tidewater Council is divided into four districts:

District	Area served
Bayside	All areas of Virginia Beach north of I-264, and Norfolk excluding Southside Norfolk
Princess Anne	All areas of Virginia Beach lying south of I-264 and Knotts Island, NC
Three Rivers	All of Chesapeake, Portsmouth and Southside Norfolk
Albemarle	Gates, Chowan, Perquimans, Perquimans, Pasquotank, Dare and Currituck (less Knotts Island) Counties, North Carolina

== History ==
The Tidewater Council was founded in 1911 as the Norfolk Council, changing its name in 1935 to its current name. In 1916, the Portsmouth Council (#597) was founded, changing its name to the Portsmouth Area Council in 1924. Portsmouth merged with the Norfolk Council in 1930.

In 2025, highlights:

- Direct support of 5,106 youth and 1,783 adults.
- Sale of $1.2 million in retail sales, including more than $118,000 in donations to our military men and women and returning $473,000 to Scouts units to support their program.
- More than $250,000 from grants and foundations.
- Tidewater Council Scouts earned 17,041 adventure loops, and 6,013 merit badges during 2025, introducing youth to a wide range of hobbies, careers, and life skills.
- 233 Scouts earned the Arrow of Light, the highest rank in Cub Scouting.
- 119 Scouts earned the highest rank of Eagle Scout.
- 17 ScoutReach programs benefitting over 300 youth, offering opportunities to the most vulnerable members of our community, funded by donors like you.
- Tidewater Council Scouts recorded 51,000 service hours, contributing a value of $1.7 million to the community.

Among its special fundraising events are the Leadership Breakfast, Examples of Success dinner, Darden Gala.

Tidewater Council has three known Distinguished Eagle Scouts: Channing Zucker, Ad. Chuck Kubic, and John Scheib.

== Pipsico Scout Reservation ==
Pipsico Scout Reservation
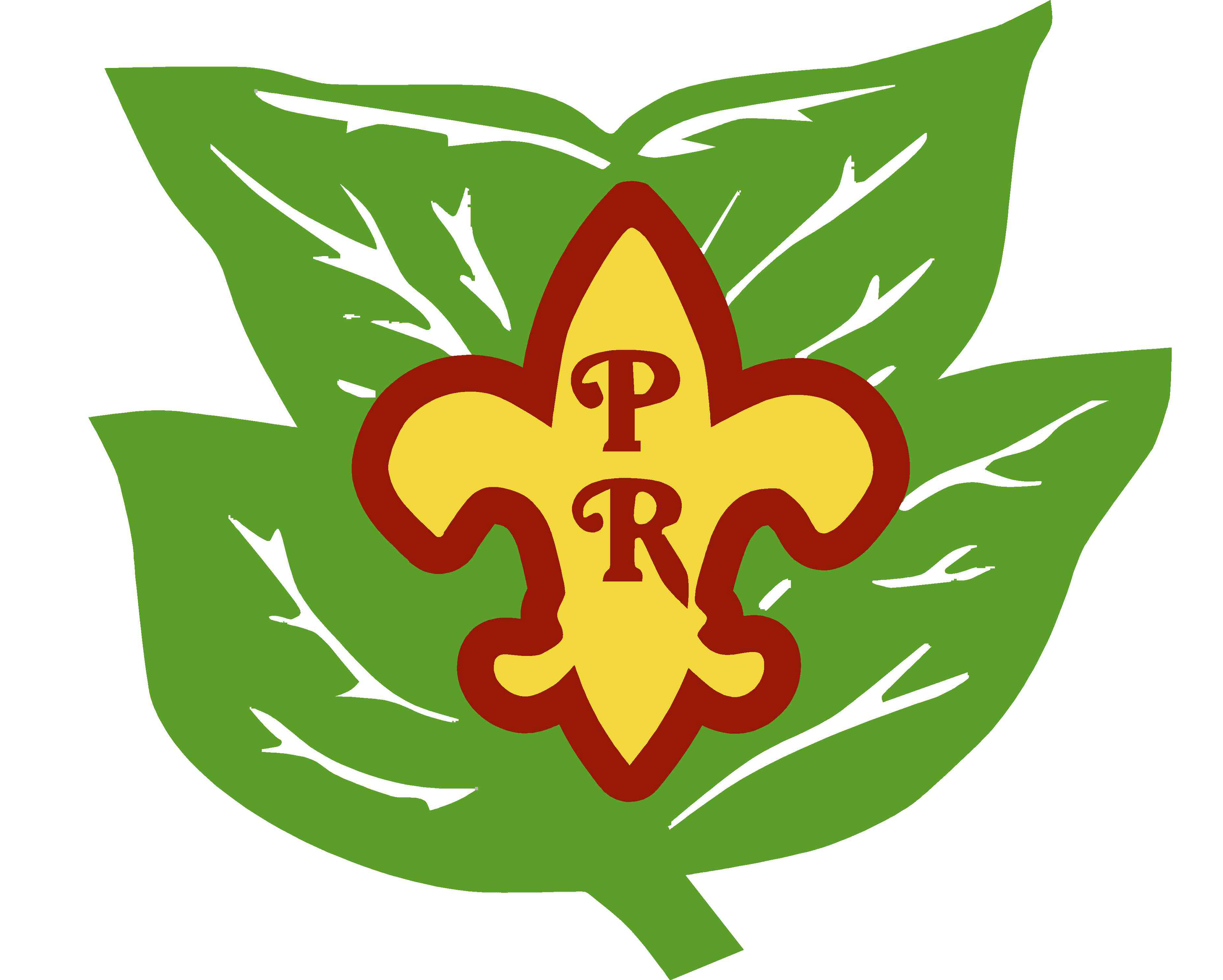
- Owner: Tidewater Council
- Location: Spring Grove, VA
- Founded: 1958
- Website http://www.pipsicobsa.com

Pipsico Scout Reservation is located in Surry County, Virginia between Surry and Spring Grove on the banks of the James River. Pipsico is subdivided into four camps: Camp Lions, Camp Kiwanis, Camp Rotary and Camp Powhatan.. It is owned by a trust with three trustees.

Pipsico offers year-round Scouting opportunities in one of our four Scout camps as well as a summer camp and high adventure experience during the summer. Summer camp activities include: Scoutcraft, climbing and rappelling tower, shooting sports, aquatics, hiking trails, a 17th-century archaeological dig site and handicrafts. In October 2008, Pipsico celebrated its 50th anniversary and included staff members from 1958 to 2008 as part of the celebration.

The James River Adventure Base at Pipsico Scout Reservation programs include a week-long scuba diving program, a week-long sailing program, and the ultimate experience of a week-long adventure program called PEX.

== Order of the Arrow ==
Blue Heron Lodge
- Totem: Blue Heron
- Owner: Tidewater Council
- Founded: 1946
- Website https://www.blueheronlodge.org/

Blue Heron Lodge 349 is the local chapter of the Order of the Arrow affiliated with Tidewater Council. In 1946, the council formed an Order of the Arrow lodge when ceremonialists from Octoraro Lodge 22 inducted the first members. In 1947, the totem of a blue heron was selected and the lodge was named Blue Heron Lodge 349.

On October 1st, 2024, Blue Heron Lodge transitioned from the traditional Lodge Chief leadership model to a new Council of Chiefs model. In this new model, the chiefs from each of the lodge's six chapters have equal powers and responsibilities. The Council of Chiefs retain their chapter advisors but also have three Council of Chief Advisor's which replaced the traditional Lodge advisor position.

Blue Heron Lodge provides service and support to Pipsico Scout Reservation during three weekends each year and also hosts events such as Fall Fellowship and the Holiday Banquet.

== See also ==
- Scouting in Virginia
