= Nain, Virginia =

Unincorporated community in Virginia, United States

- Unincorporated community
- Location within Virginia Location within the United States
- Coordinates: 39°14′21″N 78°11′59″W
- Country: United States
- State: Virginia
- County: Frederick
- Time zone: UTC−5 (Eastern (EST))
  - Summer (DST): UTC−4 (EDT)
- GNIS feature ID: 1499785

Nain is an unincorporated community in Frederick County, Virginia, United States. Nain is located northwest of Winchester along the North Frederick Pike (U.S. Highway 522). The community is situated within a gap in Little North Mountain and Flint Ridge.
