= Parkins Mills, Virginia =

Unincorporated community in Virginia, United States

- Unincorporated community
- Location within Virginia Location within the United States
- Coordinates: 39°6′25″N 78°9′25″W
- Country: United States
- State: Virginia
- County: Frederick
- Time zone: UTC−5 (Eastern (EST))
  - Summer (DST): UTC−4 (EDT)
- GNIS feature ID: 1499842

Parkins Mills is an unincorporated community in Frederick County, Virginia, United States. Parkins Mills lies southeast of Winchester on the Front Royal Pike (U.S. Route 522) at Opequon Creek.

== Historic Landmarks ==
Parkins Mill Battery- Used During the Civil War to defend Winchester and Opequon Creek, located on the hill overlooking Front Royal Pike and West Parkins Mill Road, on Fort Hill Farm property
