= Marlboro, Virginia =

Unincorporated community in Virginia, United States

- Unincorporated community
- Location within Virginia Location within the United States
- Coordinates: 39°4′53″N 78°19′20″W
- Country: United States
- State: Virginia
- County: Frederick
- Time zone: UTC−5 (Eastern (EST))
  - Summer (DST): UTC−4 (EDT)
- GNIS feature ID: 1495901

Marlboro is an unincorporated community in Frederick County, Virginia, United States. It is located at the intersection of Middle Road (VA 628) and Cedar Creek Grade (VA 622) on Cedar Creek. Marlboro was originally known as Marlborough and Marlboroughtown.
