= Scouting in Virginia =

Scouting in Virginia has a long history, from the 1910s to the present day, serving thousands of youth in programs that suit the environment in which they live. Many of the local groups and districts took names of historic Virginia Indian tribes in the state.

== Scouting America ==
=== History ===
William D. Boyce incorporated the Boy Scouts of America at 11:03 am on February 8, 1910, in Washington, D.C., on the advice of railroad executive and later first national president of the organization Colin H. Livingstone, with assistance from lawyers at the firm Ralston, Siddons and Richardson. Six months later (Note: August 1910) in Norfolk, Charles Merrill Watson, pastor of First Christian Church, organized Troop 1, the first Boy Scout troop in Virginia.

In the next year the National Capital Area Council was formed. The oldest unit in the council is Troop 52, out of All Saints Episcopal Church in Chevy Chase. This unit dates all the way back to 1913. When the Metropolitan Police Department of the District of Columbia decided that the security of suffrage marchers in 1916 was not their problem, Troop 52 Scouts marched alongside the women.

From 1981 National Scout Jamboree, through the 2010 National Scout Jamboree, all Jamborees were held at Fort A.P. Hill, Virginia.

=== Blue Ridge Mountains Council ===
The Blue Ridge Mountains Council (BRMC) serves Scouts in southwest and south central Virginia. The Council owns and operates the Blue Ridge Scout Reservation in Pulaski County, Virginia, the largest Council-owned Scout reservation in the United States, which hosts summer camps at Camp Powhatan and Camp Ottari.

=== Buckskin Council ===
Buckskin Council serves Scouts in Scouts in Kentucky, Ohio, Virginia and West Virginia.

=== Colonial Virginia Council ===
Formed by the merger of the Peninsula Council (Formerly Newport News Council) and the Old Dominion Council in 1996. Served by the Wahunsenakah Lodge of the Order of the Arrow.

- Chesapeake Bay District – City of Poquoson, and the Counties of York, Gloucester, and Mathews
- Colonial Trail District – City of Suffolk, and the Counties of Isle of Wight (excluding the southern portion), and Surry
- First Colony District – City of Williamsburg and James City County
- Monitor-Merrimac District – Cities of Hampton and Newport News
- Siouan Rivers District (named after the language spoken by historic Virginia Indian tribes in the Piedmont) – Cities of Emporia and Franklin, and the Counties of Brunswick, Greensville, Southampton, Sussex, and lower Isle of Wight

=== Del-Mar-Va Council ===
Del-Mar-Va Council serves Scouts in Delaware, Maryland and Northampton and Accomack Counties in Virginia.

=== Heart of Virginia Council ===
Founded in 1913, the Heart of Virginia Council, Boy Scouts of America, serves 1,400 youth in Central Virginia. The council offers training and support to units in 24 counties in the Tidewater and Piedmont regions of the state, an area spanning 8,143 square miles. Each district represents distinct Scouting communities that serve youth, families, and units within its region. Heart of Virginia Council boasts 604 beautiful acres of property in Maidens Virginia, known as the Heart of Virginia Council Scout Reservation.

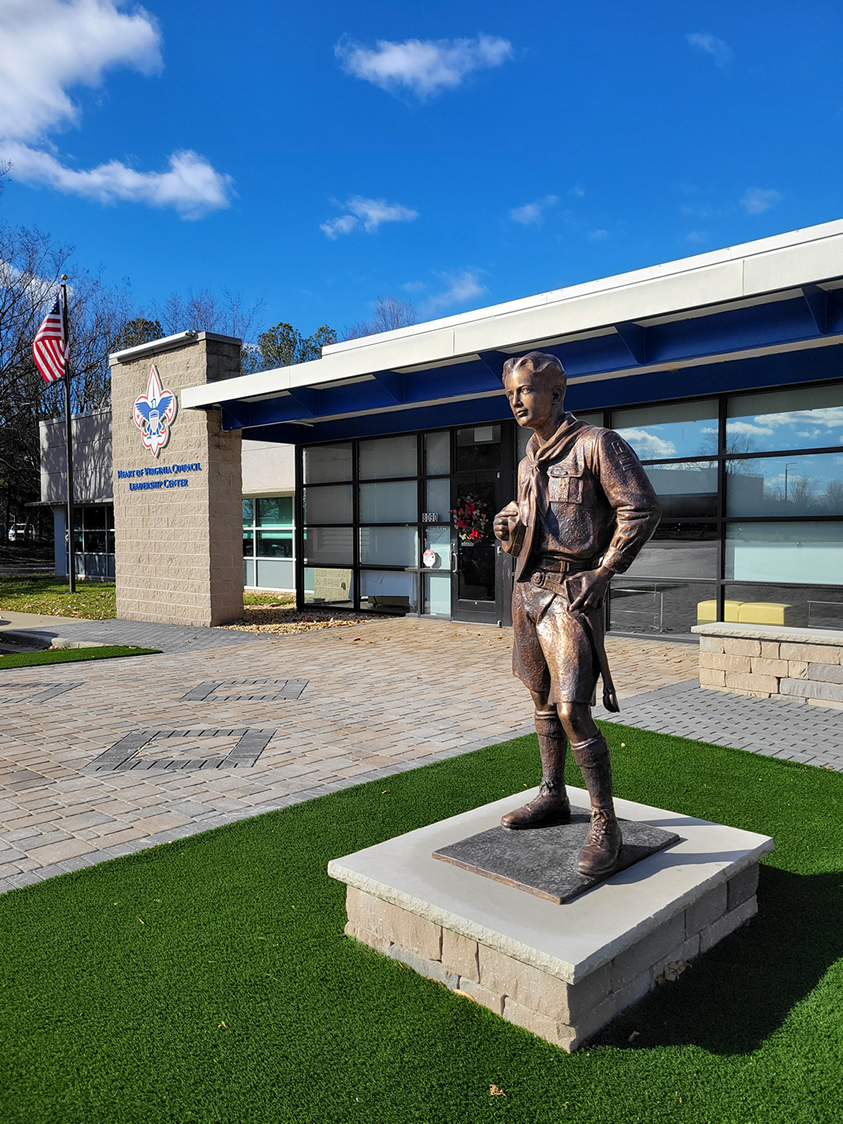
The Heart of Virginia Council Leadership Center in Henrico, Virginia, features the Dominion Energy Plaza, complete with a bronze "The Ideal Scout" statue.

==== Organization ====
Districts:

- Arrohattoc District
- Crater District
- Dogwood District
- Huguenot Trail District
- James River District

==== Camps ====
- Camp T. Brady Saunders - resident camp established in 1964 near Maidens, Goochland County, Virginia. Diverse program centered on adventure, leadership, and personal development with one of the finest STEM and outdoor leadership offerings in the region.
- Cub Adventure Camp - resident camp opened in 2002 near Maidens, Goochland County, Virginia. Offers year-round camping and outdoor programming which includes shooting sports, nature, swimming, aquatics, and camping.
- Camp S. Douglas Fleet - Short-term camping facility available for units to use during the off-season near Maidens, Goochland County, Virginia.
- Camp Eagle Point - 120 acre primitive camp located on Kerr Reservoir (Buggs Island Lake) in Mecklenburg County, Virginia, no potable water available. Leased from the Army Corps of Engineers.

=== National Capital Area Council ===
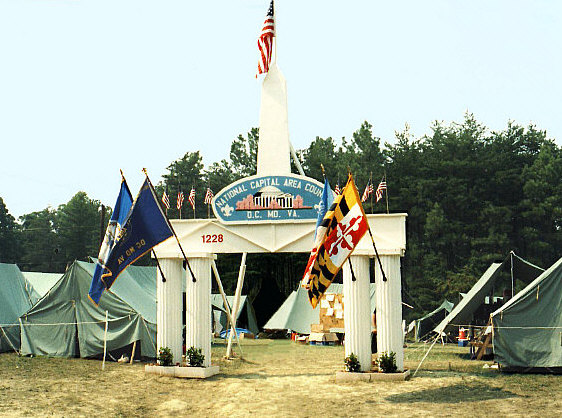
Council gateway during the 1993 National Scout Jamboree held at Fort A.P. Hill

The National Capital Area Council (NCAC) within the Northeast Region that serves Scouts in the Washington, D.C., Maryland, Virginia, and the United States Virgin Islands. The council offers extensive training, and administrative support to units. It is rated as a "Class 100" council by the National Council (headquarters office), which denotes that the NCAC is among the very largest in the country. Chartered in 1911, it is also one of the oldest. The council is divided into 23 districts serving ten counties in Northern Virginia, six counties in Maryland, the District of Columbia, and the US Virgin Islands. The council has a 2.5 to 1 ratio of youth members to adult leaders, which is among the highest of all the councils. The youth retention rate approaches 80%.

=== Sequoyah Council ===
Sequoyah Council serves Scouts in Tennessee and Virginia.

=== Shenandoah Area Council ===
Headquartered in Winchester, Virginia the Shenandoah Area Council serves Scouts in Clarke, Frederick, Page, Rappahannock, Shenandoah, and Warren counties in Virginia and Berkeley, Morgan and Jefferson Counties in West Virginia, Washington County in Maryland and Fulton County and the southern part of Franklin County in Pennsylvania. In 2023 the Mason-Dixon Council merged with Shenandoah Area Council.

==== Organization ====
The Shenandoah Area Council is divided into four districts and includes a Learning for Life division.

- Mason Dixon District: serves Washington County, Maryland and Fulton and southern Franklin Counties in Pennsylvania
- Potomac District: serves Berkeley, Jefferson and Morgan counties, and Capon Bridge and Paw Paw in West Virginia
- Shawnee District: serves the Winchester, Frederick County and Clarke County in Virginia
- Shenrapawa District: serves Page, Rappahannock, Shenandoah, and Warren counties in Virginia

==== Camps ====
Camp Rock Enon or CRE is both a Scouts BSA and Cub Scout resident summer camp with high adventure opportunities. The mineral springs of the area afforded the development of a resort in 1856. 89 years later in 1945 the resort and most of the land was converted into the Scout camp of today. The summer camp programs includes obvious outdoor programs like aquatics camping, cooking, fishing, handicraft, and shooting sports, yet also includes less common programs like canyoneering, rappelling, rock climbing, scuba, space exploration, volleyball, white water rafting, and wilderness survival. The camp includes 14 campsites that accommodate from 16 to 56 campers in tents or Adirondack shelters as well as a dining hall that can serve 450 at a time.

==== Order of the Arrow ====
Following the merger of the two councils in 2023, the OA Lodges Shenshawopotoo Lodge #276, established in 1944 and Guneukitschik Lodge #317 merged in 2024. A new name was chosen, "Onerahtokha" which means springtime and new beginnings in the Mohawk language. The Lodge number changed as well to 297 and a new totem was selected, the Fisher which has been spotted at both camps.

=== Virginia Headwaters Council ===
The Virginia Headwaters Council (VAHC) serves Scouts in areas of the Shenandoah Valley in Virginia and West Virginia and areas of central Virginia. The first council in the area was the Staunton Council, formed in 1920 and failed in 1924. The Stonewall Jackson Council was chartered in Staunton, Virginia in January 1927 as the Stonewall Jackson Council. The council is named after General Stonewall Jackson, one of the most famous residents of the area. The Lewis & Clark Council was formed in Charlottesville in 1927; it failed in 1931 and then was incorporated into the Stonewall Jackson Council. The council was later renamed to the Stonewall Jackson Area Council. The first Scout executive of the Stonewall Jackson (Area) Council was J. Wilford Fix who served from 1927 to 1950. Fix had joined Scouting as a youth in 1911 in Richmond and was an Eagle Scout after relocating to Roanoke with his parents. The Stonewall Jackson Area Council was renamed in 2019 to the Virginia Headwaters Council.

The Order of the Arrow is represented by the Shenandoah Lodge #258. It supports the Scouting programs of the Virginia Headwaters Council through leadership, camping, and service.

=== Tidewater Council ===
Tidewater Council serves southeastern Virginia and north-eastern North Carolina. This region is often referred to as South Hampton Roads or the Tidewater or Tidewater Virginia area; hence the name of the council. One of the first councils in the country, Tidewater Council was established in 1911, just one year after William Boyce of Chicago founded Scouting in the United States, and only three years after Sir Robert Baden-Powell founded the movement in England. In 1914 the local council was issued a second-class charter, as it did not have a professional Scout executive.

Its Order of the Arrow counterpart is the Blue Heron Lodge, which was founded in 1946 when a team from Octoraro Lodge in Pennsylvania inducted the first members of Blue Heron Lodge.

=== African-American Scouting ===
Scouting amongst the black community in Virginia in the years immediately after the incorporation of the BSA in 1910 has been an under-explored topic. In many instances there has been a general assumption that black youth did not or were not allowed to participate in the movement (until many, many years later) that billed itself as the premier youth development organization in the world. While Scouting certainly helped to promote character development and citizenship in the lives of millions of mostly white youth in the decades before World War II, its impact in the black community is much less understood and poorly documented. A detailed exposition of the role of blacks in the early history of Boy Scouting across a large swath of Virginia has been presented in an online essay

== Girl Scouts of the USA ==
Girl Scouts of the United States of America
- Map of Girl Scout Councils in Virginia
- Headquarters: New York, New York
- Country: United States
- Founded: March 12, 1912; 114 years ago
- Founder: Juliette Gordon Low
- Membership: 2,164,318 youth; 846,600 adults (2013)
- CEO: Bonnie Barczykowski
- Affiliation: World Association of Girl Guides and Girl Scouts
- Website www.girlscouts.org

There are seven Girl Scout councils serving girls in Virginia; three are headquartered in the state.

=== History ===
In 1939, the Alexandria Council and the Arlington Council formed. This version of the Arlington Council included Falls Church, Fairfax City, and Fairfax County. Later the Fairfax County Council of Girl Scouts formed, but would not include all the Fairfax County troops until 1946. In 1946 the Fairfax County Council of Girl Scouts had 26 troops with 476 girls. By 1958 there were 485 troops with 7,800 girls. Before buying land in 1942 to build Camp Potomac Woods, the Arlington Council would send their Scouts to National Park Service Camp Chopowamsic in Triangle Virginia.

In 1958, The District of Columbia Council formally changed names to National Capital Council, putting an end to the informal name of Girl Scouts of the District of Columbia and Montgomery County. Also in 1958 the Fairfax County Council of Girl Scouts spread by including Falls Church and Quantico and so later took the name Northern Virginia Girl Scout Council. Then in the June 1962 issue of the Trefoil magazine the National Capital Council held a mail in vote to rename the council with the choices of: Potomac River Council, Nation's Capital Council, Greater Washington Council, and a space to write in your own suggestion. Nation's Capital Council won that contest.

That kind of consolidation continued in 1963 when the new Girl Scout Council of the Nation's Capital was formed from the National Capital, Southern Maryland, Alexandria, Arlington, and Northern Virginia councils, as well as including a single troop from Prince William, another in Fauquier, and one in Loudoun. A new Shawnee Council also formed in 1963 which consolidated the Blue Ridge Council of Virginia, the Eastern Panhandle Council of West Virginia, the Washington County Council of Maryland, and the previous Shawnee Council that included the Maryland county of Alleghany, the Maryland county of Garrett, and the Pennsylvania county of Bedford. In 1972 this much larger Shawnee Council moved their headquarters to Martinsburg, West Virginia.

=== Girl Scout Council of the Southern Appalachians ===
See Girl Scouting in Tennessee. Serves Virginia girls in the extreme southwest of Virginia.

nearest Service Center: Johnson City, Tennessee

=== Girl Scouts of Black Diamond Council ===
See Girl Scouting in West Virginia. Serves Virginia girls in Bland, Buchanan, and Tazewell counties.

Headquarters: Charleston, West Virginia

=== Girl Scouts of the Chesapeake Bay Council ===
See Scouting in Delaware. Serves Virginia girls on the Delmarva Peninsula.

Headquarters: Newark, Delaware

=== Girl Scout Council of Colonial Coast ===
Girl Scout Council of Colonial Coast serves nearly 8,000 girls, with more than 4,000 adult volunteers in southeastern Virginia and northeastern North Carolina. It was established in 1981.

Headquarters: Chesapeake, Virginia

Camps:

- Camp Darden is almost 100 acres (0.40 km^{2}) near Franklin, Virginia. It was acquired in 1961 and named after Colgate Darden and his wife.
- Camp Skimino is a 90-acre (360,000 m^{2}) camp near Williamsburg, Virginia.
- Camp Apasus is located in Norfolk, Virginia.
- Camp Burke's Mill Pond is a 30.06-acre (121,600 m^{2}) camp located in Gloucester County, Virginia. It was donated to the Heritage Girl Scout Council in 1975, along with an additional 6.23-acre (25,200 m^{2}) tract which contains the original mill house. Heritage Girl Scout Council and Tidewater Girl Scout Council merged to become the Girl Scout Council of the Colonial Coast.
- Camp Outback is a designated site on the Virginia Birding and Wildlife Trail, with an 8.5 acre nature area, and is located behind A Place for Girls, the council's headquarters and program center in Chesapeake, Virginia.

=== Girl Scouts of the Commonwealth of Virginia Council ===
The Girl Scouts of the Commonwealth of Virginia serves more than 16,000 girls and has about 5,700 adult volunteers in 30 central Virginia counties. It was chartered in 1963, when three smaller councils serving Fredericksburg, Richmond, and Southside Virginia merged. In 2007, Surry County was moved from this council to Colonial Coast. The first troop formed in central Virginia was Troop #1, Highland Springs in 1913.

In 1932 the first African-American troop in the South, Girl Scout Troop 34, was founded in Richmond by Lena B. Watson. It was first led by Lavnia Banks, a teacher from Armstrong High School. It first met in Hartshorn Hall, Virginia Union University. In 2008, a tree was planted in commemoration at Hartshorn Hall.

In 1922, Girl Scouts of Richmond was chartered. In 1942 Petersburg Girl Scout Council was formed and in 1944, Hopewell Girl Scout Council. In 1953 Petersburg and Hopewell merged to form Southside. In 1963 Southside, Richmond, and Fredericksburg councils merged to form the current council.

Headquarters: Richmond, Virginia

Camps:

- Pamunkey Ridge Girl Scout Camp is 240 acres (0.97 km^{2}) in Hanover, Virginia along the banks of the Pamunkey River. It was opened in 1996.
- Camp Kittamaqund is 387 acres (1.57 km^{2}) and 5 miles (8.0 km) of shoreline on the Northern Neck. It was named after the chief in power at the time of English arrival. The property was acquired in 1964. In 2006 the council attempted to sell the property, but the sale fell through due to zoning regulations that limited redevelopment.

Earlier camps include Camp Pocahontas acquired in 1928; Camp Pinoaka, created in 1936 for African-American Girl Scouts; and Camp Holly Dell in 1951 (sold in 1996).

=== Girl Scout Council of the Nation's Capital ===
See Girl Scout Council of the Nation's Capital. Serves girls in northern Virginia as well.

Headquarters: Washington, D.C.

=== Girl Scouts of Virginia Skyline Council ===
This council serves about 10,500 girls in 36 Virginia counties. It was established in 1963.

Headquarters: Roanoke, Virginia

Camps:

- Camp Sacajawea is 119 acres (0.48 km^{2}) on the James River near Lynchburg. It was named after the Native American woman who accompanied the Lewis and Clark Expedition.
- Camp Sugar Hollow is 60 acres (240,000 m^{2}) at the foot of the Blue Ridge Mountains near Charlottesville
- Icimani Adventure Program Center in Roanoke

== Scouting museums in Virginia ==
- Gregson Center and Museum, Pipsico Scout Reservation, Spring Grove, Virginia
- Nawakwa Lodge #3 Museum, Camp T. Brady Saunders, Maidens, Virginia (Heart of Virginia Council)

== See also ==
- President Hoover's Camp Rapidan: Use by Scouts BSA Troops
