= Shockeysville, Virginia =

Unincorporated community in Virginia, United States

- Unincorporated community
- Location within Virginia Location within the United States
- Coordinates: 39°23′9″N 78°14′38″W
- Country: United States
- State: Virginia
- County: Frederick
- Time zone: UTC−5 (Eastern (EST))
  - Summer (DST): UTC−4 (EDT)

Shockeysville is an unincorporated community in northern Frederick County, Virginia, United States. It is the northernmost community in the state.

Shockeysville is located at the junction of Shockeysville (VA 671) and Holiday (VA 691) Roads on Winding Ridge southwest of Shockeys Knob (1,873 feet/571 meters) on Sleepy Creek Mountain. The community and the knob are both named for the Shockey's, a prevalent family in the area.

== History of Shockeysville ==
"The year was 1859 in the vicinity of present-day Shockeysville. A few scattered houses existed. Elizabeth and John Shockey came to the area to settle. Daniel Daily, son of Samuel Dailey, made an agreement with Elizabeth Shockey to take care of his father Samuel, until his death. Samuel had Consumption (Tuberculosis), a very deadly disease of that time. As payment for his care, Daniel and Mary Dailey deeded 358 acres of land to Elizabeth for her sole use.

Within two years the Civil War began. Shockeysville was an area that changed hands almost daily. Winchester changed hands 72 times during the war. Shockeysville was on the way to Winchester for McNeills Raiders Confederate Cavalry from 17 counties of West Virginia who raided down the Shenandoah Valley as far as Woodstock, Virginia.

In 1864 General U.S. Grant ordered General Philip Sheridan to take the Shenandoah Valley. The valley was known as the Confederacy's granary. Sheridan was to do this by burning houses, barns and crops. He was to take livestock and kill what he couldn't use. Any person who resisted could be shot.

General George Armstrong Custer was in charge of all the Union Cavalry in the Valley Regions. He saw to the burning order with a vengeance. Cavalry from every Union state was under his command. Shockeysville did not grow during these years. All able-bodied men where off fighting for the South.

One time a Confederate soldier was captured near Shockeysville. He was being taken to Winchester to prison by Pennsylvania Cavalry. Sergeant Files was leading the detail one mile south of Shockeysville. At dusk the prisoner slipped off his horse and hid in some underbrush along the road. The Union troopers began firing in response to standing orders. Sergeant Files ordered them to halt. He said that this is a peaceful place and that he was tired of killing.

In 1882 Sergeant Files returned to the area. He saw to the building of Files Chapel Church one mile south of Shockeysville. His family is represented in the area. Some members are buried in Shockeysville Church Cemetery.

After the war, Elizabeth Shockey set about getting Shockeysville settled. Families of Luttrells, Whitacres, Clarks, Horns, DeHavens, Lamps, Nesmiths and others moved in around her land. A dozen houses, a general store, blacksmith shop, grist mill and farm buildings were built within sight of the present day Church. Foundations are still present in the woods behind the shelter area.

In 1872, Elizabeth gave land for a church. She was unhappy because they didn't have a place to worship or a school for the children. The first church was of logs. In 1896 a Post Office was in Maggie Shockey's home. She was Postmistress and General Store owner. The present day Shockey Time Capsule Monument and the old foundation are there as the house burned in 1976 while being remodeled. The Post Office closed in 1936.

On February 10, 1904, Shockeysville burned to the ground. There were two different stories about how it happened. One has the church being burned and the other has the church as being the only surviving building. In face the church was rebuilt, being finished in 1912. Our cornerstone is dated 1912 has Bethesda M.E. (Methodist Episcopal) engraved.

Some Shockeysville homes were rebuilt as the country entered the 'Roaring 1920s.' During this time, 1872–1910, Rev. John A. Shockey was a circuit rider. He traveled over the mountain regions of Virginia, West Virginia and Maryland establishing churches. Known as a church builder, he was able to accomplish a lot even though he was deaf. Being able to read lips, he continued to work almost to his death in 1910. The church in Markswood, W.V. was finished just after his death. Rev. John A Shockey is buried in Shockesyville Cemetery.

During the Great Depression of the 1930s, most of the Shockeysville people moved to Winchester or Martinsburg to find work. Some stayed like Naomi Shockey (Aunt Maggie) who lived in the house southeast of the church. This area is part of the 5 acres purchased by the Shockey Family Memorial Fellowship. Aunt Maggie was getting up in years and was afraid that God would not be able to hear the small congregation sing and worship. Her idea was to get a bell for the church. Mr. Newkirk was cutting timber on Shockey's Knob. She contracted with him to cut the boards for the bell tower. Men of the community, even some that had moved away, built the bell tower.

In 1939 the tower was complete without a bell. Mr. Newkirk also bought and sold scrap metal. He bought a bell from Clearspring, Maryland High School which had collapsed during a storm. Mr. Newkirk's employee and men of the community installed the bell.

Shockeysville Church Bell was made in 1850 in Ohio. In 1970 I wrote the company for information. They were interested in the fact that the bell still worked. In 1898 they had discontinued making that type of bell.

In 1976 we were contacted by a group from the new Clearspring Maryland High School. They wanted our bell to place on display. We kept our bell. They placed another new type bell in their special area of the High School. Aunt Maggie died in 1940, just a year before World War II. Shockeysville Church bell still rings calling people to worship and Shockey reunion meetings to order.

I came along in 1951, the 18th child of Harry Lee and Annabell (Mason) Luttrell; ten boys and eight girls. The church core consisted of Mom, Dad, Burt Mason, husband of Rostella B. (Aunt Bea) Shockey Mason, Eva (Luttrell) Shaver, Marvin Shaver, Dorothy (Luttrell) Naismith, her husband, Roy Naismith and their family members.

My parents and oldest sister Violet (Luttrell) Moyer's old stories got me interested in family, local and church history. Some stories like the buggy trip of Rostella and Grace Shockey to Martinsburg.

"In the 1930s few people could afford a car. Rostella and Grace went to Martinsburg by horse and buggy to buy a dresser. Their prize roped down, they started home from a day's adventure. Along toward dusk as they got close to home, a sudden thunder storm came up. Rostella was not able to control the horse. The runaway ran right up on my family's porch. My father, Harry Luttrell was just able to get the horse stopped as it put its head right through the screen door. Both young ladies were OK and the horse was able to get them home safely. Rostella would later say, "If God had meant for me to have wings while on Earth, he would have given them to me." Gracie loved the ride and in later years she would travel all over the world by airplane. Rostella (Aunt Bea) (Shockey) Mason became Church Treasurer for more than fifty-five years."

Another story of life in Shockeysville happened in 1937. "It was late in the Fall and as they did, neighbor helped neighbor to harvest their crops. The Place family was going about getting in the last hay crop. Cut hay was being pitchforked and stacked on wagons. All of a sudden a fast moving buggy came to a halt. Out jumps Grandfather Place carrying his shot gun. He was jumping up and down hopping mad. His son leaped off the wagon to find out what was going on. After a while he found out that Grandfather Place had heard over the radio that the Japanese had taken Shanghai. Grandfather wanted all the men to go home and get their guns and go over the mountain to stop the Japanese. It took them 20 minutes to calm Grandfather down. He couldn't be convinced that the Shanghai that he heard about was in China. He thought Shanghai, West Virginia over the mountains to the west was under attack. Once he was calmed down he still wanted them to get their guns and put an end to all Japanese. You see, Grandfather Place was a Civil War Veteran over 90 years old. His argument was to stop the Japanese before they bombed the United States. Being ahead of his time, Grandfather Place was not around four years later when the Japanese bombed Pearl Harbor, Hawaii on December 7, 1941." These and many more stories of everyday life in Shockeysville filled my youth.

In the 1970s people and events encouraged me to want to take care of the church. I had been carried in as a baby and joined as a member when I was eight years old. The church was beginning to be in need to repairs by the time I turned 21. Getting my brothers, family members, and anybody who would help, we started remodeling the church by painting the outside. Ralph Shockey Sr, came and wanted to know how the newly formed Family reunion could help. From that day forward, the Shockeys, Luttrells, Naismiths, Masons and others with fundraisers and yard parties, we worked to make Shockeysville better.

We cleared trees in the shelter area, built five shelters and erected 2 metal buildings. Siding was put on the church, a new roof installed, new bell tower enclosure, a well, chain link fence, dozens of small painting and repair jobs, storm windows and more. The Shockey Reunion bought 5 acres next to the shelter area and Margaret (Shockey) Dunn left 5 acres of the woods behind the shelters to the church.

The little congregation still worships in the church 137 years later. Elizabeth, John, Aunt Maggie Shockey and many others would be proud to know that we are moving forward.

Shockeysville has always had a will to survive."

== Historic sites ==
- Shockeysville United Methodist Church
- Maggie Shockey's Old Homestead
- The Shockey's of America 1737-2000 Time Capsule
- Shockey's Knoll
