= Mountain Falls Park, Virginia =

Unincorporated community in Virginia, United States

- Unincorporated community
- Location within Virginia Location within the United States
- Coordinates: 39°9′28″N 78°23′27″W
- Country: United States
- State: Virginia
- County: Frederick
- Time zone: UTC−5 (Eastern (EST))
  - Summer (DST): UTC−4 (EDT)
- GNIS feature ID: 1987027

Mountain Falls Park is an unincorporated community in Frederick County, Virginia, United States. Mountain Falls Park is located on the eastern slope of the Great North Mountain to the east of the West Virginia border.
