= Gravel Springs, Virginia =

Unincorporated community in Virginia, United States

- Unincorporated community
- Location within Virginia Location within the United States
- Coordinates: 39°4′30″N 78°26′25″W
- Country: United States
- State: Virginia
- County: Frederick
- Time zone: UTC−5 (Eastern (EST))
  - Summer (DST): UTC−4 (EDT)
- GNIS feature ID: 1495609

Gravel Springs is an unincorporated community in Frederick County, Virginia, United States. Gravel Springs was established in 1872. It lies south of Star Tannery at the intersection of Brill, Star Tannery, and Gravel Springs Roads.
