= Ridings Mill, Virginia =

Unincorporated community in Virginia, United States

- Unincorporated community
- Location within Virginia Location within the United States
- Coordinates: 39°1′46″N 78°14′29″W
- Country: United States
- State: Virginia
- County: Frederick
- Time zone: UTC−5 (Eastern (EST))
  - Summer (DST): UTC−4 (EDT)
- GNIS feature ID: 1499960

Ridings Mill is an unincorporated community in southern Frederick County, Virginia, United States. Ridings Mill takes its name from the mill on West Run there. The community is located to the east of Middletown at the crossroads of Ridings Mill and Huttle Roads. Named for the mill located on West Run on Ridings Mill Road, this is a rural area consisting mainly of farms.
