= Indian Hollow, Virginia =

Unincorporated community in Virginia, United States

- Unincorporated community
- Location within Virginia Location within the United States
- Coordinates: 39°14′28″N 78°15′47″W
- Country: United States
- State: Virginia
- County: Frederick
- Time zone: UTC−5 (Eastern (EST))
  - Summer (DST): UTC−4 (EDT)
- GNIS feature ID: 1779225

Indian Hollow is an unincorporated community along Hogue Creek in Frederick County, Virginia, United States. It is named for the Indian Hollow through Hunting Ridge. The community is located on Indian Hollow Road (VA 679) northeast of Hayfield.
