= Albin, Virginia =

Unincorporated community in Virginia, United States

- Unincorporated community
- Location within Virginia Location within the United States
- Coordinates: 39°13′18″N 78°11′55″W
- Country: United States
- State: Virginia
- County: Frederick
- Time zone: UTC−5 (Eastern (EST))
  - Summer (DST): UTC−4 (EDT)
- GNIS feature ID: 1499046

Albin is an unincorporated community in Frederick County, Virginia, United States. Albin lies to the northwest of Winchester on North Frederick Pike (U.S. Highway 522). It was also known as Bryarly.
