= Leetown, Virginia =

Unincorporated community in Virginia, United States

- Unincorporated community
- Location within Virginia Location within the United States
- Coordinates: 39°13′37″N 78°4′39″W
- Country: United States
- State: Virginia
- County: Frederick
- Time zone: UTC−5 (Eastern (EST))
  - Summer (DST): UTC−4 (EDT)
- GNIS feature ID: 1477483

Leetown is an unincorporated community in northern Frederick County, Virginia, United States. Leetown is located on Old Charles Town Road (VA 761) at its intersection with Gun Club Road (VA 666) to the west of Opequon Creek. According to the Geographic Names Information System, Leetown has also been known throughout its history as Opequon Hill.
