= Meadow Mills, Virginia =

Unincorporated community in Virginia, United States

- Unincorporated community
- Location within Virginia Location within the United States
- Coordinates: 39°1′23″N 78°18′21″W
- Country: United States
- State: Virginia
- County: Frederick
- Time zone: UTC−5 (Eastern (EST))
  - Summer (DST): UTC−4 (EDT)
- GNIS feature ID: 1495924

Meadow Mills is an unincorporated community in Frederick County, Virginia, United States. Meadow Mills is located in southern Frederick County southwest of Middletown on Cedar Creek, hence its former eponymous name of Cedar Creek.

The presence of grain as local crop in Meadow Mills is indicated in an 1882 issue of The Stephen City Star community newspaper where the presence of mills and the use of threshes within the community of Meadow Mills is mentioned. Two Meadow Mills residents, J. and W. Hottel are also named as millers.
