= Siler, Virginia =

Unincorporated community in Virginia, United States

- Unincorporated community
- Location within Virginia Location within the United States
- Coordinates: 39°21′2″N 78°14′20″W
- Country: United States
- State: Virginia
- County: Frederick
- Time zone: UTC−5 (Eastern (EST))
  - Summer (DST): UTC−4 (EDT)
- GNIS feature ID: 1477752

Siler is an unincorporated community in Frederick County, Virginia, United States. Siler is located in northern Frederick County on Brush Creek at the crossroads of Brush Creek, Howards Chapel (VA 690), and Siler Roads.
