= Brucetown, Virginia =

Unincorporated community in Virginia, United States

- Census-designated place
- Location within Virginia Location within the United States
- Coordinates: 39°15′16″N 78°4′0″W
- Country: United States
- State: Virginia
- County: Frederick

Area
  - Total: 0.57 sq mi (1.47 km^{2})

Population (2020)
  - Total: 274
  - Density: 483/sq mi (186/km^{2})
- Time zone: UTC−5 (Eastern (EST))
  - Summer (DST): UTC−4 (EDT)
- GNIS feature ID: 1495313

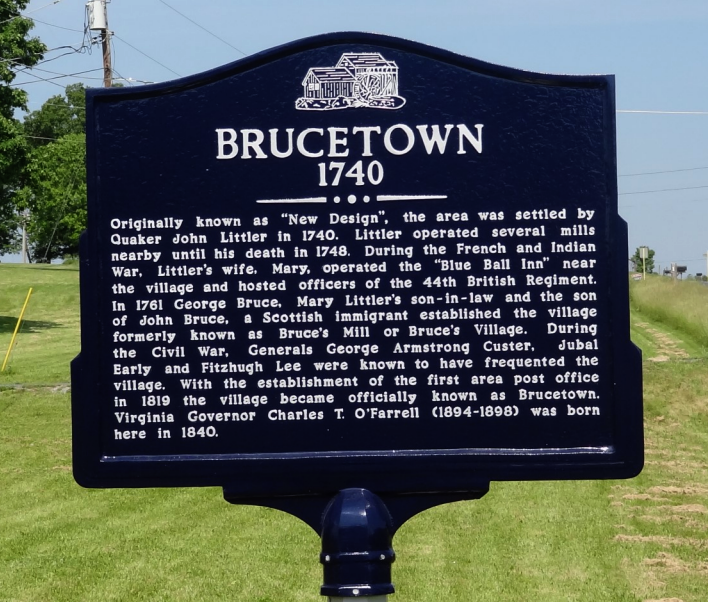
The roadside marker for historic Brucetown, Virginia

Brucetown is an unincorporated community and census-designated place (CDP) in northern Frederick County, Virginia, United States. It was first listed as a CDP in the 2020 census with a population of 274. Brucetown lies at the intersection of Brucetown and Sir John Roads. A post office was established in the community in 1819. Brucetown also had its own school in operation from 1871 to 1941.

== History ==
Brucetown was named for the Bruce family, some of the earliest Europeans that settled there. Sir John Robert Bruce, I came to the area between 1731 and 1737, and built a grist and sawmill that established the village. John Bruce (son of Thomas Bruce and Mary Christian Bruce of Scotland) was christened in the Church of Scotland (Presbyterian) on September 7, 1690. In Aberdeen Scotland, three of John's children were also christened in Scotland: James Bruce on May 20, 1720, George Bruce on April 27, 1722, and Margaret Bruce on March 5, 1727. He willed 150 acres each to his sons George and James. His son George Bruce continued the operation of the mill in Brucetown, Virginia and also operated a tavern. This became known as Bruce's Mills and later, Brucetown.

=== Historic Village Marker "Brucetown 1740" ===
There exists today (at roughly coordinates 39.2546921,-78.0671202, near 1955 State Rte 672, Clear Brook, VA) a historic town marker for Brucetown, VA which reads as follows:

"BRUCETOWN 1740. Originally known as "New Design" the area was settled by Quaker John Littler (1708–1748) in 1740. Littler operated several mills nearby until his death in 1748. During the French and Indian War, Littler's wife Mary (née Mary Ross, 1707–1741) operated the "Blue Ball Inn" near the village and hosted officers of the 44th British Regiment. In 1761 George Bruce, Mary Littler's son-in-law (married to Rachel Littler, 1737–1821) and the son of John Bruce a Scottish immigrant, established the village formerly known as "Bruce's Mill" or "Bruce's Village". During the American Civil War, Generals George Armstrong Custer, Jubal Early, and Fitzhugh Lee were known to have frequented the village. With the establishment of the first area post office in 1819, the village became officially known as Brucetown. Virginia Governor Charles T. O'Farrell (1894–1898) was born (here) in 1840."

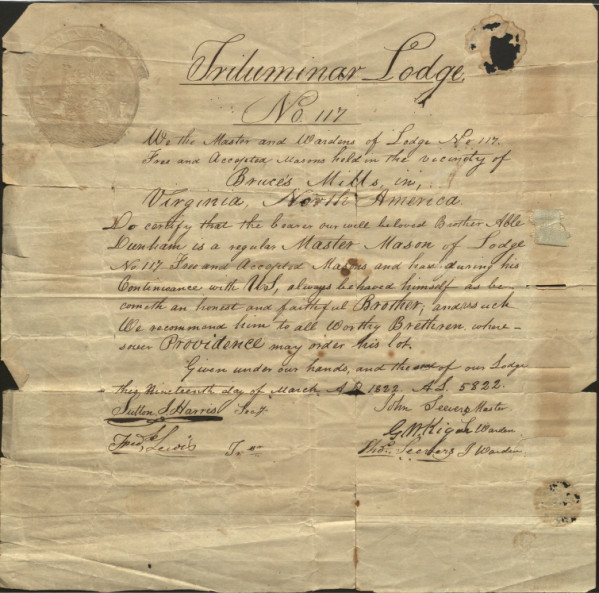
Freemason Trilumniar Lodge No. 117 was first located in Brucetown, Virginia

== Demographics ==
Brucetown first appeared as a census designated place in the 2020 U.S. census.
