= Wilde Acres, Virginia =

Unincorporated community in Virginia, United States

- Unincorporated community
- Location within Virginia Location within the United States
- Coordinates: 39°8′49″N 78°23′59″W
- Country: United States
- State: Virginia
- County: Frederick
- Time zone: UTC−5 (Eastern (EST))
  - Summer (DST): UTC−4 (EDT)
- GNIS feature ID: 1493802

Wilde Acres is an unincorporated community in Frederick County, Virginia, United States. Wilde Acres is a planned community on the eastern face of Great North Mountain near the Mountain Falls on Fall Run.

Wilde Acres was formerly known as Mountain Falls Park. Between 1988-2025, the name Mt.Falls Park was changed to Wilde Acres.
