= McQuire, Virginia =

Unincorporated community in Virginia, United States

- Unincorporated community
- Location within Virginia Location within the United States
- Coordinates: 39°13′18″N 78°16′37″W
- Country: United States
- State: Virginia
- County: Frederick
- Time zone: UTC−5 (Eastern (EST))
  - Summer (DST): UTC−4 (EDT)
- GNIS feature ID: 1779241

McQuire is an unincorporated community in Frederick County, Virginia, United States. McQuire is located along Hogue Creek at the intersection of the Northwestern Turnpike (U.S. Route 50) and Back Mountain Road (SR 614).
