= Green Spring, Frederick County, Virginia =

Unincorporated community in Virginia, United States

- Unincorporated community
- Location within Virginia Location within the United States
- Coordinates: 39°18′15″N 78°10′10″W
- Country: United States
- State: Virginia
- County: Frederick
- Time zone: UTC−5 (Eastern (EST))
  - Summer (DST): UTC−4 (EDT)
- GNIS feature ID: 1499496

Green Spring is an unincorporated community in northern Frederick County, Virginia, United States. Green Spring lies on the southern flank of North Mountain along Green Spring Run, a tributary stream of Back Creek. The community is located on Green Spring Road (VA 671) at its junction with Cedar Grove Road (VA 654).

== Historic sites ==
- Old Stone Church (1820), listed on the National Register of Historic Places
