= Cedar Hill, Frederick County, Virginia =

Unincorporated community in Virginia, United States

- Unincorporated community
- Location within Virginia Location within the United States
- Coordinates: 39°16′35″N 78°6′50″W
- Country: United States
- State: Virginia
- County: Frederick
- Time zone: UTC−5 (Eastern (EST))
  - Summer (DST): UTC−4 (EDT)
- GNIS feature ID: 1495363

Cedar Hill is an unincorporated community in northern Frederick County, Virginia, United States. Cedar Hill is located to the northwest of Clear Brook off Cedar Hill Road along Browns Lane.
