= Vaucluse, Virginia =

Unincorporated community in Virginia, United States

- Unincorporated community
- Location within Virginia Location within the United States
- Coordinates: 39°3′29″N 78°14′49″W
- Country: United States
- State: Virginia
- County: Frederick
- Time zone: UTC−5 (Eastern (EST))
  - Summer (DST): UTC−4 (EDT)
- GNIS feature ID: 1500253

Vaucluse is an unincorporated community in Frederick County, Virginia, United States. Vaucluse is located on U.S. Route 11 south of Stephens City.
