= Welltown, Virginia =

Unincorporated community in Virginia, United States

- Unincorporated community
- Location within Virginia Location within the United States
- Coordinates: 39°15′12″N 78°8′3″W
- Country: United States
- State: Virginia
- County: Frederick
- Time zone: UTC−5 (Eastern (EST))
  - Summer (DST): UTC−4 (EDT)
- GNIS feature ID: 1477866

Welltown is an unincorporated community in northern Frederick County, Virginia, United States.

== Historic sites ==
- Galilee Church
- Welltown United Methodist Church
