= Mount Pleasant, Frederick County, Virginia =

Unincorporated community in Virginia, United States

- Unincorporated hamlet
- Location within Virginia Location within the United States
- Coordinates: 39°10′19″N 78°17′42″W
- Country: United States
- State: Virginia
- County: Frederick
- Time zone: UTC−5 (Eastern (EST))
  - Summer (DST): UTC−4 (EDT)
- GNIS feature ID: 1495973

Mount Pleasant is an unincorporated hamlet in Frederick County, Virginia, United States. Mount Pleasant is nestled between Hunting and Whisson Ridges on Wardensville Grade (VA 608).
