= Burnt Factory, Virginia =

Unincorporated community in Virginia, United States

- Unincorporated community
- Location within Virginia Location within the United States
- Coordinates: 39°11′40″N 78°4′34″W
- Country: United States
- State: Virginia
- County: Frederick
- Time zone: UTC−5 (Eastern (EST))
  - Summer (DST): UTC−4 (EDT)
- GNIS feature ID: 1499194

Burnt Factory is an unincorporated community in Frederick County, Virginia, United States. Burnt Factory lies to the northeast of Winchester along Opequon Creek. The community is centered at the intersection of Burnt Factory and Jordan Springs Roads.
