= Camp Rock Enon =

Summer camp in Gore, Virginia, US

- Camp logo on a patch

- Owner: Shenandoah Area Council
- Location: Gore, Virginia at the base of Great North Mountain
- Country: United States
- Coordinates: 39°12′51″N 78°23′16″W
- Camp size: 877 acres (3.55 km^{2})
- Founded: 1944
- Website https://www.camprockenon.org

Camp Rock Enon or CRE is a Boy Scouts of America resident summer camp for both younger and older youth with high adventure opportunities. The mineral springs of the area afforded the development of a resort in 1856. In 1944 the resort and most of the land began the conversion to youth development resources. The summer camp includes familiar outdoor programs like aquatics, camping, cooking, fishing, handicraft, and shooting sports, yet also includes less common programs like canyoneering, rappelling, rock climbing, scuba, space exploration, volleyball, white water rafting, and wilderness survival. The property includes 14 campsites that accommodate from 16 to 56 campers, as well as a dining hall that can serve 450.

== History ==
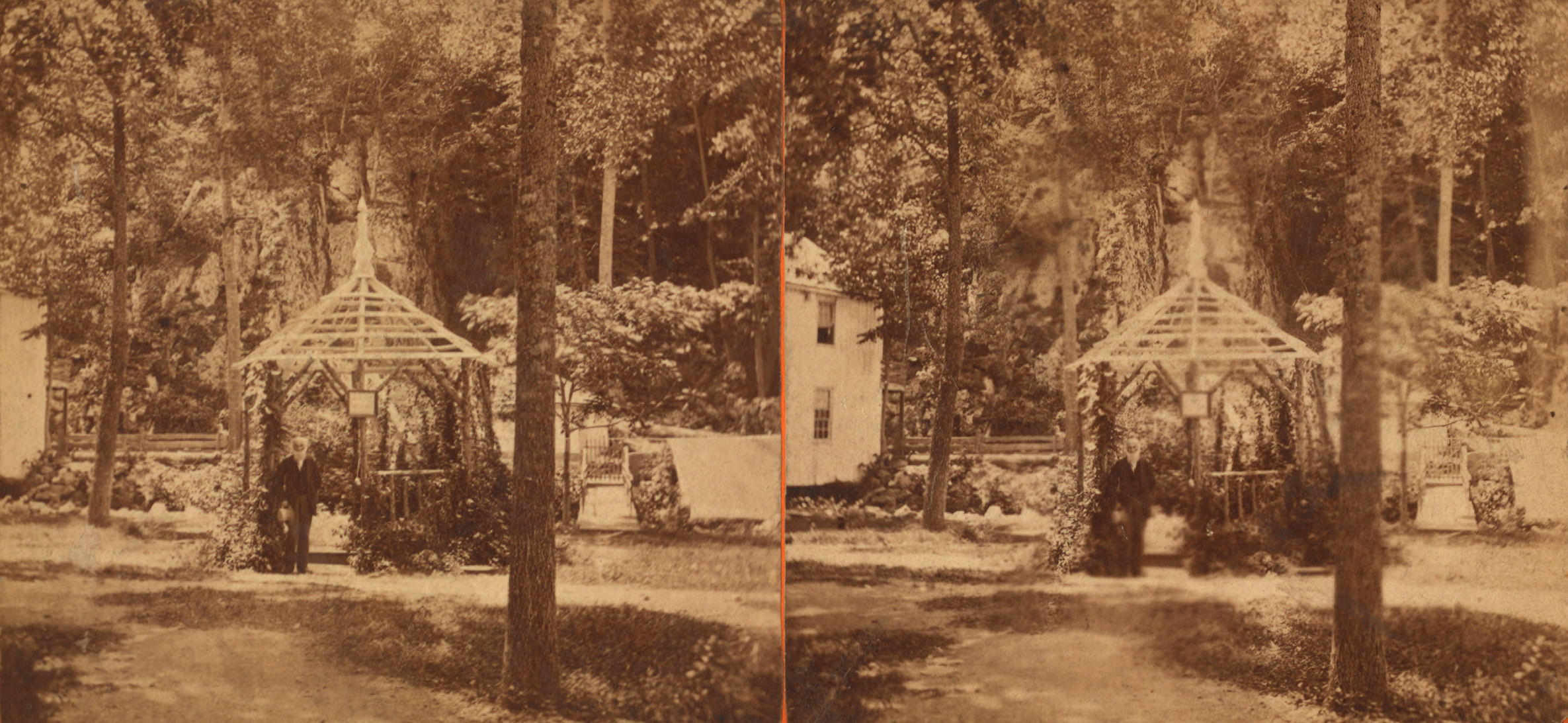
Property in the mid to late 1800s

Most of the area history is wrapped around the four (alkaline, saline, chalybeate, and sulphuretted) types of mineral water springs that naturally occur on the land. The area was once called Capper Springs, named for area settler John Capper. William Marker bought the 942 acres (381 ha) in 1856 and built a hotel that survived the American Civil War. On March 24, 1899 the Shenandoah Valley National Bank purchased the property for $3,500. During the summer of 1914 botanists found a wide variety of ferns on the property. The idea that soaking in the spring water had medical value was likely a large part of the tourism. In 1917 the Winchester and Western Railroad stopped at Rock Enon Springs. In 1944, when that healing idea was likely no longer generally accepted as true, the Glaize family sold the property to the Shenandoah Area Council who turned what was once a resort into a summer camp. In 1944, Miller Lake was created by adding an earth dam across Laruel Run using equipment owned by the Federal Fish Hatchery in Leestown. In 1958 "walnut, chestnut and persimmon trees" were planted on the property. Today Rock Enon is accredited as both a Cub Scout resident camp and a Boy Scout camp.

== Facilities ==
Each of the 14 campsites contains a bulletin board, campfire circle, cots, flag pole, latrine, pavilion, picnic tables, wash station, and either two person wall tents or Adirondack shelters.

Poland Lodge dining hall, named for Shenandoah Area Council president Bonn A. Poland Sr. who spent weekends using a bulldozer to excavate Miller Lake, can accommodate 450 at a time. The activities building dates back to at least 1989. While all Scout camps include some form of a health lodge, Rock Enon is one of the few that have a medical staff that includes a board certified physician. The camp has a shower house for youth that can accommodate 350 campers and another for adults that can accommodate 100 campers each week. In 2013 the camp planned to add another shower house with commodes near the Molden Shooting Sports area. Other facilities include a handicraft lodge, trading post, and troop lodge.

In 2010, the Order of the Arrow worked more than 5,000 service hours at the camp.

== See also ==
- Scouting in Maryland
- Scouting in Pennsylvania
- Scouting in Virginia
- Scouting in West Virginia
