= Lake Holiday, Virginia =

Lake Holiday
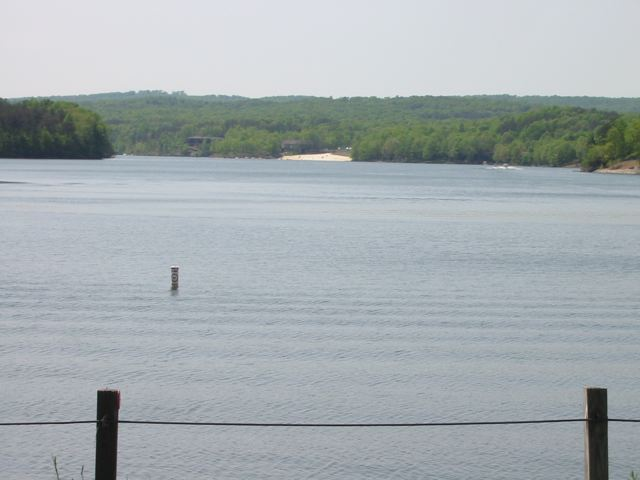

- Location within Virginia Location within the United States
- Location: Frederick County, Virginia
- Coordinates: 39.31°N 78.32°W
- Type: Reservoir
- Primary inflows: Isaacs Creek, Yeiders Run/Miller Run
- Primary outflows: Isaacs Creek
- Basin countries: United States
- Settlements: Cross Junction

Lake Holiday is a 249-acre (101 ha) artificial lake located northwest of Winchester in Frederick County, Virginia, United States. The lake flows into Isaacs Creek, an eastward-flowing tributary of Back Creek, which flows north through West Virginia to the Potomac River. The main creeks feeding the lake are Isaacs Creek and Yeiders Run/Miller Run.

Residential development surrounds the lake and forms the Lake Holiday census-designated place (CDP); as of the 2020 census, it had a population of 2,196. It is an unincorporated community subject to a property owners association. The postal address is Cross Junction, which lies 1 mile (1.6 km) to the northeast along U.S. Route 522, and has a ZIP Code of 22625.

Lake Holiday is approximately one mile southeast of the boundary with the western border of Hampshire County, West Virginia. Winchester is 14 miles (23 km) to the southeast via US 522, and Berkeley Springs, West Virginia, is 23 miles (37 km) to the north.

== Description ==
Construction on the dam that forms the lake began in the late 1960s and was finished early in 1972. According to history from the original builders of Lake Holiday, it took nearly 12 years for the lake to fill to capacity. There appears to be additional information from a second source that states the lake filled to capacity when in 1972 between June 16 and 23, Hurricane Agnes hit the Mid-Atlantic states, dumping approximately 19 inches (480 mm) of rain per hour, which caused the lake to fill in a matter of days. Scuba diving is deemed unsafe and not allowed.

A new spillway has been installed on the existing dam. The spillway was required by the US Army Corps of Engineers due to changing standards and post 11 September 2001 incidents. The construction consisted of the building of a new bridge and a redesign of the downstream creek bed. The only other option was to reduce the level of the lake by 8 to 10 feet (2.4 to 3.0 m). The spillway project was completed in June 2013 with a grand reopening of South Lakeview Drive (spillway road) on Memorial Day. The improvement cost the residents of the lake community over $10.5 million.

Lake Holiday has a private marina available for use by members. There are also tennis and basketball courts located near the club house.

== Demographics ==
Historical population
Census	Pop.	Note	%±
2010	1,905		—
2020	2,196		15.3%
U.S. Decennial Census; 2010 2020

Lake Holiday was first listed as a census designated place in the 2010 U.S. census.
