= Star Tannery, Virginia =

Unincorporated community in Virginia, United States

- Unincorporated community
- Location within Virginia Location within the United States
- Coordinates: 39°4′44″N 78°25′38″W
- Country: United States
- State: Virginia
- County: Frederick
- Time zone: UTC−5 (Eastern (EST))
  - Summer (DST): UTC−4 (EDT)
- ZIP codes: 22654
- GNIS feature ID: 1487528

Star Tannery is an unincorporated community in southwestern Frederick County, Virginia, United States, on the Shenandoah County line. Star Tannery is located on Star Tannery Road (State Route 604) off Wardensville Pike (State Route 55) along Cedar Creek. The Zip Code for Star Tannery is 22654.
