= Cross Junction, Virginia =

Unincorporated community in Virginia, United States

- Unincorporated community
- Location within Virginia Location within the United States
- Coordinates: 39°19′13″N 78°17′36″W
- Country: United States
- State: Virginia
- County: Frederick
- Time zone: UTC−5 (Eastern (EST))
  - Summer (DST): UTC−4 (EDT)
- ZIP codes: 22625
- GNIS feature ID: 1477234

Cross Junction is an unincorporated community in northern Frederick County, Virginia, United States. Cross Junction is located on the North Frederick Pike (U.S. Highway 522) at its intersection with Collinsville Road. Cross Junction also encompasses the residential communities at Lake Holiday to the south.

== History and terrain ==
Cross Junction and its environs consist of rain-fed streams and springs. It is the traditional home of the indigenous Shawnee, who had a settlement and court at Shawnee Springs. A few old farms in the area are owned by descendants of the founders of the European-American community, which date from the 18th century. Some farms date to when George Washington originally surveyed the land.
