= Frederick County, Virginia =

County in Virginia, United States

- County
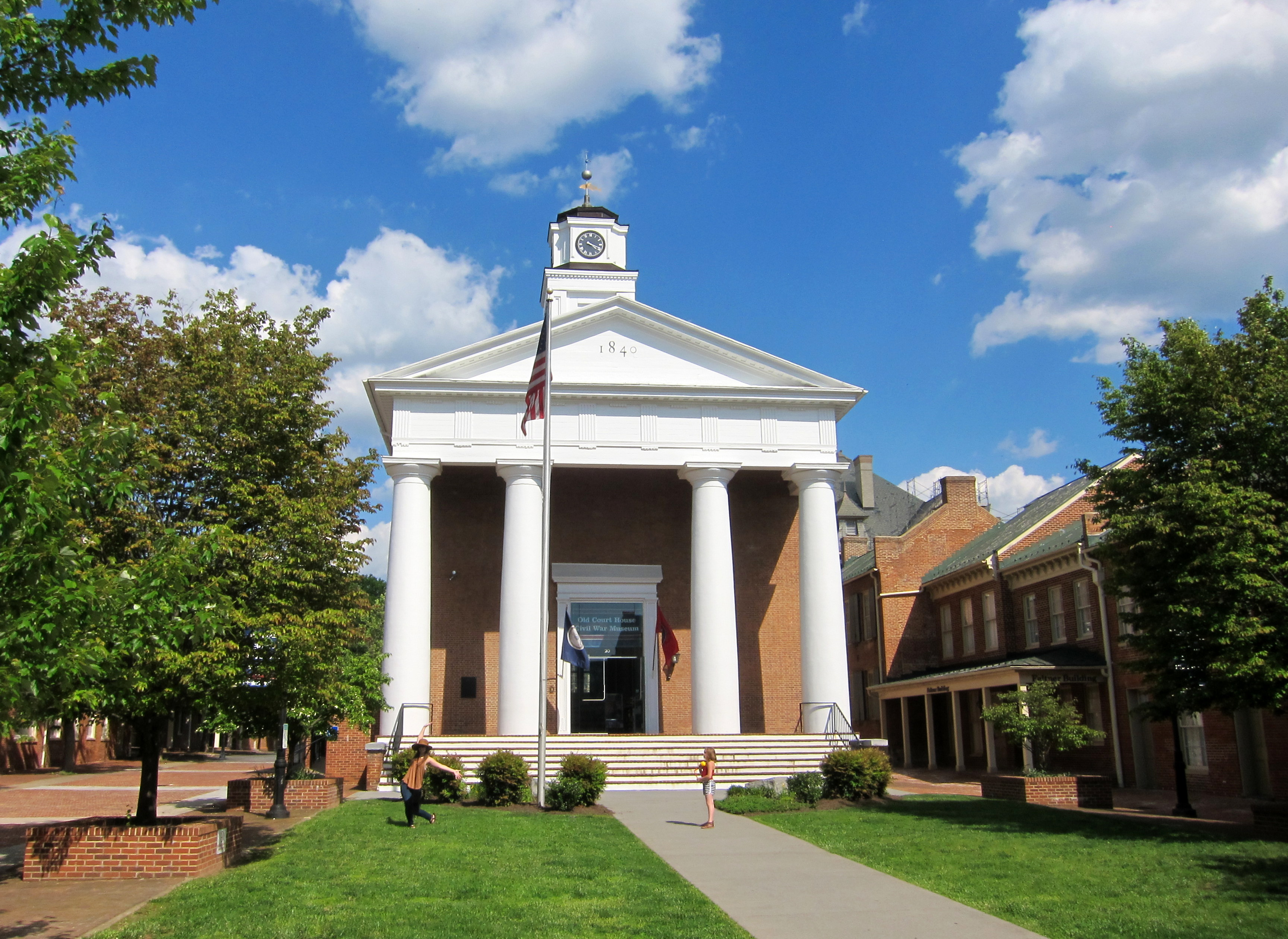
- The Old Frederick County Courthouse in Winchester

- Flag Seal

- Location within the U.S. state of Virginia
- Coordinates: 39°13′N 78°16′W
- Country: United States
- State: Virginia
- Founded: 1743
- Named for: Frederick, Prince of Wales
- Seat: Winchester (independent city)^{1}
- Largest town: Stephens City

Area
  - Total: 416 sq mi (1,080 km^{2})
  - Land: 414 sq mi (1,070 km^{2})
  - Water: 2 sq mi (5.2 km^{2}) 0.5%

Population (2020)
  - Total: 91,419
  - Estimate (2025): 99,955 ▲
  - Density: 221/sq mi (85.3/km^{2})
- Time zone: UTC−5 (Eastern)
  - Summer (DST): UTC−4 (EDT)
- Congressional district: 6th
- Website: www.fcva.us

Frederick County is the northernmost county in the Commonwealth of Virginia. Its county seat is the historic independent city of Winchester, and, as of the 2020 United States census, the population was 91,419. Part of the Northern Virginia region, Frederick County is included in the Winchester, VA-WV Metropolitan Statistical Area, which is also included in the Washington-Baltimore-Northern Virginia, DC-MD-VA-WV-PA Combined Statistical Area.

The county was formed in 1743 by splitting Orange County.

== History ==
The area that would become Frederick County, Virginia, was inhabited and transited by various indigenous peoples for thousands of years before European colonization.

Colonization efforts began with the Virginia Company of London, but European settlement did not flourish until after the company lost its charter and Virginia became a royal colony in 1624. In order to stimulate migration to the colony, the headright system was used. Under this system, those who funded an emigrant's transportation costs (not the actual colonizers) were compensated with land. In 1649 the exiled King Charles II granted several acres of colonial Virginia lands to "seven loyal supporters", including Lord Fairfax. The Fairfax lands passed to Thomas Fairfax, 5th Lord Fairfax of Cameron (1657-1710), who married the daughter of Thomas Colepeper, who also owned several acres of land. After their son, Lord Thomas Fairfax, inherited the combined grants, he controlled over 5,000,000 acres of land in Virginia, including much of the land that became Frederick County.

Frederick County was created from Orange County in 1738, and was officially organized in 1743. The Virginia Assembly named the new county for Frederick Louis, Prince of Wales (1707–1751), the eldest son of King George II of Great Britain. At that time, "Old Frederick County" encompassed all or part of four counties in present-day Virginia and five in present-day West Virginia:

- Hampshire (West Virginia), created 1754
- Dunmore, created 1772 and renamed Shenandoah in 1778
- Berkeley (West Virginia), created 1772
- Hardy (West Virginia), created 1786
- Jefferson (West Virginia), created 1801
- Morgan (West Virginia), created 1820
- Page, created 1831
- Clarke, created 1836
- Warren, created 1836

=== Colonial era ===
As commanding officer of the new Colonial Virginia regiment in 1754, Colonel George Washington located his headquarters in Winchester before and during the French and Indian War. He resigned from military service in 1758. He represented Frederick County in his first elective office, having been elected to the House of Burgesses in 1758 and 1761.

Seventeen years later, on June 15, 1775, the Continental Congress "elected" George Washington as commander-in-chief of the yet-to-be-created Continental Army. He accepted the appointment the next day.

=== American Civil War ===
Winchester was a site of volatile conditions during the Civil War of 1861–1865, with control shifting between the Confederate and Union armies on average once every three weeks during the war. Many battles were fought in Frederick County. Some of those battles included:

- First Battle of Kernstown, March 1862
- First Battle of Winchester, May 1862
- Second Battle of Winchester, June 1863
- Second Battle of Kernstown, July 1864
- Third Battle of Winchester (Battle of Opequon), September 1864
- Battle of Cedar Creek, October 1864

The first constitution of West Virginia provided for Frederick County to be added to the new state if approved by a local election. Unlike neighboring Berkeley and Jefferson counties, Frederick County remained in Virginia; as it was occupied by the Confederate army, no vote was permitted to ascertain the residents' wishes.

== Civilian history of the area ==
Four (alkaline, saline, chalybeate, and sulphured) types of mineral water springs naturally occur on the land that would later be named Rock Enon Springs. The area was once called Capper Springs, named for area settler John Capper. William Marker bought the 942 acres (381 ha) in 1856 and built a hotel, the first building of the Rock Enon Springs Resort. It survived the American Civil War. On March 24, 1899, the Shenandoah Valley National Bank purchased the property for $3,500. During the summer of 1914 botanists found a variety of ferns on the property: polypodium vulgare, phegopteris hexagonoptera, adiantum pedatum, pteris aquilina, and cheilanthes lanosa.

The idea that soaking in the natural spring water had medical value made this and other springs popular tourist destinations through the early 20th century.

In 1944, people no longer had as much faith in the springs, and there was much more competition for tourists at other sites. Due to declining business, the Glaize family sold the property to the Shenandoah Area Council. They adapted the resort to operate as a Boy Scout site, Camp Rock Enon. In 1944 the 5 acres (0.020 km^{2}) Miller Lake was created by adding a 200 feet (61 m) earth dam across Laurel Run using equipment, owned by the Federal fish hatchery in Leestown. In 1958 "walnut, chestnut and persimmon trees" were planted on the property.

== Geography ==

According to the U.S. Census Bureau, the county has a total area of 416 square miles (1,080 km^{2}), of which 414 square miles (1,070 km^{2}) is land and 2 square miles (5.2 km^{2}) (0.5%) is water. This is the northernmost county in the Commonwealth of Virginia.

=== Adjacent counties ===
- Clarke County – east
- Warren County – south
- Shenandoah County – southwest
- Hardy County, West Virginia – southwest
- Hampshire County, West Virginia – west
- Morgan County, West Virginia – north
- Berkeley County, West Virginia – northeast
- Winchester – surrounded by Frederick County

=== National protected areas ===
- Cedar Creek and Belle Grove National Historical Park (part)
- George Washington National Forest (part)

== Demographics ==
Historical population
Census	Pop.	Note	%±
1790	19,681		—
1800	24,744		25.7%
1810	22,574		−8.8%
1820	24,706		9.4%
1830	26,046		5.4%
1840	14,242		−45.3%
1850	15,975		12.2%
1860	16,546		3.6%
1870	16,596		0.3%
1880	17,553		5.8%
1890	17,880		1.9%
1900	13,239		−26.0%
1910	12,787		−3.4%
1920	12,461		−2.5%
1930	13,167		5.7%
1940	14,008		6.4%
1950	17,537		25.2%
1960	21,941		25.1%
1970	28,893		31.7%
1980	34,150		18.2%
1990	45,723		33.9%
2000	59,209		29.5%
2010	78,305		32.3%
2020	91,419		16.7%
2025 (est.)	99,955	▲	9.3%
U.S. Decennial Census; 1790–1960 1900–1990; 1990–2000 2010 2020; The drop from 1830 to 1840 was because Clarke and Warren counties were split off.

=== Racial and ethnic composition ===
Frederick County, Virginia – Racial and ethnic composition Note: the US Census treats Hispanic/Latino as an ethnic category. This table excludes Latinos from the racial categories and assigns them to a separate category. Hispanics/Latinos may be of any race.
Race / Ethnicity (NH = Non-Hispanic)	Pop 1980	Pop 1990	Pop 2000	Pop 2010	Pop 2020	% 1980	% 1990	% 2000	% 2010	% 2020
White alone (NH)	33,441	44,312	55,653	67,590	71,739	97.92%	96.91%	93.99%	86.32%	78.47%
Black or African American alone (NH)	483	830	1,538	3,067	3,605	1.41%	1.82%	2.60%	3.92%	3.94%
Native American or Alaska Native alone (NH)	18	62	76	182	120	0.05%	0.14%	0.13%	0.23%	0.13%
Asian alone (NH)	67	215	385	959	1,661	0.20%	0.47%	0.65%	1.22%	1.82%
Native Hawaiian or Pacific Islander alone (NH)	x	x	8	30	39	x	x	0.01%	0.04%	0.04%
Other race alone (NH)	12	13	39	103	402	0.04%	0.03%	0.07%	0.13%	0.44%
Mixed race or Multiracial (NH)	x	x	506	1,206	3,863	x	x	0.85%	1.54%	4.23%
Hispanic or Latino (any race)	129	291	1,004	5,168	9,990	0.38%	0.64%	1.70%	6.60%	10.93%
Total	34,150	45,723	59,209	78,305	91,419	100.00%	100.00%	100.00%	100.00%	100.00%

=== 2020 census ===
As of the 2020 census, the county had a population of 91,419. The median age was 40.9 years. 23.0% of residents were under the age of 18 and 18.0% of residents were 65 years of age or older. For every 100 females there were 97.0 males, and for every 100 females age 18 and over there were 94.9 males age 18 and over.

The racial makeup of the county was 80.4% White, 4.1% Black or African American, 0.3% American Indian and Alaska Native, 1.8% Asian, 0.0% Native Hawaiian and Pacific Islander, 5.3% from some other race, and 8.0% from two or more races. Hispanic or Latino residents of any race comprised 10.9% of the population.

60.6% of residents lived in urban areas, while 39.4% lived in rural areas.

There were 34,073 households in the county, of which 32.6% had children under the age of 18 living with them and 21.9% had a female householder with no spouse or partner present. About 21.8% of all households were made up of individuals and 10.4% had someone living alone who was 65 years of age or older.

There were 35,827 housing units, of which 4.9% were vacant. Among occupied housing units, 78.8% were owner-occupied and 21.2% were renter-occupied. The homeowner vacancy rate was 1.2% and the rental vacancy rate was 4.0%.

=== 2000 Census ===
As of the census of 2000, there were 59,209 people, 22,097 households, and 16,727 families residing in the county. The population density was 143 inhabitants per square mile (55/km^{2}). There were 23,319 housing units at an average density of 56 units per square mile (22 units/km^{2}). The racial makeup of the county was 94.99% White, 2.62% Black or African American, 0.16% Native American, 0.66% Asian, 0.02% Pacific Islander, 0.56% from other races, and 1.01% from two or more races. 1.70% of the population were Hispanic or Latino of any race.

There were 22,097 households, out of which 36.60% had children under the age of 18 living with them, 62.50% were married couples living together, 8.80% had a female householder with no husband present, and 24.30% were non-families. 19.20% of all households were made up of individuals, and 6.80% had someone living alone who was 65 years of age or older. The average household size was 2.64 and the average family size was 3.02.

In the county, the population was spread out, with 26.40% under the age of 18, 7.00% from 18 to 24, 31.90% from 25 to 44, 24.10% from 45 to 64, and 10.60% who were 65 years of age or older. The median age was 37 years. For every 100 females, there were 100.10 males. For every 100 females aged 18 and over, there were 96.70 males.

The median income for a household in the county was $46,941, and the median income for a family was $52,281. Males had a median income of $35,705 versus $25,046 for females. The per capita income for the county was $21,080. About 4.00% of families and 6.40% of the population were below the poverty line, including 7.30% of those under age 18 and 6.90% of those age 65 or over.

== Government ==
=== Board of Supervisors ===
- Chairman at Large: John Jewell. (R)
- Back Creek District: Dr. Albert Orndorff (I)
- Gainesboro District: Jason Aikens (R)
- Opequon District: Robert Wells (I)
- Red Bud District: Blaine P. Dunn (R)
- Shawnee District: Bob Liero (R)
- Stonewall District: Gary Oates (I)

=== Constitutional officers ===
- Clerk of the Circuit Court: Sarah J. Kahle (R)
- Commissioner of the Revenue: Tonya Sibert (R)
- Commonwealth's Attorney: Ross Spicer (R)
- Sheriff: Lenny Millholland (I)
- Treasurer: C. William Orndoff, Jr. (R)

Frederick is represented by Republican Timmy French (R), in the Virginia Senate, Bill Wiley (R), and Delores Riley Oates (R), in the Virginia House of Delegates, and Ben Cline (R) in the U.S. House of Representatives. The Republican Party has won the county's vote in every presidential election since 1968.

United States presidential election results for Frederick County, Virginia
Year	Republican		Democratic		Third party(ies)	
Year	No.	%	No.	%	No.	%
1912	181	14.66%	922	74.66%	132	10.69%
1916	366	23.15%	1,194	75.52%	21	1.33%
1920	875	39.13%	1,337	59.79%	24	1.07%
1924	484	26.49%	1,314	71.92%	29	1.59%
1928	1,006	46.88%	1,140	53.12%	0	0.00%
1932	456	22.62%	1,536	76.19%	24	1.19%
1936	665	32.31%	1,386	67.35%	7	0.34%
1940	773	32.13%	1,631	67.79%	2	0.08%
1944	938	43.51%	1,213	56.26%	5	0.23%
1948	921	38.31%	1,244	51.75%	239	9.94%
1952	1,803	57.53%	1,326	42.31%	5	0.16%
1956	1,882	56.01%	1,405	41.82%	73	2.17%
1960	2,061	53.74%	1,757	45.81%	17	0.44%
1964	2,585	47.22%	2,880	52.61%	9	0.16%
1968	3,696	49.58%	1,612	21.63%	2,146	28.79%
1972	5,367	75.18%	1,604	22.47%	168	2.35%
1976	5,162	59.52%	3,389	39.08%	121	1.40%
1980	7,293	67.61%	2,948	27.33%	546	5.06%
1984	9,542	77.79%	2,671	21.77%	54	0.44%
1988	9,921	72.33%	3,707	27.02%	89	0.65%
1992	9,425	53.96%	4,942	28.29%	3,101	17.75%
1996	10,608	57.61%	5,976	32.46%	1,828	9.93%
2000	14,574	65.09%	7,158	31.97%	660	2.95%
2004	19,386	67.93%	8,853	31.02%	301	1.05%
2008	20,149	59.95%	12,961	38.56%	502	1.49%
2012	22,858	62.81%	12,690	34.87%	846	2.32%
2016	26,083	64.50%	11,932	29.51%	2,425	6.00%
2020	30,558	62.74%	17,207	35.33%	938	1.93%
2024	33,117	63.37%	18,331	35.07%	815	1.56%

== Transportation ==
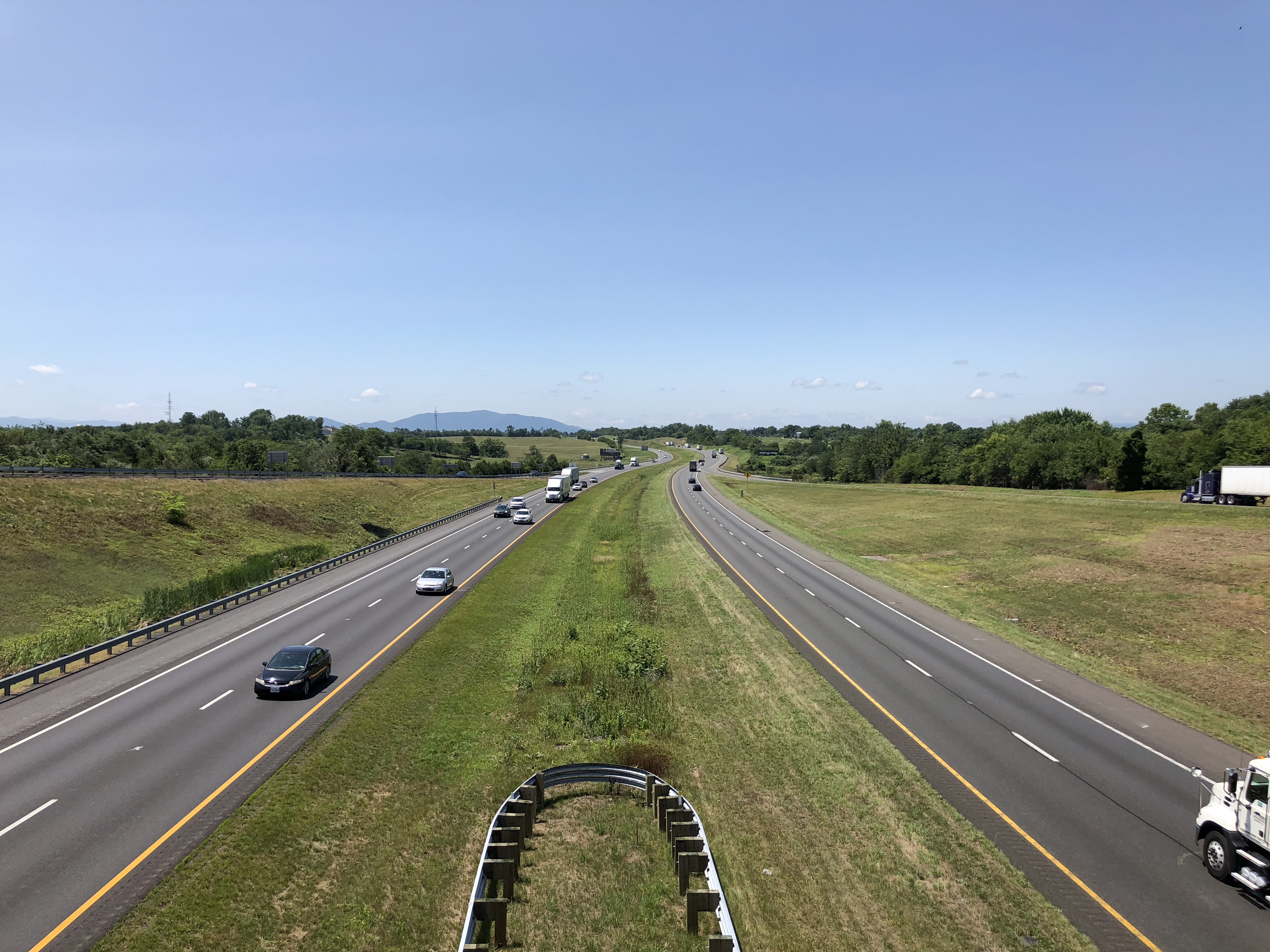
I-81 southbound in Frederick County, near Stephens City

- Winchester Transit provides weekday transit for the city of Winchester.

=== Major highways ===
- I-66
- I-81
- US 11
- US 17
- US 48
- US 50
- US 340
- US 522
- SR 7
- SR 37
- SR 55
- SR 127
- SR 259
- SR 277

== Education ==
Frederick County is served by Frederick County Public Schools, which includes several elementary, middle, and high schools. Frederick County is also part of the region served by the Mountain Vista Governor's School, which offers upper-level classes to intellectually gifted high school students.

=== Schools ===
==== Elementary schools ====
- Apple Pie Ridge Elementary School
- Armel Elementary School
- Bass-Hoover Elementary School
- Evendale Elementary School
- Gainesboro Elementary School
- Greenwood Mill Elementary School
- Indian Hollow Elementary School
- Jordan Springs Elementary School
- Middletown Elementary School
- Orchard View Elementary School
- Redbud Run Elementary School
- Stonewall Elementary School

==== Middle schools ====
- Admiral Richard E. Byrd Middle School
- Frederick County Middle School
- James Wood Middle School
- Robert E. Aylor Middle School

==== High schools ====
- James Wood High School
- Millbrook High School
- Sherando High School

=== Colleges ===
- Laurel Ridge Community College

=== Universities ===
- Shenandoah University

=== Libraries ===
- Handley Regional Library

== Communities ==
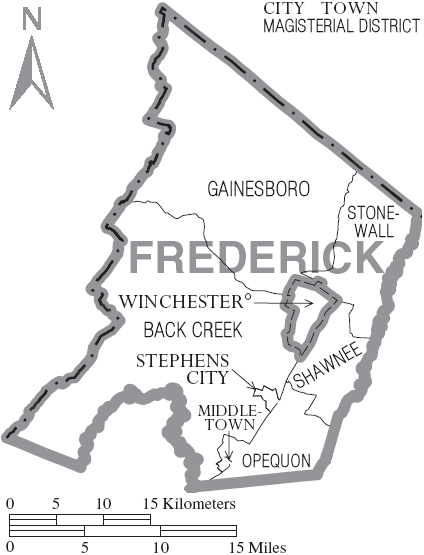
Map of Frederick County, Virginia, with Municipal and Magisterial District Labels

Although designated as the county seat, Winchester, like all cities under Virginia law, is an independent city, politically independent of any county.

=== Towns ===
- Middletown
- Stephens City

=== Census-designated places ===
- Brucetown
- Gore
- Lake Holiday
- Shawneeland

=== Other unincorporated communities ===
- Albin
- Armel
- Bartonsville
- Burnt Factory
- Canterburg
- Cedar Grove
- Cedar Hill
- Clear Brook
- Cross Junction
- De Haven
- Gainesboro
- Good
- Gravel Springs
- Greenwood
- Green Spring
- Grimes
- Hayfield
- Indian Hollow
- Jordan Springs
- Kernstown
- Lake Frederick
- Leetown
- Lehew
- Marlboro
- McQuire
- Meadow Mills
- Mill Race Estates
- Mount Pleasant
- Mount Williams
- Mountain Falls
- Mountain Falls Park
- Nain
- Opequon
- Parkins Mills
- Rest
- Reynolds Store
- Ridings Mill
- Rock Enon Springs
- Round Hill
- Shockeysville
- Siler
- Star Tannery
- Stephenson
- Vaucluse
- Welltown
- Whitacre
- White Hall
- Wilde Acres

== Notable people ==
- William McGuire (judge) (1765-1820), lawyer, first chief justice of the Mississippi Territory

== See also ==
- National Register of Historic Places listings in Frederick County, Virginia
- List of routes in Frederick County, Virginia
