= National Register of Historic Places listings in Frederick County, Virginia =

Location of Frederick County in Virginia

This is a list of the National Register of Historic Places listings in Frederick County, Virginia.

This is intended to be a complete list of the properties and districts on the National Register of Historic Places in Frederick County, Virginia, United States. The locations of National Register properties and districts for which the latitude and longitude coordinates are included below, may be seen in an online map.

There are 32 properties and districts listed on the National Register in the county, including 1 National Historic Landmark (the Cedar Creek Battlefield).

This National Park Service list is complete through NPS recent listings posted March 6, 2026.

== Current listings ==
	Name on the Register	Image	Date listed	Location	City or town	Description
1	Willa Cather Birthplace	Willa Cather Birthplace	November 16, 1978 (#78003017)	Northwest of Gore on U.S. Route 50; 39°16′04″N 78°19′26″W	Gore	
2	Cedar Creek and Belle Grove National Historical Park	Cedar Creek and Belle Grove National Historical Park	August 11, 1969 (#69000243)	On Interstate 81 between Middletown and Strasburg; 39°01′15″N 78°18′14″W	Middletown	Site of the Battle of Cedar Creek; designated a National Historic Landmark District in 1969. Extends into Warren County. Relisted with new name on December 19, 2002.
3	Cleridge	Cleridge	September 8, 2011 (#11000653)	1649 Old Charles Town Rd. 39°13′29″N 78°03′39″W	Stephenson	Extends into Clarke County
4	Crumley-Lynn-Lodge House	Crumley-Lynn-Lodge House	September 6, 2006 (#06000806)	3641 Apple Pie Ridge Rd. 39°18′09″N 78°08′32″W	White Hall	
5	Fort Collier	Fort Collier	April 28, 2006 (#06000356)	1 mile (1.6 km) mile north of Winchester on U.S. Route 11; 39°12′05″N 78°09′13″W	Winchester	
6	Fort Colvin	Fort Colvin	May 8, 2007 (#07000416)	104 Stonebrook Rd. 39°08′27″N 78°13′31″W	Winchester	
7	Frederick County Poor Farm	Frederick County Poor Farm	August 12, 1993 (#93000823)	Eastern side of Poorhouse Rd., south of its junction with Indian Hollow Rd. 39°12′44″N 78°13′24″W	Round Hill	
8	Gravel Springs Farm		August 14, 2025 (#100012136)	2074 S Pifer Road; 39°04′58″N 78°27′04″W	Star Tannery	
9	Green Spring Mill		October 8, 2024 (#100010899)	617 Green Spring Road; 39°18′04″N 78°09′40″W	Winchester	
10	High Banks	High Banks	March 1, 2011 (#11000066)	423 High Banks Rd. 39°12′22″N 78°04′13″W	Stephenson	
11	John Hite House	John Hite House	July 8, 1982 (#82004558)	U.S. Route 11; 39°06′35″N 78°12′14″W	Bartonsville	Oldest house in the county, built by Simon Taylor in 1753 for Col. John Hite, the son of Joist Hite.
12	Homespun	Homespun	December 31, 2002 (#02001671)	949 Cedar Creek Grade; 39°09′46″N 78°11′40″W	Winchester	
13	Hopewell Friends Meetinghouse	Hopewell Friends Meetinghouse	March 28, 1980 (#80004190)	West of Clear Brook off Hopewell Rd. 39°15′23″N 78°06′54″W	Clear Brook	
14	Kernstown Battlefield Historic District	Kernstown Battlefield Historic District	December 17, 2024 (#100011178)	610 Battle Park Drive; 39°08′37″N 78°11′42″W	Winchester	
15	Long Meadow	Long Meadow	July 27, 2005 (#05000769)	1946 Jones Rd. 39°09′02″N 78°13′47″W	Winchester	
16	Middletown Historic District	Middletown Historic District	June 23, 2003 (#03000566)	Bounded by Main St., Church St., Senseney Ave., and 1st, 4th, 6th, and 3rd Sts. 39°01′42″N 78°16′45″W	Middletown	
17	Millbank	Millbank	May 21, 2014 (#14000233)	3100 Berryville Pike; 39°10′45″N 78°04′37″W	Winchester	
18	Monte Vista	Monte Vista	November 16, 1987 (#87002018)	8100 U.S. Route 11; 39°01′13″N 78°17′20″W	Middletown	Built in 1883; also known as Cedar Grove Farm (1843-1919) or the Heater House, owned by Solomon and Caroline Wunder Heater, who lost two sons fighting for the Confederacy, even though she was a staunch Union sympathizer.
19	Newtown-Stephensburg Historic District	Newtown-Stephensburg Historic District	August 18, 1992 (#92001033)	Roughly Main St. from the town limits to Farm View Dr., and adjacent areas of Mulberry and German Sts. 39°05′02″N 78°13′06″W	Stephens City	
20	Old Forge Farm	Old Forge Farm	February 11, 2004 (#04000036)	7326 Middle Rd. 39°04′43″N 78°19′32″W	Middletown	First known as Stephen's Fort, built by Lewis Stephens, son of Peter Stephens, for protection during the French and Indian War. Sold in 1767 to Isaac Zane, whose Zane's Furnace (Marlboro Iron Works) was a major manufacturer of munitions for the Continental Army. Gristmill operations continued into the 1950s.
21	Old Stone Church	Old Stone Church	July 5, 2001 (#01000689)	Approximately 1 mile (1.6 km) west of the junction of Green Spring and Apple Pie Ridge Rds. 39°18′05″N 78°10′04″W	White Hall	
22	Opequon Historic District	Opequon Historic District	May 16, 2002 (#02000515)	Junction of Miller Rd. and Cedar Creek Grade; 39°09′28″N 78°14′50″W	Winchester	
23	Opequon Presbyterian Church	Opequon Presbyterian Church	February 16, 2001 (#01000145)	217 Opequon Church Ln. 39°08′22″N 78°11′43″W	Winchester	Organized and first built 1736, rebuilt 1790, restored 1870, burned down 1873, rebuilt 1897, manse added 1902.
24	Rock Hill	Rock Hill	March 18, 2019 (#100003540)	199 Gold's Hill Rd. 39°13′57″N 78°10′55″W	Winchester	
25	Rose Hill Farm	Rose Hill Farm	February 21, 1997 (#97000149)	1985 Jones Rd. 39°09′05″N 78°13′13″W	Winchester	
26	St. Thomas Chapel	St. Thomas Chapel	April 11, 1973 (#73002015)	Junction of 2nd and Church Sts. 39°01′40″N 78°16′39″W	Middletown	
27	Springdale	Springdale	November 22, 2016 (#16000797)	1663 Apple Pie Ridge Rd. 39°15′26″N 78°10′53″W	Winchester	
28	Springdale Mill Complex	Springdale Mill Complex	July 8, 1982 (#82004559)	U.S. Route 11; 39°06′36″N 78°12′21″W	Bartonsville	Limestone flour mill on Opequon Creek built in 1788.
29	Sunrise	Sunrise	February 8, 1995 (#95000021)	975 Hollow Rd. 39°15′54″N 78°22′27″W	Gore	
30	Thorndale Farm	Thorndale Farm	August 15, 2016 (#16000528)	652 N. Buckton Rd. 39°01′56″N 78°15′31″W	Middletown	
31	Valley Mill Farm	Valley Mill Farm	February 9, 2006 (#06000032)	1494 Valley Mill Rd. 39°10′46″N 78°05′10″W	Winchester	
32	Willow Shade	Willow Shade	December 18, 1990 (#90001925)	Junction of U.S. Route 50 and Stony Hill Rd. 39°16′07″N 78°18′29″W	Winchester	

== See also ==
- List of National Historic Landmarks in Virginia
- National Register of Historic Places listings in Virginia
- National Register of Historic Places listings in Winchester, Virginia
