= Springdale (Frederick County, Virginia) =

Historic house in Virginia, United States

- U.S. National Register of Historic Places
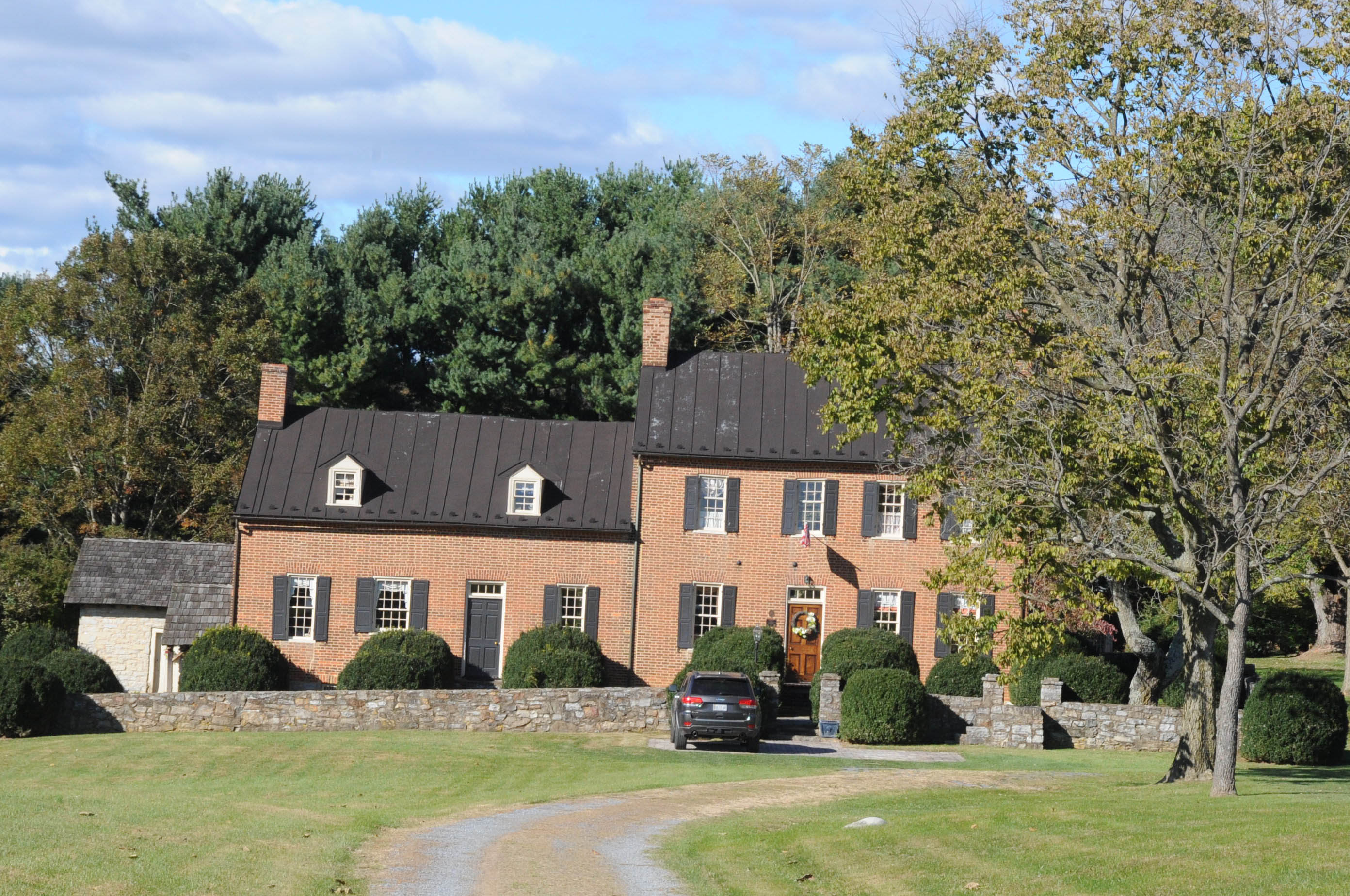
- Farmhouse facade

- Location within Virginia Location within the United States
- Location: 1663 Apple Pie Ridge Rd., near Winchester, Virginia
- Coordinates: 39°15′26″N 78°10′53″W
- Area: 4.5 acres (1.8 ha)
- Built: 1807
- Architectural style: Federal
- NRHP reference No.: 16000797
- Added to NRHP: November 22, 2016

Springdale is a historic farm property at 1663 Apple Pie Ridge Road in rural northern Frederick County, Virginia. The roughly 4.5-acre (1.8 ha) property includes a well-preserved brick Federal-style farmhouse built in 1820, and a number of later outbuildings. It includes two stone outbuildings, a springhouse and smokehouse, that predate the house by about 13 years. The property was owned and farmed by the Lupton family for more than 150 years.

The property was listed on the National Register of Historic Places in 2016.

== See also ==
- National Register of Historic Places listings in Frederick County, Virginia
