= High Banks =

Historic home and farm in Frederick County, Virginia, USA

- U.S. National Register of Historic Places
- Virginia Landmarks Register
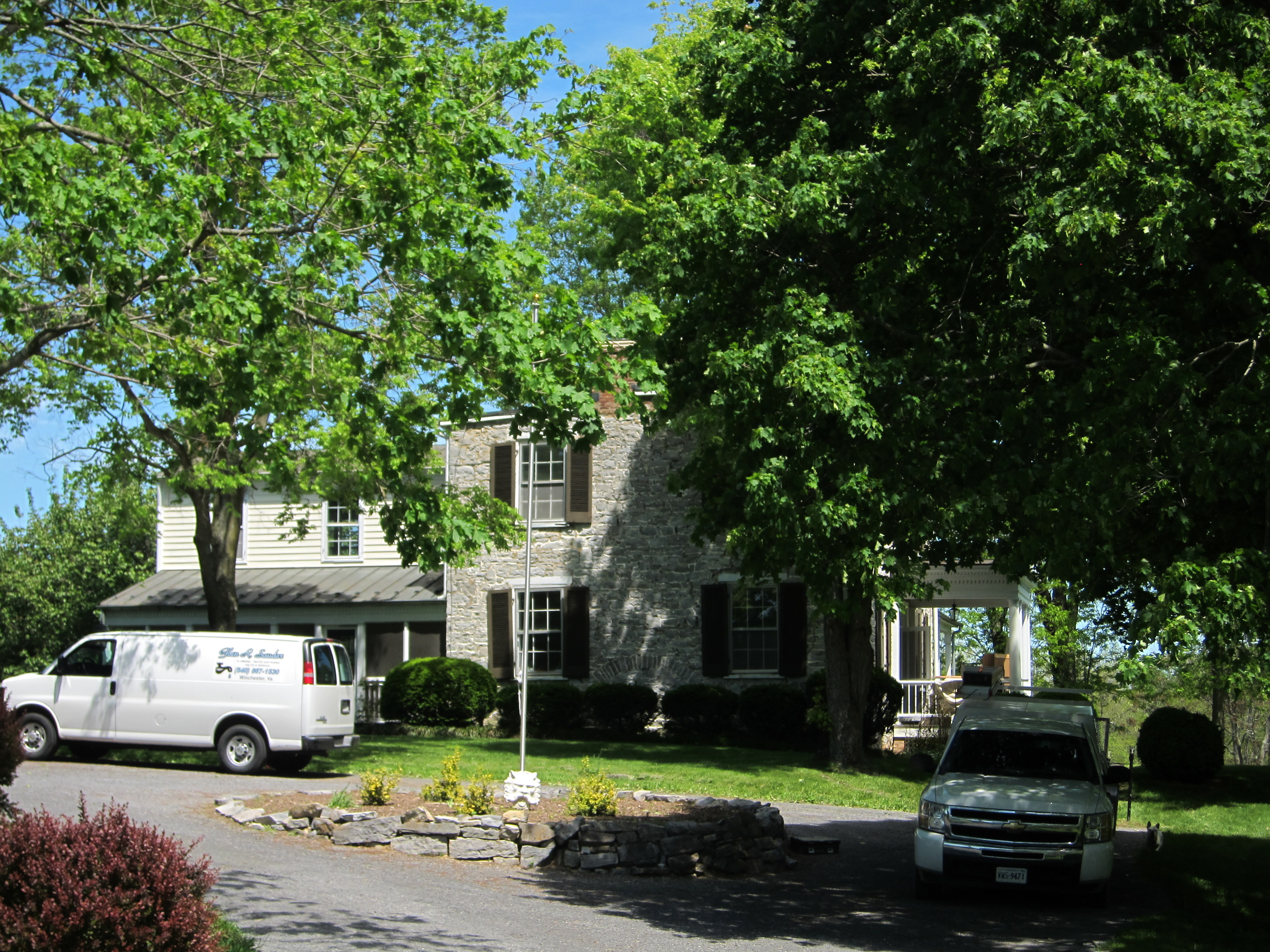

- Location within Virginia Location within the United States
- Location: 423 High Banks Rd., near Stephenson, Virginia
- Coordinates: 39°12′22″N 78°04′12″W
- Area: 70 acres (28 ha)
- Built: c. 1753 c. 1858; 1920; 1944
- Built by: Thomas Helm; James D. Stillwell
- Architectural style: late Greek Revival
- NRHP reference No.: 11000066
- VLR No.: 034-0109

Significant dates
- Added to NRHP: March 1, 2011
- Designated VLR: December 16, 2010

High Banks, also known as the Helm-Clevenger House, is a historic home and farm located near Stephenson, Frederick County, Virginia, US. It has a one-story, two-bay by three-bay frame addition and a frame rear wing. The front porch and interior features detailing in the late Greek Revival were added about 1858. Also on the property are a contributing foundation and partial wall of a post-Civil War bank barn and an 18th-century icehouse pit, both made of stone.

It was listed on the National Register of Historic Places in 2011.

== See also ==
- National Register of Historic Places listings in Frederick County, Virginia
