= Thorndale Farm =

Historic house in Virginia, United States

- U.S. National Register of Historic Places
- U.S. Historic district
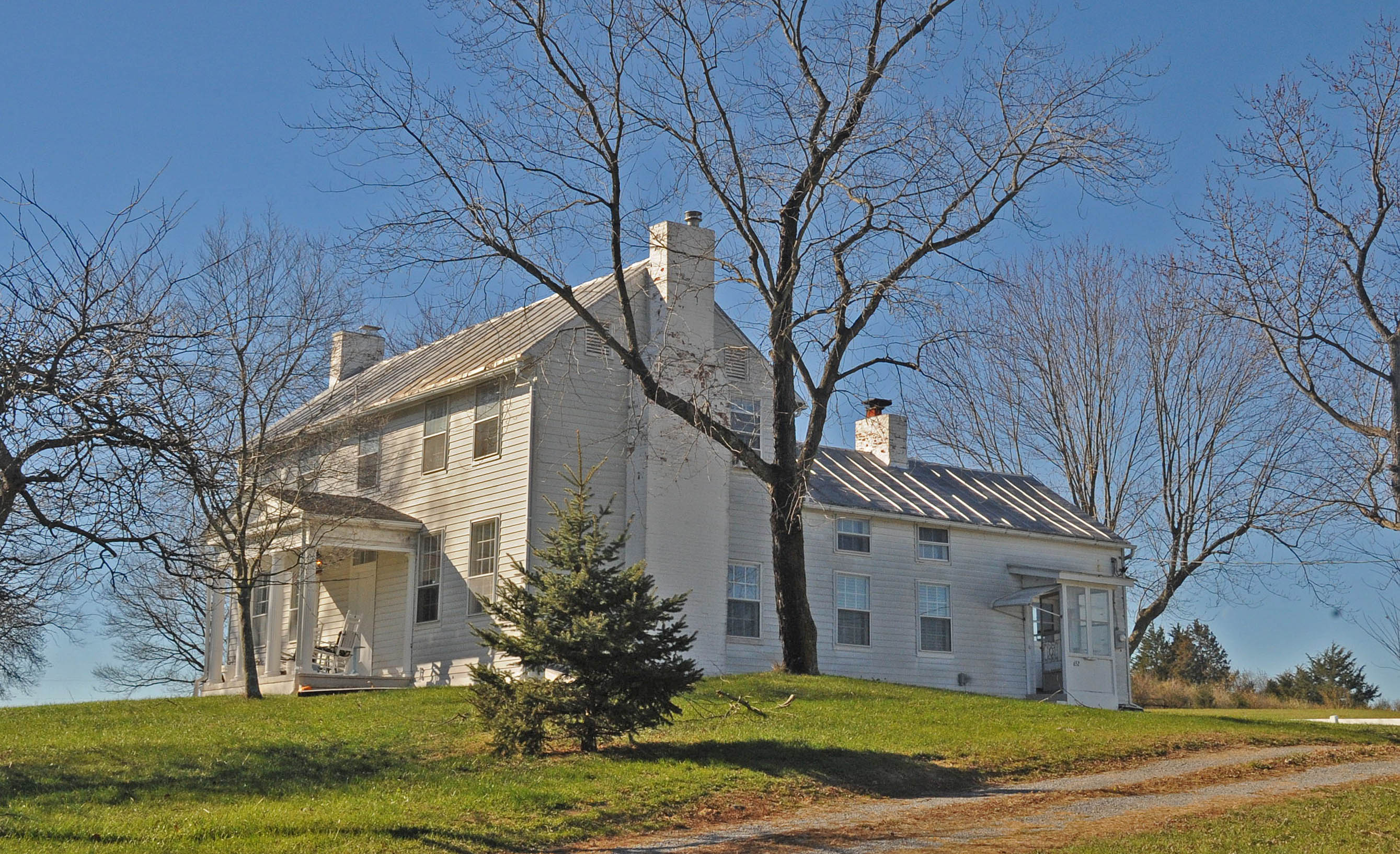
- The main house

- Location within Virginia Location within the United States
- Location: 652 N. Buckton Rd., near Middletown, Virginia
- Coordinates: 39°1′56″N 78°15′31″W
- Area: 41.4 acres (16.8 ha)
- Built: 1790
- Architectural style: Federal; Greek Revival
- NRHP reference No.: 16000528
- Added to NRHP: August 15, 2016

Thorndale Farm is a historic farm property at 652 North Buckton Road, in rural Frederick County, Virginia east of Middletown. The property, over 41 acres (17 ha) in size, includes a wood-frame farmhouse built about 1790 and enlarged and restyled in the Greek Revival about 1855, as well as a later 19th-century barn and a c. 1840 meathouse. It was originally part of a much larger land grant made to John Larrock, a militia captain the American Revolutionary War. Part of the farm was involved in the 1864 Battle of Cedar Creek in the American Civil War.

The property was listed on the National Register of Historic Places in 2016.

== See also ==
- National Register of Historic Places listings in Frederick County, Virginia
