= Millbank (Winchester, Virginia) =

Historic house in Virginia, United States

- U.S. National Register of Historic Places
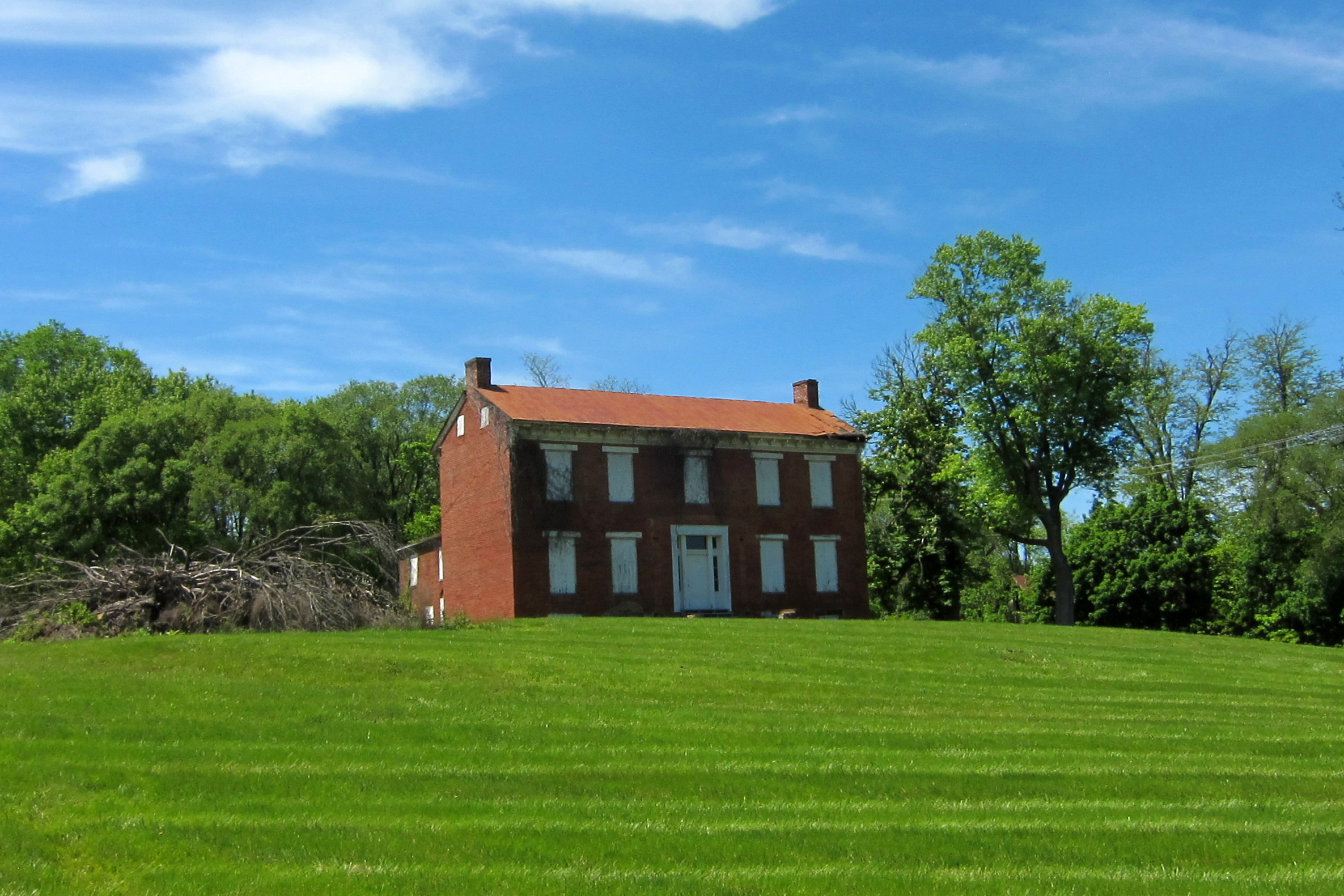

- Location within Virginia Location within the United States
- Location: 3100 Berryville Pike, near Winchester, Virginia
- Coordinates: 39°10′45″N 78°04′38″W
- Area: 3 acres (1.2 ha)
- Built: 1850
- Architectural style: Greek Revival
- NRHP reference No.: 14000233
- Added to NRHP: May 21, 2014

Millbank, also known as Spout Spring and Hillwood, is a historic house at 3100 Berryville Pike, in Frederick County, Virginia east of the city of Winchester. The two story brick mansion was built c. 1850 by Isaac and Daniel T. Wood. It is one of the largest Greek Revival houses in the county, standing on a hill overlooking Berryville Pike and Opequon Creek, which flows east of the property. The house (vacant in 2014) has a typical I-house plan, with two entrances, one facing the highway and one the creek. Both were originally sheltered by Doric-columned porches, but the side entry's porch has been removed by vandals. The house was previously owned by the Winchester-Frederick Service Authority, who took the property in 1984 by eminent domain to construct the adjacent sewage treatment plant. It is now owned by The Fort Collier Civil War Center, Inc. (2014.) This nonprofit organization owns historic Fort Collier, another Third Battle of Winchester site.

The house has a documented association with the American Civil War. The nearby crossing of Opequon Creek was at that time a ford, and it was in this area that the Third Battle of Winchester raged. Millbank is documented as having been the site of a Union Army field hospital during the battle.

The house was listed on the National Register of Historic Places in 2014.

== See also ==
- National Register of Historic Places listings in Frederick County, Virginia
