= Valley Mill Farm =

Historic house in Virginia, United States

- U.S. National Register of Historic Places
- Virginia Landmarks Register
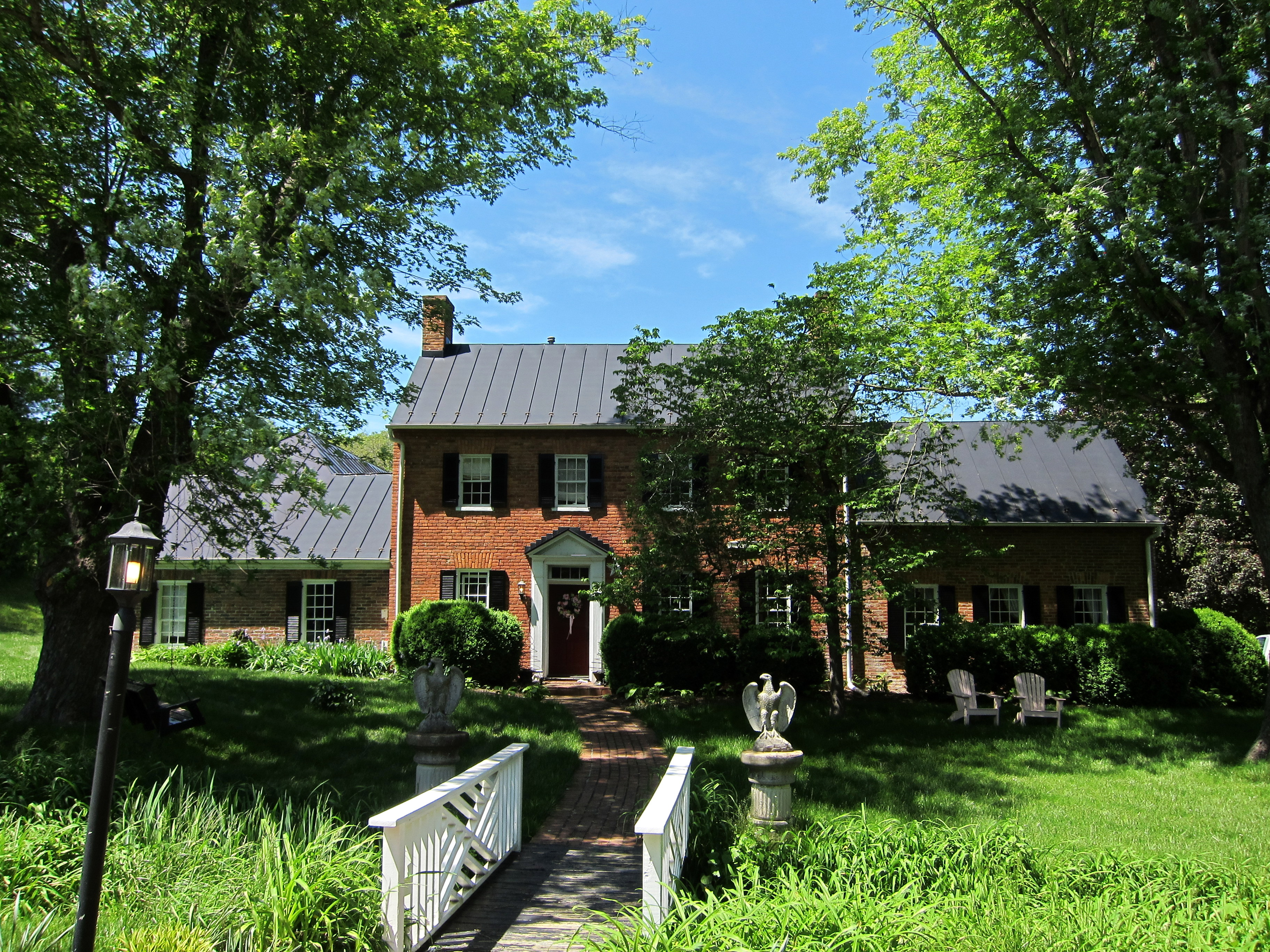
- Valley Mill Farm in 2016

- Location within Virginia Location within the United States
- Location: 1494 Valley Mill Rd., near Winchester, Virginia
- Coordinates: 39°10′41″N 78°05′19″W
- Area: 85.2 acres (34.5 ha)
- Built: c. 1820
- Built by: Helm, William
- Architectural style: Federal
- NRHP reference No.: 06000032
- VLR No.: 034-0108

Significant dates
- Added to NRHP: February 9, 2006
- Designated VLR: December 7, 2005

Valley Mill Farm, also known as Eddy's Mill, William Helm House, and Helm/Eddy House, is a historic home and farm located near Winchester, Frederick County, Virginia, USA. The house was built about 1820, and is a two-story, four-bay, Federal style dwelling with a gable roof. It has a 1 1/2-story wing dated to the mid-19th century. Also on the property are a contributing former two-story mill (c. 1820, now veterinary office), a frame two-story tenant house (c. 1890), a storage shed, and the ruins of two small, unidentified buildings.

It was listed on the National Register of Historic Places in 2006.

== See also ==
- National Register of Historic Places listings in Frederick County, Virginia
