= Fort Colvin =

- U.S. National Register of Historic Places
- Virginia Landmarks Register
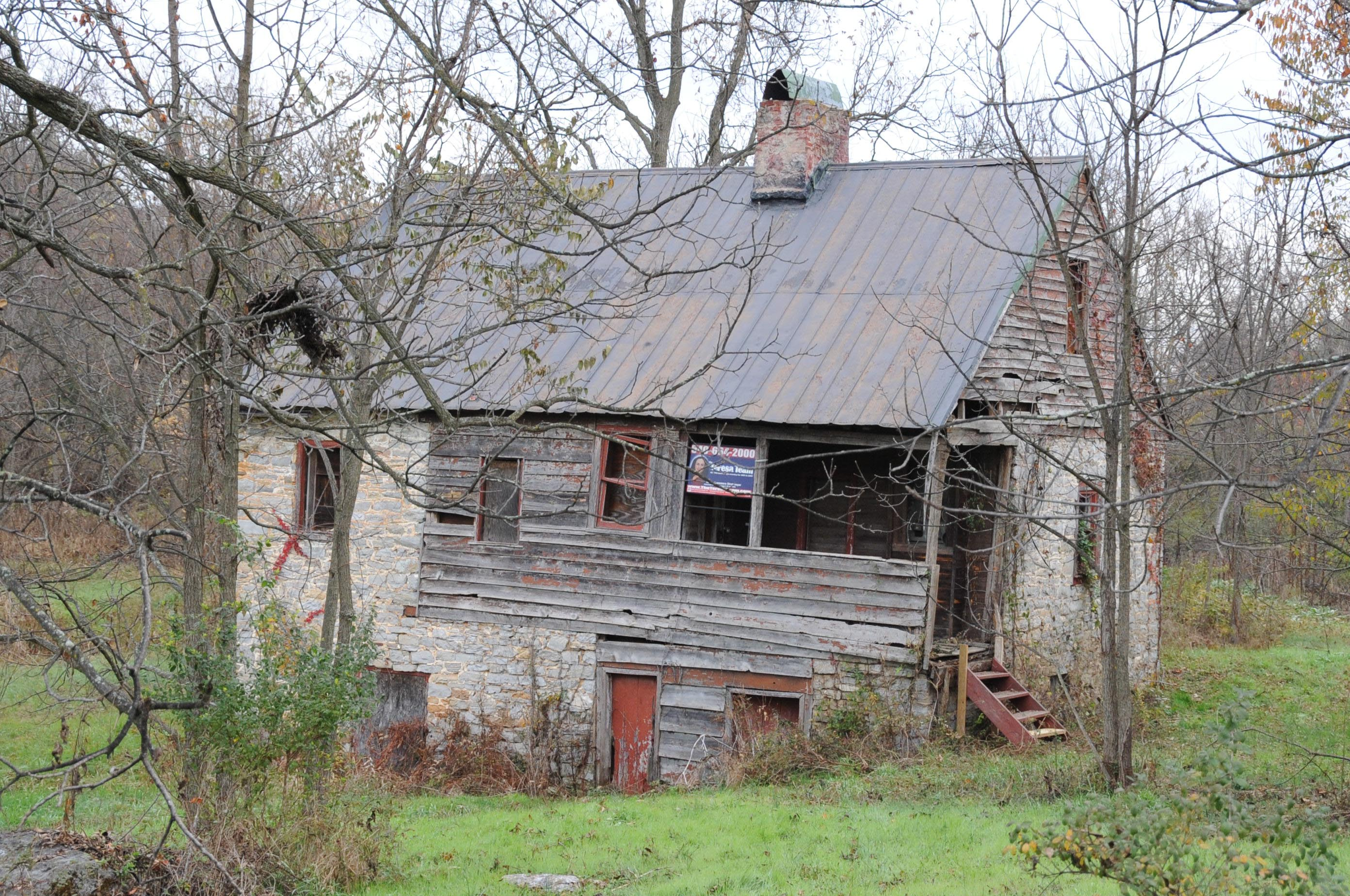

- Location within Virginia Location within the United States
- Location: 104 Stonebrook Rd., near Winchester, Virginia
- Coordinates: 39°8′26″N 78°13′31″W
- Area: 2 acres (0.81 ha)
- Built: 1750
- Architectural style: Colonial
- NRHP reference No.: 07000416
- VLR No.: 034-0026

Significant dates
- Added to NRHP: May 8, 2007
- Designated VLR: March 7, 2007

Fort Colvin, also known as Covill's Fort and Colvin House, is a historic home located near Winchester, Frederick County, Virginia. It was built about 1750, and is a 1 1/2-story, stone and frame building with a metal gable roof and interior chimney. It measures 24 feet by 34 feet and is nearly centrally positioned over a spring. Also on the property are a contributing site of a small domestic outbuilding and the ruins of a small footbridge. Fort Colvin is believed to have been built by some of the first European settlers in the first multi-ethnic community west of the Blue Ridge Mountains in Virginia. It is thought to have been used as a settler's fort by Joseph Colvill in 1755.

It was listed on the National Register of Historic Places in 2007.
