= Rose Hill Farm (Winchester, Virginia) =

Historic house in Virginia, United States

- U.S. National Register of Historic Places
- Virginia Landmarks Register
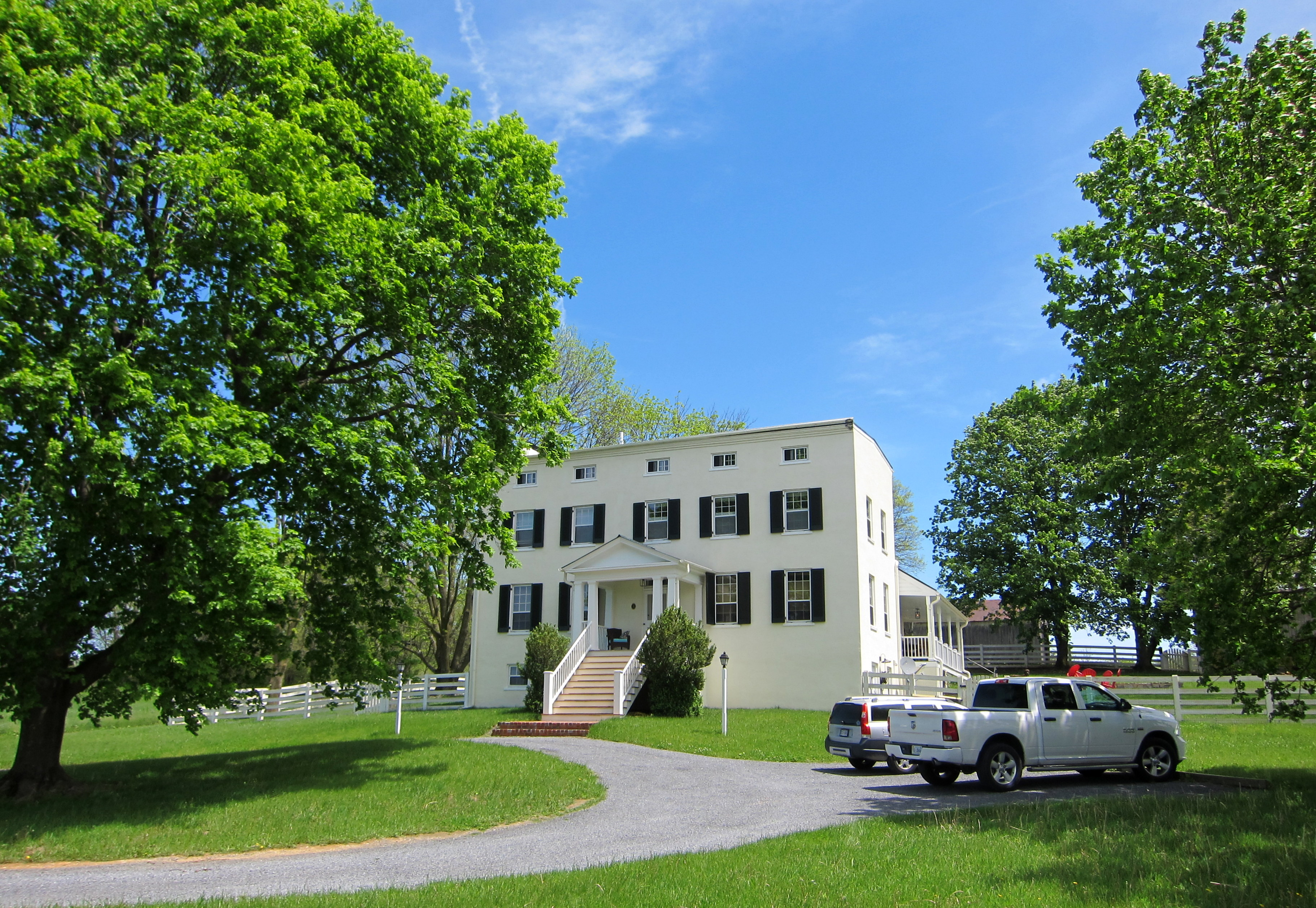

- Location within Virginia Location within the United States
- Location: 1985 Jones Rd., near Winchester, Virginia
- Coordinates: 39°9′00″N 78°12′59″W
- Area: 300 acres (120 ha)
- Built: c. 1797, c. 1819, c. 1850
- Architectural style: Federal, Greek Revival
- NRHP reference No.: 97000149
- VLR No.: 034-0115

Significant dates
- Added to NRHP: February 21, 1997
- Designated VLR: June 19, 1996

Rose Hill Farm is a historic home and farm located near Winchester, Frederick County, Virginia. It is a vernacular Federal style, 2 1/2-story brick and stucco structure built about 1819. The earliest section was built about 1797, and began as a three-room-plan, 1 1/2-story, log structure built upon a limestone foundation. About 1850, the house was enhanced with vernacular Greek Revival-style elements. Also on the property are a contributing summer kitchen (c. 1862), cistern (date unknown), corn crib (date unknown), and barn (c.1850–1860).

It was listed on the National Register of Historic Places in 1997.
