= Opequon Historic District =

Historic district in Virginia, United States

- U.S. National Register of Historic Places
- U.S. Historic district
- Virginia Landmarks Register
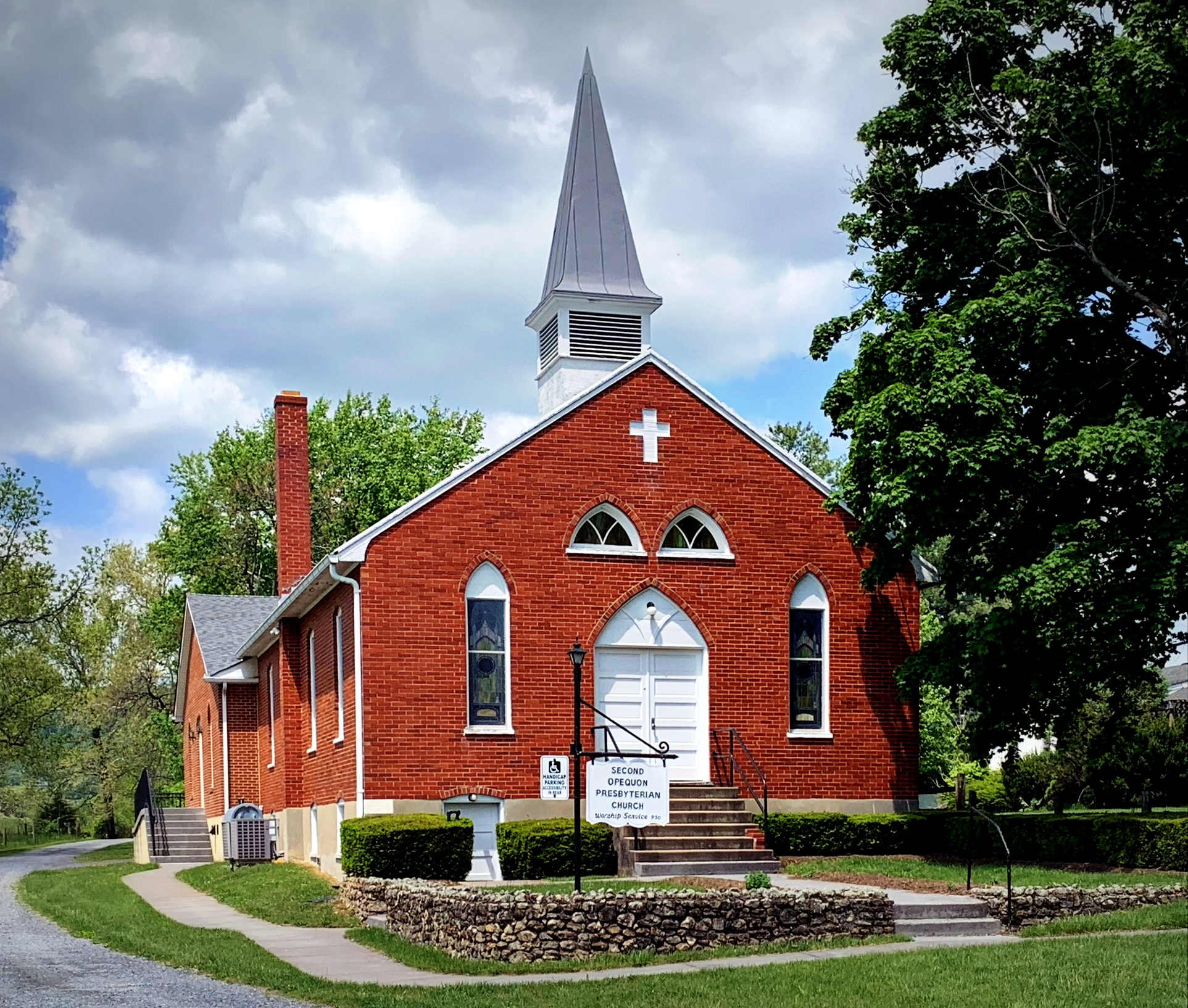
- Second Opequon Presbyterian Church in 2023

- Location within Virginia Location within the United States
- Location: Jct. of VA 622 and VA 620, near Winchester, Virginia
- Coordinates: 39°9′26″N 78°14′50″W
- Area: 94 acres (38 ha)
- Built: 1736
- Architectural style: Colonial, Federal
- NRHP reference No.: 02000515
- VLR No.: 034-5037

Significant dates
- Added to NRHP: May 16, 2002
- Designated VLR: December 5, 2001

Opequon Historic District is a national historic district located in Opequon near Winchester, Frederick County, Virginia. It encompasses 33 contributing buildings and 1 contributing site in the village of Opequon. Notable buildings include Race Mills (ca. 1751, ca. 1812 additions, 1950s restoration) the oldest surviving building in the village, the Glass-Rinker-Cooper Mill (c. 1812), Greenwood, The Millhouse (1738 or 1756), Homespun (1771), the Hodgson (Bayliss) Store (late 1800s), The Second Opequon Presbyterian Church (1939), Tokes' Inn (late 1800s), and Bleak House (Bageant House).

It was listed on the National Register of Historic Places in 2002.
