= Stephenson, Virginia =

Unincorporated community in Virginia, United States

- Unincorporated community
- Location within Virginia Location within the United States
- Coordinates: 39°14′14″N 78°6′23″W
- Country: United States
- State: Virginia
- County: Frederick
- Elevation: 554 ft (169 m)
- Time zone: UTC−5 (Eastern (EST))
  - Summer (DST): UTC−4 (EDT)
- ZIP code: 22656
- Area code: 540
- GNIS feature ID: 1740338

Stephenson is an unincorporated community in Frederick County, Virginia, United States. Stephenson is located on U.S. Route 11 north of Winchester.

High Banks, a historic home and farm dating from the mid-18th century, was listed on the National Register of Historic Places in 2011.
