= VHSL Group 4A North Region =

High school athletic division in Virginia, USA

The Group 4A North Region is a division of the Virginia High School League. The region was formed in 2013 when the VHSL adopted a six classification format and eliminated the previous three classification system. For the purpose of regular season competition, schools may compete within districts that existed prior to 2013. The division is composed of 28 schools separated into four conferences 21A, 21B, 22,23, and 24. This format is mainly for regular season competition and schools are not limited to these classifications.

== Conferences for 2017-2018 ==
=== Conference 21A ===
- Sherando High School of Stephens City, Virginia
- Woodgrove High School of Purcellville, Virginia
- Millbrook High School of Frederick County, Virginia
- James Wood High School of Winchester, Virginia
- Harrisonburg High School of Harrisonburg, Virginia
- John Handley High School of Winchester, Virginia

=== Conference 21B ===
- Heritage High School of Leesburg, Virginia
- Dominion High School of Sterling, Virginia
- Park View High School of Sterling, Virginia
- Loudoun County High School of Leesburg, Virginia
- Loudoun Valley High School of Purcellville, Virginia
- Rock Ridge High School of Ashburn, Virginia

=== Conference 22 ===
- Kettle Run High School of Nokesville, Virginia
- Fauquier High School of Fauquier, Virginia
- Liberty High School of Bealeton, Virginia
- John Champe High School of Aldie, Virginia
- Freedom High School of South Riding, Virginia

=== Conference 23 ===
- Charlottesville High School of Charlottesville, Virginia
- E. C. Glass High School of Lynchburg, Virginia
- Louisa County High School of Mineral, Virginia
- Amherst County High School of Amherst, Virginia
- Jefferson Forest High School of Bedford County, Virginia
- George Washington High school of Danville, Virginia

=== Conference 24 ===
- Pulaski County High School of Dublin, Virginia
- Salem High School of Salem, Virginia
- Carroll County High School of Hillsville, Virginia
- Bassett High School of Bassett, Virginia
- William Fleming High School of Roanoke, Virginia
- William Byrd High School of Roanoke County, Virginia
