= John Handley High School =

Public high school in Virginia, US

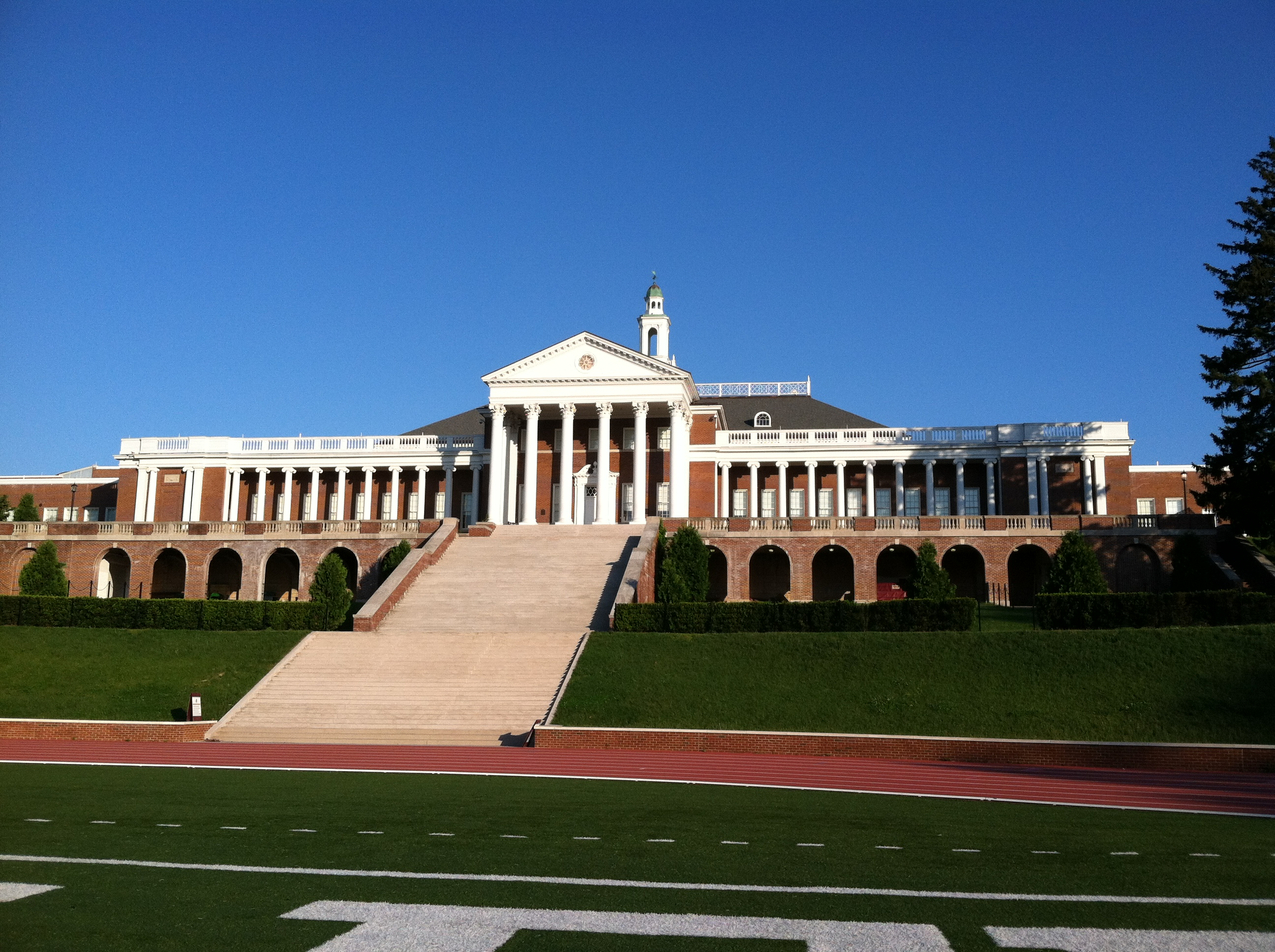

Location
- 425 Handley Boulevard; Winchester, Virginia 22601; United States

Information
- School type: Endowed Public, high school
- Founded: 1923; 103 years ago
- School district: Winchester Public Schools
- Superintendent: Jason Van Heukelum
- Principal: Susan Braithwaite
- Teaching staff: 106.97 (FTE) (2018–19)
- Grades: 9–12
- Enrollment: 1,343 (2021–22)
- Student to teacher ratio: 12.55:1 (2021–22)
- Colors: Maroon, White
- Athletics conference: VHSL Group 4A North Region-Conference 21A
- Mascot: Judges
- Rival: James Wood Colonels; Sherando Warriors; Millbrook Pioneers; Skyline Hawks; Woodgrove Wolverines
- Yearbook: The Handlian
- Website: jhhs.wps.k12.va.us
- John Handley High School
- U.S. National Register of Historic Places
- Virginia Landmarks Register
- Location within Virginia Location within the United States
- Location: 425 Handley Blvd., Winchester, Virginia
- Coordinates: 39°10′40″N 78°10′34″W
- Area: 40 acres (16 ha)
- Built: 1921
- Architect: McCornack, W.R.; Olmsted Brothers
- Architectural style: Classical Revival
- NRHP reference No.: 98001070
- VLR No.: 138-5001

Significant dates
- Added to NRHP: August 14, 1998
- Designated VLR: June 17, 1998

John Handley High School (usually referred to as JHHS) is an endowed public high school located in the city of Winchester, Virginia. It is a part of Winchester Public Schools.

It was founded by a grant from Judge John Handley, hence the school mascot, the Judges. Construction on John Handley High School started in 1922, and continues to the present day. Recently, the school completed the final phase of its multimillion-dollar renovation with the addition of an 8-lane track and a turf football field. The school is planning renovations to its tennis courts in the upcoming years, due in part to the girls' three-peat state champions. In 1998, Handley was placed on the list of the National Register of Historic Places "for its local historic significance as well as its prominence as an architectural landmark."

== Academics ==
Handley has many Advanced Placement (AP) classes: AP World History, AP US History, AP Government & Politics, AP Physics C: Mechanics, AP Physics C: Electricity and Magnetism, AP Biology, AP Chemistry, AP Environmental Science, AP French Language, AP German Language, AP Spanish Language, AP Spanish Literature, AP Latin, AP English Language, AP English Literature, AP Statistics, AP Calculus AB, and AP Calculus BC.

In addition to the many AP classes, John Handley High School is one of the participating schools in the Mountain Vista Governor's School Program.

== Athletics ==
Handley supports a winning athletics department. The Boys' Outdoor Track Team has a tradition of excellent runners, winning a VHSL-record seven titles from 1935 to 1941. Since 1948, John Handley High School has won a VHSL-record eight boys' titles, its last Group AA championship coming in 1993.

The 1999 Baseball team won the program's 1st and only state title with a 25–1 record. The baseball program had a two-year record of 46-4 during 1999 and 2000 seasons.

The Girls' Tennis Team is now a three-peat state championship team, placing first in VA AA state in 2007, 2008, and now 2009.

In 2009, the Boys' Basketball team finished as Regional II Champions. In 2018 the team finished as state runners-up; in 2026, the basketball team won its first state championship in school history.

The 2009–10 football team beat Kettle Run 31–0 in their homecoming game in October 2009. The school boasts two State Football Championships in 1984 and 1994 and one additional State Championship appearance in 1999. The 2009–10 Handley football team went 12–1 for their whole season ending at the state semifinal in 2009, losing to Bruton High School 10–7 after two missed field goal attempts.

The 2010 Boys' Varsity Soccer finished undefeated in the Northwestern District, and place first in the District championship, but loss in the first round of Regional play to Potomac Falls by the score of 2–1.

The Boys’ Tennis Team finished undefeated and won state titles in 2016 and 2019, both led by John Henry Herrington, the only player in program history to win as a freshman and again as a senior.

== Mentions in the media ==
- In September 2017, Architectural Digest named Handley the most beautiful public high school in Virginia
- In April 2018, BuzzFeed wrote an article that mentioned JHHS as well as the Winchester Public School System. The article detailed the inaction that has taken place at Handley in reference to protecting students who are victims of sexual assault.
- In June 2018, The Washington Post wrote an article detailing how one student was abducted and sexually assaulted. Despite a judge finding her assailant guilty in court and issuing a no contact resolution, the school still required them to attend school together.

== Notable alumni ==
- Lang Campbell - NFL Europe and Arena Football League quarterback
- Patsy Cline - country music singer
- John Gilkerson - Carolina RailHawks FC defender, former New York Red Bull
- Jon Huertas - actor on Castle (TV series)
- Brian Partlow - Arena Football League offensive coordinator of AFL's Cleveland Gladiators, formerly with Austin Wranglers and 2005 AFL champion Colorado Crush
- Russ Potts - Legendary sports promoter, athletic director at Southern Methodist University, vice president of the Chicago White Sox and Senator in the Virginia Senate

== See also ==
- Shenandoah Apple Blossom Festival
- Winchester Public Schools
- List of high schools in Virginia
