= Frederick County Public Schools (Virginia) =

School System in Frederick County, Virginia

Frederick County Public Schools is the operating public school system within Frederick County, Virginia. It is governed by the seven-member Frederick County School Board. The district operates 24 school sites, including 12 elementary schools, 4 middle schools, 3 high schools, and a career and technical education center. George C. Hummer serves as the superintendent. Administrative offices are located in Winchester.

== High schools ==
- James Wood High School, Winchester
- Millbrook High School, Winchester
- Sherando High School, Stephens City

Mountain Vista Governor's School also serves the county and students may apply to take courses via an application process and selection.

== Middle schools ==
- Admiral Richard E. Byrd, Winchester
- Frederick County Middle School, Winchester
- James Wood Middle School, Winchester
- Robert E. Aylor Middle School, White Post (formerly located in Stephens City)

== Elementary schools ==
- Apple Pie Ridge, Winchester
- Armel, Winchester
- Bass-Hoover, Stephens City
- Evendale, Winchester
- Gainesboro, Gainesboro
- Greenwood Mill, Winchester
- Indian Hollow, Winchester
- Jordan Springs, Stephenson
- Middletown, Winchester
- Orchard View, Winchester
- Redbud Run, Winchester
- Stonewall, Clear Brook

== Other ==
- Dowell J Howard Center, Winchester
- Northwestern Regional Education Programs, Winchester
- Parent Resource Center, Winchester
- Northern Shenandoah Valley Adult Education, Winchester
- Senseny Road School, Winchester

== See also ==
- Winchester Public Schools
