= Virginia State Route 277 =

State highway in Virginia, United States

State Route 277
- Fairfax Pike; Fairfax Street

Route information
- Maintained by VDOT
- Length: 4.72 mi (7.60 km)
- Existed: 1933–present

Major junctions
- West end: US 11 / SR 631 in Stephens City
- I-81 in Stephens City
- East end: US 340 / US 522 at Double Tollgate

Location
- Country: United States
- State: Virginia
- Counties: Frederick, Clarke

Highway system
- Virginia Routes; Interstate; US; Primary; Secondary; Byways; History; HOT lanes
← SR 276	→ SR 278

State Route 277 (SR 277) is a primary state highway in the U.S. state of Virginia. Known also as Fairfax Pike and Fairfax Street, the state highway runs 4.72 miles (7.60 km) from U.S. Route 11 and SR 631 in Stephens City in southern Frederick County east to US 522 and US 340 at Double Tollgate in the southwestern corner of Clarke County.

== Route description ==
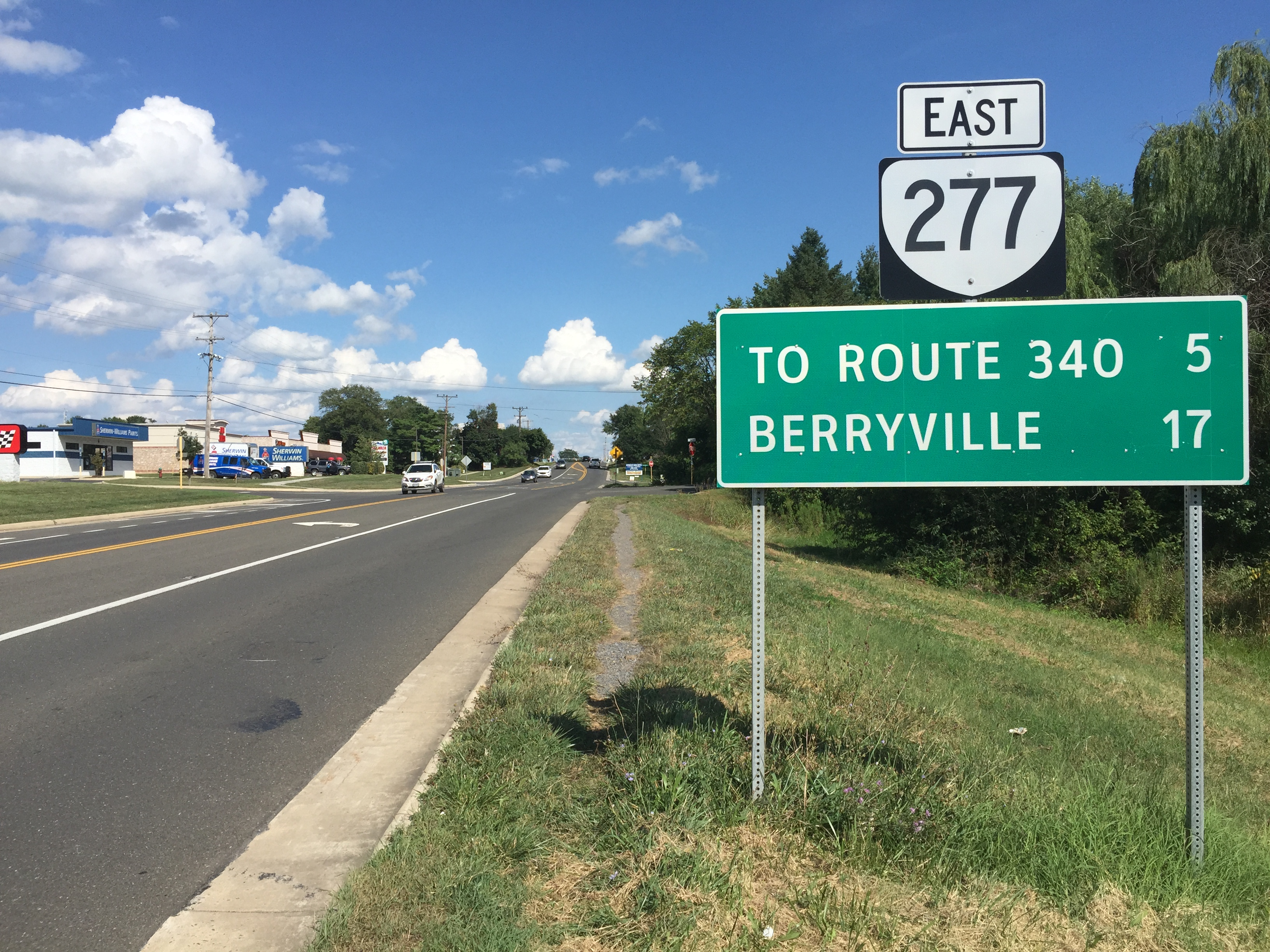
View east along SR 277 just east of Stephens City

SR 277 begins at an intersection with US 11 (Main Street) in the town of Stephens City. SR 631 (Fairfax Street) continues west from the intersection through the Newtown-Stephensburg Historic District and out of town toward the village of Marlboro. SR 277 heads east as a two-lane undivided road, leaving the town limits just west of a diamond interchange with Interstate 81. The state highway passes between residential subdivisions and passes to the north of Sherando High School before entering farmland. SR 277 follows the height of land between Wrights Run, which feeds Opequon Creek, to the north and Crooked Run, which is impounded to form Lake Frederick and flows south into the Shenandoah River at Front Royal. SR 277 reaches its eastern terminus immediately to the east of the Frederick–Clarke county line at an intersection with US 522 and US 340. US 522 heads north as Front Royal Pike toward Winchester, US 340 heads east and then north as Lord Fairfax Highway toward Berryville, and US 522 and US 340 join in a concurrency as Winchester Road south toward Front Royal.

== Future ==
Current plans are to build a new "South Frederick Parkway" about 1/2 mile (0.80 km) south of the current location of SR 277, having it begin south of its current terminus in Stephens City near the Drake's Family Drive In. At the east end, it will tie into current SR 277 about 1/2 mile (0.80 km) west of Double Tollgate.

== Major intersections ==
County	Location	mi	km	Destinations	Notes
Frederick	Stephens City	0.00	0.00	US 11 (Main Street) / SR 631 (Fairfax Street)	Western terminus
Frederick		0.23	0.37	I-81 – Winchester, Roanoke	Exit 307 (I-81)
Clarke	Double Tollgate	4.72	7.60	US 340 / US 522 (Lord Fairfax Highway / Stonewall Jackson Highway) – Berryville, Winchester, Front Royal	Eastern terminus
1.000 mi = 1.609 km; 1.000 km = 0.621 mi
