= Dennis Haley =

American gridiron football player (born 1982)

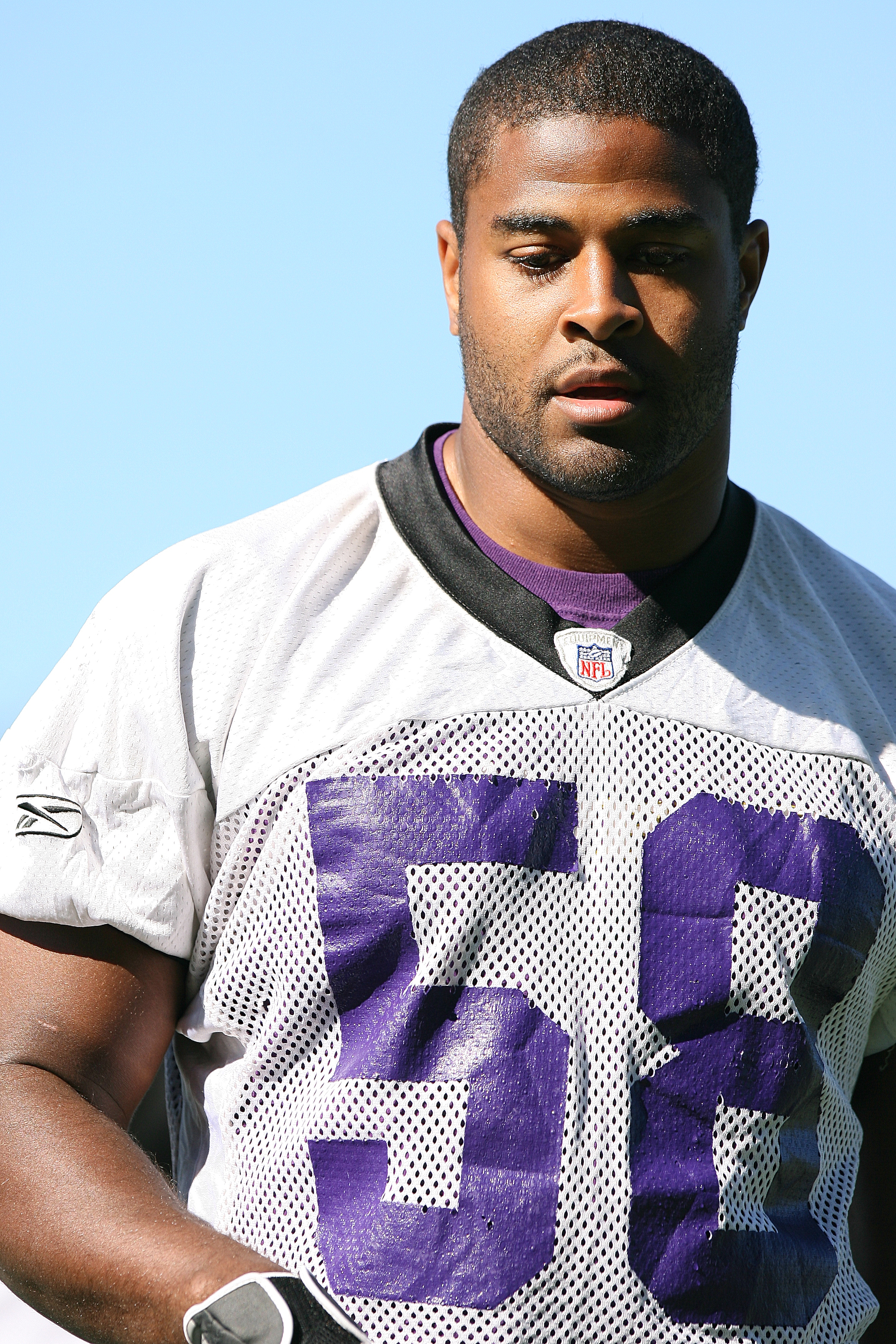
- Haley with the Baltimore Ravens in 2007

No. 56, 58
- Position: Linebacker

Personal information
- Born: February 18, 1982 (age 44); Roanoke, Virginia, U.S.
- Listed height: 6 ft 1 in (1.85 m)
- Listed weight: 247 lb (112 kg)

Career information
- College: Virginia
- NFL draft: 2005: undrafted

Career history
- New York Jets (2005)*; Baltimore Ravens (2005–2007); San Francisco 49ers (2008)*; Hamilton Tiger-Cats (2009); BC Lions (2010)*
- * Offseason or practice squad member only
- Stats at Pro Football Reference
- Stats at CFL.ca (archive)

Dennis Sean Haley (born February 18, 1982) is an American former professional football linebacker. He most recently played for the BC Lions of the Canadian Football League (CFL). He was originally signed by the New York Jets of the National Football League (NFL) as an undrafted free agent in 2005. He played college football at Virginia.

Haley has also played for the Baltimore Ravens and San Francisco 49ers.

On March 15, 2010, Haley was acquired by the BC Lions from the Hamilton Tiger-Cats in exchange for DB Jerome Dennis. He was later released before the start of the 2010 CFL season.

== Early life ==
Haley was a standout player at Salem High School. He joined the varsity team at running back during his freshman season. Haley rushed for 3,762 yards and 63 touchdowns during his 4-year career. He also started at linebacker during his senior season. Haley helped lead Salem to three state championships (1996, 1998, 1999) and an overall record of 48–6. He also played on Salem's state championship basketball team in 1999.
