= Erick Green =

American basketball player (born 1991)

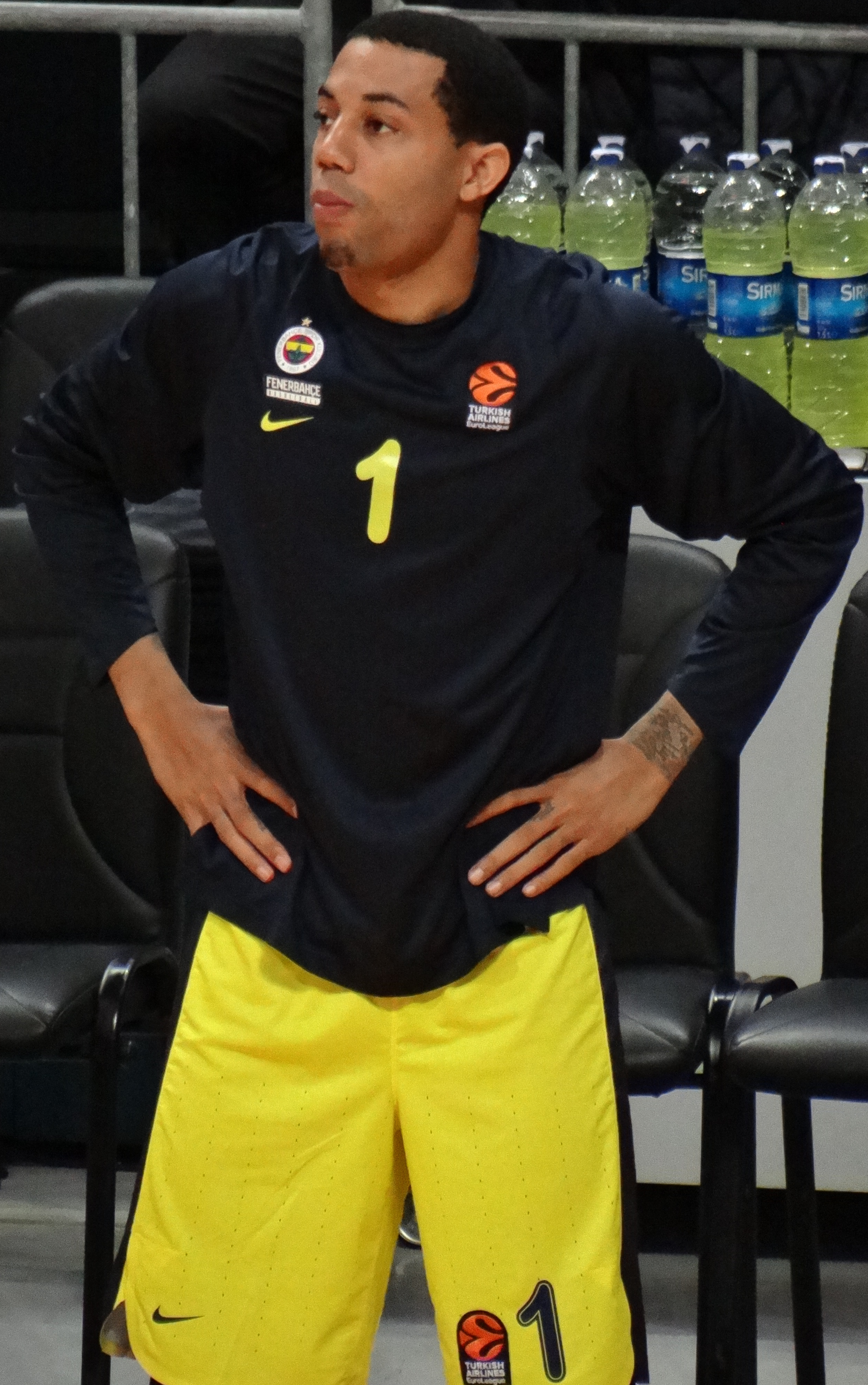
- Green with Fenerbahçe in 2018

No. 32 – Pallacanestro Cantù
- Position: Shooting guard / point guard
- League: LBA

Personal information
- Born: May 9, 1991 (age 35) Inglewood, California, U.S.
- Listed height: 6 ft 3 in (1.91 m)
- Listed weight: 184 lb (83 kg)

Career information
- High school: Millbrook (Winchester, Virginia); Paul VI (Fairfax, Virginia)
- College: Virginia Tech (2009–2013)
- NBA draft: 2013: 2nd round, 46th overall pick
- Drafted by: Utah Jazz
- Playing career: 2013–present

Career history
- 2013–2014: Montepaschi Siena
- 2014–2015: Denver Nuggets
- 2015: →Fort Wayne Mad Ants
- 2015–2016: Reno Bighorns
- 2016: Utah Jazz
- 2016–2017: Olympiacos
- 2017–2018: Valencia
- 2018–2019: Fenerbahçe
- 2019–2020: Fujian Sturgeons
- 2020: Real Betis
- 2020–2021: Bahçeşehir
- 2021–2022: AEK Athens
- 2022: Zhejiang Golden Bulls
- 2022: Treviso
- 2022: Hapoel Holon
- 2022–2023: Budućnost
- 2023–2024: UNICS Kazan
- 2024–2025: Napoli
- 2025: Sagesse
- 2025–2026: Cantù
- 2026: Reyer Venezia
- 2026–present: Cantù

Career highlights
- Montenegrin League champion (2023); Turkish Cup winner (2019); Montenegrin Cup winner (2023); Spanish Supercup winner (2017); Spanish Supercup MVP (2017); All-NBA D-League First Team (2016); NBA D-League All-Star (2016); Italian Supercup winner (2014); Third-team All-American – AP (2013); NCAA scoring champion (2013); ACC Player of the Year – Media (2013); First-team All-ACC (2013); Second-team All-ACC (2012)
- Stats at NBA.com
- Stats at Basketball Reference

Erick O'Brien Green II (born May 9, 1991) is an American professional basketball player for Pallacanestro Cantù of the Italian Lega Basket Serie A (LBA). He finished the 2012–13 NCAA Division I season as the top scorer in the nation at 25.0 points per game. Green was selected by the Utah Jazz with the 46th overall pick in the 2013 NBA draft, but was later traded to the Denver Nuggets.

== High school career ==
Green was born in Inglewood, California but grew up in Winchester, Virginia. He spent the first three years of his prep career at his hometown's Millbrook High School, before transferring for his senior year to Fairfax's Paul VI Catholic High School. Between the two schools, Green earned four varsity letters. In his lone year at Paul VI, he led the Panthers to a state championship (coincidentally, Green had led Millbrook to a state championship the previous season) and was named the 2009 Division I Independent League Player of the Year. After Paul VI's championship he was named an EA Sports All-American. The Washington Post also selected him to their All-Metro Team, the Associated Press picked him as their Virginia Group AA Player of the Year, and Green was named the district and region player of the year.

== College career ==
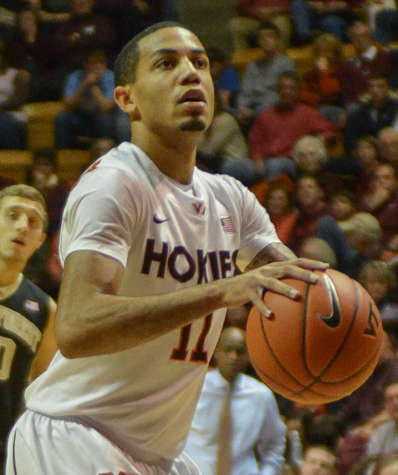
Green playing for Virginia Tech, 2013

Green struggled his freshman season in 2009–10 and averaged just 2.6 points per game and shot 29.3% from the field. His lack of production, he later admitted, "turned [him] into a gym rat" and motivated him to work harder than everyone else to improve his game. Each progressive season he increased his scoring, rebounding and assist averages. By his senior season in 2012–13, and while leading NCAA Division I in scoring for most of the year, the media was discussing Green as a dark horse candidate for Atlantic Coast Conference Player of the Year. Despite his production, the Hokies finished the year with a 13–19 overall record, including a 4–14 conference record where they finished in last place. On March 12, 2013, Green was named the ACC Player of the Year by the ACC's media selectors (Miami's Shane Larkin was the coaches' pick). He joined Maryland's Len Bias (1985–86) as the only two players of the year who competed for teams with losing ACC records.

== Professional career ==
=== Montepaschi Siena (2013–2014) ===
On June 27, 2013, Green was selected by the Utah Jazz with the 46th overall pick in the 2013 NBA draft; his rights were immediately traded to the Denver Nuggets. He joined the Nuggets for the 2013 NBA Summer League where he averaged 9.3 points, 2.2 rebounds and 1.8 assists in six games.

On August 26, 2013, Green signed a one-year deal with Montepaschi Siena of the LBA. In 45 Italian league games for Siena, in 2013–14, he averaged 10.8 points, 1.5 rebounds, and 1.1 assists per game. He also averaged 11.1 points, 1.7 rebounds, and 1.0 assists per game, in 10 games played in the EuroLeague that same season.

=== Denver Nuggets (2014–2015) ===
In July 2014, Green re-joined the Denver Nuggets for the 2014 NBA Summer League. On August 1, 2014, he signed a three-year, $2.3 million contract with the Nuggets after averaging an impressive 16.6 points per game over five Summer League contests for the team. On January 20, 2015, he was assigned to the Fort Wayne Mad Ants of the NBA Development League. Five days later, he was recalled by the Nuggets. In the Nuggets' season finale on April 15, he had a season-best game with 17 points, 7 assists, 4 rebounds and 1 steal in a loss to the Golden State Warriors.

In July 2015, Green re-joined the Nuggets for the 2015 NBA Summer League where he averaged 14.8 points, 1.4 rebounds, 4.0 assists and 1.8 steals in five games. On November 5, 2015, he was waived by the Nuggets.

=== Reno Bighorns and Utah Jazz (2015–2016) ===
On November 21, 2015, Green was acquired by the Reno Bighorns of the NBA Development League. He made his debut for the Bighorns later that night, scoring 23 points in 35 minutes off the bench against the Los Angeles D-Fenders. On January 29, 2016, he was named in the West All-Star team for the 2016 NBA D-League All-Star Game.

On January 26, 2016, Green signed a 10-day contract with the Utah Jazz. The next day, he made his debut for the Jazz in a 102–73 win over the Charlotte Hornets, recording four points and one assist in four minutes of action. On February 5, he signed a second 10-day contract with the Jazz. On February 15, the Jazz did not renew his contract, making him a free agent. Four days later, he re-joined the Bighorns. At the season's end, he was named to the All-NBA D-League First Team.

=== Olympiacos (2016–2017) ===
On July 15, 2016, Green signed a two-year deal with Olympiacos Piraeus. On February 2, 2017, Green recorded a season-high 25 points, shooting 10-of-13 from the field, along with three rebounds and two assists in a 90–75 win over UNICS Kazan. Green helped Olympiacos to reach the 2017 EuroLeague Final, where they eventually lost to Fenerbahçe.

=== Valencia (2017–2018) ===
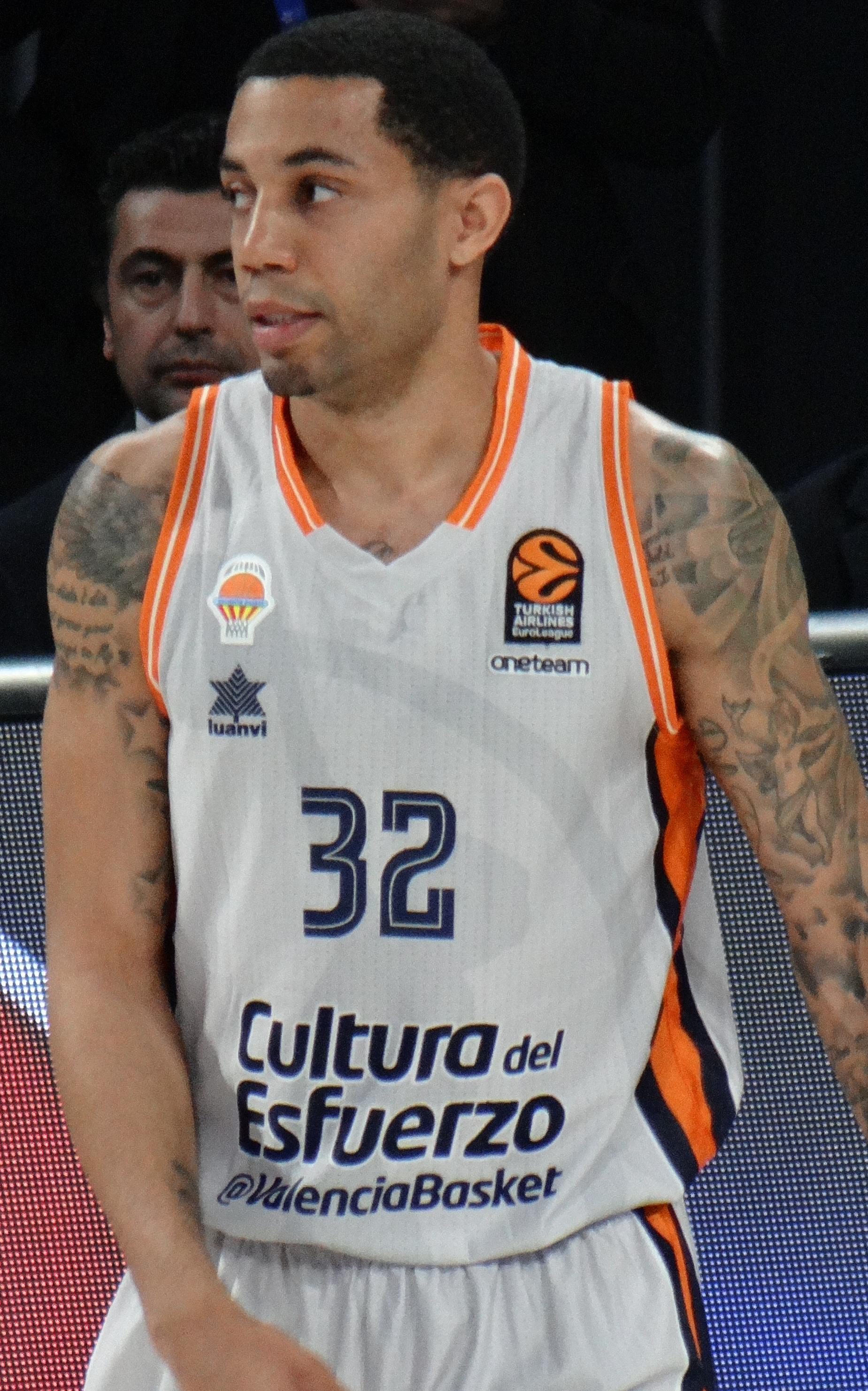
Green with Valencia in 2018

On July 21, 2017, Green signed with Spanish club Valencia Basket for the 2017–18 season. Green helped Valencia to win the 2017 Spanish Supercup and was named the Tournament MVP after averaging 15.5 points in two games.

=== Fenerbahçe (2018–2019) ===
On October 26, 2018, Green signed with the Turkish team Fenerbahçe as an injury cover for Tyler Ennis. On July 10, 2019, Green and Fenerbahçe officially parted ways.

=== Fujian Sturgeons (2018–2019) ===
In July 2019, Green signed a one-year deal with the Fujian Sturgeons of the Chinese Basketball Association (CBA).

=== Coosur Real Betis (2020) ===
On January 28, 2020, he has signed with Coosur Real Betis of the Liga ACB

=== Bahçeşehir Koleji (2020–2021) ===
On June 25, 2020, he has signed with Bahçeşehir Koleji of the Turkish Basketbol Süper Ligi (BSL).

=== Hapoel Holon (2022) ===
On September 28, 2022, he has signed with Hapoel Holon of the Israeli Basketball Premier League.

=== KK Budućnost (2022–2023) ===
On December 29, 2022, he signed with Budućnost VOLI in the Prva A Liga.

=== Napoli Basket (2024–2025) ===
On October 23, 2024, he signed with Napoli Basket of the Lega Basket Serie A (LBA).

=== Pallacanestro Cantù (2025–2026) ===
On December 15, 2025, he signed with Cantù of Italian Lega Basket Serie A (LBA).

=== Reyer Venezia (2026) ===
On September 11, 2026, he signed with Reyer Venezia of the Italian Lega Basket Serie A (LBA).

=== Second stint with Pallacanestro Cantù (2026–present) ===
On November 12, 2026, he signed with Pallacanestro Cantù of the Italian Lega Basket Serie A for a second stint.

== Career statistics ==
Legend
GP	Games played	GS	Games started	MPG	Minutes per game
FG%	Field-goal percentage	3P%	3-point field-goal percentage	FT%	Free-throw percentage
RPG	Rebounds per game	APG	Assists per game	SPG	Steals per game
BPG	Blocks per game	PPG	Points per game	PIR	Performance index rating
**Bold**	Career high

=== NBA ===
==== Regular season ====
Year	Team	GP	GS	MPG	FG%	3P%	FT%	RPG	APG	SPG	BPG	PPG
2014–15	Denver	**43**	**1**	**9.5**	.377	**.298**	.833	.7	**.9**	**.3**	**.0**	**3.4**
2015–16	Denver	3	0	2.3	.000	.000	.000	.3	.3	.0	**.0**	.0
2015–16	Utah	6	0	5.8	**.417**	.250	**1.000**	**.8**	.3	.2	**.0**	2.2
Career		52	1	8.7	.377	.288	.857	.7	.8	.3	.0	3.1

=== EuroLeague ===
Year	Team	GP	GS	MPG	FG%	3P%	FT%	RPG	APG	SPG	BPG	PPG	PIR
2013–14	Montepaschi	10	9	24.4	.421	.343	.692	1.7	1.0	**.9**	.0	11.1	7.2
2016–17	Olympiacos	35	4	20.3	**.471**	.400	.817	**1.9**	.9	.7	**.1**	9.9	8.0
2017–18	Valencia	**28**	**16**	**24.6**	.445	**.417**	**.900**	1.6	**1.7**	.7	.0	**14.3**	**13.5**
Career		74	29	22.2	.440	.393	.860	1.8	1.2	.7	.1	11.8	9.8

== See also ==
- List of NCAA Division I men's basketball season scoring leaders
