= Salem High School (Salem, Virginia) =

Location
- 400 Spartan Drive; Salem, Virginia 24153; United States; 37°17′47.03″N 80°4′45.65″W

Information
- School type: Public, high school
- Established: 1977
- School district: Salem City Public Schools
- Superintendent: Curtis Neil Hicks
- Principal: Jamie Garst
- Faculty: 103.40 (on an FTE basis)
- Grades: 9-12
- Enrollment: 1,213 (2023–24)
- Student to teacher ratio: 11.73
- Language: English
- Colors: Maroon and silver
- Athletics conference: Virginia High School League (regular season); River Ridge District (post-season); Group 4A; North Region; Conference 24
- Nickname: Spartans
- Publication: Delphi (literary magazine)
- Newspaper: Oracle
- Yearbook: Laconian
- Website: School website

Salem High School is a public high school in Salem, Virginia. It is the sole high school for the City of Salem public school system.

Until 2022, Salem was an International Baccalaureate world school, certified for the Diploma Programme.

== History ==
Salem High School was opened for the 1977–1978 school year by Roanoke County public schools to consolidate the student bodies of Andrew Lewis High School in Salem and Glenvar High School in western Roanoke County. Beginning with the 1983–1984 school year, the city of Salem established a separate school district. Glenvar High School was reopened.

Salem competed in the now defunct Group AAA Roanoke Valley District in the AAA Northwest Region when it was opened, but dropped down to the Group AA Blue Ridge District in 1988, a few years after Glenvar's student population left. When the Blue Ridge split in 2003, Salem was assigned to the new River Ridge District. Salem was a member of Region III from 1988 to 2007.

Salem has won VHSL state championships in athletic and academic competitions.

The football team plays in the Salem Football Stadium, and has won ten Group AA, Division 4 championships, in 1996, 1998, 1999, 2000, 2004, 2005, 2015, 2016, 2017 and spring 2021 (COVID-19 delayed the 2020 season).

The boys' lacrosse team won their 1st VHSL Group AAAA state title in 2025, defeating Loudoun County 11–7 in the final.

Salem has also won Group AA state titles in boys' basketball (1994, 1999, 2013), boys' tennis (1993, 1994, 2011), girls' basketball (2013), girls' volleyball (1998), girls' soccer (2003), golf (2012), baseball (2018), and softball (1991). The school's only Group AAA team state championship was won by the boys' golf team in the spring of 1983.

The Quiz bowl team won the Group AA VHSL state championship in 2003, and the forensics team won in 2006, 2007, 2008, 2009, 2010, 2011, 2012, 2013, 2014, 2015, 2016, 2017, 2018, 2019, 2020, 2021, 2022, 2023, 2024. The forensics team holds the top four scores for team points in state forensics competition with 79 (2008), 69 (2007), 67 (2009), and 64 (2010).

Salem won the VHSL's Wachovia Cup in Group AA for academic competitions in the 2009–2010 school year.

Salem's FIRST Robotics Competition team 5724 Spartan Robotics attended the FIRST Championship in 2018 and 2019. They won the Hampton Roads District Event in 2018, and were the Miami Valley Regional Champions in 2019.

Salem's band program, the Pride of Salem, was recognized as a Virginia Honor Band in the 2019-2020, 2022-2023, 2023-2024, 2024-2025, and 2025-2026 season. Furthermore, they were recognized as a Virginia Band Of Distinction in the 2025-2026 season.

== Notable alumni ==
- Mark Byington, current head men's basketball coach at Vanderbilt University (class of 1994)
- Chris Cole, college football linebacker for the Georgia Bulldogs (class of 2024)
- Dennis Haley, former NFL linebacker for the Baltimore Ravens, San Francisco 49ers, and New York Jets; played college football at the University of Virginia (class of 2000)
- Peyton Lewis, college football running back for the Tennessee Volunteers (class of 2024)
- Alex Light, former NFL offensive tackle for the Green Bay Packers, Arizona Cardinals and Dallas Cowboys; played college football at the University of Richmond (class of 2014)
