= Peter Stephens (pioneer) =

- Born: Peter Steffen; March 3, 1687; Steinsfurt, Electoral Palatinate (present day Germany)
- Died: December 6, 1757 (aged 70); Frederick County, Virginia
- Known for: Settling present day Stephens City, Virginia
- Spouse: Maria Christina
- Children: Lewis b: c. 1714; Maria Christina b: c. 1716; Lawrence b: c. 1718; Maria Magdalena b: c. 1722; Margaret b: c. 1724; Peter Jr. b: c. 1728; Henry b: c. 1734
- Parent(s): Mother: Barbara Bar; Father: Gabriel Steffen

Peter Stephens (March 3, 1687 – December 6, 1757) was the son of Gabriel Steffen and of Barbara (née Bar). Stephens is known for founding present-day Stephens City, Virginia.

== Biography ==
Peter Stephens was born Peter Steffen in Steinsfurt, then part of the Electoral Palatinate (present day Germany) on March 3, 1687.

Besides his birth in Swabia, little is known about Stephens before 1699 when he and his parents emigrated to America on William Penn's second shipload of families for the purpose of populating the then Colony of Pennsylvania.

Peter would then migrate to what is now Frederick County, Virginia, and settle south of present-day Winchester, Virginia (which would not be founded for several more years past Stephens arrival).

After buying 674 acres (2.73 km^{2}) from Jost Hite, the act of which was challenged by land baron Thomas Fairfax, 6th Lord Fairfax of Cameron, though settled amicably between Lord Fairfax and Stephens, Peter settled and founded, then unofficially called "Stephens town", in the early 1730s. It would be later chartered by the Virginia General Assembly at the request of his son Lewis and called "Stephensburgh". Today, "Stephensburgh" is called Stephens City and celebrated its 250th anniversary, on October 12, 2008.

His wife, Maria Christina, would have seven children, four sons and three daughters, six of whom would be born in Frederick County, Virginia. Only their first son, Lewis, was born possibly in New York.

Stephens died at the age of 70 in December 6, 1757, just under a year before the town he founded would become chartered in October 1758.
