= Stephens City, Virginia =

- Incorporated town
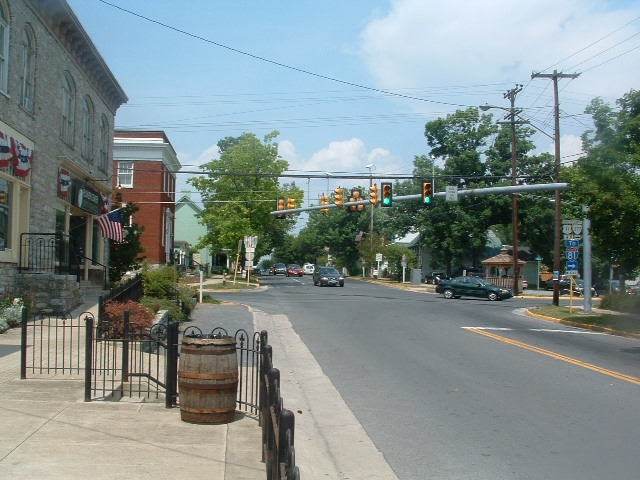
- Intersection of Routes 11 and 277 in the center of town

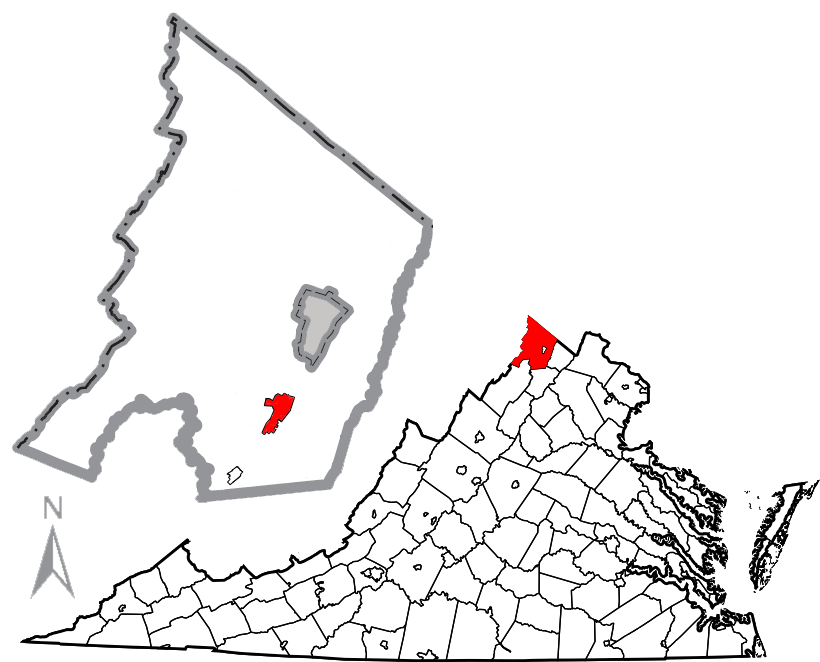
- Location in Frederick County, Virginia

- Location in the United States
- Coordinates: 39°4′59″N 78°13′06″W
- Country: United States
- State: Virginia
- County: Frederick
- Founded: October 12, 1758
- Founder: Lewis Stephens
- Named for: The Stephens family

Government
  - Mayor: Mike Diaz
  - Town Council: Council members: Linden A. Fravel, Jr.; Regina Swygert-Smith; Pete Fravel; Mariah Smith; Tina Stevens; Ronald Bowers
  - Delegate: Bill Wiley (R)
  - VA Senate: Jill Holtzman Vogel (R)
  - U.S. Congress: Ben Cline (R)

Area
  - Total: 2.46 sq mi (6.36 km^{2})
  - Land: 2.42 sq mi (6.28 km^{2})
  - Water: 0.031 sq mi (0.08 km^{2})
- Elevation: 764 ft (233 m)

Population (2020)
  - Total: 2,016
  - Estimate (2022): 2,096
  - Density: 850.5/sq mi (328.37/km^{2})
- Demonym: Stephens Citian
- Time zone: UTC−5 (EST)
  - Summer (DST): UTC−4 (EDT)
- ZIP code: 22655
- Area code: 540
- FIPS code: 51-75344
- GNIS feature ID: 1500159
- Website: stephenscity.org

Stephens City (/ˈstiːvənz/ STEE-vənz) is an incorporated town in the southern part of Frederick County, Virginia, United States, with a population of 2,016 at the time of the 2020 census, and an estimated population of 2,096 in 2022. Founded by Peter Stephens in the 1730s, the colonial town was chartered and named for Lewis Stephens (Peter's only son) in October 1758. It was originally settled by German Protestants from Heidelberg.

Stephens City is the second-oldest municipality in the Shenandoah Valley after nearby Winchester, which is about 5 mi (8 km) to the north. "Crossroads", the first free black community in the Valley in the pre-Civil War years, was founded east of town in the 1850s. Crossroads remained until the beginning of the Civil War when the freed African Americans either escaped or were recaptured. Stephens City was saved from intentional burning in 1864 by Union Major Joseph K. Stearns. The town has gone through several name changes in its history, starting as "Stephensburg", then "Newtown", and finally winding up as "Stephens City", though it nearly became "Pantops". Interstate 81 and U.S. Route 11 pass close to and through the town, respectively.

A large section of the center of the town, including buildings and homes, covering 65 acres (26 ha), is part of the Newtown–Stephensburg Historic District and was listed on the National Register of Historic Places in 1992. Stephens City celebrated its 250th anniversary on October 12, 2008. The town is a part of the Winchester, Virginia-West Virginia Metropolitan Statistical Area, an offshoot of the Washington–Baltimore–Northern Virginia, DC–MD–VA–WV Combined Statistical Area. It is a member of the Winchester–Frederick County Metropolitan Planning Organization.

== History ==
=== Founding and early days ===
The area surrounding present-day Stephens City was originally inhabited for 12,000 years by Native Americans, including the Susquehannock, Lenape, Tuscarora, Catawba, Iroquois, and Cherokee. One of the largest groups, the Shawnee, had already left the area when European settlement began. The tribes that did remain were initially peaceful towards the settlers, but relations soured after resources and land were confiscated. The ancestors of Thomas Fairfax, 6th Lord Fairfax of Cameron, received a land grant from King Charles II of England which included a large portion of modern Virginia. After discovering one of the grant's boundaries, the Potomac River, extended into the Alleghany Mountains and that others had also received grants west of the Blue Ridge Mountains, a compromise was reached whereby these grant holders would keep their land. One of these grants, named the King's Grants, was acquired in 1730 by John and Isaac Vanmeter from Governor Sir William Gooch, 1st Baronet. The Vanmeter grant was purchased by Baron Jost Hite the following year.

Hite, a wealthy Protestant immigrant from Strasburg, Germany, had settled in Kensington, New York, before moving to Montgomery County, Pennsylvania. In 1732, Hite, his three sons-in-law, and a dozen other German and Scotch-Irish families moved south and settled along Opequon Creek, the present site of the John Hite House. One of the men who had traveled with Hite, Peter Stephens, received a land grant of 674 acres (273 hectares) and settled 2 miles (3.2 km) further south where he built a log house. Stephens was also a German Protestant and had immigrated from Heidelberg.

Peter's house was built on the north side of Crooked Run, later renamed Stephens Run. Peter, his wife, Mary (Maria Christen Rittenhouse), and their children were soon joined by others who built homes in the surrounding area. The oldest Stephens child, Ludwig (Lewis), was by that time an adult and operated a tavern at the family homestead. In the 1740s and 1750s, Lewis acquired land from Hite, Fairfax, and Peter Rittenhouse. His land holding was expanded to 900 acres (360 hectares) in 1755 when Peter conveyed 424 acres (172 hectares) to Lewis.

During the French and Indian War, Lewis made plans to establish a town, citing the need for a central area where locals could gather to defend themselves from possible attack. In 1754 Lewis began laying out the town, composed of 80 0.5-acre (0.2 ha) lots and 60 1-acre (0.4 ha) lots. On September 21, 1758, Lewis petitioned the colonial government of Virginia in Williamsburg for a town charter. The Virginia General Assembly approved the charter for the town of "Stephensburgh" on October 12, 1758, making it the second oldest town in Frederick County. Among the town's 900 acres, a market house, common, and three town wells were platted. The mostly German-speaking residents soon left off the "h" in Stephensburgh; the town was usually spelled "Stephensburg". By the start of the Revolutionary War, Stephensburg was often called simply "New Town" or "Newtown", as the new settlement on the Great Wagon Road south of Winchester. During the war, local patriots who fought for the Continental Army included Gabriel Stephens, one of Peter Stephens' grandsons, who was captured at Fort Washington along with other Newtown soldiers.

Newtown continued to grow after the war, and by the 1790s, the town limits were expanded north and Newtown's first post office opened. Shenandoah Valley and Newtown's central location at the intersection of the Valley Pike and a route connecting Alexandria with the Cumberland Gap, today's Route 277, attracted heavy traffic through the region, and wagon-making emerged as an important industry for the town. Local artisans operated over a dozen wagonmaking shops in Newtown, supplying wagons throughout the state. By 1830, the town's population had reached 800. In 1853, free African Americans began a settlement about a mile east of town near the intersection of present-day Route 277 and Double Church Road which became known as "Crossroads" or "Freetown", which lasted until after the Civil War. After the January 1, 1863, Emancipation Proclamation, some of the newly freed slaves worked for Union commanders and many of the already free African Americans left the area.

When the Civil War broke out in 1861, the majority of Newtown's young men joined Confederate forces. During the war, the town was "between the lines", nominally controlled by the Union but with much Confederate partisan activity. On May 24, 1862, Stonewall Jackson's Confederate forces advanced northward on the Valley Pike and attacked Union troops, who were retreating at the time. At Newtown, General George Henry Gordon of the Second Massachusetts Infantry ordered his Federal troops to make a stand. The skirmishing involved heavy artillery fire, but Gordon's men retreated without loss of the important supply wagons. When Gordon left the town to Jackson's forces, both sides claimed a victory. Throughout the day control of the town changed hands six times between Union and Confederate forces.

In June 1864, Major Joseph K. Stearns of the 1st New York Cavalry arrived under orders to burn the town down to help stop Confederate ambushes on the wagon road. Because the remaining population mostly consisted of women, children and the elderly, Stearns allowed the town to stand. He required the adult residents to take the "Ironclad oath", in which they swore that they had not voluntarily provided aid to the Confederacy. The government required the oath, effectively excluding ex-Confederates from the political arena during the Reconstruction era.

In April 1867, the Virginia General Assembly granted a charter to the Winchester and Strasburg Railroad Company. The company was authorized to construct a rail line between Winchester and Strasburg, linking Newtown to the rest of the nation by railroad for the first time. Though the railroad improved the local economy, which had lagged after the end of the war, it decimated the wagon-building trade. In 1880, the United States Post Office Department, faced with nearly a dozen Newtowns in Virginia, announced that the local post office would be renamed "Pantops". This was changed to "Newtonfield" 16 days later. Dissatisfied with both names, the townsfolk chose "Stephens City".

=== 20th century to present ===
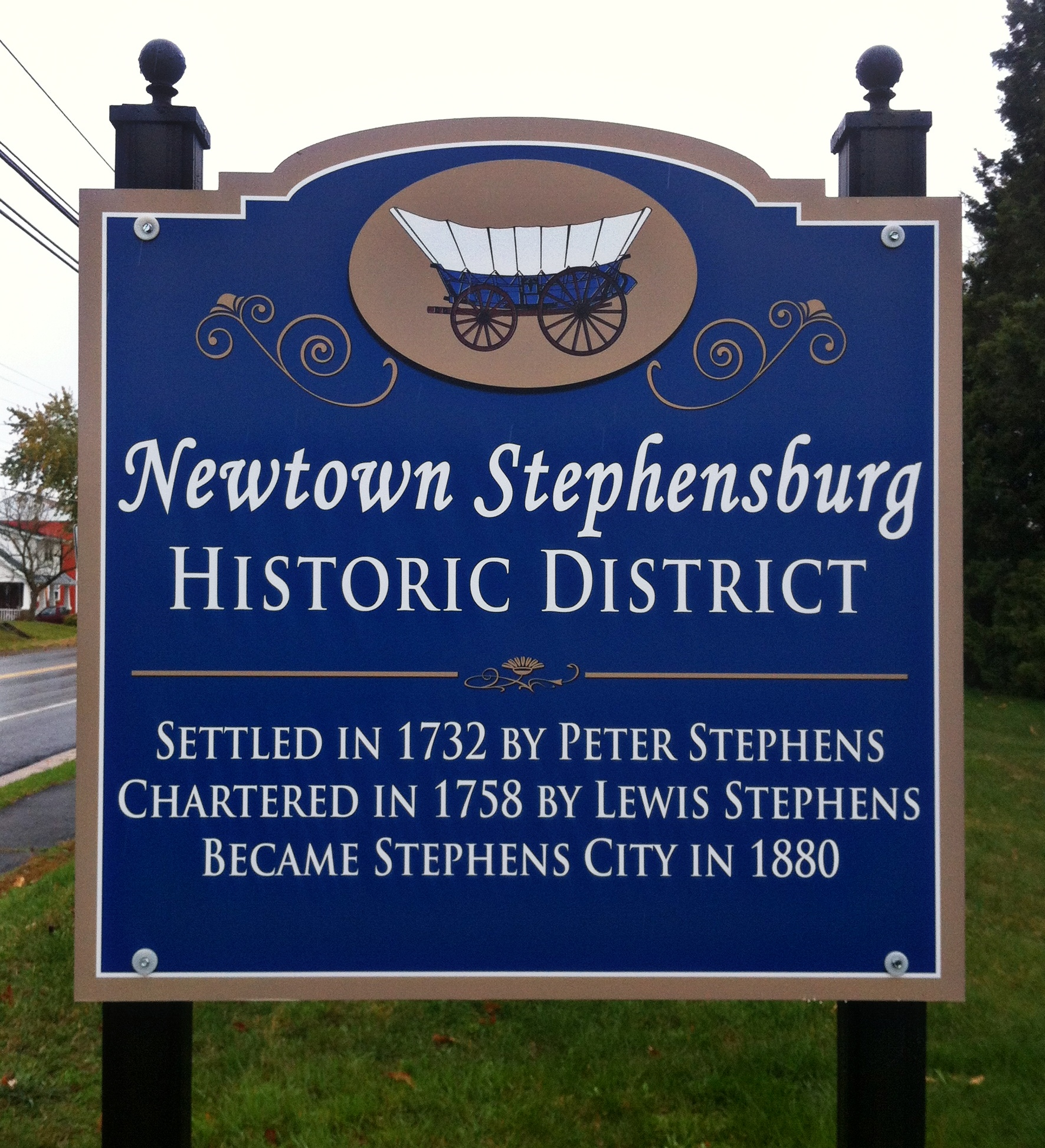
Signage upon entering the town's Newtown–Stephensburg Historic District

In the early 1900s limestone was discovered on the western side of Stephens City. Soon after a lime plant built by the M. J. Grove Lime Company began operations, near the Stephens City Station railway depot and the Stephens City Milling Company. This industrial area, nicknamed "Mudville", would later expand to include commercial businesses. The 20th century brought improvements to energy and domestic systems: electrical service was introduced in 1915; and in 1941, just before World War II, the town installed a water system. Passenger service at the train station ended in 1949. This event, along with the effects of a devastating 1936 fire that destroyed or damaged most of the buildings in Mudville, resulted in the demise of that part of town.

The construction of Interstate 81 (I-81) during the early 1960s depressed business development in the town. The wagon road, which had been made part of U.S. Route 11, had led traffic through the center of town, but the interstate passed less than a tenth of a mile to the east, drawing off development, retail trade and ultimately, businesses. This caused downtown to decline. Developers constructed new residential subdivisions both within and outside the town boundaries to the east for access to I-81, attracting commuters to purchase homes. In 1964, the town's sewer system and the only stoplight in the town limits were both installed. A permanent town hall opened in 1978.

The town surveyed its older buildings to establish architectural significance and to determine those that contributed to the town's historic center. The Newtown–Stephensburg Historic District was listed on the National Register of Historic Places in August 1992. Among the contributing properties to the historic district are numerous 18th-century buildings, 19th-and-early-20th century homes and businesses, cemeteries, churches, and a school complex.

Virginia school systems had practiced massive resistance following the United States Supreme Court ruling in Brown v. Board of Education (1954) that segregated public schools were unconstitutional. The United States District Court for the Western District of Virginia ordered Frederick County schools desegregated (including those serving Stephens City) in Brown v. County School Board (1964). In 1994, Virgil E. Watson was elected as the first African American to serve on the Stephens City Town Council. Watson served for one term, from 1994 until 1998.

In 2003, the lime plant closed, ending around 100 years of limestone production and processing in Stephens City. On September 17, 2004, remnants of Hurricane Ivan spawned an F1 tornado that touched down just south of the town along Interstate 81. It caused approximately $1 million in damage and injured two people. It was one of a record 40 tornadoes to hit northern Virginia that day. Renovation of the town's historic center has attracted heritage tourism. Anticipating more growth, the town annexed 360 acres (1.5 km^{2}) of unincorporated Frederick County in 2005, another 100 acres (0.4 km^{2}) in 2006, and 175 acres (0.7 km^{2}) in 2007. The town celebrated its 250th anniversary on October 12, 2008. During the late 2010s and early 2020s, property developments added hundreds of new homes to the town. In 2022 voters overwhelmingly approved a bond measure to rehabilitate and renovate the town's former school complex into a new town hall and community space.

== Geography ==
The town is located between the Blue Ridge Mountains and the Appalachian Mountains in the northern Shenandoah Valley of Virginia in close proximity to West Virginia, Maryland, and Pennsylvania. Washington, D.C., is approximately 70 mi (110 km) to the east and the center of Baltimore is 105 mi (169 km) to the northeast by highway.

According to the U.S. Census Bureau, the town has an area of 2.4 sq mi (6.3 km^{2}), of which 0.03 sq mi (0.08 km^{2}), or 1.21%, are water. The area within the town limits drains south to Stephens Run, a tributary of the Shenandoah River, and east and north to Opequon Creek, a direct tributary of the Potomac River.

=== Climate ===
Stephens City is located in the humid subtropical climate zone (Köppen climate classification: Cfa) or in the humid continental climate zone (Köppen Climate Classification: Dfa) if the 32 °F (0 °C) isotherm is used (which would make it one of the few municipalities in Virginia to have this climate), exhibiting four distinct seasons. Its climate is typical of Mid-Atlantic U.S. areas removed from bodies of water. The town is located in plant hardiness zone 7 throughout the town and surrounding Frederick County, indicating a temperate climate. Spring and fall are warm, with low humidity, while winter is cool, with annual snowfall averaging 15.0 in (38 cm). Average winter lows tend to be around 30 °F (−1 °C) from mid-December to mid-February. Blizzards affect Stephens City on average once every four to six years. The most violent nor'easters typically feature high winds, heavy rains, and occasional snow. These storms often affect large sections of the U.S. East Coast.

Summers are hot and humid; during this season, highs average in the upper 80s °F (lower 30s °C) and lows average in the upper 60s °F (lower 20s °C). The highest recorded temperature was 107 °F (42 °C) in 1988, while the lowest recorded temperature was −18 °F (−28 °C) in 1983.

Climate data for Stephens City, Virginia
Month	Jan	Feb	Mar	Apr	May	Jun	Jul	Aug	Sep	Oct	Nov	Dec	Year
Temperatures °F (°C)													
Average high	40.8	44.7	53.9	64.8	74.2	82.6	87.1	85.7	78.8	67.5	56.2	45.7	65.2
Average low	20.0	22.2	30.3	38.5	48.7	57.3	62.0	60.1	52.9	40.6	32.5	24.5	40.8
Highest recorded	80 (1950)	80 (1985)	89 (1989)	93 (1960)	97 (2013)	104 (2010)	107 (1988)	105 (2010)	103 (1953)	95 (1986)	85 (1950)	80 (2001)	107 (1988)
Lowest recorded	−18 (1983)	−16 (1996)	−6 (1993)	18 (1950)	28 (1966)	36 (1986)	42 (1988)	36 (1982)	30 (1983)	16 (1988)	9 (1986)	−6 (1989)	−18 (1983)
Precipitation (inches)													
Monthly Average	2.66	2.40	3.33	3.01	3.93	4.10	3.66	3.60	3.59	3.16	3.06	2.60	39.10
Highest monthly	5.92 (1978)	5.67 (1998)	8.36 (1993)	7.07 (1987)	9.40 (1988)	12.67 (1972)	7.35 (1978)	7.89 (1975)	11.31 (1999)	9.01 (1976)	7.33 (1997)	5.55 (1973)	12.67 (1972)
Snowfall (inches)													
Monthly Average	7.9	6.7	2.4	0.2	0.0	0.0	0.0	0.0	0.0	trace	1.0	2.3	20.5
Highest monthly	35.0 (2016)	33.0 (2010)	17.0 (1984)	3.0 (1971)	0.0	0.0	0.0	0.0	0.0	trace (1974)	9.5 (1971)	16.3 (1973)	35.0 (2016)
Sources: Notes: Temperatures are in degrees Fahrenheit. Precipitation includes rain and melted snow or sleet in inches; median values are provided for precipitation and snowfall because mean averages may be misleading. Mean and median values are for the 30-year period 1971–2000; temperature extremes are for the station's period of record (1900–2001). The station is located in 7 miles southeast of Winchester at approximately 39°6′1.45″N 78°10′49.29″W and at 732 ft (223 m) in elevation.

== Demographics ==
Historical population
Census	Pop.	Note	%±
1880	479		—
1890	443		−7.5%
1900	490		10.6%
1910	483		−1.4%
1920	481		−0.4%
1930	606		26.0%
1940	600		−1.0%
1950	676		12.7%
1960	876		29.6%
1970	802		−8.4%
1980	1,179		47.0%
1990	1,186		0.6%
2000	1,146		−3.4%
2010	1,829		59.6%
2020	2,016		10.2%
2022 (est.)	2,096	▲	4.0%

=== Racial and ethnic composition ===
Stephens City town, Virginia – Racial and ethnic composition Note: the US Census treats Hispanic/Latino as an ethnic category. This table excludes Latinos from the racial categories and assigns them to a separate category. Hispanics/Latinos may be of any race.
Race / Ethnicity (NH = Non-Hispanic)	Pop 2000	Pop 2010	Pop 2020	% 2000	% 2010	% 2020
White alone (NH)	1,023	1,481	1,517	89.27%	80.97%	75.25%
Black or African American alone (NH)	75	123	136	6.54%	6.72%	6.75%
Native American or Alaska Native alone (NH)	1	1	3	0.09%	0.05%	0.15%
Asian alone (NH)	18	33	38	1.57%	1.80%	1.88%
Native Hawaiian or Pacific Islander alone (NH)	0	0	7	0.00%	0.00%	0.35%
Other race alone (NH)	0	0	8	0.00%	0.00%	0.40%
Mixed race or Multiracial (NH)	6	57	137	0.52%	3.12%	6.80%
Hispanic or Latino (any race)	23	134	170	2.01%	7.33%	8.43%
Total	1,146	1,829	2,016	100.00%	100.00%	100.00%

=== 2020 census ===
As of the 2020 United States Census, the population of Stephens City was 2,016 people in 802 households, and 451 families residing in the town. The total showed an increase of 10.2% from 2010. The 2022 estimate placed the population at 2,096. The racial makeup of the town was 86% White, 10.3% African American, 3.2% Native American, 2.8% Asian, and 7.3% from other races. Hispanics or Latinos of any race were 8.4% of the population. According to the 2021 American Community Survey, 82.7% of town residents speak only English at home, followed by Spanish at 16.1%, Asian and Pacific Island languages at 0.5%, one of the Indo-European languages other than Spanish at 0.1%, and other languages at 0.5%.

Of the 802 households in 2020, 31.5% had children under the age of 18 living with them, 39.9% were married couples living together, 29.7% had a female householder with no husband present, and 37.3% were non-families. 25.6% of all households were made up of individuals, and 8.7% had someone living alone who was 65 years of age or older. The average household size was 2.51 and the average family size was 3.17. The age distribution was 25.2% under 18, 8% from 18 to 24, 28% from 25 to 44, 23.3% from 45 to 64, and 15.5% who were 65 or older. The median age was 36.1 years. According to the 2021 American Community Survey, the median income for a household in the town was $80,625, and the median income for a family was $86,429. The per capita income for the city was $52,422. Residents who had earned a bachelor's degree or higher was 24.8%.

According to the 2021 American Community Survey, residents self-identified with a variety of ethnic ancestries; the major categories reflect descendants of the settlers of the 18th and 19th centuries. People of German descent make up 10.7% of the population of the town, followed by English at 7.6%, Irish at 7.5%, Scottish at 5.9%, Italian at 2.6%, Scotch-Irish at 1.3%, Polish at 1.3%, Welsh at 1.0%, Subsaharan African at 1.0%, French at 0.8%, French Canadian at 0.8%, Czech at 0.7%, Swedish at 0.3%, Dutch at 0.2%, Greek at 0.2%, Russian at 0.1%, and Slovak at 0.1%. 289 persons, or 12.5%, self-identified as American.

== Economy ==
The economy of Stephens City features several industries. According to the 2021 American Community Survey, the industries in the town (by percentage of employed civilian population 16 years and over) were educational services, health care and social assistance with 28.2%, retail trade with 13.5%, manufacturing with 11.4%, professional, scientific, management, administrative and waste management services at 11.3%, arts, entertainment, recreation, accommodation and food services with 9.1%, public administration with 8.1%, other services excluding public administration with 4.5%, construction with 4.4%, finance, insurance, real estate and rental and leasing with 3.1%, transportation, warehousing, and utilities with 2.2%, wholesale trade with 1.9%, agriculture, forestry, fishing, hunting, and mining with 1.4%, and information with 1%.

As of 2021, the employment rate was 76.3%. Of the people in the labor force in the town over the age of 16, the majority, 1,082 people or 80.9% of the population, were in the civilian work force, while 379 people, or 21.6%, of the population were not in the labor force at all. At the time of the 2021 American Community Survey, 34 people, or 1.9%, were unemployed, with 3 in the Armed Forces. Of the 1,374 residents employed age 16 and over, private-sector wage and salary workers accounted for 1,048 of them or 78.4%. There were 255 people classified as federal government workers, or 19.1% of the population, with the self-employed making up 2.5% of the population or 34 people. None of the population were classified as unpaid workers.

== Culture ==
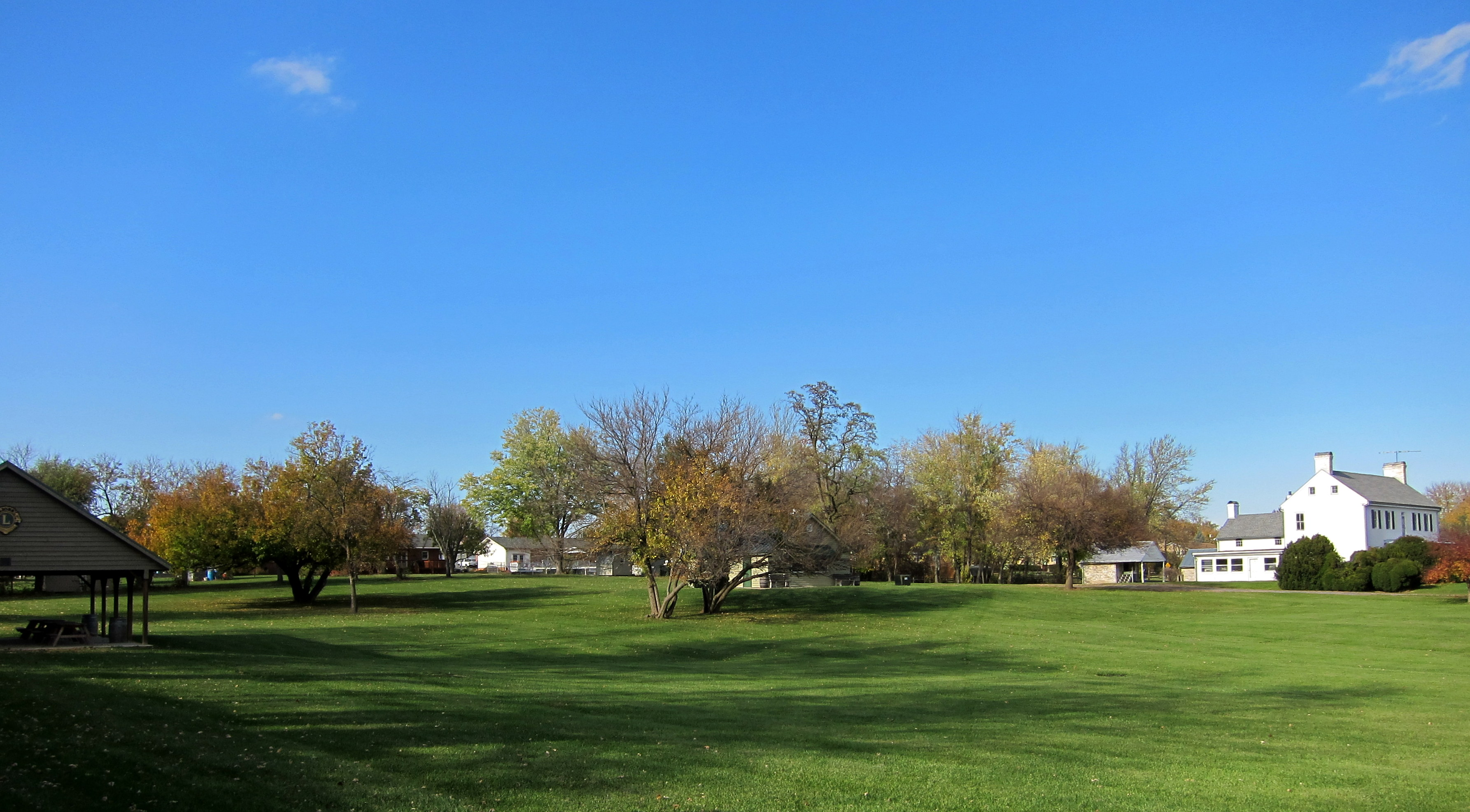
View of Newtown Commons, located along Main Street (US 11) in Stephens City

=== Parks and recreation ===
Town residents have access to two parks within town limits: Newtown Commons and Bel Air Street Park. Newtown Commons, sometimes called Newtown Park, is located along Main Street, and the other is on Bel Air Street. At Newtown Commons, residents can hold outdoor events such as picnics, fundraisers or small concerts. The Bel Air Street Park is a playground for children with standard swingsets and other activities.

Just outside Stephens City is Sherando Park. The park houses several trails, ponds, a pool, sports fields and more. Sherando Park is also home of the Virginia Tech Memorial Garden, planted in memory of the Virginia Tech shooting, which took place approximately 175 mi (282 km) from the park. It has "a winding sidewalk shaped in the college's trademark 'VT'" and "a flagpole surrounded by 32 Hokie Stones", one for each of the 32 victims of the shooting. The Memorial Garden was dedicated and opened on April 16, 2009, the second anniversary of the shooting. The park was built by the Shenandoah Chapter of Virginia Tech Alumni Association, which is based in nearby Winchester, Virginia. The Historic Route 11 Drive-In Theatre, a two-screen drive-in theater, is located near the town, on U.S. Route 11 just south of Stephens City. It is one of six drive-ins in the state of Virginia.

=== Annual events ===
Stephens City plays host to the annual "Newtown Heritage Festival" held each Memorial Day weekend. The three-day event features many crafts, carnival-style food, a tractor wagon ride through town, local music at Newtown Commons, a parade on Saturday and fireworks. Stephens City is one of the towns along the Route 11 Yard Crawl. A yearly event held during the second Saturday in August, the Yard Crawl is an almost 50-mile-long (80-kilometer) yard sale that stretches from Stephens City's Newtown Commons south along U.S. Route 11 to New Market, Virginia. The event is sponsored by the Shenandoah County Chamber Advisory Group, five chambers of commerce, and the town of Stephens City.

=== Religion ===
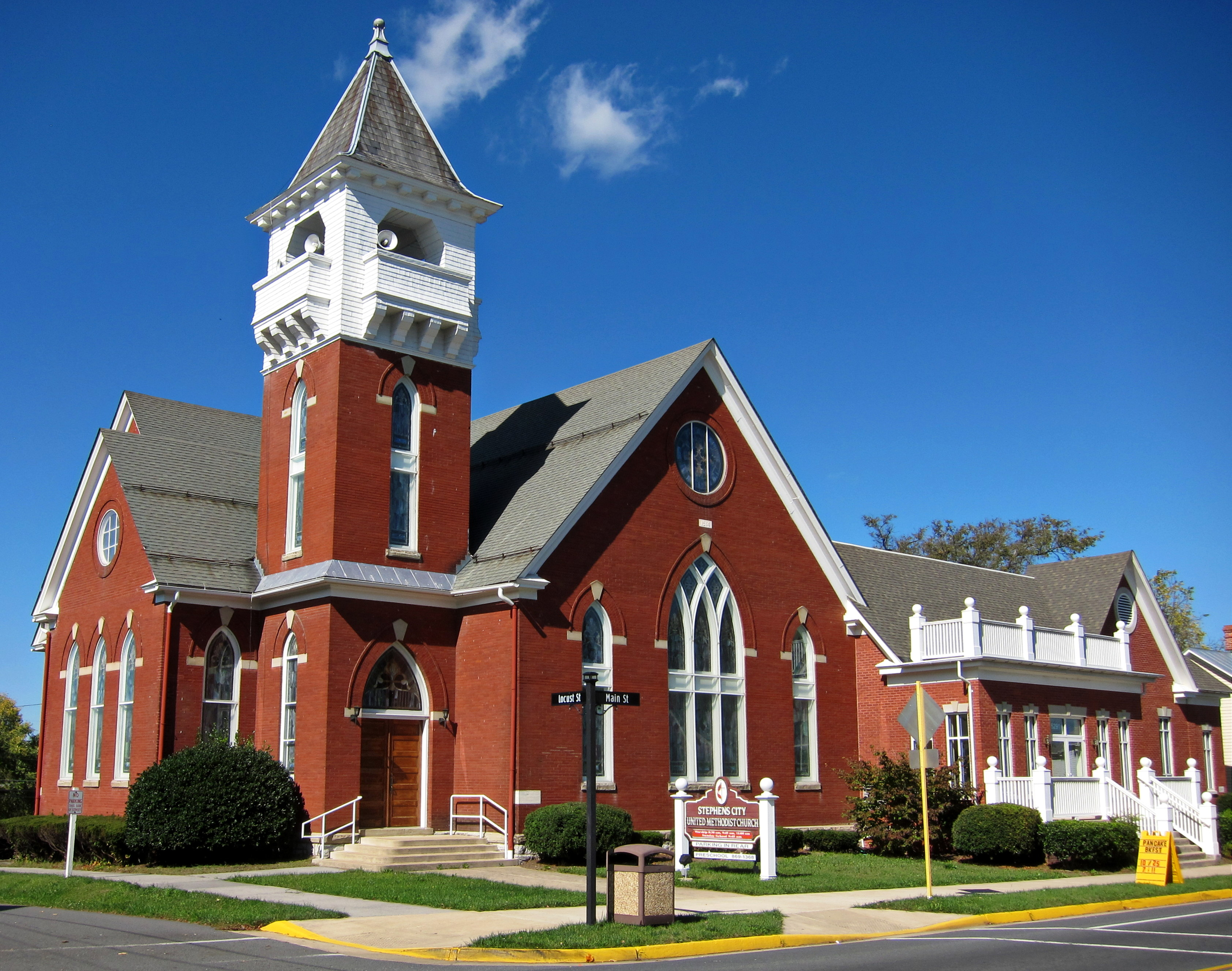
Stephens City United Methodist Church

The earliest organized religious congregation in Stephens City was a Reformed church that met in a log cabin. Lutherans began worshipping together in the town in 1770. The two congregations shared use of the log cabin beginning in 1786. Services were conducted in German until the 1820s, reflecting the heritage of the town's early founders. The log cabin was replaced in 1812 with a brick building, which was later expanded in 1851. The current Trinity Lutheran Church was built in 1906 and incorporates some of the material from the previous structure.

Methodism arrived in Stephens City in 1775 and the first Methodist society west of the Blue Ridge Mountains was established. Some of the earliest members of the Methodist congregation were members of the Stephens and Hite families. During the congregation's early years, members would often meet in homes. Lewis Stephens donated land for a permanent meeting place, and in 1790, a log cabin that Francis Asbury described as a "spacious chapel" was built. In 1827, the congregation replaced the log cabin with a brick building that was used until 1882. The current Stephens City United Methodist Church was built in 1913.

The oldest surviving church building in the town is Orrick Chapel, built between 1866 and 1869 as the home of an African Methodist Episcopal congregation. Missionaries from this first independent black denomination came South after the war to aid freedmen and plant new congregations; they attracted hundreds of thousands of new members. This church replaced an earlier Methodist chapel constructed in the late 1850s; it was razed by Union troops during the winter months of 1864–1865 near the end of the Civil War. Two other black churches in Stephens City are a nondenominational congregation which meets in a former Baptist church built in 1891, and a Full Gospel congregation which meets in a former Free Will Baptist church, also built in 1891.

Just south of the town limits is a Mennonite church. Further south is a Unitarian Universalist church. A Roman Catholic parish affiliated with the Diocese of Arlington and a Jewish synagogue, which each function as centers for their respective members in the entire Shenandoah Valley, are located approximately 5 mi (8.0 km) north in Winchester.

== Government ==
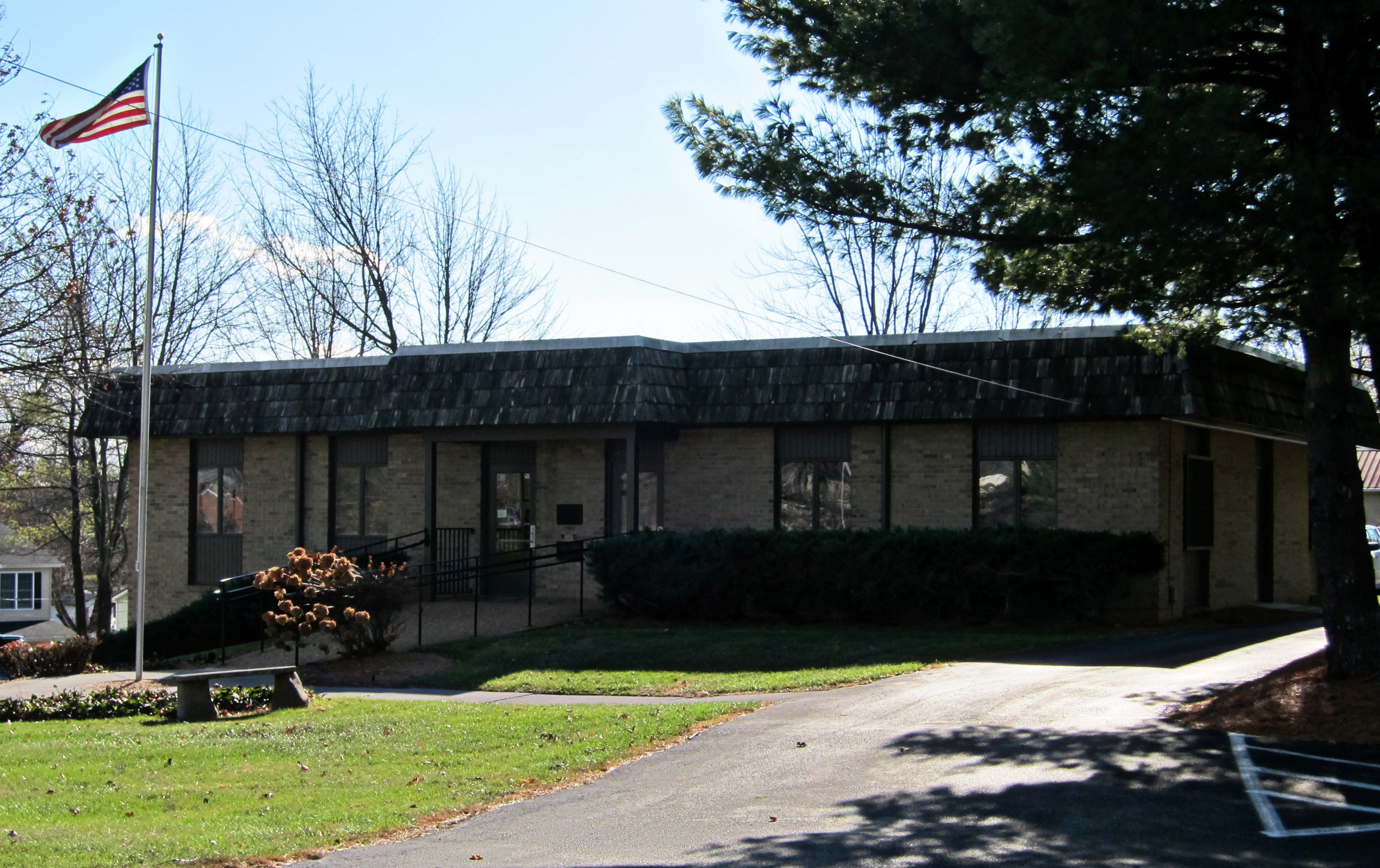
The Town Government Offices of Stephens City are located along Locust Street.

The town is led by a Mayor, currently Mike Diaz, who was elected in 2018 and re-elected in 2022. The representative body of Stephens City is known as the Town Council, whose elected members include Linden A. Fravel Jr., who also serves as Vice Mayor, Regina Swygert-Smith, Pete Fravel, Mariah Smith, Tina Stevens and Ronald Bowers. The Town Manager is Mike Majher, who also serves as the Town Planner. Other administrative staff working for the town government include the Town Clerk (Kelly Thatcher) and Town Treasurer (Steve Rickards).

The town is served by Police Chief William "Bill" Copp and Fire & EMS Chief Timothy J. Vaught, both of whom are on the town's Public Safety Committee. The town is served by five other committees: the Administrative Committee, the Personnel Committee, the Water and Sewer Committee, the Public Works Committee, and the Finance Committee. The members of those five committees are composed of Town Council members. The town's Planning Commission reviews proposed changes to land use, including zoning and property development. The town's Historic Preservation Commission reviews proposals for new buildings and alterations to existing structures.

Stephens City is represented by Chris Collins (Republican) in the Virginia House of Delegates 29th District. Jill Holtzman Vogel (Republican) represents the town in the Virginia Senate's 27th District. The town is represented by Bill Wiley (Republican) in the U.S. House of Representatives from Virginia's 6th district. Tim Kaine (Democrat) and Mark Warner (Democrat) represent the town in the United States Senate.

== Education ==
Frederick County Public Schools operate the public schools that serve Stephens City, although none are located within Stephens City proper; public schools that serve Stephens City are within a few miles of the town limits. The town and surrounding area are served by Bass-Hoover Elementary School, Robert E. Aylor Middle School (in nearby White Post), and Sherando High School. The latter was named for one of the historic Iroquoian-speaking tribes encountered by early European settlers to the Shenandoah Valley. Eukarya Christian Academy and Legacy Christian Academy are two private schools located outside the town's corporate limits. The two local options for residents wishing to obtain degrees in higher education are Shenandoah University in Winchester and Laurel Ridge Community College in Middletown.

== Media ==
From 1881 to 1883, Stephens City had a community newspaper, the Stephens City Star. During its short history, it was led by three editors: Charles E. Painter, S. M. Stickley, and Ben S. Gilmore. Since 1896, the town and surrounding area have been covered by The Winchester Star. Another regional newspaper, The Northern Virginia Daily, is based in nearby Strasburg. Other regional news outlets include the Warren/Frederick County Report and the Royal Examiner.

== Infrastructure ==
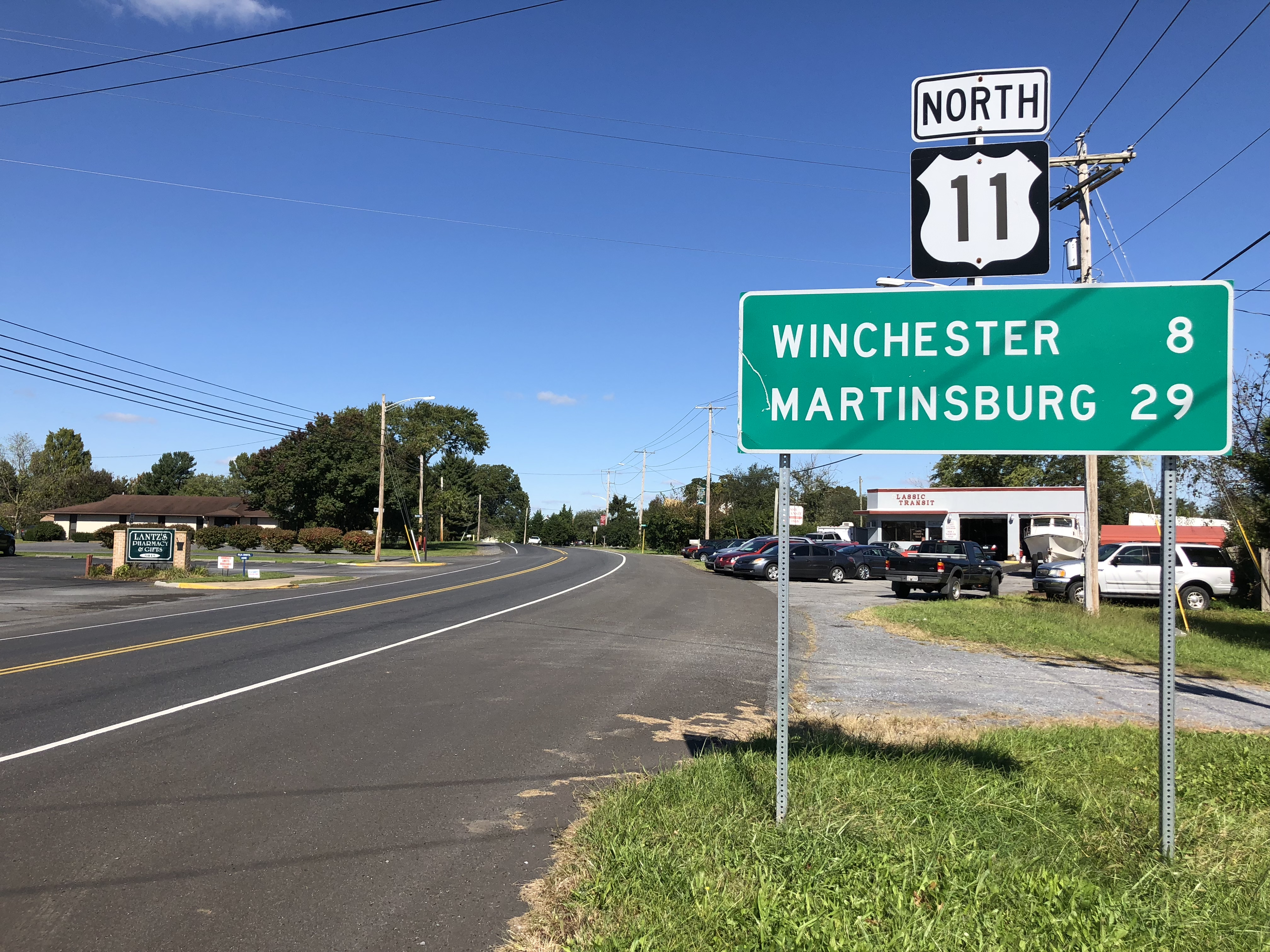
U.S. 11 in Stephens City

=== Transportation ===
Historic U.S. Route 11 (Main Street) traverses Stephens City proper, while Interstate 81 is located immediately east of the town line. Stephens City serves as the western terminus of State Route 277 (Fairfax Street), which begins at U.S. Route 11 and ends only 4.72 mi (7.60 km) away in Double Tollgate, Clarke County, Virginia, at U.S. Routes 340 and 522. In addition to Main Street, the major north–south streets in town are Barley Drive, German Street, and Mulberry Street. The major streets running east–west other than Fairfax Street are Locust Street, School Street, and Short Street/Steele Court.

Plans are in place to move State Route 277 to near the Historic Route 11 Drive-In Theatre, 0.50 mi (0.80 km) south of its current western terminus with US Route 11, with the eastern terminus remaining at its current location. The planned construction will also move the I-81 interchange at Stephens City, where there are a number of service stations and fast food restaurants, south of the town limits to alleviate congestion on the current Route 277 bridge, which will remain after construction is completed. Planners expect expansion of Stephens City to the south.

There are no public transportation options in Stephens City, but officials plan to create a system of bicycle trails and sidewalks, including a connection to Sherando Park and other areas east of Interstate 81. The nearest train station is the Martinsburg station in Martinsburg, West Virginia, which is serviced by Amtrak intercity rail and Marc commuter rail. Winchester Regional Airport is mostly used for general aviation. The nearest major airport is Dulles International Airport, approximately one hour east of Stephens City.

=== Utilities ===
Water and sewer services in Stephens City are provided by Frederick Water and customers are billed by the town on a bi-monthly basis. The town also provides free trash collection each week. Electricity services are provided by Rappahannock Electric Cooperative and Shenandoah Gas Company provides natural gas service.

=== Healthcare ===
The nearest hospitals to Stephens City are both operated by Valley Health: Winchester Medical Center in Winchester and Warren Memorial Hospital in Front Royal. Valley Health and MedExpress operate urgent care centers in Winchester, Front Royal, and Strasburg.

== Notable people ==
- Timothy T. O'Donnell, author, professor, and president (1992–2024) of Christendom College
- Kelley Washington, National Football League player
