= Kelley Washington =

American football player (born 1979)

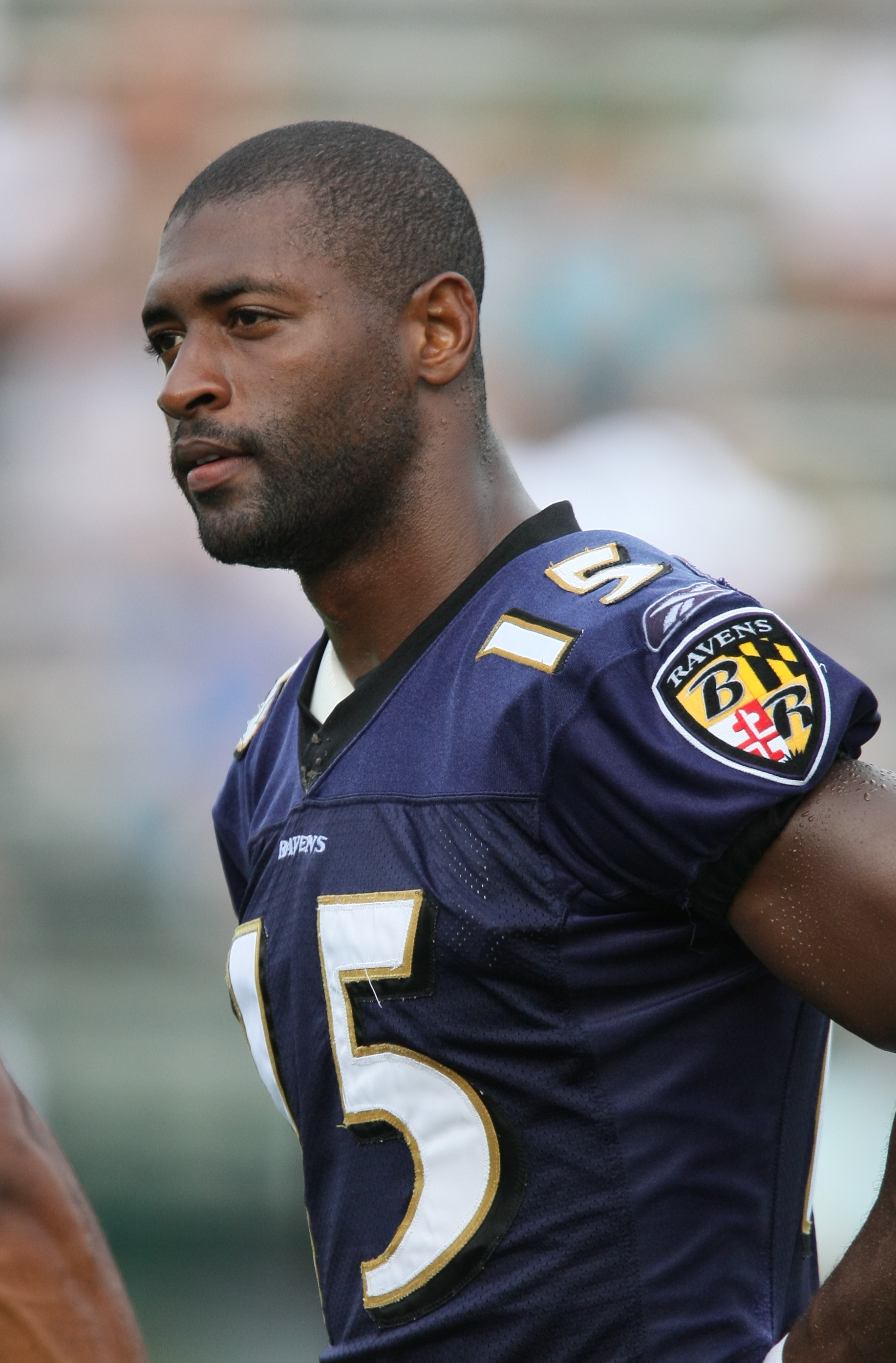
- Washington with the Baltimore Ravens in 2009

No. 87, 15
- Positions: Wide receiver, special teamer

Personal information
- Born: August 21, 1979 (age 47); Stephens City, Virginia, U.S.
- Listed height: 6 ft 3 in (1.91 m)
- Listed weight: 217 lb (98 kg)

Career information
- High school: Sherando (Stephens City)
- College: Tennessee
- NFL draft: 2003: 3rd round, 65th overall pick

Career history
- Cincinnati Bengals (2003–2006); New England Patriots (2007–2008); Baltimore Ravens (2009); Philadelphia Eagles (2010)*; San Diego Chargers (2010)
- * Offseason or practice squad member only

Awards and highlights
- Second-team All-SEC (2001); Freshman All-American (2001)

Career NFL statistics
- Receptions: 120
- Receiving yards: 1,500
- Receiving touchdowns: 12
- Stats at Pro Football Reference

James Kelley Washington (born August 21, 1979) is an American former professional football player who was a wide receiver and special teamer in the National Football League (NFL). He was selected 65th overall by the Cincinnati Bengals in the third round of the 2003 NFL draft. He played college football for the Tennessee Volunteers.

Washington was also a member of the New England Patriots, Baltimore Ravens, Philadelphia Eagles, and the San Diego Chargers.

== Early life ==
Washington was born in Stephens City, Virginia, where he attended Sherando High School, and was a letterman in football, basketball, and baseball. In football, he was a two-way starter as a quarterback and defensive back and as a senior he was an All-State selection. He twice led his team to the Virginia Class AA-Division 4 State Championship game, though the Warriors lost both times.

== Baseball career ==
He was taken in the tenth round of the June 1997 professional baseball draft by the Florida Marlins and signed as a shortstop. Washington spent four years in the minor leagues, often rooming with future All-Star pitcher Josh Beckett. He never played higher than Single-A.

== College career ==
Washington spent two seasons at the University of Tennessee. As a 22-year-old freshman in 2001, he caught 70 passes for 1,080 yards and seven touchdowns and made the freshman All-American team. In 2001, he etched his name in the Tennessee school history with a single-game record 256 receiving yards on 11 catches in the regular season matchup with LSU.

Considered a lock to be a first-round pick if he left early, Washington stayed for his sophomore year but was limited to four games due to injuries. After missing the first two games of that 2002 season with a knee sprain, and suffered a concussion October 12 at Georgia that sidelined him for the remainder of the season. He underwent surgery on November 19 to fuse two vertebrae in his neck.

== Professional career ==
=== Cincinnati Bengals ===
Washington was selected 65th overall by the Cincinnati Bengals in the third round of the 2003 NFL draft. He made his NFL debut in Week 1 of the 2003 season against the Broncos. He scord his first NFL touchdown in Week 8 against the Seahawks on an eight-yard reception from Jon Kitna. He never got much playing time while in Cincinnati, recording just 893 yards and nine touchdowns in four seasons. In Cincinnati, he was famous for his signature "Squirrel" dance after scoring touchdowns. He was released following the 2006 season.

=== New England Patriots ===
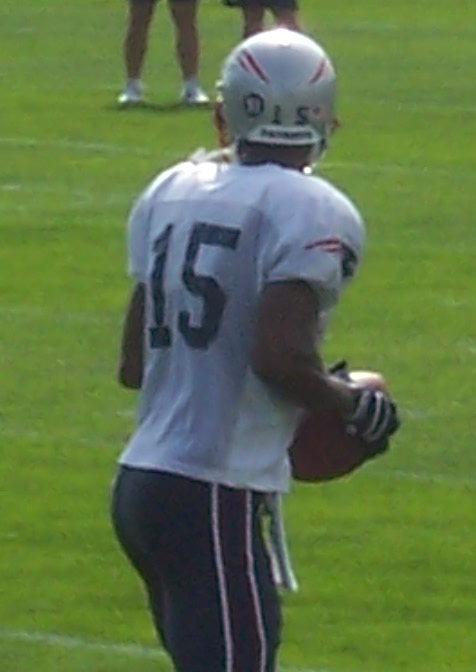
Washington with the Patriots in 2007

On March 11, 2007, Washington agreed to a five-year deal with the New England Patriots, reuniting him with his college teammate and fellow wide receiver Donté Stallworth. The deal, with a $300,000 signing bonus and a $4-million bonus due in the 2008, could be worth as much as $22 million over five years. While Washington had not been used as a wide receiver by the Patriots, he had seen time on special teams, blocking a punt against the New York Jets. On February 29, 2008, Washington was re-signed by the Patriots under a new contract.

Washington was released by the Patriots on February 17, 2009.

=== Baltimore Ravens ===
The Baltimore Ravens invited Washington to an offseason mini-camp to try out for the team, competing against fellow veteran, free-agent receivers Jerry Porter and Tab Perry. Washington outperformed Porter and Perry, and on May 14, 2009, Washington agreed to terms on a contract with the Ravens. During the 2009 season, set career highs across the board, with 31 receptions, 431 yards, and two touchdowns.

=== Philadelphia Eagles ===
Washington was signed by the Philadelphia Eagles on July 31, 2010. Washington was released by the Eagles on September 5, 2010, after failing to make the 53-man roster.

=== San Diego Chargers ===
The San Diego Chargers signed Washington to a short-term contract on November 4, 2010. He had 13 catches for 173 yards and a touchdown in the 2010 season. His lone touchdown came in Week 16 against the Bengals.
