= Alex Light =

American football player (born 1996)

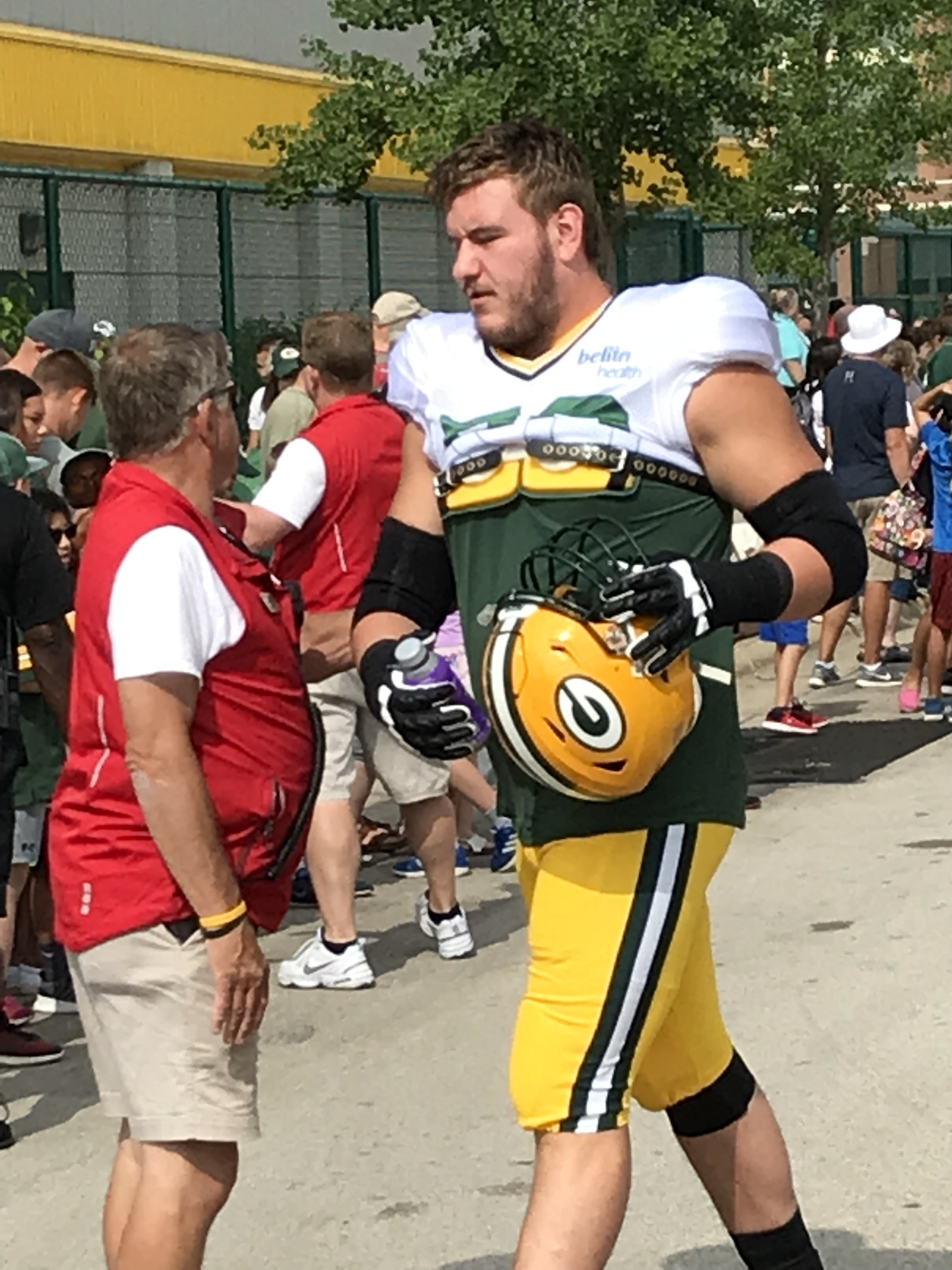
- Light with the Green Bay Packers in 2019

No. 70
- Position: Offensive tackle

Personal information
- Born: May 2, 1996 (age 30); Salem, Virginia, U.S.
- Listed height: 6 ft 5 in (1.96 m)
- Listed weight: 309 lb (140 kg)

Career information
- High school: Salem
- College: Richmond (2014–2017)
- NFL draft: 2018: undrafted

Career history
- Green Bay Packers (2018–2019); Arizona Cardinals (2020)*; Dallas Cowboys (2020)
- * Offseason or practice squad member only

Career NFL statistics
- Games played: 16
- Games started: 0
- Stats at Pro Football Reference

Alex Light (born May 2, 1996) is an American former professional football player who was an offensive tackle in the National Football League (NFL). He played college football for the Richmond Spiders, and was signed by the Green Bay Packers as an undrafted free agent in 2018. He also played for the Dallas Cowboys.

== Early life ==
Light lettered in football and basketball at Salem High School. Light was a two time all-state football player. He committed to Richmond over an offer from VMI.

== College career ==
Light appeared in 43 games, making 37 starts, for the Spiders. During his senior season, Light received first-team all-Colonial Athletic Association honors.

== Professional career ==
=== Green Bay Packers ===
Light signed with the Green Bay Packers as an undrafted free agent on May 4, 2018. He made the final 53-man roster, but was inactive for most of the season. Light made his first professional appearance on December 9, 2018, in a 34–20 victory over the Atlanta Falcons. He was suspended one game on December 17, 2018 for violating the league's substance-abuse policy.

Light was waived on September 5, 2020, and was signed to the practice squad the following day. Light was released by the Packers on September 10.

=== Arizona Cardinals ===
On September 14, 2020, Light was signed to the Arizona Cardinals practice squad.

=== Dallas Cowboys ===
The next day on September 15, Light was signed by the Dallas Cowboys off the Cardinals practice squad. He was waived on October 6, 2020.
