= Newtown–Stephensburg Historic District =

Historic district in Virginia, United States

- U.S. National Register of Historic Places
- U.S. Historic district
- Virginia Landmarks Register
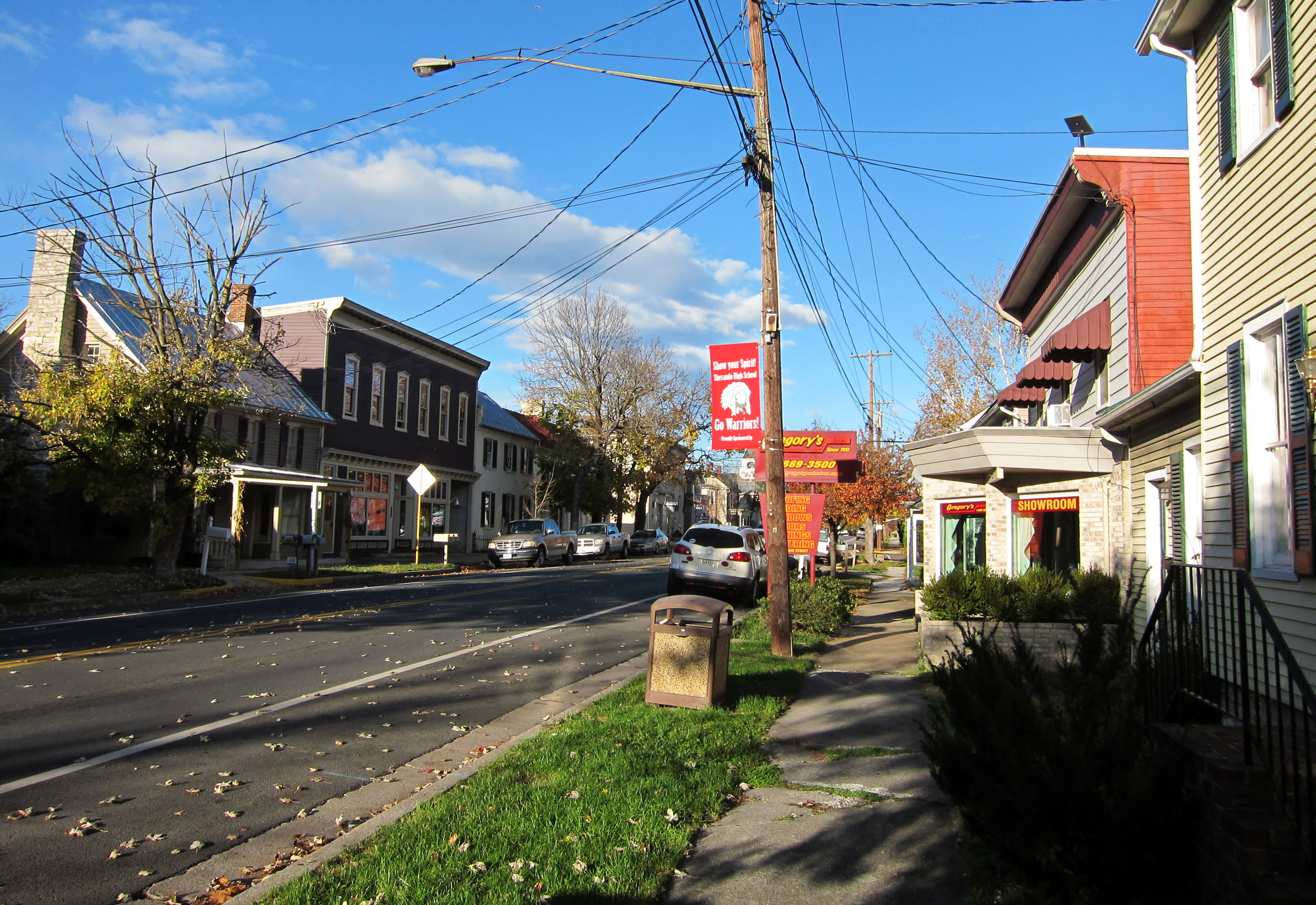
- 5300 block of Main Street
- Location: Area including Main, Mulberry, Green, Fairfax, Martin, Short, Germain, and Water streets
- Nearest city: Stephens City, Virginia
- Coordinates: 39°5′10″N 78°13′11″W
- Area: 65 acres (26 ha)
- Built: 1758 to 1941
- Architectural style: Late Victorian; Late 19th and 20th Century Revivals; Mid 19th Century Revival
- NRHP reference No.: 92001033
- VLR No.: 304-0001

Significant dates
- Added to NRHP: August 18, 1992
- Designated VLR: December 11, 1991

The Newtown–Stephensburg Historic District is located in the central section of Stephens City, Virginia along U.S. Route 11 from the far northern to the far southern boundaries of the town and from just east of Green Hill Cemetery to just west of the interchange of State Route 277 and Interstate 81.

It is a 65-acre (26 ha) historic district that includes 143 contributing buildings and 4 additional contributing sites.

== History ==
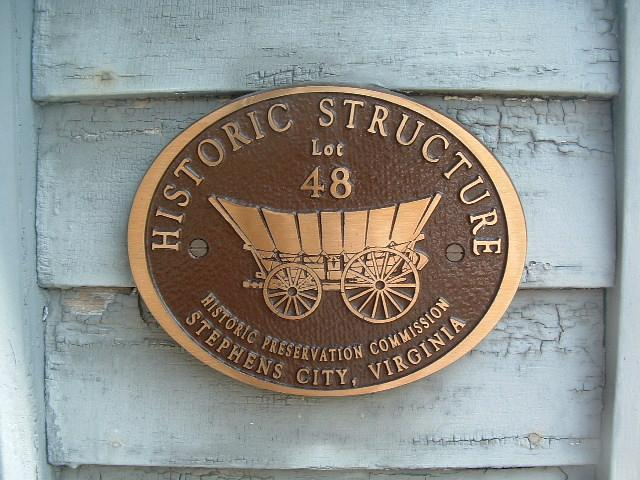
A Historic Preservation Commission plaque, that all buildings carry, in the Newtown–Stephensburg Historic District in Stephens City.

The area that makes up the Newtown–Stephensburg Historic District was originally settled in 1734 by German settler Peter Stephens. Stephens travelled from Pennsylvania with Joist Hite in 1732. Hite's grandson, Issac Hite, Jr. would later build the Belle Grove Plantation in nearby Middletown, Virginia.

Peter Stephens son, Lewis Stephens, was the owner of the original 900 acres (3.6 km^{2}) that made up the town of Stephensburgh, as it was called when chartered and founded in September 1758.

Stephensburgh would become the second oldest town in the Shenandoah Valley (behind nearby Winchester, Virginia). Since its beginnings, the town would be a commercial hub along the "Great Philadelphia Wagon Road" (what is now today U.S. Route 11) and the "Old Dutch Wagon Road" (what is today State Route 277). Because Routes 11 and 277 were two very heavily traveled arteries through the 19th and 20th centuries, the town's businesses oriented towards transportation from the nationally known "Newtown Wagon" companies for the 1800s to today numerous service centers and eateries.

The historical integrity of the individual buildings and the general townscape that make up this historic area is impressive; little to no new construction has taken place in this area since the early 1940s.

== See also ==
- National Register of Historic Places in Frederick County, Virginia
