= Double Tollgate, Virginia =

Unincorporated community in Virginia, United States

- Unincorporated community
- Location within the Commonwealth of Virginia Double Tollgate (Virginia) Double Tollgate (the United States)
- Coordinates: 39°3′40″N 78°8′18″W
- Country: United States
- State: Virginia
- County: Clarke
- Time zone: UTC−5 (Eastern (EST))
  - Summer (DST): UTC−4 (EDT)

Double Tollgate is an unincorporated community in Clarke County, Virginia, United States. Double Tollgate is located at the intersection of Fairfax Pike (State Route 277), Front Royal Pike (U.S. Route 522), Lord Fairfax Highway (U.S. Route 340), and Stonewall Jackson Highway (U.S. Routes 340 and 522).
