= Winchester Public Schools (Virginia) =

School district in Virginia, United States

The Winchester Public Schools serve the city of Winchester, Virginia. The school division was founded in 1919. There are eight schools and about 3500 students.

- John Handley High School, grades 9–12. This school has been on the National Register of Historic Places since 1998 and is named for its founder, Judge John Handley.
- Daniel Morgan Intermediate School, grades 5–6 and Daniel Morgan Middle School, grades 7–8, both named for General Daniel Morgan
- Frederick Douglass Elementary School, grades K–4 named for Frederick Douglass
- Garland R. Quarles Elementary School, grades K–4
- John Kerr Elementary School, grades K–4, named after a local benefactor
- Virginia Avenue, Charlotte Dehart School, grades K–4, named for its first Principal
- Emil and Grace Shihadeh Innovation Center, for Career and Technical Education, endowed by the Frederick D. and Karen G. Schaufeld Family Foundation in honour of Karen Schaufeld's parents.
