= Millbrook High School (Virginia) =

Location
- Winchester, Virginia; United States; 39.1912949°N 78.1173667°W

Information
- School type: Public
- Founded: 2003
- Principal: Joanne Altendorf
- Enrollment: 1,516 (2022–23)
- Schedule type: Modified block schedule
- Hours in school day: 7:55 am – 2:30 pm
- Colors: Navy, Carolina Blue, and White
- Mascot: Pioneers
- Information: +1 540-533-7607
- Website: https://mhs.frederickcountyschoolsva.net/

Millbrook School is a high school located in Winchester, Virginia. The school is one of three high schools in the Frederick County Public School System. It is one of the newest schools in the area, having been established in 2003, intended to relieve overpopulation in nearby James Wood High School and Sherando High School.

== Schedule ==
Millbrook High School uses a block scheduling system, utilizing Day 1 and Day 2 schedules. Each block is one and a half hours long and meets every other day. The school also uses a traditional 4 quarter system with each quarter lasting 9 weeks.

== Athletics ==
Millbrook High School plays in the AAAA Northwestern District. Despite its short athletic history, it has established strong programs in football, golf, volleyball, tennis, cross country, basketball, track, swimming, baseball, wrestling, soccer, and cheerleading earning numerous district titles and back-to-back regional runner-up and regional titles in basketball. As of the 2013 season, the varsity girls' basketball had won a Virginia state record 84 consecutive games and became the first school in state history to win three consecutive state championships.

== Notable alumni ==
- Erick Green (born 1991), basketball player in the Israeli Basketball Premier League
- Nazeeh Johnson (born 1998), safety for the Kansas City Chiefs and 2022 Super Bowl LVII Champion
- Alex Limoges (born 1997), center for the Washington Capitals and Hershey Bears

== See also ==
- Frederick County Public Schools
- Frederick County, Virginia
