= Sherando High School =

Public secondary school, Frederick County, Virginia

Coordinates: 39°4′30.8″N 78°11′37.4″W

Location
- 185 South Warrior Drive; Stephens City, Virginia 22655; United States

Information
- Funding type: Public
- Opened: 1993
- School district: Frederick County Public Schools
- Principal: Karen McCoy
- Teaching staff: 114.25 (on an FTE basis)
- Grades: 9-12
- Enrollment: 1,666 (2022–23)
- Student to teacher ratio: 14.58
- Colors: Red, black, and white
- Slogan: Where One Person Can Make a Difference
- Team name: Warriors
- Website: https://shs.frederickcountyschoolsva.net/

Sherando High School is a public secondary school within Frederick County, Virginia, United States, and is part of Frederick County Public Schools. The school is located east of the town of Stephens City.

== History ==
Sherando High School was opened in August 1993 as the second high school in Frederick County. It was built to help alleviate crowding at James Wood High School, the sole high school in the county at the time. A third high school, Millbrook, was added to the system in 2003.

=== Accreditation ===
Sherando High School is a fully accredited high school based on its performance on the Standards of Learning tests in Virginia.

== Students ==
As of 2020–2021 the student body was 71% White, 16% Hispanic, 5.7% two or more races, 4.9% Black, 1.9% Asian, and less than 1.0% Native Hawaiian/Pacific Islander.

Certain sophomores and juniors are eligible for admission to Mountain Vista Governor's School.

== Athletics ==
The school mascot is a warrior. The sports teams currently play in the AA Northwestern District and Region II.

== Notable alumni ==
- James "Clayster" Eubanks, Esports professional
- Grant Golden, college basketball player for the Richmond Spiders, did not graduate, transferred from Sherando after his sophomore year
- Kelley Washington, NFL wide receiver for the San Diego Chargers

== Band ==
The band has received the VBODA Virginia Honor Band recognition a total of 23 times. They first earned it in 1993–94, and they most recently earned it in 2024–2025.
