= James Wood High School =

Coordinates: 39°12′51.6″N 78°10′56.9″W

High School

Location
- 161 Apple Pie Ridge Road; Winchester, Virginia 22603; United States

Information
- Type: Public high school
- Established: 1950; 76 years ago
- Principal: Shelly Andrews
- Grades: 9-12
- Enrollment: 1,437 (2022-23)
- Schedule type: Block
- Campus: Suburban
- Colors: Navy Blue & Gold
- Athletics conference: AAAA Northwestern District
- Mascot: Colonels
- Website: https://jwh.frederickcountyschoolsva.net/

James Wood High School is located at the northern tip of the Shenandoah Valley in Winchester, Virginia and is a part of the Frederick County Public School system. It is located at 161 Apple Pie Ridge Road.

James Wood High School was established in 1950 on Amherst Street as the high school for Frederick County, Virginia. It combined the students of five other high schools in the county: Gainesboro, Gore, Stonewall, Stephens City, and Middletown.

James Wood High School owes its name to a Revolutionary War colonel, James Wood, who was also governor of Virginia from 1796 to 1799. As Frederick County grew, the need for a larger school became evident. In 1981, the "Ridge Campus", on Apple Pie Ridge Road, was opened. Between 1981 and 1993, James Wood High School operated two campuses serving 9th and 10th grade students at the "Amherst Campus" and 11th and 12th grade students at the "Ridge Campus", offering busing for students between the two campuses for some classes (band, choir, upper level science classes, etc.). After the opening of Sherando High School in 1993, all grades of James Wood High School were consolidated to the Ridge Campus and the Amherst Campus became James Wood Middle School.

In June 2024, Ronda Gross, wife of former principal Samuel Gross, was prosecuted for embezzling funds from the school's baseball diamond club.

== Athletics ==
James Wood plays in the AAAA Northwestern District. Its mascot is the Colonel, and the school colors are blue and gold. Since the opening of the school in 1950, the Colonels have earned five state championships; boys' cross country (1968), football (1970), boys' cross country (2002), girls' doubles tennis (2008 and 2009), and volleyball (2022 and 2023), as well as state runner-up titles and regional championships in various sports. The 2006 season was the school's first winning season in football in 25 years. D.C. United defender Devon McTavish graduated from James Wood. The football program re-hired Walter Barr, who coached the team to its only state championship in 1970, for another stint as football coach in 2005. From 2005-2007, he amassed a record of 16-15 before retiring. Michael Bolin replaced him prior to the 2008 season and went 26-29 through the 2012 season. Running back Brock Lockhart was named All-State Honorable Mention in 2009 with 2,016 rushing yards and 21 touchdowns. Bolin resigned in December 2012 and was replaced on March 11, 2013, by Mark McHale, who went 13-28 over four seasons before resigning. On June 1, 2017, Ryan Morgan was announced as McHale's successor.

== Band ==
The Virginia Honor Band recognition and award was the result of a project and survey assigned to Vincent Tornello (Charlottesville Rig School) in the spring of 1979 by incoming Virginia Band & Orchestra Directors Association President Daniel Schoemmell (James Wood High School). The survey was in conjunction with the establishment of a state marching band festival. Bands achieving superior ratings at the state marching festival and district concert festival were to be recognized with the highest honor that can be bestowed upon bands by the VBODA, Virginia Honor Band.

The James Wood band has been recognized as a Virginia Honor Band 13 times. Their first award was in 1982–83, and their most recent was 1996–97. They won the award 11 times under the direction of Daniel Schoemmell, once under the direction of Sam Elson, and once under the direction of Jeffery Rutherford.
