= Middletown Historic District (Middletown, Virginia) =

Historic district in Virginia, United States

- U.S. National Register of Historic Places
- U.S. Historic district
- Virginia Landmarks Register
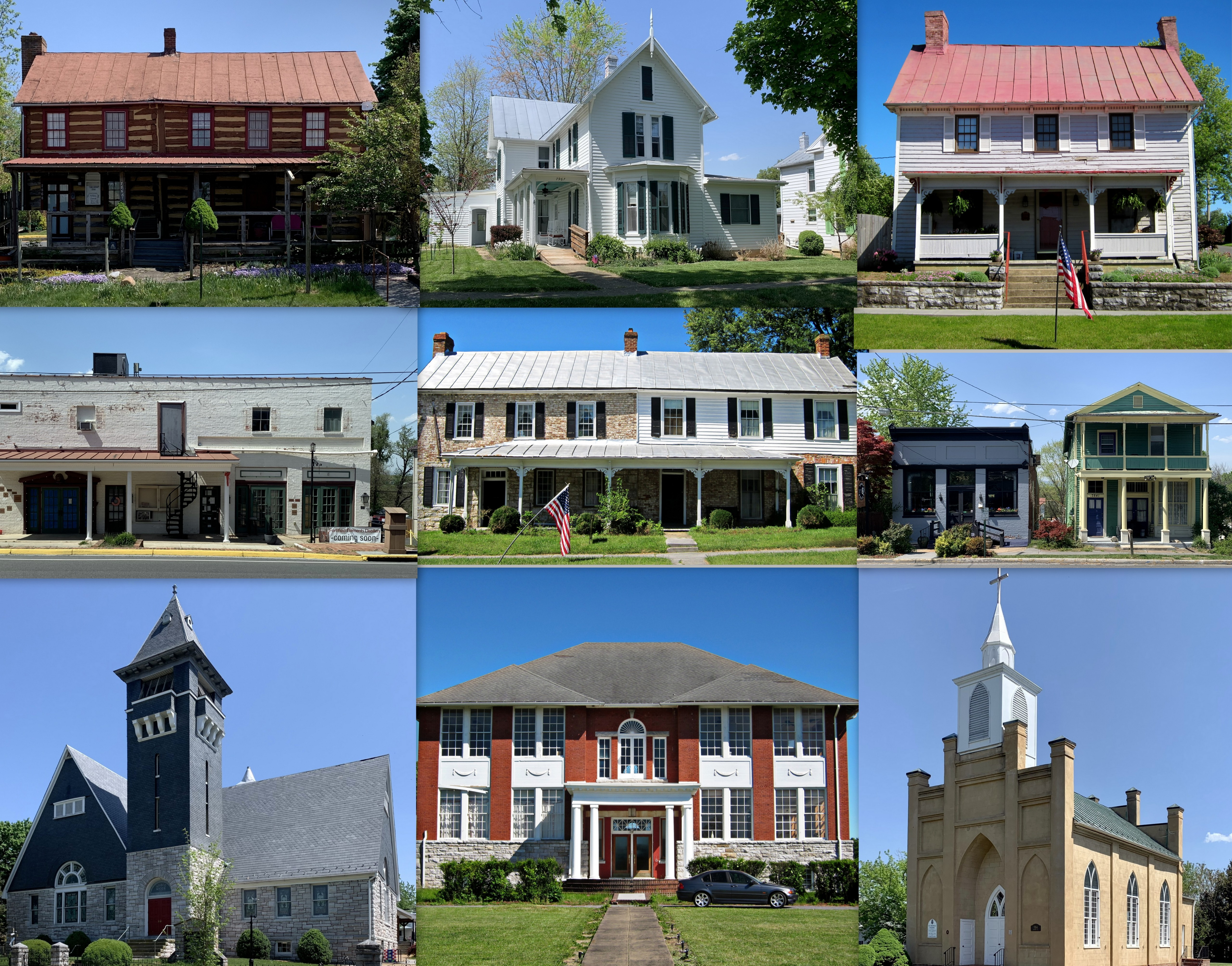
- From left to right on each row: Jacob Brookover House, Andrews House, Jacob Danner House, former Wayside Theatre, former Larrick's Tavern, Bailey House and former Middletown State Bank, Grace United Methodist Church, former Middletown School, St. Thomas Chapel
- Location: Bounded by Main Street, Church Street, Senseney Avenue, First Street, Sixth Street, Middletown, Virginia, United States
- Area: 100 acres (40 ha)
- Built: 1750–1950
- Architectural style: Greek Revival, Gothic Revival, et al.
- NRHP reference No.: 03000566
- VLR No.: 034-5001

Significant dates
- Added to NRHP: June 23, 2003
- Designated VLR: March 19, 2003

The Middletown Historic District is a national historic district located in Middletown, Virginia. It originally encompassed 234 contributing properties, the majority of which are residential buildings and their associated outbuildings. The boundaries of the historic district are approximately Church Street, Senseney Avenue, and First through Sixth Streets, except for a portion of Main Street that ends just south of Reliance Road (Route 627).

The non-residential historic structures include four specialty shops, a former theater, four churches, the Town Hall, two former schools, three warehouses and an inn. Notable buildings include the former Middletown Mission Church (c. 1818), Grace United Methodist Church (1897), the former Mt. Zion Church (1880), the former Middletown School (1909), the Town Hall (1880), the Wayside Inn (1797), Larrick's Tavern (1750), the former Wayside Theatre (1946), and Lafolette House (1800). Located in the district and separately listed on the National Register of Historic Places (NRHP) and Virginia Landmarks Register (VLR) is St. Thomas Chapel (1837).

The present-day Middletown area began developing in the mid-18th century due to the Great Wagon Road that brought settlers and commerce to the Shenandoah Valley. When the Virginia General Assembly formally established Middletown in 1796, there were already many residential and commercial buildings in the area. The town continued to develop thanks to the Valley Turnpike, present-day Main Street/U.S. Route 11, which connected the town to nearby Newtown (Stephens City) and Strasburg.

During the 19th century Middletown experienced continued residential and commercial growth until the Civil War. Many skirmishes took place in the area during Jackson's Valley campaign. The 1864 Battle of Cedar Creek, which began just south of the town limits before moving north through the town, resulted in many damaged properties. Commerce increased after a railroad track built in 1870 helped the town recover from the war's effects. Many of the town's historic houses were constructed in the late-19th century.

In the 20th century Route 11 was widened, utilities were installed, and the county's first high school opened in Middletown. Additional houses, warehouses, and commercial buildings, including a bank and movie theater, were constructed. A fire station built in the 1960s replaced historic houses, a trend that continued during the next few decades.

Due to the efforts of a local heritage group and with support from residents, a large portion of the town was listed as a historic district by the VLR and NRHP in 2003. Despite the historic designation, several contributing properties have been demolished. Town officials are hoping to avoid further demolition by encouraging residents to maintain their property and by preventing the construction of buildings that do not fit in with the character of the historic district.

== Geography ==
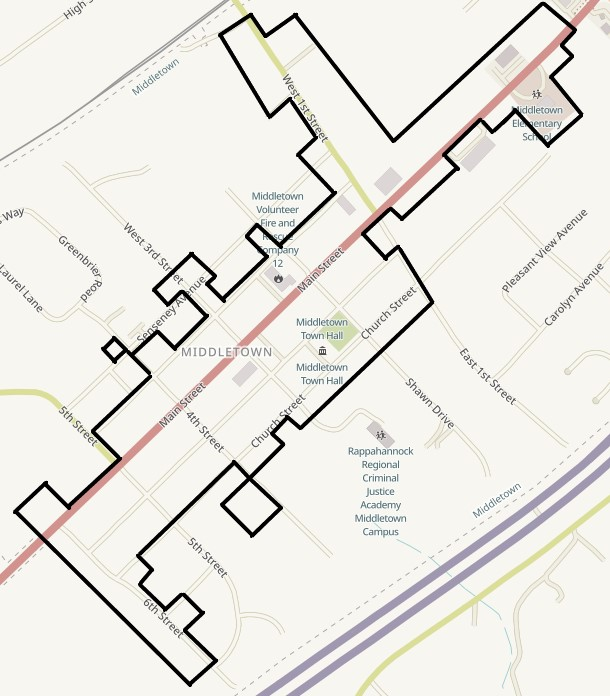
The historic district's boundaries

Middletown is located in southern Frederick County, Virginia, one of several counties in the Shenandoah Valley. The nearest towns are Stephens City, five miles (8 km) north, and Strasburg, five miles south. The town is bordered by Laurel Ridge Community College to the north, Interstate 81 to the east, and the Cedar Creek and Belle Grove National Historical Park to the south.

The historic district encompasses approximately 100 acres (40.4 ha), including the town's original 60 acres (24.3 ha), and additional properties on Main Street, north of First Street (Route 627), stretching almost to Reliance Road. The historic district is centered around Main Street, the portion of U.S. Route 11 located in the town, which runs southwest to northeast. The other streets in the historic district running southwest to northeast are Church Street, which is south of Main Street, and Senseney Avenue, located north of Main Street. The streets running northwest to southeast are First through Sixth Streets. There are also alleys running parallel to the streets which are included in the historic district's boundaries.

== History ==
=== 17th and 18th centuries ===
Present-day Middletown was part of the Fairfax Grant, a 17th-century land grant by King Charles II, encompassing a portion of colonial Virginia. The Van Meter brothers, who had acquired a 40,000-acre (16,187 ha) portion of this grant, later conveyed the land to German immigrant Jost Hite in 1731. During the next few decades, a 2,168-acre (877 ha) portion of this grant was conveyed to various men, ending with Dr. Peter Senseney, who acquired it in several transactions beginning in 1776. He moved to nearby Winchester and left the land for his children to maintain. Clockmaker Jacob Danner was tasked with surveying the area, then known as Senseney Town, and plotting 126 half-acre (0.2 ha) lots to establish a town. Middletown, possibly named because it was halfway between Newtown (later renamed Stephens City) and Strasburg, was established on May 4, 1796, by the Virginia General Assembly. It was chartered by the Frederick County government in 1796, becoming the third town established in the county.

The town was centered around the Great Wagon Road, later renamed Valley Turnpike, and now known as U.S. Route 11. The portion passing through Middletown, present-day Main Street, was designed to be wider than standard streets to accommodate commercial traffic. Commercial buildings, including the Wayside Inn (7783 Main Street; originally known as Larrick's Hotel and Wilkinson's Tavern) and Larrick's Tavern (7793 Main Street), were built in the 18th century. Houses built on Main Street during this time include the Jacob Danner House (7846 Main Street), Cirrani House (7896 Main Street), and Hoffman House (7827 Main Street). The Weaver-Jenkins House (7805 Church Street) and George Wright House (7845 Church Street) also date to the 18th century.

=== 19th century ===
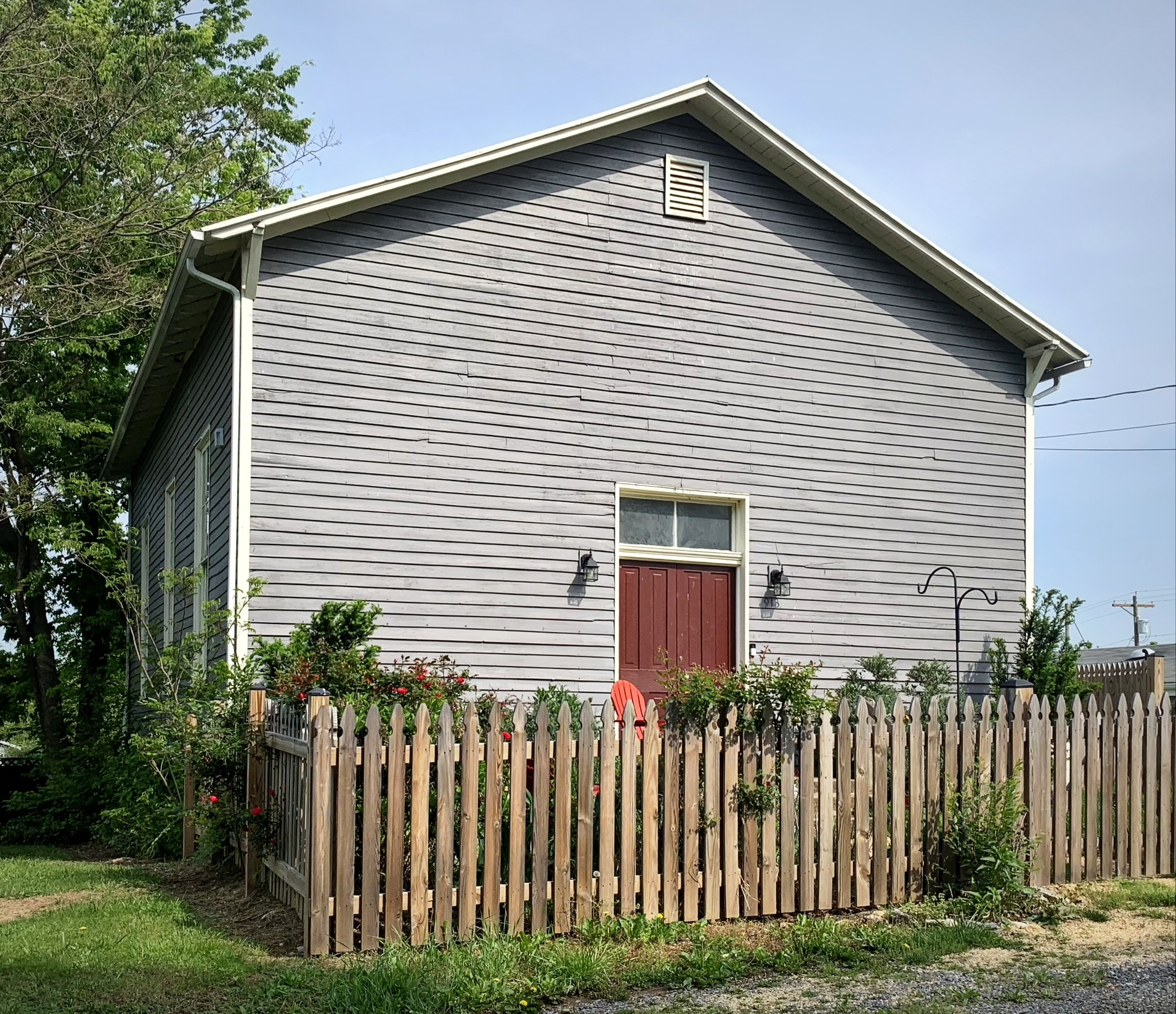
The former Mt. Zion Methodist Church at 7913 Senseney Avenue was built in 1880 and converted into a residence in 1992.

Less than half of the lots were sold by 1804 when Senseney died. Many of these lots were conveyed to his widow and children. Danner continued assisting the town's development, serving as the community leader until his death in 1850. During his stewardship local churches were founded, businesses continued to open, and two schools operated, all while the population slowly increased. A Methodist church for white residents was built at present-day 7893 Senseney Avenue in 1818 and later given to the town's African American residents, who renamed it the Colored People's Church. The Colored People's Church congregation later moved to nearby 7913 Senseney Avenue which was named Mt. Zion Methodist Church.

Most of the residences built in the early-19th century were log houses, including the Jacob Brookover House (7868 Main Street) and the houses at 7930 and 7952 Main Street. Many of these log houses were eventually covered with weatherboard, stucco, or brick, the latter beginning in the 1830s. The turnpike was paved in 1834, bringing additional commerce through Middletown and further increasing the population. St. Thomas Episcopal Church, which included members of the Hite family, was founded in 1834. The congregation built the Gothic Revival St. Thomas Chapel (7854 Church Street) in 1837. The white Methodist congregation built a brick church in 1852 on the corner of Main and present-day Third Streets, which has since been demolished.

During the Civil War, the Shenandoah Valley was the site of many battles. Soldiers traveled up and down the turnpike between Winchester and points south, with several bloody battles taking place in and around Middletown. Buildings in the town were often hit with artillery. Confederate soldiers used St. Thomas Chapel as a hospital until Union soldiers arrived and kicked them out. Union soldiers used the church as a stable and burned most of the interior. The last major battle to take place in the area, just south of the town limits, was the Battle of Cedar Creek. Fighting took place around the Belle Grove Plantation and Monte Vista before moving north through the town. Middletown slowly recovered after the war, with commerce increasing after a railroad track was built around 1870 between Winchester and Strasburg.

The town was incorporated in 1878. A town council was established and J. W. Rhodes served as the first mayor. These new local officials redrew the town's plats, changed the address number system, and renamed streets, except for Main Street. Many of the surviving buildings in the historic district were built in the late-19th century, representing various architectural styles. Folk Victorian, Greek Revival, Colonial Revival, Queen Anne, and Italiante houses were built, along with additional vernacular buildings, which had been present since the town's beginnings. A log cabin school that stood on Church Street from around 1800 was demolished in 1880 and replaced with the first Middletown Public School (7875 Church Street). During the last decade of the 19th century the Methodist church was replaced with an imposing Romanesque Revival building (7882 Main Street) and the town's first bank and only historic brick commercial building, Middletown State Bank (7843 Main Street), opened.

=== 20th century ===
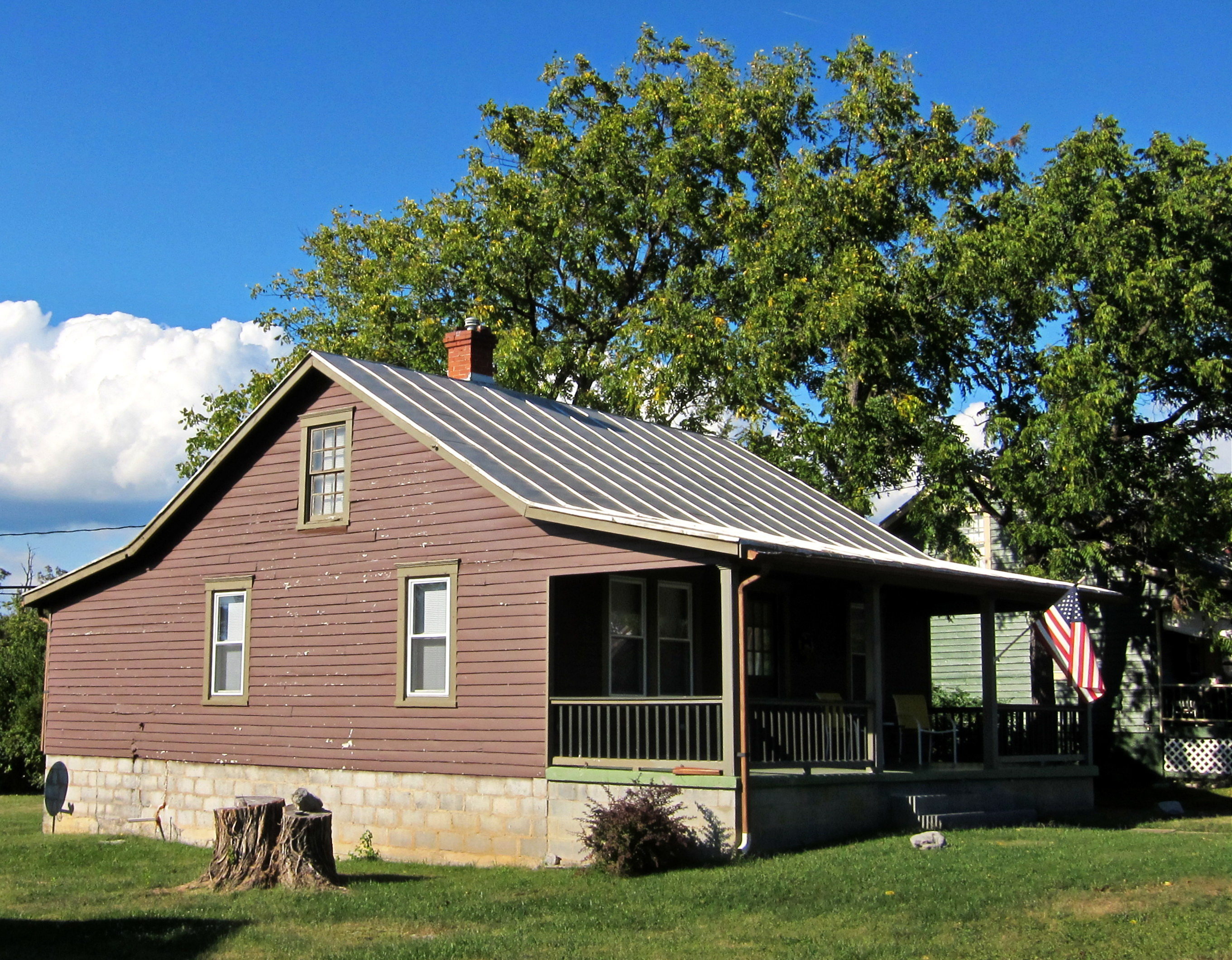
7713 Main Street was built in 1930 as one of eleven bungalows for American Viscose Corporation employees. Several of these houses were later demolished.

Electricity and phone service arrived in Middletown in the early 20th century, and when Route 11 was widened, none of the properties fronting Main Street were demolished because buildings had been constructed further away from the road in anticipation of future development. The town's first auto repair shop, Stubley's Garage (no address listed; between 7957 and 7969 Main Street) was built around this time. A new Middletown School (7690 Main Street, formerly 7688) was built in 1909, becoming the county's first high school and one of the first agricultural high schools in Virginia. The schoolmaster lived in an American Foursquare house (7700 Main Street) that is located next door. African American children attended the segregated Senseney-Middletown Colored Elementary School (7883 Senseney Avenue). The former school on Church Street was deeded to the town. One of the requirements in the deed was that the Independent Order of Odd Fellows (IOOF) would be allowed to meet on the second floor.

Residential buildings constructed in the 1920s include an American Craftsman house (7895 Main Street), a bungalow (7935 Church Street), and the vernacular 2435 First Street, which later served as a nursing home. A warehouse (2325 First Street) that was later home to Route 11 Potato Chips was built around the same time. Among the buildings constructed in the 1930s and 1940s were a dance hall and eleven bungalows for employees of the American Viscose Corporation in nearby Front Royal. The dance hall and some of the bungalows were later demolished.

There were several significant fires in Middletown in the early-20th century. Following a devastating fire that took place on Main Street in 1941, residents and town officials saw the need for a volunteer fire company, which was formed two years later. In 1946 the Bordon-Lee Theater (7853 Main Street), which played films, was built on the site of the former Shenandoah Normal School, which had been recently destroyed in a fire. Fifteen years later the Bordon-Lee building began housing a live theater company and was later renamed the Wayside Theatre.

A water tower was built on Church Street in 1950 followed by the installation of natural gas mains in the late 1950s. A central sewer system and connections to Winchester's water supply lines were added in the 1960s. In 1962 the fire station was built with an expansion added 30 years later. The station replaced two historic houses, which were two of many that were demolished in the 20th century and replaced with commercial properties. The IOOF deeded its interest of the former school on Church Street to the town in 1965. The building now houses the Town Hall. The Middletown Police Department is located in a commercial building constructed in 1989. A fire destroyed a large portion of the Wayside Inn in the 1980s, but it was later restored. The town's water tower was demolished in the 1990s.

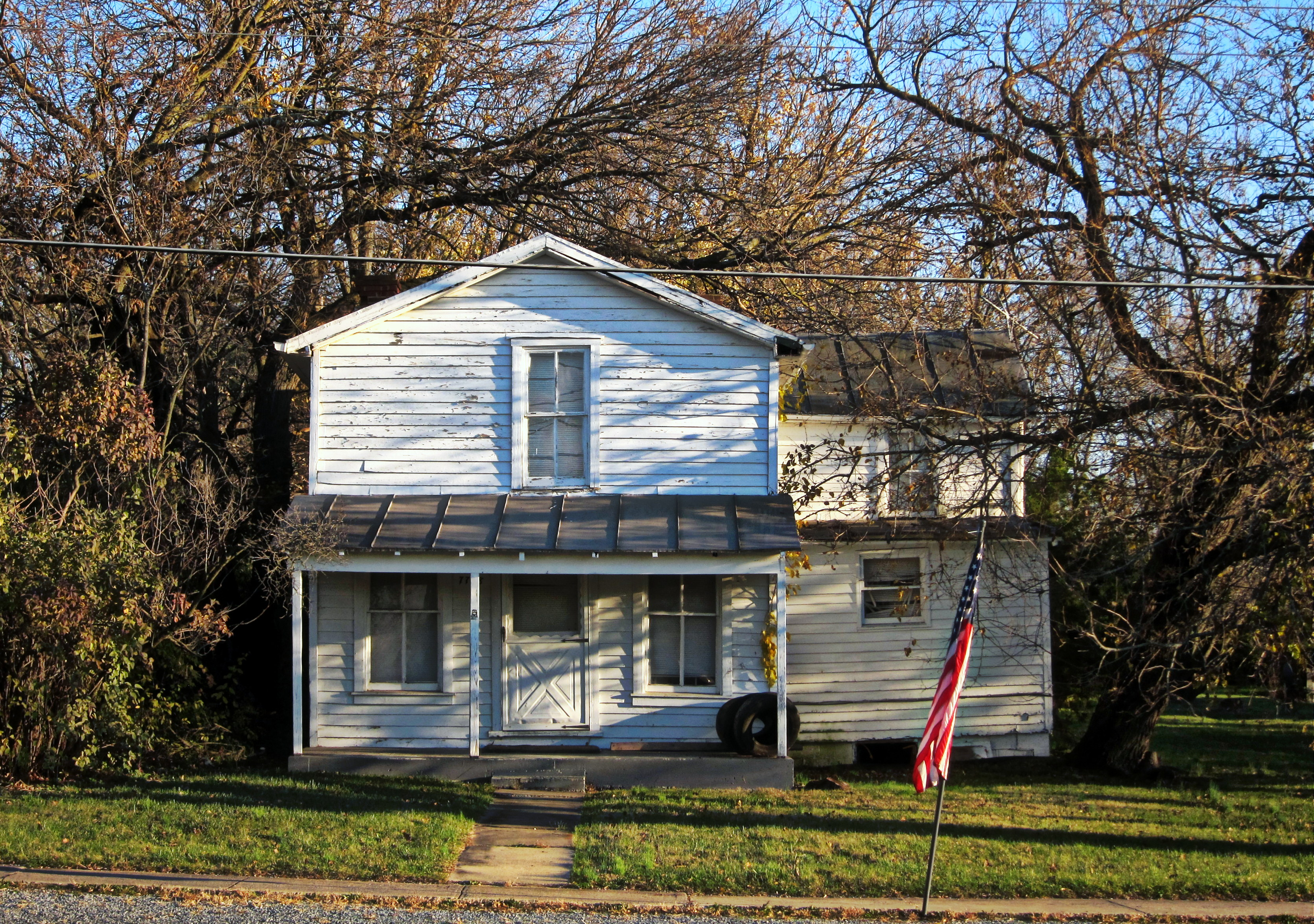
The Evans House at 7708 Main Street was demolished after the historic district was created.

=== 21st century ===
In 2002 a survey asked residents if they wanted to create a historic district to recognize and preserve the town's remaining historic structures. Ninety percent of residents voted in favor of creating the historic district. The preservation effort was spearheaded by the Middletown Heritage Society, formed in 1999. Following thorough research of the town's structures and history, the Middletown Historic District was added to the Virginia Landmarks Register on March 19, 2003, and the National Register of Historic Places (NRHP) on June 23, 2003.

Despite the historic district designation, there have been 13 historic buildings and numerous outbuildings demolished since 2003. Despite some opposition, a Dollar General store replaced the Rinker House (7695 Main Street), also known as the Cooper House, and its four contributing properties: a meat house, chicken coop, garage, and tool shed. The Evans House (7708 Main Street) was also demolished and replaced with two residential buildings. The Wayside Theatre closed in 2013, ending 50 years of live performances.

In the 2020s a proposed historic overlay district that would encompass 176 parcels in the town was met with opposition from some residents, who feared it would lead to property maintenance guidelines and reviews of any architectural changes to buildings. Town officials aim to establish an ordinance to preserve the historic district's remaining contributing buildings. Avoiding further demolition of historic buildings and demolition by neglect are top priorities, in addition to encouraging proper upkeep of buildings and streetscapes, and preventing commercial or industrial buildings that do not fit in with the character of the historic district. Despite this, in 2025 the property at 7745 Main Street was purchased by the town government for $158,000. The 19th-century house was demolished due to the cost it would take to repair the structure. Plans for the site include parking for the adjoining police station and access to town-owned land behind the property.

== Contributing properties ==
At the time the historic district was added to the NRHP and VLR there were 234 contributing properties, including houses, commercial buildings, churches, warehouses, and former schools, and 64 non-contributing properties. A large number of outbuildings are among the contributing properties, including barns, icehouses, chicken coops, and outhouses. Most of these are no longer used for their original purposes. Many of the houses feature large yards. Non-contributing properties include several houses, the fire station, one strip mall, two multi-family buildings, and four commercial buildings, including the police station. Most of these were built in the late-20th and early-21st centuries, or have been significantly altered.

=== Non-residential ===
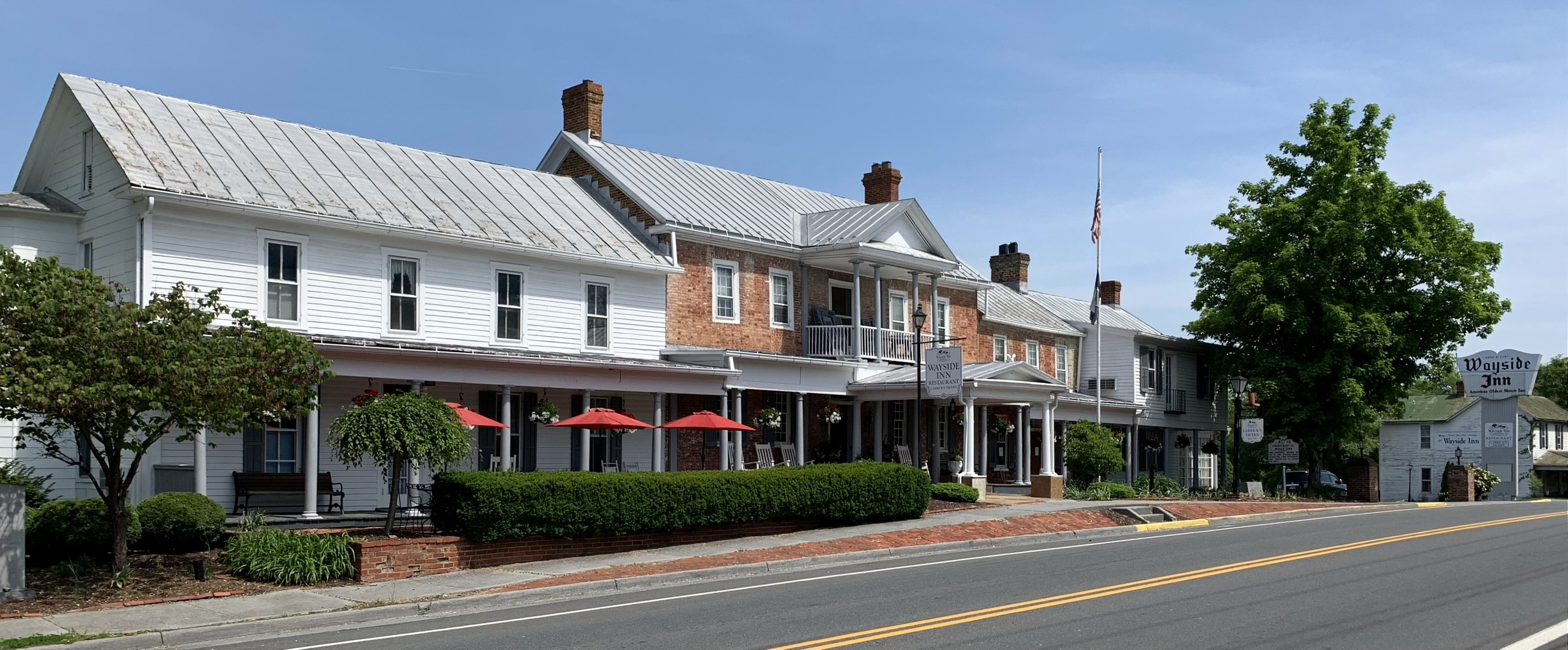
The oldest portion of the Wayside Inn at 7783 Main Street dates to 1797.

A large number of the historic district's contributing properties are located along Main Street. The most notable of these is the Wayside Inn (7783 Main Street), the oldest portion of which dates back to 1797 and features Colonial Revival details. The adjoining properties include Larrick's Tavern (7793 Main Street), built in the 1750s with Folk Victorian additions in the 19th century, and the vernacular former Wayside Inn office (7751 Main Street), built around 1870. Other imposing structures located along Main Street include the Romanesque Revival Grace United Methodist Church (7882 Main Street), built in 1897, the Colonial Revival former Middletown School (7690 Main Street), built in 1909, and the vernacular former Wayside Theatre (7853 Main Street), built in 1946 as the Bordon-Lee Theater.

The only contributing property in the historic district individually listed on the NRHP is St. Thomas Chapel (7854 Church Street), a small Gothic Revival church built in 1837. The only other non-residential building on Church Street is the vernacular Town Hall (7875 Church Street), built in 1880 as a school and modified in the 1960s. Historic buildings on Senseney Avenue include the vernacular former Middletown Missionary Church (7893 Senseney Avenue; previously a Methodist church), built in 1818, the vernacular former Mt. Zion Methodist Church (7913 Senseney Avenue), built sometime between 1880 and 1900, and the vernacular former Senseney-Middletown Colored Elementary School (7883 Senseney Avenue), built in 1880. Other non-residential contributing buildings, all vernacular, include the former Middletown State Bank (7843 Main Street), former Miller Store (7805 Main Street), former Route 11 Potato Chips warehouse (2325 First Street), former Larrick's Store (2465 First Street), and a warehouse (2493 First Street).

=== Residential ===
==== Main Street ====
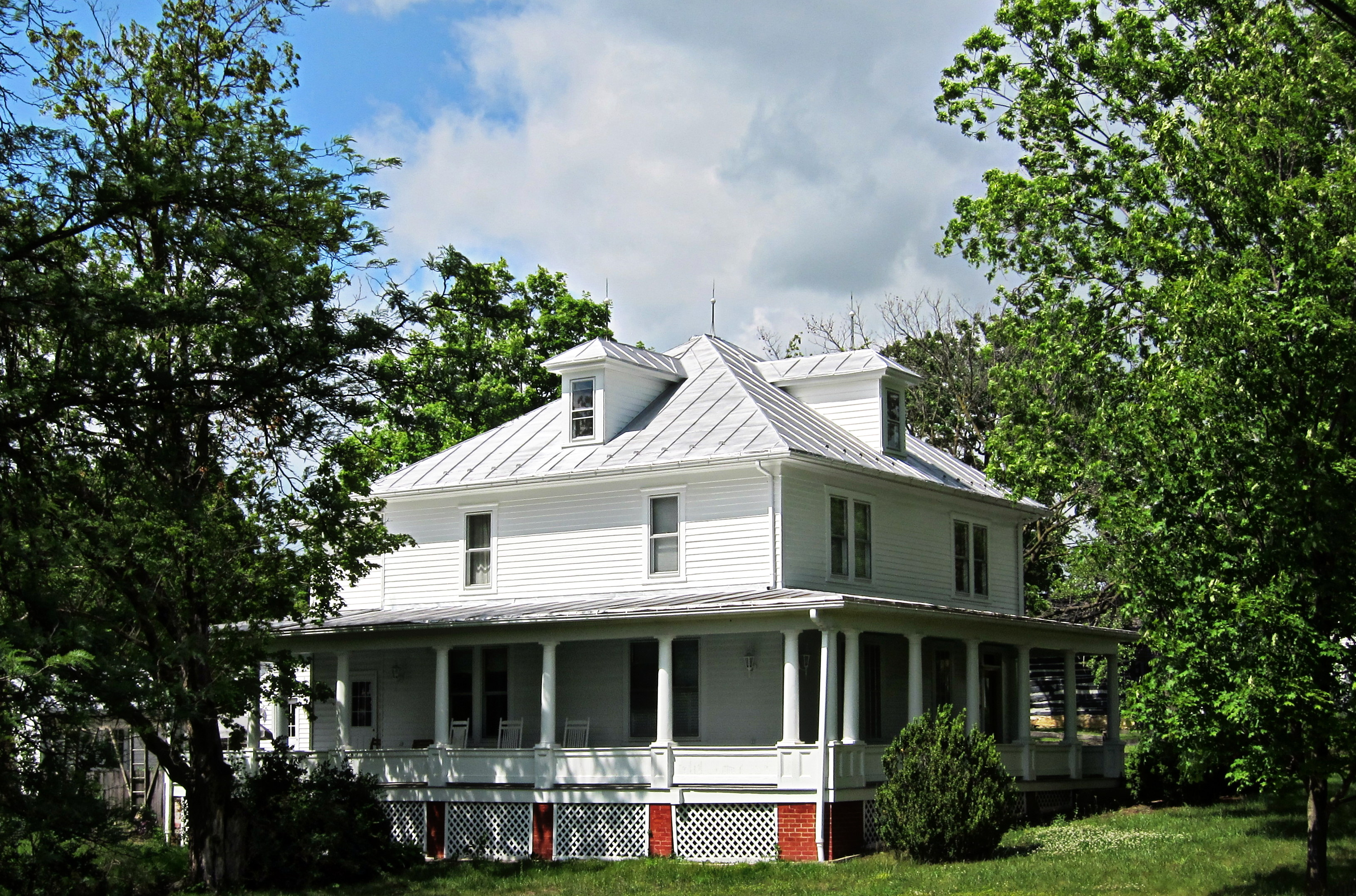
The American Foursquare 8049 Main Street, historically known as the Campbell House, was built in the early 20th century.

The majority of contributing properties in the historic district are residential and many include contributing outbuildings. One of the oldest buildings on Main Street is the Jacob Danner House (7846 Main Street), also known as the Wiley-Crouse House, which was built as a log cabin in the late 18th century and later renovated with vernacular and Folk Victorian details. The oldest portion of the vernacular and Greek Revival Cirrani House (7896 Main Street) was built in 1779. The vernacular Hoffman House (7827 Main Street) was built around 1797. During the Civil War, a cannonball passed through one of the house's walls. The log cabin Jacob Brookover House (7868 Main Street) and the stucco-covered log cabin Munzing-Cave House (7969 Main Street) were built around 1800. The vernacular Jacob Rodes House (7828 Main Street), featuring Greek Revival details, was also built around 1800. A Folk Victorian style house at 7927 Main Street was built in the 1820s.

Residences on Main Street built in the late-19th and early 20th centuries include the Folk Victorian James L. Willey House (8034 Main Street) and Will Willey House (8026 Main Street), American Foursquare former schoolmaster's house (7700 Main Street) and Campbell House (8049 Main Street), the Queen Anne 7772 Main Street, the vernacular Hite-Edmonson House (7841 Main Street) and former Gladys Lantzer Nursing Home (7913 Main Street), and 7701–7703 Main Street, one of the town's two historic duplexes. Several vernacular bungalows built in the 1930s and 1940s are located between First Street and Reliance Road.

==== Church Street and Senseney Avenue ====
There are 25 historic houses on Church Street. A log cabin (7805 Church Street), historically known as the Weaver-Jenkins House or Caroline Jenkins Cabin, was built around 1790 and is the oldest building on the street. Other houses on Church Street that were originally log cabins include the Gordon-Sperry House (7948 Church Street), built sometime between 1820 and 1840, and the McDonald House (7945 Church Street), built in the mid-19th century. The vernacular George Wright House (7845 Church Street) was built in the 1790s. Early-19th century houses on Church Street that are made of brick or wood frame include the vernacular 7822 Church Street and Carper House (7813 Church Street). Houses built in the late-19th century include the vernacular 7825 Church Street, the Folk Victorian 7894 Church Street and Alfred Wiley House (7957 Church Street), and the Queen Anne Dr. G. W. Larrick House (7919 Church Street). The vernacular Andrews House (7967 Church Street), built in the 1890s, originally served as the parsonage for the nearby Methodist church.

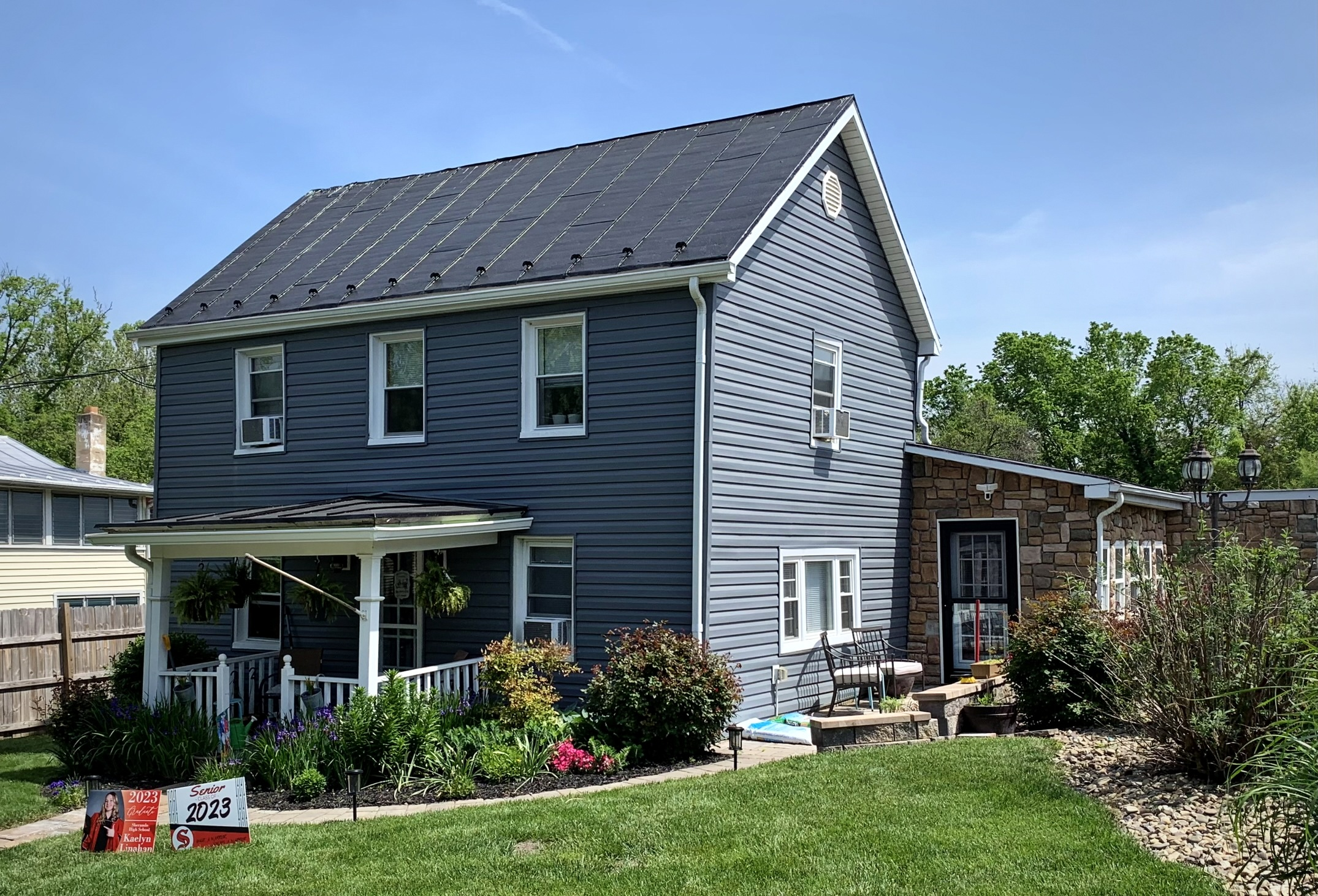
The Lafolette House at 2458 First Street was built in 1800.

Ten historic houses are located on Senseney Avenue. The vernacular 7816 Senseney Avenue and 7826 Senseney Avenue are the oldest houses, both with log sections dating to around 1800. Another early-19th century house is the vernacular 7942 Senseney Avenue. The remaining houses are vernacular and were built between 1880 and 1920, except for the American Craftsman 7857 Senseney Avenue.

==== First through Sixth Streets ====
There are 11 historic houses on First Street, the oldest being the vernacular Lafolette House (2458 First Street). The oldest portion is a log structure built around 1800. Other houses include the Folk Victorian Ridings House (2349 First Street) and 2371 First Street, the American Craftsman 2385 First Street, and three Colonial Revival houses: 2416 First Street, 2432 First Street, and 2434 First Street. The remaining houses are vernacular. There are two contributing houses on Fourth Street, 2190 Fourth Street and 2191 Fourth Street. Both are vernacular and were built in the late-19th century. There is one contributing house on Fifth Street. The vernacular house, 2310 Fifth Street, was built around 1852 and originally faced Main Street. It was moved to its current location around 1940. There are three contributing houses on Sixth Street. The Wright House (2239 Sixth Street), also known as Maplewood, was built in 1856 and is the town's only example of Italianate architecture. The other houses are the vernacular 2149 Sixth Street, built around 1900, and the Folk Victorian 2150 Sixth Street, built in the late-19th century.

== List of contributing buildings ==
Rating	Image	Address	Year	Style	Comments
Contributing		7800 Church Street; 39°1′43.41″N 78°16′35.36″W	1900–1930	American Craftsman	
Contributing		7805 Church Street; 39°1′43.08″N 78°16′35.91″W	1804	Vernacular	Historically known as the Caroline Jenkins Cabin or the Weaver-Jenkins House. It is believed to have been built in 1804 by the original owner, Ezer Ellis.
Contributing		7813 Church Street; 39°1′42.5″N 78°16′36.46″W	1820–1830	Vernacular	Historically known as the Carper House.
Contributing		7822 Church Street; 39°1′42.21″N 78°16′35.94″W	1830/1855	Vernacular	Built in two sections, one around 1830 and the second around 1855.
Contributing		7825 Church Street; 39°1′42.63″N 78°16′35.77″W	1880–1910	Vernacular	
Contributing		7845 Church Street; 39°1′40.81″N 78°16′38.9″W	1790s	Vernacular	Historically known as the George Wright House. Built in the 1790s with an addition between 1820 and 1840.
Individually listed		7854 Church Street; 39°1′40.02″N 78°16′40.31″W	1837	Gothic Revival	St. Thomas Chapel, Middletown's Episcopal church for almost 100 years. Used as a hospital and stable during the Civil War. Listed on the National Register of Historic Places and Virginia Landmarks Register in 1973.
Contributing		7874 Church Street; 39°1′42.5″N 78°16′36.46″W	1870–1890	Vernacular	
Contributing		7875 Church Street; 39°1′38.64″N 78°16′41.57″W	1880	Vernacular	Served as a school from 1880 to 1908. Deeded by the International Order of Odd Fellows to the town government in 1965. Renovated and serves as the Middletown Town Hall.
Contributing		7883 Church Street; 39°1′37.78″N 78°16′42.86″W	1890–1910	Folk Victorian	
Contributing		7884 Church Street; 39°1′38.08″N 78°16′42.37″W	1880–1910	Vernacular	
Contributing		7893 Church Street; 39°1′36.39″N 78°16′44.62″W	1870–1900	Vernacular	Historically known as the Margaret J. Rogers House.
Contributing		7894 Church Street; 39°1′36.09″N 78°16′42.87″W	1870–1890	Folk Victorian	
Contributing		7907 Church Street; 39°1′35.86″N 78°16′45.39″W	1870–1900	Vernacular	
Contributing		7916 Church Street; 39°1′36.27″N 78°16′44.97″W	1870–1900	Vernacular	Historically known as the R. C. Stickley House. Built as the parsonage for nearby St. Thomas Chapel.
Contributing		7919 Church Street; 39°1′35.03″N 78°16′46.32″W	1882	Queen Anne	Historically known as the Dr. G. W. Larrick House. Built in 1882, with later additions and modifications in 1900, 1968, and 1978. Some of the house's Gothic-style windows were originally in the now-demolished Methodist church built in 1853.
Contributing		7935 Church Street; 39°1′33.4″N 78°16′48.57″W	1920–1940	Vernacular	
Contributing		7945 Church Street; 39°1′32.99″N 78°16′48.98″W	Mid-19th century	Vernacular	Historically known as the McDonald House. Built in the mid-19th century with additions between 1910 and 1930.
Contributing		7948 Church Street; 39°1′32.61″N 78°16′48.63″W	1820–1840	Vernacular	Historically known as the Gordon-Sperry House. Built between 1820 and 1840 as a log cabin with later modifications in 1870.
Contributing		7957 Church Street; 39°1′32.07″N 78°16′50.36″W	1895	Vernacular	Historically known as the Alfred Wiley House.
Contributing		7967 Church Street; 39°1′31.97″N 78°16′50.55″W	1890–1900	Vernacular	Historically known as the Andrews House. Built between 1890 and 1900, with later additions in the 1970s, and originally served as the parsonage for the nearby Methodist church.
Contributing		7995 Church Street; 39°1′29.44″N 78°16′53.65″W	1890–1910	Vernacular	
Contributing		8007 Church Street; 39°1′28.87″N 78°16′54.45″W	1880–1910	Vernacular	
Demolished		8019 Church Street; 39°1′28″N 78°16′55.9″W	1880–1910	Vernacular	
Contributing		8022 Church Street; 39°1′27.22″N 78°16′56.48″W	1890–1920	Vernacular	Historically known as the Lock [Lauck] House or Dicks House.
Contributing		8030 Church Street; 39°1′26.6″N 78°16′57.61″W	1846	Vernacular	Historically known as the Cooley House or the Achilles G. Willey House.
Contributing		8043 Church Street; 39°1′26.68″N 78°16′57.31″W	1870–1910	Queen Anne	Historically known as the Emma Andrews House.
Contributing		2325 First Street; 39°1′48.3″N 78°16′38.9″W	1930s	Vernacular	Warehouse that later served as the first Route 11 Potato Chips factory.
Contributing		2349 First Street; 39°1′51.47″N 78°16′42.01″W	1870–1890	Folk Victorian	Historically known as the Ridings House.
Contributing		2371 First Street; 39°1′52.46″N 78°16′42.39″W	1880–1910	Folk Victorian	Built between 1880 and 1910 with modifications between 1910–1930 and 1940–1960.
Contributing		2376 First Street; 39°1′52.16″N 78°16′41.93″W	1880–1910	Vernacular	
Contributing		2385 First Street; 39°1′53.08″N 78°16′43.05″W	1930s	American Craftsman	
Demolished		2408 First Street; 39°1′53.3″N 78°16′43″W	1915–1930	Vernacular	
Contributing		2416 First Street; 39°1′53.75″N 78°16′43.82″W	1900–1920	Colonial Revival	
Contributing		2432-2434 First Street; 39°1′55.43″N 78°16′44.75″W	1910–1930	Colonial Revival	One of two duplexes that are contributing properties to the historic district.
Contributing		2435 First Street; 39°1′56.35″N 78°16′45.63″W	1920–1940	Vernacular	
Contributing		2457 First Street; 39°1′57.87″N 78°16′46.98″W	1890–1920	Vernacular	
Contributing		2458 First Street; 39°1′56.72″N 78°16′45.77″W	1800	Vernacular	Historically known as the Lafolette House.
Contributing		2465 First Street; 39°1′58.84″N 78°16′47.83″W	1880–1910	Vernacular	Historically known as the Klines Store, Carpers Store, or Larricks Store.
Contributing		2470 First Street; 39°1′56.77″N 78°16′45.8″W	1890–1920	Vernacular	
Demolished		2493 First Street; 39°2′00.5″N 78°16′48″W	1900–1930	Vernacular	
Contributing		2190 Fourth Street; 39°1′31.67″N 78°16′48.46″W	1870–1900	Vernacular	Built between 1870 and 1900 with modifications in the 1970s.
Contributing		2191 Fourth Street; 39°1′30.51″N 78°16′46.27″W	1890–1910	Vernacular	
Contributing		2310 Fifth Street; 39°1′32.63″N 78°17′00.55″W	1852	Vernacular	Built around 1852 with modifications between 1920 and 1950. The house originally faced Main Street but was moved around 1940.
Contributing		2149 Sixth Street; 39°1′21.39″N 78°16′52.34″W	1890–1910	Vernacular	Built as a tenant house of nearby Maplewood.
Contributing		2150 Sixth Street; 39°1′22.08″N 78°16′53.21″W	1870–1900	Folk Victorian	
Contributing		2239 Sixth Street; 38°54′03.89″N 77°01′06.08″W	1856	Italianate	Historically known as Maplewood or the Wright House. Middletown's only example of Italianate architecture.
Contributing		7816 Senseney Avenue; 39°1′50.19″N 78°16′43.74″W	1800–1820	Vernacular	
Contributing		7826 Senseney Avenue; 39°1′49.51″N 78°16′44.73″W	1800–1830	Vernacular	Built between 1800 and 1830 with a second portion added between 1870 and 1910.
Contributing		7836 Senseney Avenue; 39°1′49.15″N 78°16′45.17″W	1910–1940	Vernacular	
Contributing		7844 Senseney Avenue; 39°1′47.87″N 78°16′46.76″W	1892	Vernacular	Historically known as the Ralph Carper House.
Contributing		7848 Senseney Avenue; 39°1′47.68″N 78°16′47.09″W	1890–1920	Vernacular	Historically known as the Lewis A. Gossard House.
Contributing		7857 Senseney Avenue; 39°1′47.42″N 78°16′47.72″W	1900–1930	American Craftsman	
Contributing		7883 Senseney Avenue; 39°1′44.14″N 78°16′51.65″W	1880	Vernacular	Served as the Senseney-Middletown Colored Elementary School from 1939 to 1960 and was later converted into a residence.
Contributing		7890 Senseney Avenue; 39°1′43.7″N 78°16′52.36″W	1890–1920	Vernacular	
Contributing		7893 Senseney Avenue; 39°1′43.41″N 78°16′52.55″W	1818	Vernacular	The former Middletown Missionary Church.
Contributing		7913 Senseney Avenue; 39°1′42.79″N 78°16′53.57″W	1880	Vernacular	The former Mt. Zion Methodist Church that was converted into a residence in 1992.
Contributing		7942 Senseney Avenue; 39°1′40.21″N 78°16′56.7″W	1810–1850	Vernacular	
Contributing		7948 Senseney Avenue; 39°1′40″N 78°16′57″W	1880–1910	Vernacular	
Contributing		7965 Senseney Avenue; 39°1′38.23″N 78°16′59.15″W	1880–1910	Vernacular	Historically known as the Mitchell House.
Contributing		7616 Main Street; 39°1′59.04″N 78°16′22.62″W	1941	Bungalow	One of eleven bungalows built for American Viscose Corporation employees.
Contributing		7624 Main Street; 39°1′58.38″N 78°16′23.25″W	1941	Bungalow	One of eleven bungalows built for American Viscose Corporation employees.
Demolished		7625 Main Street; 39°1′59.9″N 78°16′23.2″W	1935–1950	Vernacular	Historically known as the Dellinger House.
Demolished		7632 Main Street; 39°1′58.2″N 78°16′22.8″W	1941	Bungalow	One of eleven bungalows built for American Viscose Corporation employees.
Demolished		7640 Main Street; 39°1′57.6″N 78°16′23.1″W	1941	Bungalow	One of eleven bungalows built for American Viscose Corporation employees.
Demolished		7648 Main Street; 39°1′57.3″N 78°16′23.6″W	1941	Bungalow	One of eleven bungalows built for American Viscose Corporation employees.
Demolished		7656 Main Street; 39°1′56.6″N 78°16′23.3″W	1941	Bungalow	One of eleven bungalows built for American Viscose Corporation employees.
Demolished		7664 Main Street; 39°1′56.5″N 78°16′24.4″W	1941	Bungalow	One of eleven bungalows built for American Viscose Corporation employees.
Contributing		7665 Main Street; 39°1′58.34″N 78°16′23.33″W	1910–1930	American Craftsman	
Contributing		7690 Main Street; 39°1′52.91″N 78°16′24.29″W	1909	Colonial Revival	Middletown School from 1909 to 1984. Now serves as a private residence.
Demolished		7695 Main Street; 39°1′56.6″N 78°16′27.6″W	1890–1920	Colonial Revival	Historically known as the Rinker House or Cooper House.
Contributing		7700 Main Street; 39°1′54.19″N 78°16′28.85″W	1891	American Foursquare	Previously served as the Schoolmaster's House for the neighboring Middletown School.
Contributing		7701-7703 Main Street; 39°1′54.33″N 78°16′28.66″W	1880–1910	Vernacular	Perved served as a feed store and a restaurant. One of two duplexes that are contributing properties to the historic district.
Contributing		7705 Main Street; 39°1′53.87″N 78°16′29.37″W	1930–1950	Bungalow	One of eleven bungalows built for American Viscose Corporation employees.
Demolished		7708 Main Street; 39°1′52.86″N 78°16′29.1″W	1890–1910	Vernacular	Historically known as the Evans House.
Contributing		7709 Main Street; 39°1′53.91″N 78°16′29.35″W	1930	Bungalow	One of eleven bungalows built for American Viscose Corporation employees.
Contributing		7713 Main Street Middletown; 39°1′53.57″N 78°16′29.9″W	1930	Bungalow	One of eleven bungalows built for American Viscose Corporation employees.
Contributing		7723 Main Street; 39°1′52.42″N 78°01′31.1″W	1940	Vernacular	
Contributing		7729 Main Street; 39°1′51.98″N 78°16′31.76″W	1940	Bungalow	One of eleven bungalows built for American Viscose Corporation employees.
Demolished		7745 Main Street; 39°1′51.47″N 78°16′32.56″W	Mid-19th century	Folk Victorian	Built in the mid-19th century with modifications in the early 20th century. Demolished in 2025.
Contributing		7751 Main Street; 39°1′50.3″N 78°16′34.4″W	1870–1910	Vernacular	Previously served as office space for the Wayside Inn.
Contributing		7752 Main Street; 39°1′50.55″N 78°16′33.91″W	1880–1910	Vernacular	
Contributing		7760 Main Street; 39°1′49.88″N 78°16′34.95″W	1870–1900	Vernacular	Historically known as the Everly House.
Contributing		7772 Main Street; 39°1′48.29″N 78°16′34.86″W	1880–1910	Queen Anne	
Contributing		7780 Main Street; 39°1′48.01″N 78°16′37.04″W	1931	Colonial Revival	
Contributing		7783 Main Street; 39°1′48.82″N 78°16′36.6″W	1797	Vernacular	Wayside Inn. Oldest portion of the building dates to 1797. Later additions and renovations in the 19th and 20th centuries.
Contributing		7793 Main Street; 39°1′48.95″N 78°16′39.03″W	1750–1760	Vernacular	The former Larrick's Tavern. Oldest portion of the building dates to 1750–1760 with later modifications between 1780–1810 and 1870–1900.
Contributing		7805 Main Street; 39°1′45.94″N 78°16′39.18″W	1890	Vernacular	Historically known as the Catlett-Owings-Long House or the Miller Store.
Contributing		7820 Main Street; 39°1′50.3″N 78°16′40.2″W	1911–1915	Vernacular	
Contributing		7827 Main Street; 39°1′45.51″N 78°16′40.52″W	1797	Vernacular	Historically known as the Hoffman House. Believed to be built in 1797 by its first owner, Isaac Klotz, with later modifications between 1820 and 1840.
Contributing		7828 Main Street; 39°1′44.37″N 78°16′41.41″W	1800	Vernacular	Historically known as the Jacob Rodes House. Built around 1800 with later modifications between 1830–1850 and the early 20th century.
Contributing		7837 Main Street; 39°1′45.08″N 78°16′41.54″W	1890	Colonial Revival	Historically known as the Yates House or the Sherwood House.
Contributing		7840 Main Street; 39°1′44.29″N 78°16′42.67″W	1891	Vernacular	Historically known as the Danner House or the Bugarski House. Built in 1891 with modifications in the 20th century.
Contributing		7841 Main Street; 39°1′44.83″N 78°16′42.42″W	1880–1910	Vernacular	Historically known as the Hite-Edmonson House or the Bailey House.
Contributing		7843 Main Street; 39°1′45.46″N 78°16′43.73″W	1890	Vernacular	Middletown State Bank until 1967, when it merged with F&M (Farmers and Merchants) National Bank, later closing in 1985.
Contributing		7846 Main Street; 39°1′43.68″N 78°16′42.34″W	1780–1800	Vernacular	Historically known as the Jacob Danner House or the Wiley-Crouse House.
Contributing		7849 Main Street; 39°1′43.83″N 78°16′43.52″W	1880–1910	Vernacular	The building is composed of two structures that were combined: the former Rhodes Store and House, which later served as the post office, and the Goode House.
Contributing		7853 Main Street; 39°1′42.89″N 78°16′44.23″W	1946	Vernacular	The former Wayside Theatre. Built as a movie theater called the Bordon-Lee Theater or Middletown Movie Theater.
Contributing		7864 Main Street; 39°1′42.24″N 78°16′44.92″W	1870–1900	Vernacular	Historically known as the Edmonson House or the Mercer House.
Contributing		7868 Main Street; 39°1′42.38″N 78°16′45.52″W	1800	Vernacular	Historically known as the Jacob Brookover House or the Snyder House. Built around 1800 with additions and modifications between 1820–1840 and in 1970.
Contributing		7875 Main Street; 39°1′42.01″N 78°16′45.58″W	1870	Vernacular	
Contributing		7876 Main Street; 39°1′42.01″N 78°16′46.07″W	1880–1910	Vernacular	Historically known as the Ludwig House or the Furr House.
Demolished		7881 Main Street; 39°1′41.8″N 78°16′46.8″W	1900–1920	Vernacular	Historically known as the Mowery House.
Contributing		7882 Main Street; 39°1′40.88″N 78°16′47.23″W	1897	Romanesque Revival	Grace United Methodist Church
Contributing		7889 Main Street; 39°1′40.43″N 78°16′47.67″W	1890–1910	Vernacular	Historically known as the Dellinger-Shull House or the Woods-Berent House.
Contributing		7895 Main Street; 39°1′40.21″N 78°16′47.97″W	1920	American Craftsman	Historically known as the Dellinger-Ambrose House or the Hartley House.
Contributing		7896 Main Street; 39°1′39.07″N 78°16′46.42″W	1779	Greek Revival	Historically known as the Cirrani House. Built in 1779 with additions between 1820 and 1850.
Contributing		7907 Main Street; 39°1′39.32″N 78°16′49.18″W	1870–1900	Vernacular	
Contributing		7913 Main Street; 39°1′40″N 78°16′50.92″W	1910	Vernacular	Formerly known as the Gladys Lantzer Nursing Home.
Contributing		7924 Main Street; 39°1′38.37″N 78°16′50.33″W	1790–1810	Vernacular	Built between 1790 and 1810 with modifications in the mid and late-19th century.
Contributing		7927 Main Street; 39°1′39.35″N 78°16′51.78″W	1820–1830	Folk Victorian	Built between 1820 and 1830 with modifications between 1880 and 1910.
Contributing		7930 Main Street; 39°1′38.01″N 78°16′50.69″W	1810–1830	Vernacular	Historically known as the Huddle House.
Contributing		7939 Main Street; 39°1′37.37″N 78°16′51.62″W	1830–1850	Vernacular	Built between 1830 and 1850 with modifications between 1910 and 1930.
Contributing		7948 Main Street; 39°1′36.1″N 78°16′52.94″W	1890–1920	Vernacular	
Contributing		7952 Main Street; 39°1′36.09″N 78°16′53.02″W	1810–1830	Vernacular	Built between 1810 and 1830 with modifications between 1890–1910 and 1960–1980.
Contributing		7957 Main Street; 39°1′36.24″N 78°16′53.54″W	1810–1840	Vernacular	Historically known as the Evans-Hodson House. Built between 1810 and 1840 with modifications between 1880 and 1920.
Contributing		No address listed 39°1′35.9″N 78°16′54.26″W	1910–1930	Vernacular	Historically known as Stubley's Garage.
Contributing		7960 Main Street; 39°1′35.43″N 78°16′54.09″W	1900–1930	Colonial Revival	
Contributing		7969 Main Street; 39°1′35.72″N 78°16′54.94″W	1800	Vernacular	Historically known as the Munzing-Cave House. Built around 1800 with modifications between 1820 and 1840.
Contributing		7979 Main Street; 39°1′34.72″N 78°16′56.1″W	1800–1810	Vernacular	Historically known as the Jacob Willey House. Built between 1800 and 1810 with modifications between 1830–1850 and 1870–1900.
Contributing		7985 Main Street; 39°1′34.41″N 78°16′56.7″W	Mid-19th century	Vernacular	
Contributing		7994 Main Street; 39°1′32.92″N 78°16′57.03″W	1890–1920	Vernacular	
Contributing		8004 Main Street; 39°1′31.91″N 78°16′58.82″W	1800–1810	Vernacular	Historically known as the Jacob Willey House. Built between 1800 and 1810 with additions and modifications between 1830–1850 and 1870–1900.
Contributing		8026 Main Street; 39°1′29.93″N 78°16′59.27″W	1870–1900	Folk Victorian	Historically known as the Will Willey House or the Coverstone-Robertson House.
Contributing		8034 Main Street; 39°1′29.25″N 78°17′00.16″W	1880–1910	Folk Victorian	Historically known as the James L. Willey House.
Contributing		8043 Main Street; 39°1′30.23″N 78°17′2.28″W	1830–1850	Vernacular	Historically known as the Isaac Rhodes House or the Dalby House.
Contributing		8046 Main Street; 39°1′29.58″N 78°17′1.89″W	1910–1930	Colonial Revival/American Craftsman	
Contributing		8049 Main Street; 39°1′28.89″N 78°17′6.38″W	1900–1920	American Foursquare	Historically known as the Campbell House.

== Notes ==
1. 7625, 7632, 7640, 7648, 7656, 7664, 7695, 7708, 7745 and 7881 Main Street; 8019 Church Street; 2408 and 2493 First Street
