= Long Meadow (Middletown, Virginia) =

Historic house in Virginia, United States

- U.S. National Register of Historic Places
- Virginia Landmarks Register
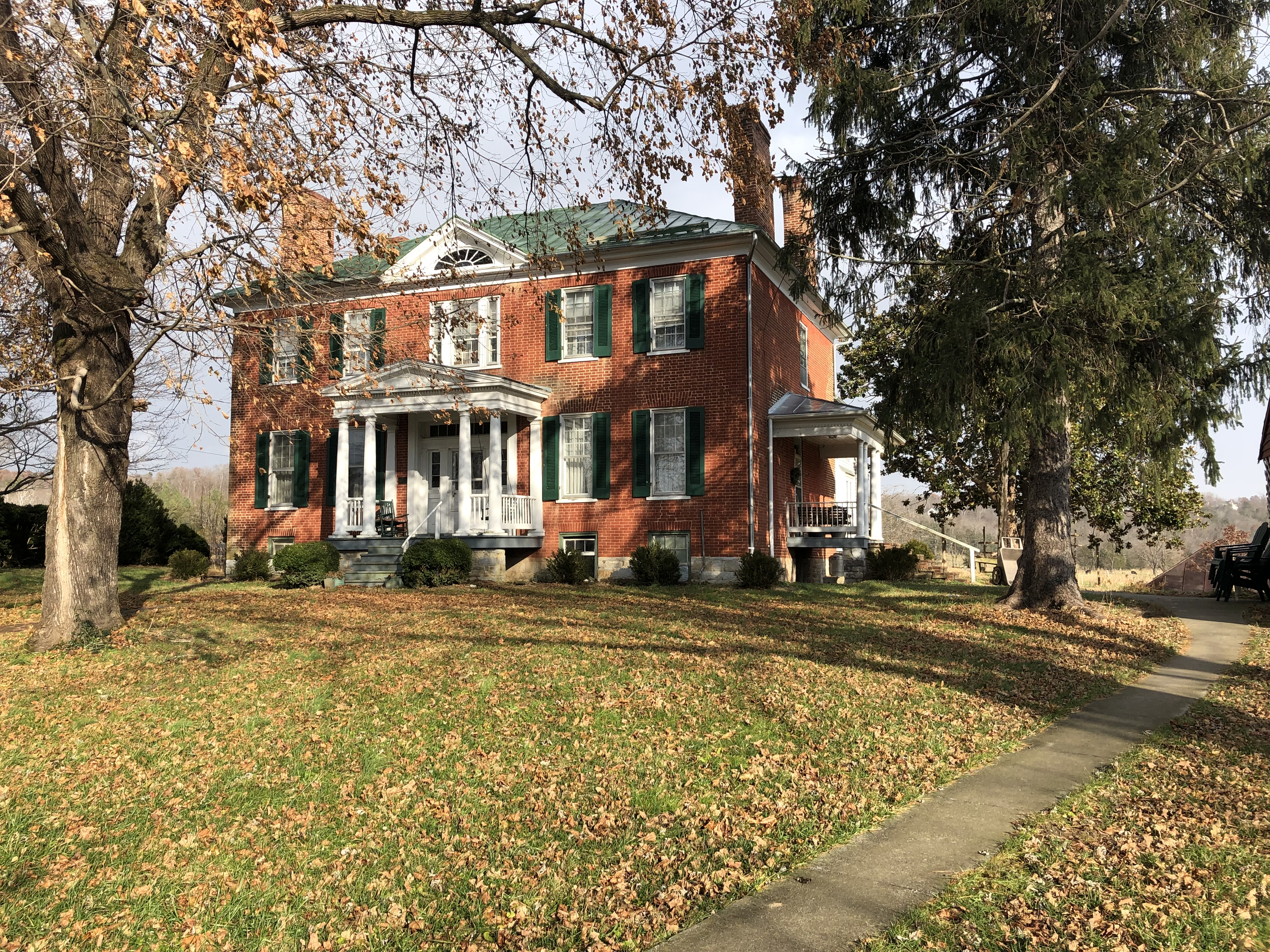

- Location within Northern Virginia Location within Virginia Location within the United States
- Location: Co. Rd. 611 about 0.9 mi. S of jct. with Co. Rd. 612, Middletown, Virginia
- Coordinates: 38°59′01″N 78°18′08″W
- Built: 1848
- Architectural style: Greek Revival, Federal
- NRHP reference No.: 95001169
- VLR No.: 093-0006

Significant dates
- Added to NRHP: September 15, 1995
- Designated VLR: August 28, 1995

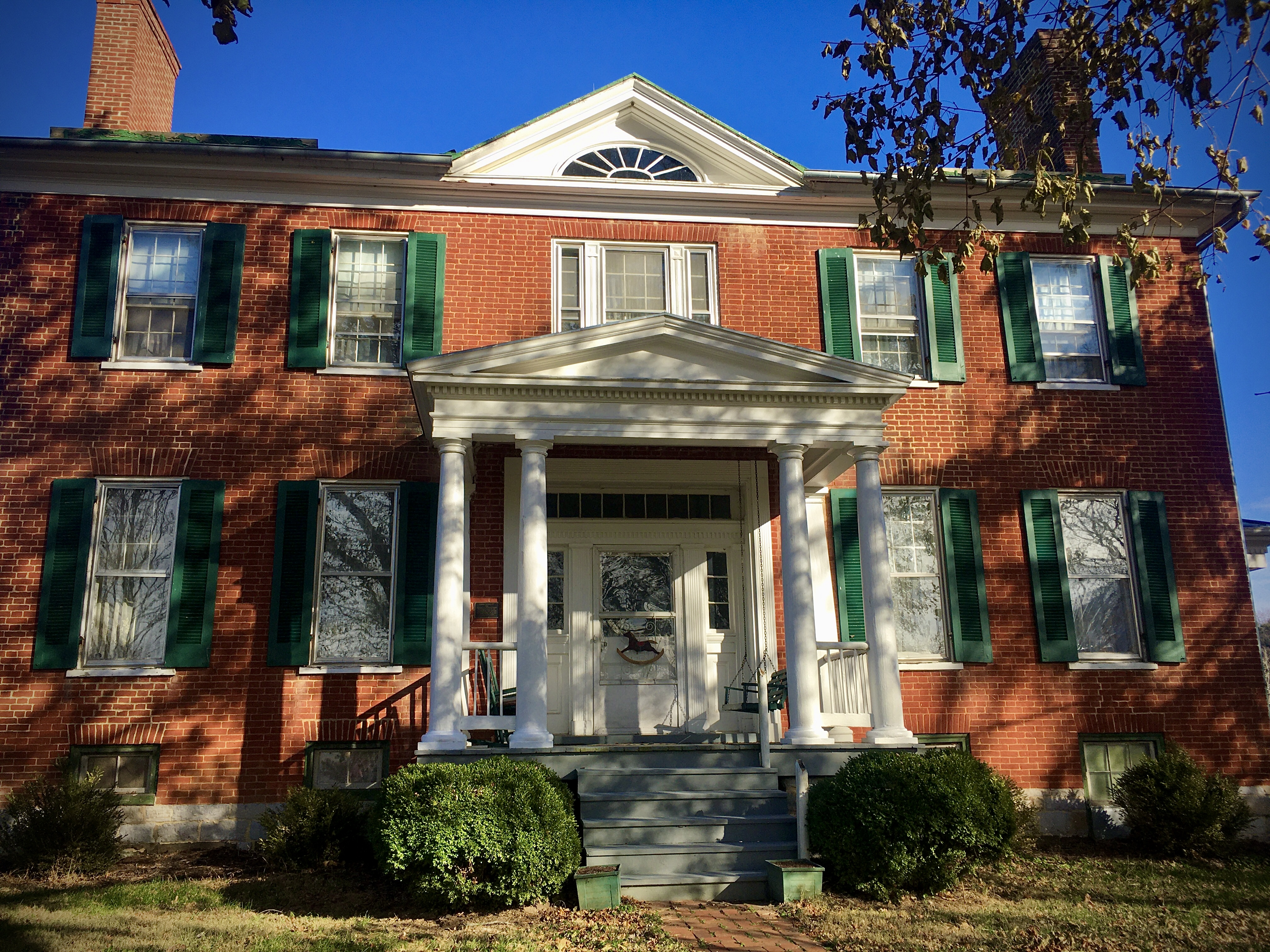

Long Meadow is a historic home located at Middletown, Warren County, Virginia. The home is located on the North Fork of the Shenandoah River and is in the shadow of Massanutten Mountain, in clear view of Signal Knob. The original homestead was one of the first settlements in the Valley and has only been owned by the Hite and Brumback family lines since the original house was built in the 1730s.

== History ==
Long Meadow was originally settled by the Hite Family who moved into the Shenandoah Valley in 1731. The land known as the Long Meadow Tract was settled by Isaac Hite, Sr.. He built the original house in the early 1730s and called it Traveler's Hall due to the constant presence of guests in the house. When Isaac Sr. died in 1795, the land was inherited by Isaac Hite, Jr. who subsequently divided the tract into five lots and built his own house, Belle Grove, on one of the lots. The five lots were given to Isaac Jr.'s five daughters through inheritance and marriage settlements, lot five was given to his daughter Matilda Hite Davison upon his death in 1836. Four years later, in 1880, she and her husband, Alexander M. Davison, sold the Long Meadow tract to the Bowman brothers, Isaac and Col. George, who was married to Matilda’s aunt, Mary Hite Bowman, the eldest daughter or Jost Hite.

In 1848, the original house, Traveler's Hall, was replaced by the current house. There is no historical record of why the original house was replaced, family lore suggests it either burned down or was torn down by the Bowman brothers. The current house was built on top of the foundation of Traveler's Hall. During the Civil War, the house was used as a landmark by Jubal Early's Confederate Army to mark their way to Belle Grove for the Battle of Cedar Creek as the house is clearly visible from Signal Knob on the top of Massanutten Mountain where Confederate Scouts had located a weakness in the Union Army's flank where Philip Sheridan was headquartered at Belle Grove.

After the Civil War, the Bowman family sold Long Meadow to Andrew Jackson "A.J.' Brumback, a Valley native. Brumback purchased the property in 1888 and later purchased Belle Grove in 1907. Long Meadow has been owned and operated by Brumback's descendants ever since, his great-great-granddaughter and her husband currently operate the property as a Black Angus cattle farm.

Long Meadow was listed on the National Register of Historic Places in 1995. The registration includes the main house, it's outbuildings, the graveyard, and the property immediately surrounding the buildings.

== Grounds ==
The current house was built in 1848 on top of the original foundation by the Bowman brothers after Traveler's Hall either burned down or was torn down. The house is a two-story, five-bay, brick dwelling in a transitional Federal / Greek Revival style. It has a hipped roof and a double-pile, central-passage floor plan. A frame kitchen wing was added in 1891 and interior transoms were added on the first floor in 1920 by Brumback's daughter-in-law.

The property is also the home of the Hite Family cemetery where Isaac Hite Sr. and Jr. are interred along with their wives, children, and other family members. The graveyard is currently maintained by Belle Grove for the Hite Family.

Also on the property are several outbuildings. The spring house with contributing icehouse, along with the overseer's house, and smoke house(no longer standing) were built by the Hite Family in the early 18th century. After Brumback purchased the property in 1888, he had several other outbuildings erected around the property including a workshop, hen house (which now operates as a machine shed), granary, and a bank barn in 1891. The bank barn is one of the largest barns in Warren County at approximately 50 by 80 feet (15 by 24 m) and is three stories tall.

At some point, a smithy was also built on the property, but the date is unknown. The family speculates it was either built by the Hite or Bowman Families in the early 19th century.

A pole barn and small shed also stand on the property and were built in the 1990s by the current owner's father.

== National registration ==
Long Meadow was listed on the National Register of Historic Places on September 15, 1995. The outbuildings and property were originally nominated by Mary Washington College. Long Meadow is listed for local significance.
