= St. Thomas Chapel =

Historic church in Virginia, United States

- U.S. National Register of Historic Places
- U.S. Historic district – Contributing property
- Virginia Landmarks Register
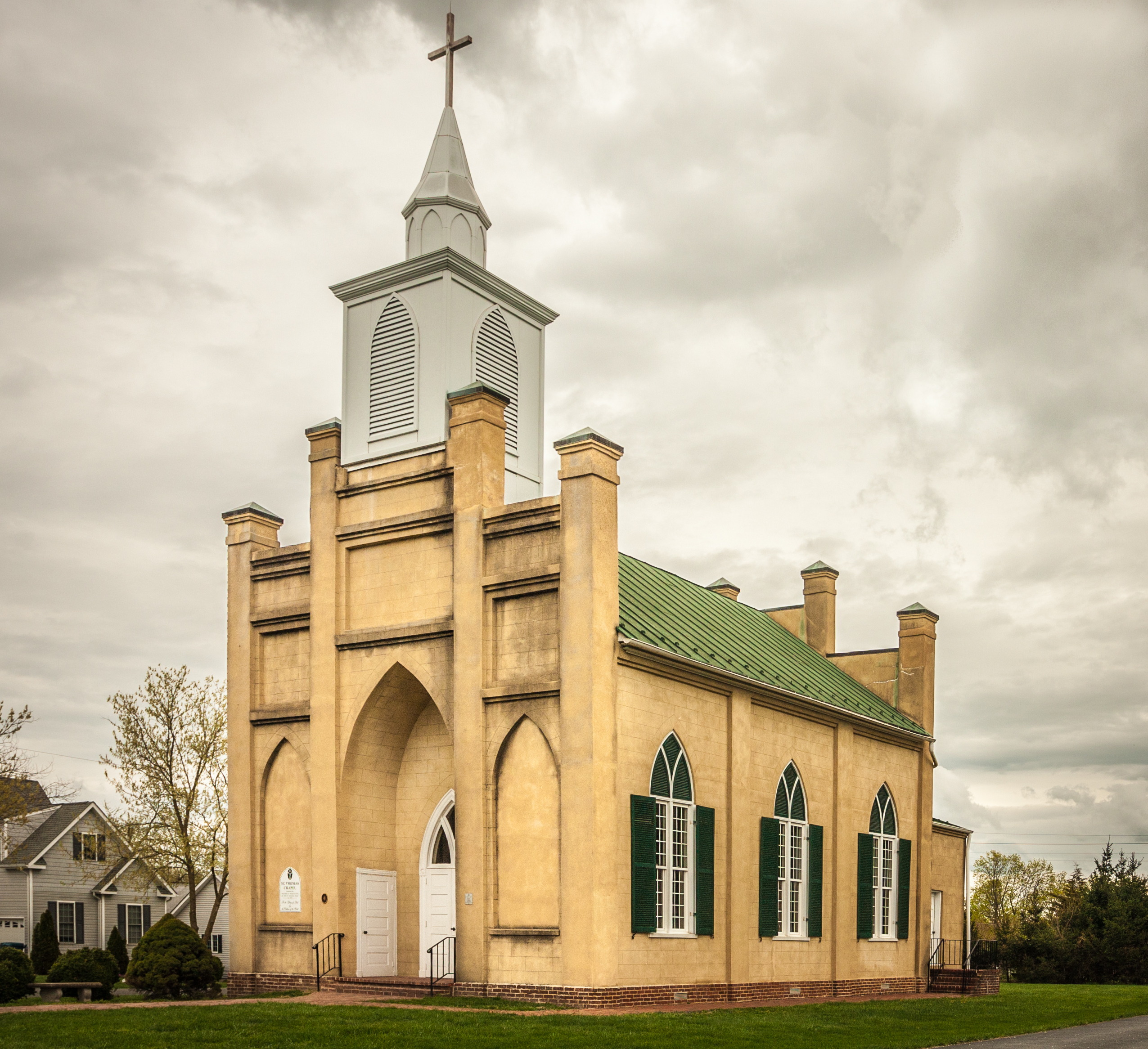
- St. Thomas Chapel, April 2013

- Location within Virginia Location within the United States
- Location: 7854 Church Street, Middletown, Virginia, US
- Coordinates: 39°1′39″N 78°16′40″W
- Area: 0.25 acres (0.10 ha)
- Built: 1837
- Architectural style: Gothic Revival
- Part of: Middletown Historic District
- NRHP reference No.: 73002015
- VLR No.: 260-0001

Significant dates
- Added to NRHP: April 11, 1973
- Designated VLR: January 16, 1973

St. Thomas Chapel, also known as St. Thomas Episcopal Church or St. Thomas Protestant Episcopal Chapel, is a historic building located at 7854 Church Street in Middletown, Frederick County, Virginia, United States. Built in the 1830s, regular services were held at the Episcopal church for almost 100 years. The building has been restored twice, once after being heavily damaged during the Civil War, and again in the 1960s. The church was added to the Virginia Landmarks Register (VLR) and the National Register of Historic Places (NRHP) in 1973.

== History ==
The congregation of St. Thomas Episcopal Church was established in 1834, becoming the seventh Episcopal church founded in Frederick County. The congregation, which included the Hite family of the nearby Belle Grove Plantation, raised the necessary funds and began construction of a church building on a 0.25 acres (0.10 ha) lot purchased for fifty dollars. The church was completed sometime around April 1837.

The church served as a military hospital for wounded Confederate soldiers during the Civil War. (The congregation worshiped temporarily at the nearby Grace Methodist Church.) In 1864, Union general Philip Sheridan's troops arrived in the area. The Union soldiers removed the wounded Confederate troops from the church hospital and converted the building into a stable. The Union troops later broke out the windows, burned the pews, and burned window shutters. Only the four walls of the building were left standing once they were done. After the war, the Federal government paid for some of the repairs to the church. This, along with contributions from church members, resulted in the church being reopened in 1867.

Throughout the next several decades a small congregation worshiped at St. Thomas Episcopal Church with approximately thirty people in attendance. Services regularly took place at the church until 1930 and on an occasional basis until 1945. The church building had deteriorated by that point and was abandoned the following year. The Episcopal Diocese of Virginia retained the property for several years before transferring ownership to Christ Episcopal Church in Winchester. In 1966, the church was given to Middletown's government to be used "as a chapel, museum or for any good moral purpose." The name of the building was changed to St. Thomas Church in 1967 to reflect it becoming an interfaith facility. A group of citizens founded the St. Thomas Chapel Trust and restored the building in the 1960s. Work included the installation of central heating and electricity, the restoration of the original organ and pews, laying a new floor, replacing the windows, and restoring the steeple and bell tower. St. Thomas was added to the VLR on January 16, 1973, and the NRHP on April 11, 1973. The building is also designated a contributing property to the Middletown Historic District, listed on the NRHP in 2003.

== Architecture ==
The building is a one-story, stepped gable-roofed, three bay by three bay church in the Gothic Revival style. It measures 30 feet (9.1 m) by 50 feet (15 m) and the recessed chancel measures 20 feet (6.1 m) by 10 feet (3.0 m). The exterior is made of the original stucco, coursed ashlar, and brick, while the foundation is made of brick and stone. The standing seam metal roof is flanked on either end by parapet walls. The cupola is made of wood and features Gothic style vents, an octagonal belfry with Gothic arches, pyramidal roof, and a wooden cross.

== See also ==
- National Register of Historic Places listings in Frederick County, Virginia

== Notes ==
1. In 1836, Frederick County was divided into three separate counties: Frederick, Warren, and Clarke.
2. The windows were replaced again in 2001. The older ones were placed in storage.
