= Route 11 Potato Chips =

American potato chip company

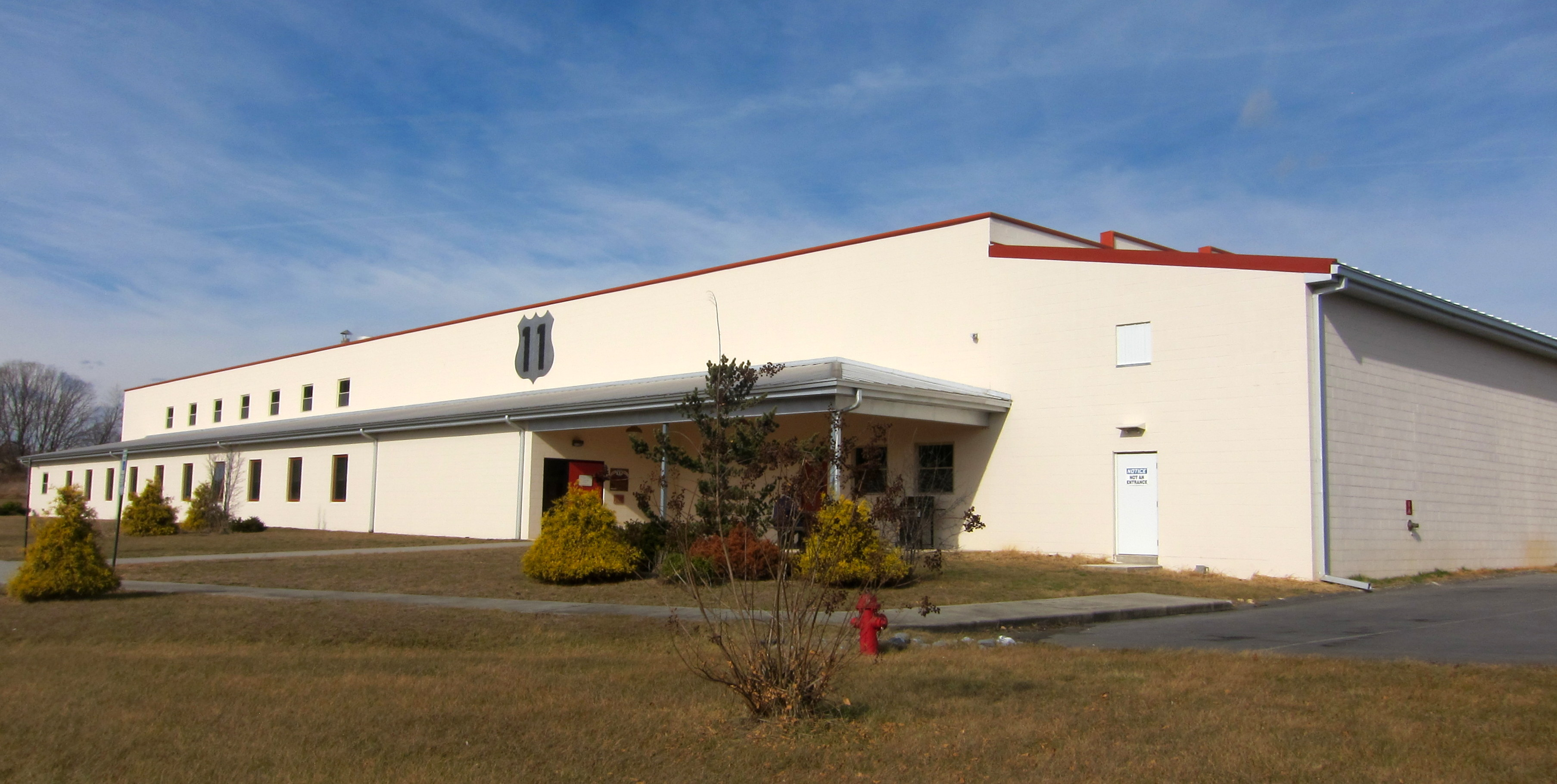
- The Route 11 Potato Chips factory in Mount Jackson, Virginia
- Company type: Private company
- Industry: Food processing
- Founded: 1992; 33 years ago
- Founder: Sarah Cohen
- Headquarters: Mount Jackson, Virginia, United States
- Area served: United States
- Products: Kettle-cooked potato chips
- Website: rt11.com

Route 11 Potato Chips is an American brand and manufacturer of kettle-cooked potato chips based in Mount Jackson, Virginia, United States, located in the Shenandoah Valley. The company competes with other Mid-Atlantic potato chip companies such as Martin's Potato Chips and Utz Brands.

== History ==
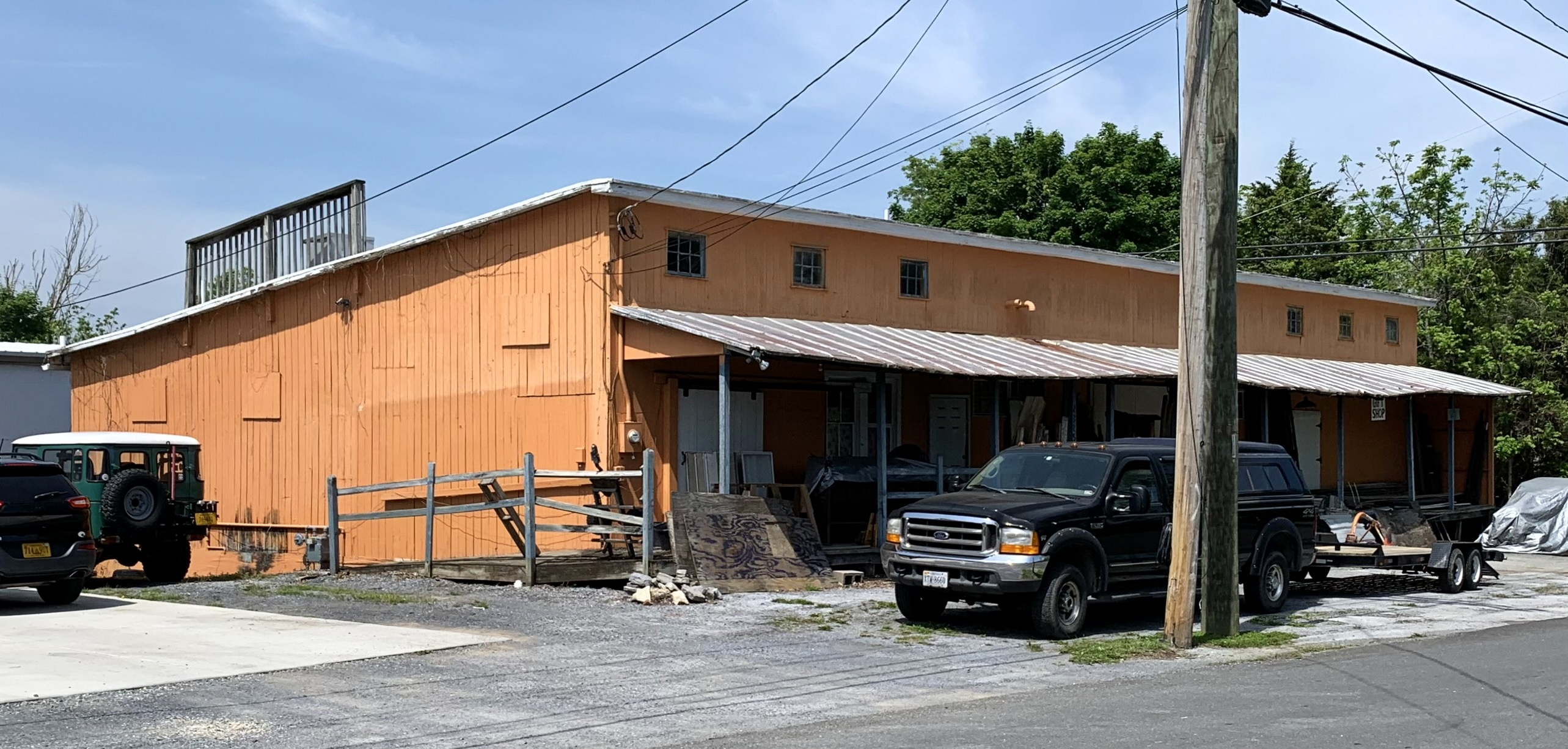
The original warehouse in Middletown, Virginia, which housed Route 11 Potato Chips. The company's second warehouse was around the corner.

Route 11 Potato Chips was founded in 1992 by Sarah Cohen and originally based in Middletown, Virginia, named after U.S. Route 11, which runs north-south nearby. The company moved its production facility to Mount Jackson in 2008 where the chips are produced currently.

In 2013, Route 11 partnered with Ben & Jerry's to produce a promotional ice cream flavor Capitol Chill, garnished with the company's Sweet Potato chips.

In June 2022, Route 11 began work on constructing four sunflower oil reserve tanks, as the Russian invasion of Ukraine had affected the production of the needed ingredient in Russia and Ukraine, the largest and second-largest producers of the oil respectively. The company received $25,000 from Virginia's Agriculture and Forest Industry Development fund, with the total cost of the project predicted to be about $50,000. Construction of the tanks was completed in August. To further secure supply of sunflower oil, Route 11 has also considered purchasing oil from a farm near Richmond, Virginia as well as one located in North Carolina.

== Factory and production ==
The Route 11 Potato Chips manufacturing facility is located on 11 Edwards Way next to Interstate 81 and U.S 11 near Shenandoah Caverns. The factory building has a lobby open to the public where visitors can purchase chips and merchandise, get free samples, and view the factory itself.

The company typically uses potatoes locally-grown in Virginia or ones grown in North Carolina. Seasonally, Yukon Gold and sweet potatoes are used for other chip flavors. The factory produces 600 pounds of potato chips each hour.

== Flavors ==
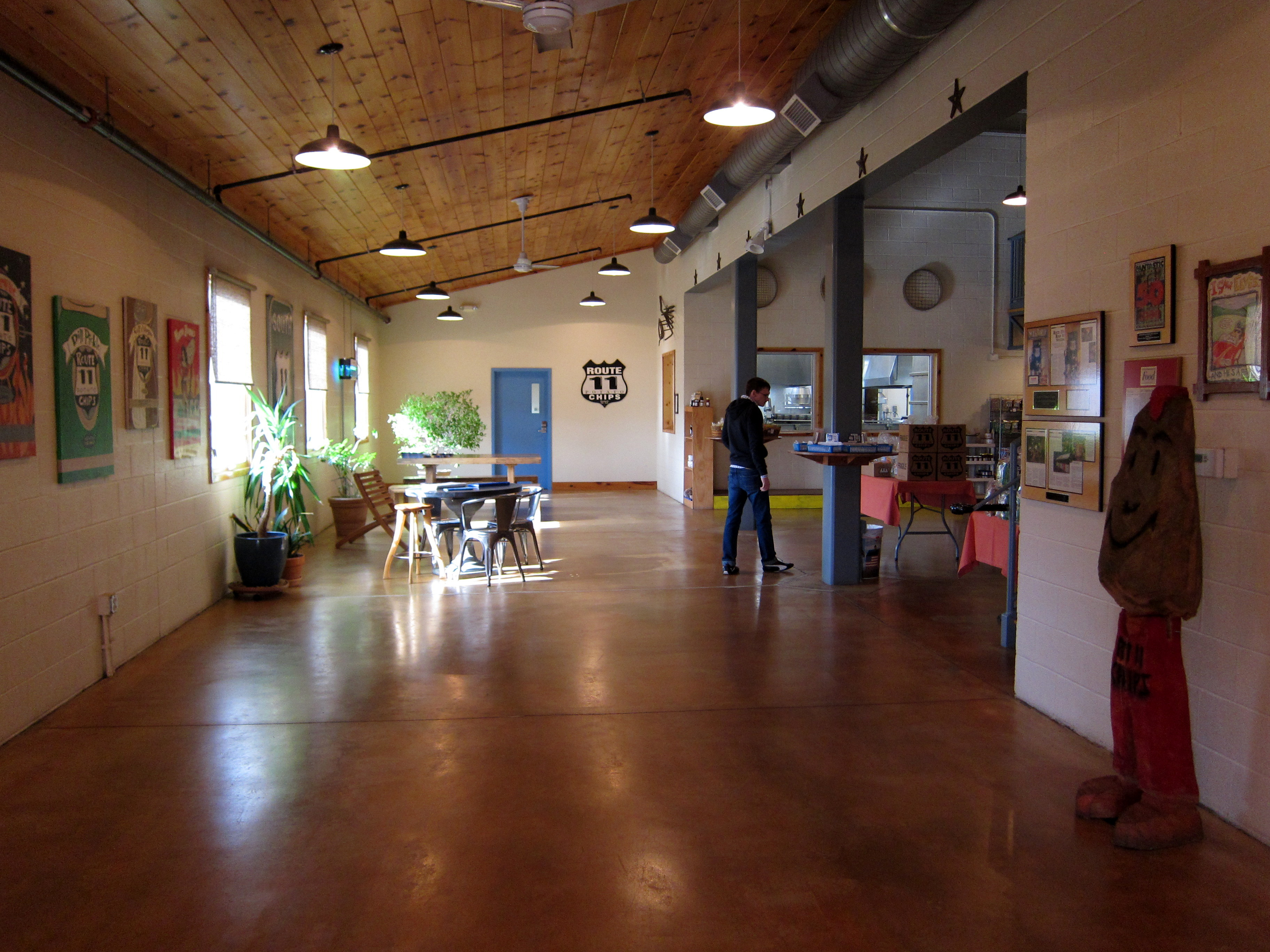
Visitors are allowed to watch the chip production, try samples, and purchase chips at the Mount Jackson factory.

Route 11 sells eleven different chip flavors:

- Lightly Salted, the company's standard flavor
- Barbeque, seasoned with barbecue spices
- Chesapeake Crab, seasoned with spice traditionally used to season crabs in the Mid-Atlantic region
- Dill Pickle, vinegar added for a dill pickle flavor
- Salt & Pepper, seasoned with both Appalachian salt and cracked pepper
- Salt & Vinegar, flavored with both salt and vinegar
- Sour Cream & Chive, flavored similarly to French onion dip
- Sweet Potato, produced seasonally; made from sweet potatoes
- Yukon Gold, produced seasonally; made from Yukon Gold potatoes
- No Salt, unsalted kettle chips; not sold individually-packaged
- Mama Zuma's Revenge, a brand of habanero-flavored chips
