= Old Forge Farm (Middletown, Virginia) =

Historic house in Virginia, United States

- U.S. National Register of Historic Places
- Virginia Landmarks Register
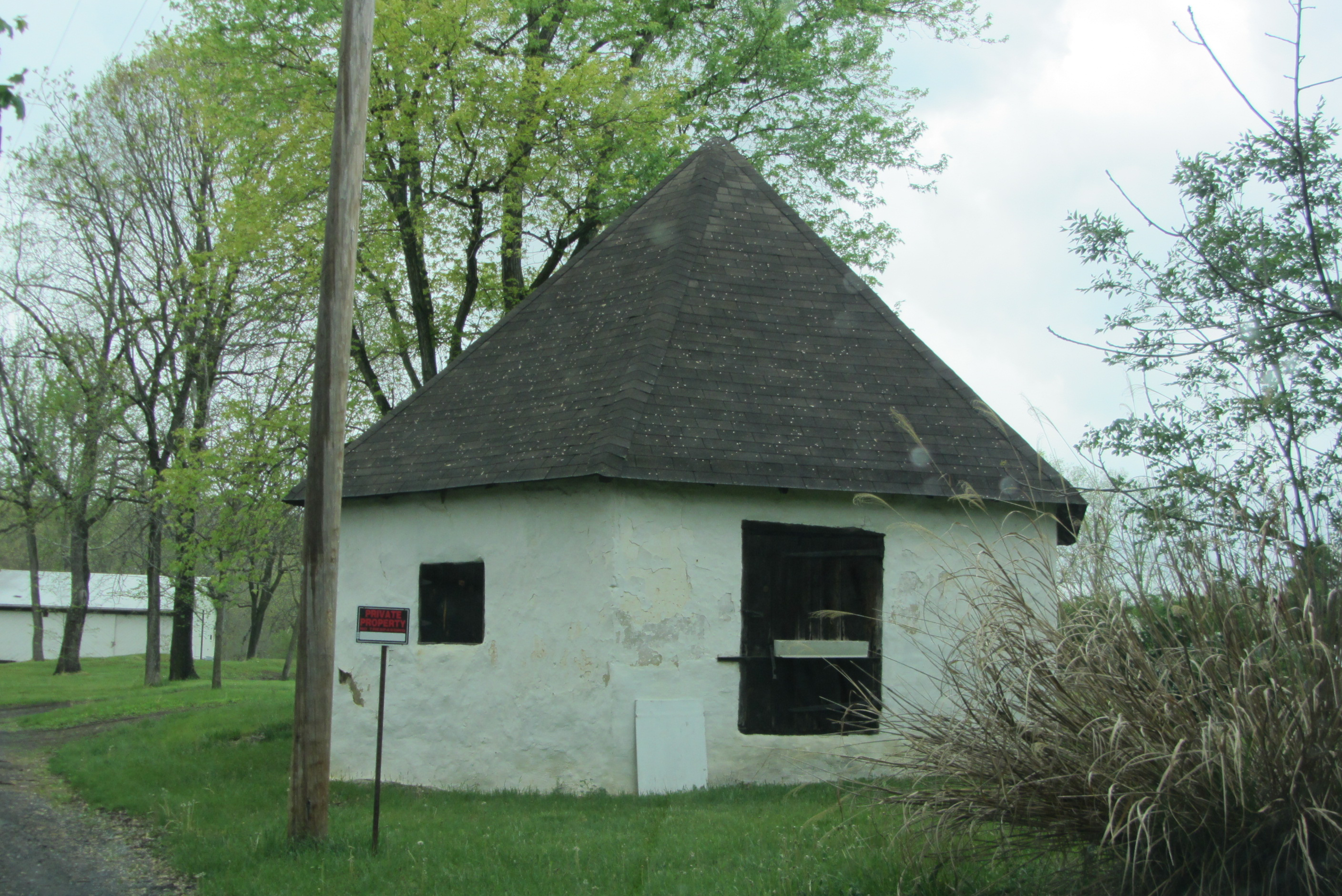
- Old Forge Farm ice house, April 2012

- Location within Virginia Location within the United States
- Location: 7326 Middle Rd., near Middletown, Virginia
- Coordinates: 39°04′41″N 78°19′33″W
- Area: 29 acres (12 ha)
- Built: 1750
- Architectural style: Early Republic
- NRHP reference No.: 04000036
- VLR No.: 034-0125

Significant dates
- Added to NRHP: February 11, 2004
- Designated VLR: October 3, 2003

Old Forge Farm, also known as Zane's Furnace, Stephens Fort, and Marlboro Iron Works, is a historic home and farm located near Middletown, Frederick County, Virginia. The original section dates to the 18th century. The house is a two-story, asymmetrical, three-bay, limestone dwelling with a two-story addition connecting the main house to a one-story former summer kitchen. Also on the property are the contributing 18th century hexagonal ice house of unusual design, an early 20th-century root cellar, privy, and shed. The property was first known as Stephen's Fort, built by Lewis Stephens, son of Peter Stephens, for protection during the French and Indian War. Sold in 1767 to Isaac Zane, whose Zane's Furnace (Marlboro Iron Works) was a major manufacturer of munitions for the Continental Army. Grist mill operations continued into the 1950s.

It was listed on the National Register of Historic Places in 2004.
