= Middletown, Virginia =

- Town
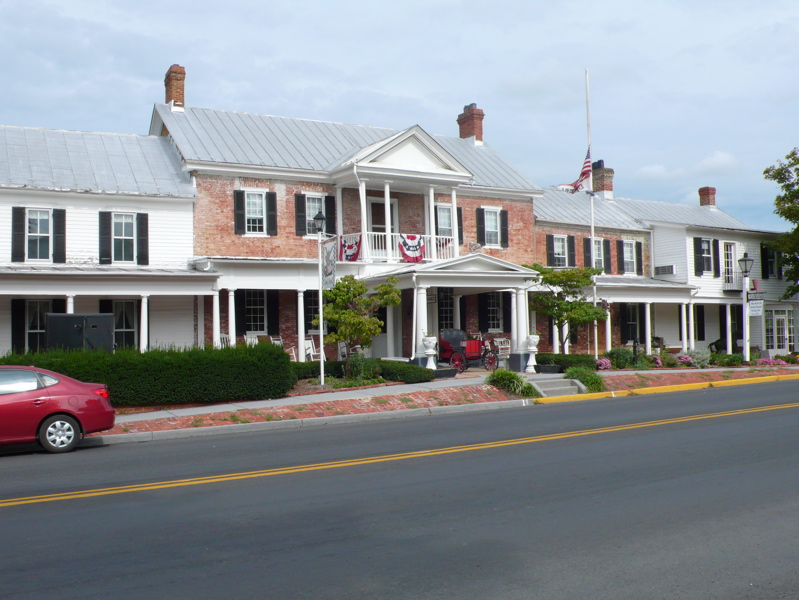
- The Wayside Inn (1797) in Middletown

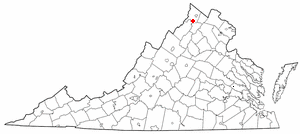
- Location of Middletown, Virginia
- Coordinates: 39°1′41″N 78°16′45″W
- Country: United States
- State: Virginia
- County: Frederick

Government
  - Mayor: Charles Harbaugh IV
  - Vice Mayor: Jeffrey Pennington

Area
  - Total: 0.78 sq mi (2.01 km^{2})
  - Land: 0.78 sq mi (2.01 km^{2})
  - Water: 0 sq mi (0.00 km^{2})
- Elevation: 715 ft (218 m)

Population (2020)
  - Total: 1,355
  - Estimate (2019): 1,396
  - Density: 1,801.2/sq mi (695.44/km^{2})
- Time zone: UTC−5 (Eastern (EST))
  - Summer (DST): UTC−4 (EDT)
- ZIP code: 22645
- Area code: 540
- FIPS code: 51-51512
- GNIS feature ID: 1495940
- Website: www.middletownva.gov

Middletown is a town in Frederick County, Virginia, United States, in the northern Shenandoah Valley. As of the 2020 census, Middletown had a population of 1,355.

== History ==
Middletown was chartered on May 4, 1796. Some of the first documentation of early Middletown dates back to the late 18th century and is attributed to Dr. Peter Senseney and his wife Magdelen, two German settlers who had migrated from Pennsylvania. The town was originally known as "Senseney Town", a piece of land within the 17th century Fairfax Grant and gifted to the allies for siding with England during the civil war in the 1600s.

Belle Grove Plantation, about a mile southwest of Middletown, was first settled in about 1750, and its historic Federal-style manor house was completed in 1797. Middletown was the site of numerous military operations in the American Civil War including the Battle of Cedar Creek, fought just south of the town. The area where this battle occurred has been protected as part of the Cedar Creek and Belle Grove National Historical Park. Because the town was founded long before the Civil War, its antebellum history is extensive, as evidenced by the fact that Middletown's Wayside Inn purports to be the longest continuously running inn in America. Wayside Theatre, also located in Middletown, was one of Virginia's oldest professional live theaters (opened 1963, closed 2013). The town is home to Laurel Ridge Community College.

In addition to Belle Grove Plantation, Long Meadow, the Middletown Historic District, Fort Bowman, Monte Vista, Old Forge Farm, and St. Thomas Chapel are listed on the National Register of Historic Places. In 2012 the town of Middletown elected the youngest mayor in Virginia history at the age of 24, Charles Hamilton Harbaugh IV. He was reelected in 2016.

== Geography ==
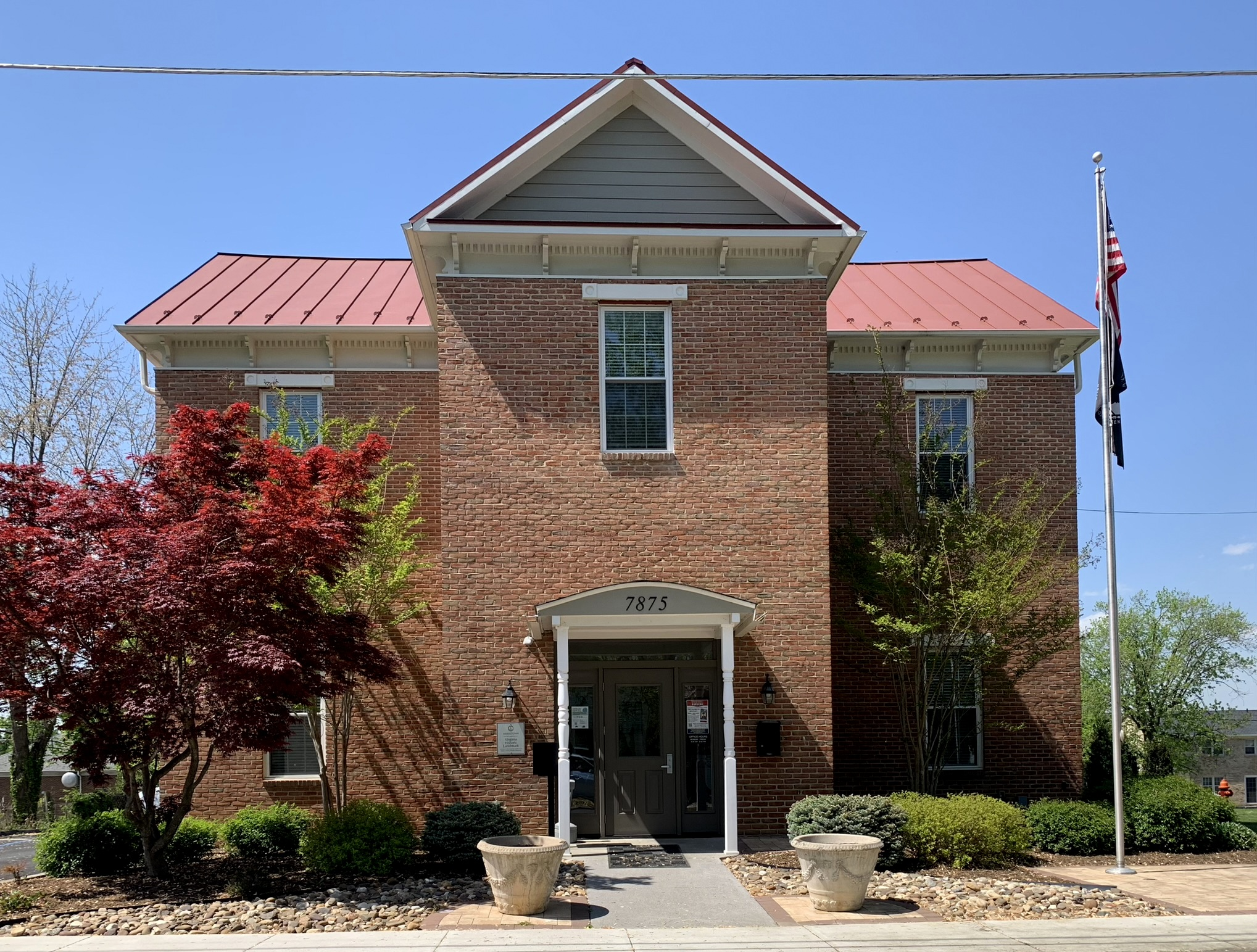
Middletown Town Hall

Middletown is located in southern Frederick County at 39°1′41″N 78°16′45″W (39.027989, −78.279273). It is in the Shenandoah Valley region and is 5 miles (8 km) southwest of Stephens City, 13 miles (21 km) southwest of Winchester, 5 miles (8 km) northeast of Strasburg, and 80 miles (129 km) west of Washington D.C.

According to the United States Census Bureau, the town has a total area of 0.77 square miles (2.0 km^{2}), of which 0.01 square miles (0.02 km^{2}), or 0.90%, are water. The town lies on a ridge between Meadow Brook to the northwest and tributaries of Molly Booth Run to the southeast. It is part of the watershed of the North Fork of the Shenandoah River.

=== Climate ===
Middletown has a Humid Subtropical climate, with hot, humid summers, and cool winters with moderate snowfall. January lows average 22.9 °F, while July highs average 86.9. Snowfall averages 23.2 inches per year and precipitation averages 40.2 inches per year.

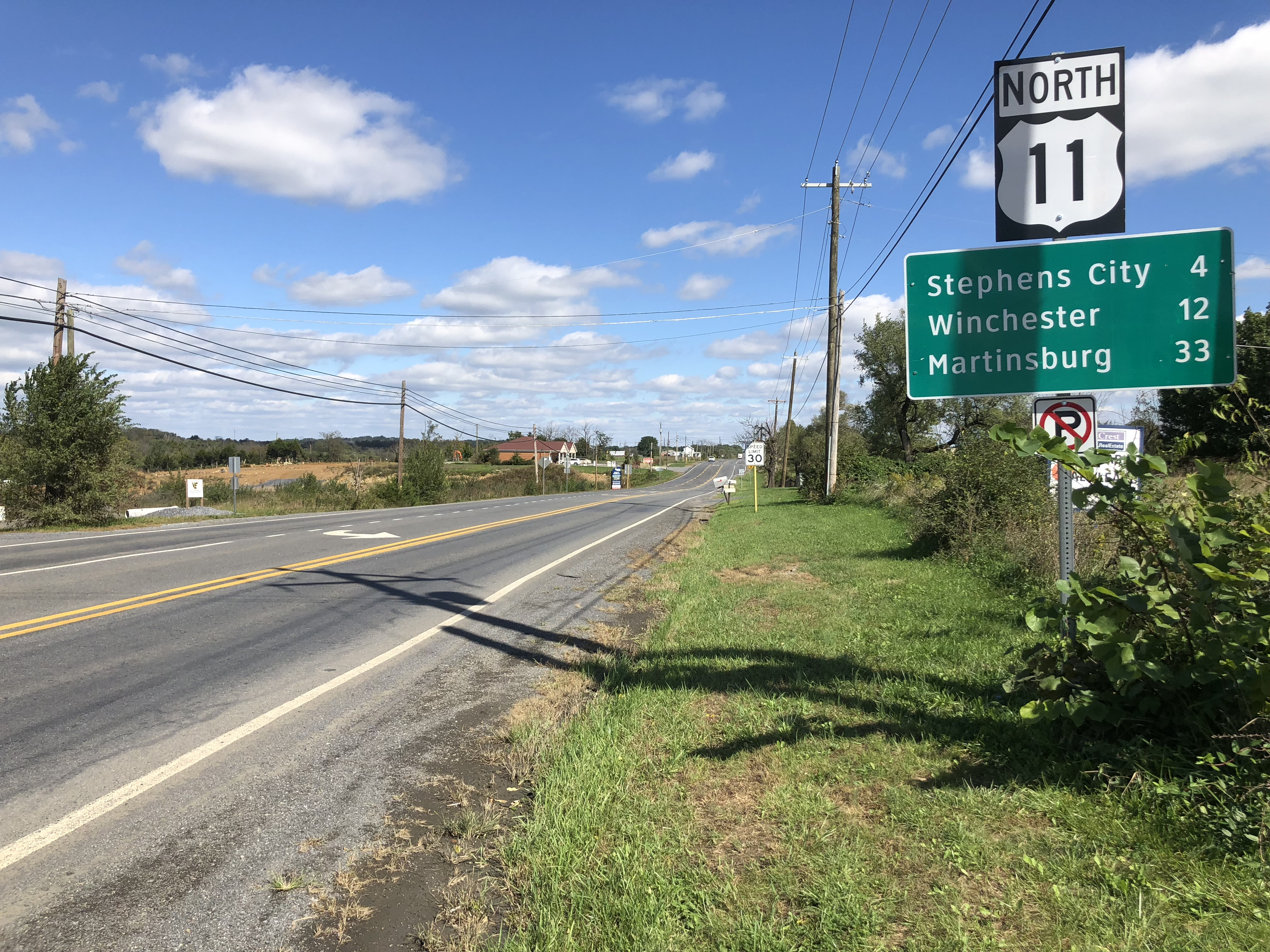
View north along US 11 in Middletown

== Transportation ==
U.S. Route 11 (Main Street) runs through the center of Middletown and extends northeast–southwest, serving primarily as a local service road for nearby Interstate 81. Exit 302 along I-81 connects with Reliance Road just east of the town limits, providing direct access to Middletown. I-81 extends north to eastern West Virginia, western Maryland, Pennsylvania and New York, and southwest to Tennessee. It interchanges with Interstate 66 just to the south of Middletown, which extends eastward to Washington, D.C.

== Demographics ==
Historical population
Census	Pop.	Note	%±
1880	372		—
1890	410		10.2%
1900	423		3.2%
1910	363		−14.2%
1920	354		−2.5%
1930	416		17.5%
1940	361		−13.2%
1950	386		6.9%
1960	378		−2.1%
1970	507		34.1%
1980	841		65.9%
1990	1,061		26.2%
2000	1,015		−4.3%
2010	1,265		24.6%
2020	1,355		7.1%
U.S. Decennial Census

As of the census of 2000, there were 1,015 people, 409 households and 280 families residing in the town. The population density was 1,851.9 per square mile (712.5/km^{2}). There were 432 housing units at an average density of 788.2 per square mile (303.3/km^{2}). The racial makeup of the town was 93.69% White, 4.43% African American, 0.20% Native American, 0.39% Asian, 0.30% Pacific Islander, and 0.99% from two or more races. Hispanic or Latino of any race were 0.79% of the population.

There were 409 households, out of which 35.5% had children under the age of 18 living with them, 49.1% were married couples living together, 14.2% had a female householder with no husband present, and 31.3% were non-families. 27.6% of all households were made up of individuals, and 10.0% had someone living alone who was 65 years of age or older. The average household size was 2.48 and the average family size was 2.96.

In the town, the population was spread out, with 26.7% under the age of 18, 8.4% from 18 to 24, 32.9% from 25 to 44, 20.5% from 45 to 64, and 11.5% who were 65 years of age or older. The median age was 36 years. For every 100 females, there were 89.4 males. For every 100 females age 18 and over, there were 86.0 males.

The median income for a household in the town was $36,538 and the median income for a family was $42,031. Males had a median income of $30,893 and females $23,125. The per capita income was $18,613. About 6.8% of families and 7.6% of the population were below the poverty line, including 4.9% of those under age 18 and 11.9% of those age 65 or over.
