= Monte Vista (Middletown, Virginia) =

Historic house in Virginia, United States

- U.S. National Register of Historic Places
- Virginia Landmarks Register
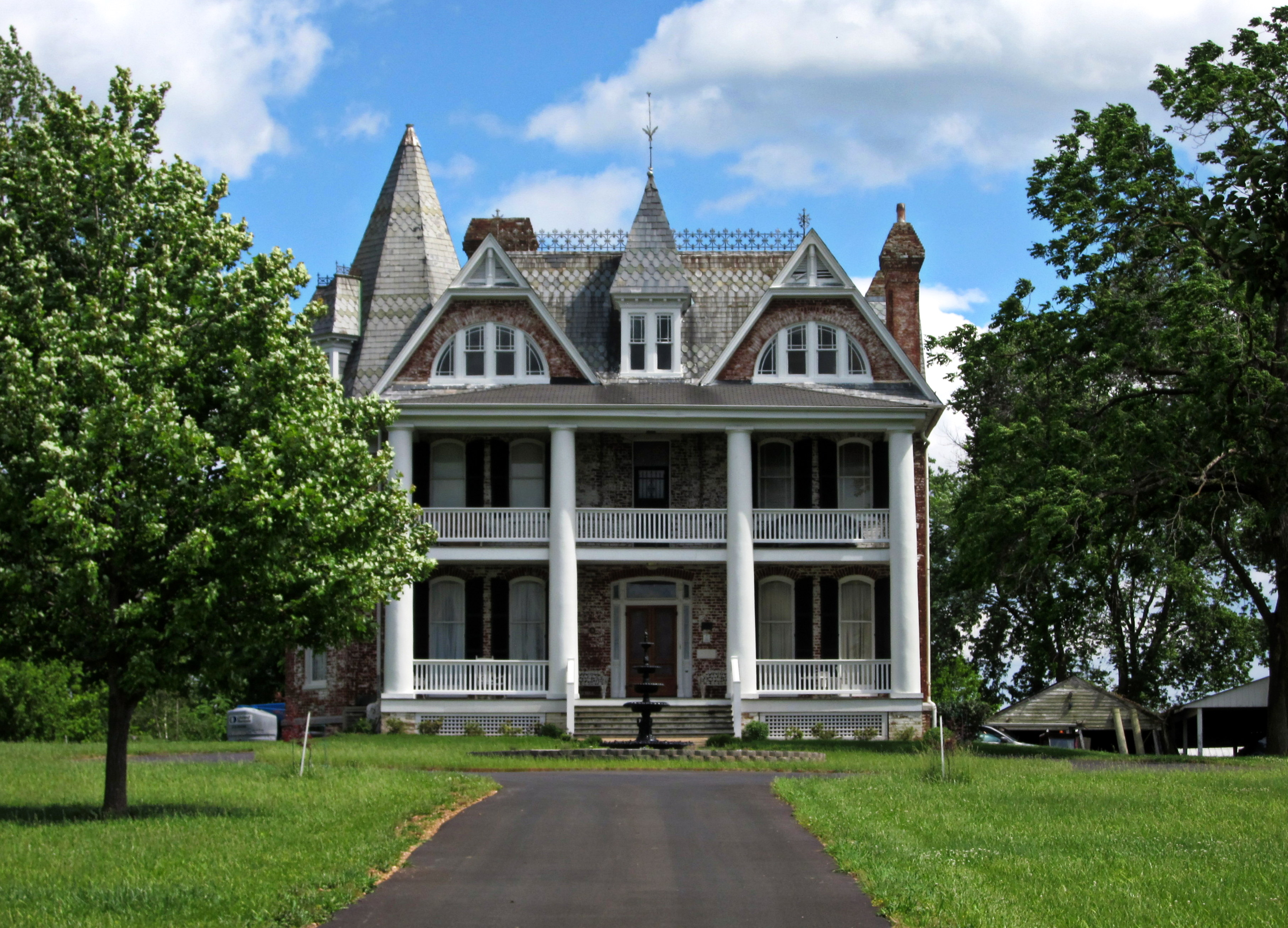
- Monte Vista, June 2013

- Location within Virginia Location within the United States
- Location: 8100 US 11, near Middletown, Virginia
- Coordinates: 39°1′12″N 78°17′22″W
- Area: 5 acres (2.0 ha)
- Built: 1883
- Architectural style: Stick/eastlake, Queen Anne
- NRHP reference No.: 87002018
- VLR No.: 034-0014

Significant dates
- Added to NRHP: November 16, 1987
- Designated VLR: April 21, 1987

Monte Vista, also known as Cedar Grove Farm and Heater House, is a historic home located near Middletown, Frederick County, Virginia. It was built in 1883, and is a large three-story, five-bay, brick dwelling with Eastlake and Queen Anne design elements. The front facade features a two-story portico with four full-height Tuscan columns, added about 1942. Also on the property are the contributing large bank barn with cupola and weathervane, a scale house dating at least to 1907, a frame summer kitchen, a two level stone ice house, a smokehouse, and a brick bake oven. It was owned by Solomon and Caroline Wunder Heater, who lost two sons fighting for the Confederacy, even though she was a staunch Union sympathizer.

It was listed on the National Register of Historic Places in 1987.
